= 2007 Dallas Desperados season =

Arena Football League team season

- Head coach: Will McClay
- Home stadium: American Airlines Center

Results
- Record: 15–1
- Division place: 1st
- Playoffs: L 66–59 vs Columbus

The 2007 Dallas Desperados season was the 6th season for the franchise. They made the playoffs again after finishing 2006 with a 13–3 record. They had a 15–1 record and qualified for home-field advantage throughout the National Conference playoffs.

== Schedule ==
Week	Date	Opponent	Home/Away Game	Result
1	March 4	New York Dragons	Away	W 60–7
2	March 10	Tampa Bay Storm	Home	W 59–40
3	March 16	Kansas City Brigade	Away	W 66–54
4	March 26	Orlando Predators	Away	W 70–49
5	March 31	Austin Wranglers	Home	W 68–64
6	April 5	Columbus Destroyers	Home	W 53–51
7	April 16	Philadelphia Soul	Home	W 51–41
8	April 21	Georgia Force	Away	L 78–63
9	April 27	Nashville Kats	Home	W 69–62
10	May 4	Utah Blaze	Away	W 66–59
11	May 14	Chicago Rush	Home	W 52–48
12	bye			
13	May 26	Columbus Destroyers	Away	W 56–47
14	June 1	Philadelphia Soul	Away	W 59–56
15	June 9	New Orleans VooDoo	Home	W 80–79
16	June 16	New York Dragons	Home	W 67–13
17	June 25	Colorado Crush	Away	W 77–58

== Playoff schedule ==
Round	Date	Opponent	Home/Away	Result
2	July 7	(6) Columbus Destroyers	Home	L 66–59

== Coaching ==
Will McClay started his fourth season as head coach of the Desperados.

== Stats ==
=== Offense ===
==== Quarterback ====
Player	Comp.	Att.	Comp%	Yards	TD's	INT's	Long	Rating
Clint Dolezel	375	533	70.4	4475	107	9	49	128.2
Nick Browder	17	27	63	208	5	1	22	110.8

==== Running backs ====
Player	Car.	Yards	Avg.	TD's	Long
Josh White	93	278	3	10	22
Will Pettis	14	33	2.4	2	8
Clint Dolezel	10	5	.5	1	4
Marcus Nash	4	5	1.3	3	3
Andrae Thurman	1	4	4	0	4
Willis Marshall	4	2	.5	2	2
Nick Browder	1	0	0	0	0
Duke Pettijohn	3	0	0	1	1

==== Wide receivers ====
Player	Rec.	Yards	Avg.	TD's	Long
Will Pettis	130	1471	11.3	40	46
Marcus Nash	77	1080	14	20	45
Andrae Thurman	65	839	12.9	19	49
Willis Marshall	66	747	11.3	12	48
Dialleo Burks	18	243	13.5	9	30
Anthony Armstrong	10	126	12.6	2	34
Terrence Dotsy	16	102	6.4	6	15
Josh White	9	72	8	3	13
Devin Wyman	1	3	3	1	3

==== Touchdowns ====
Player	TD's	Rush	Rec	Ret	Pts
Will Pettis	46	2	40	4	278
Marcus Nash	23	3	20	0	142
Andrae Thurman	19	0	19	0	114
Willis Marshall	15	2	12	1	96
Josh White	13	10	3	0	78
Dialleo Burks	9	0	9	0	54
Terrance Dotsy	6	0	6	0	36
Anthony Armstrong	2	0	2	0	18
Clint Dolezel	1	1	0	0	6
Bobby Perry	1	0	0	1	6
Duke Pettijohn	1	1	0	0	6
Devin Wyman	1	0	1	0	6

=== Defense ===
Player	Tackles	Solo	Assisted	Sack	Solo	Assisted	INT	Yards	TD's	Long
Jermaine Jones	87.5	82	11	0	0	0	7	71	2	40
Bobby Perry	60.5	51	19	0	0	0	3	0	0	0
Will Pettis	59.5	56	7	0	0	0	3	1	0	1
Chris Brown	58	53	10	0	0	0	3	24	0	13
Duke Pettijohn	43.5	35	17	6	5	2	0	0	0	0
Bobby Keyes	39.5	38	3	0	0	0	6	67	1	30
Colston Weatherington	19.5	17	5	10	10	0	0	0	0	0
Rickie Simpkins	16.5	13	7	.5	0	1	0	0	0	0
Waine Bacon	13.5	13	1	0	0	0	0	0	0	0
Willis Marshall	13.5	10	7	0	0	0	1	4	0	4
Peter Lazare	13	9	8	0	0	0	0	0	0	0
Josh White	12.5	10	5	0	0	0	0	0	0	0
Andrae Thurman	9.5	8	3	0	0	0	0	0	0	0
Daleroy Stewart	9	6	6	1.5	1	1	0	0	0	0
Devin Wyman	4	4	0	0	0	0	0	0	0	0
Dialleo Burks	3.5	3	1	0	0	0	0	0	0	0
Anthony Armstrong	3	3	0	0	0	0	0	0	0	0
Todd Sievers	3	3	0	0	0	0	0	0	0	0
Terrence Dotsy	1.5	1	1	0	0	0	0	0	0	0
Jermaine Brooks	1	0	2	0	0	0	0	0	0	0
Jeremy Calahan	1	1	0	0	0	0	0	0	0	0
James Cannida	1	1	0	0	0	0	0	0	0	0
Clint Dolezel	1	1	0	0	0	0	0	0	0	0

=== Special teams ===
==== Kick return ====
Player	Ret	Yards	TD's	Long	Avg	Ret	Yards	TD's	Long	Avg
Will Pettis	58	1229	4	58	21.2	2	18	0	18	9
Willis Marshall	29	485	1	56	16.7	0	0	0	0	0
Bobby Perry	1	7	1	7	7	0	0	0	0	0
Andrae Thurman	1	6	0	6	6	0	0	0	0	0
Jermaine Jones	0	0	0	0	0	1	0	0	0	0

==== Kicking ====
Player	Extra pt.	Extra pt. Att.	FG	FGA	Long	Pct.	Pts
Todd Sievers	115	119	8	13	49	0.615	139
Dustin Bell	11	17	0	1	–	–	11

== Playoff Stats ==
=== Offense ===
==== Quarterback ====
Player	Comp.	Att.	Comp%	Yards	TD's	INT's

==== Running backs ====
Player	Car.	Yards	Avg.	TD's	Long

==== Wide receivers ====
Player	Rec.	Yards	Avg.	TD's	Long

=== Special teams ===
==== Kick return ====
Player	Ret	Yards	Avg	Long

==== Kicking ====
Player	Extra pt.	Extra pt. Att.	FG	FGA	Long	Pts

== Regular season ==
=== Week 1: at New York Dragons ===
Scoring Summary:

1st Quarter:

2nd Quarter:

3rd Quarter:

4th Quarter:

=== Week 2: vs Tampa Bay Storm ===
Scoring Summary:

1st Quarter:

2nd Quarter:

3rd Quarter:

4th Quarter:

=== Week 3: at Kansas City Brigade ===
Scoring Summary:

1st Quarter:

2nd Quarter:

3rd Quarter:

4th Quarter:

=== Week 4: at Orlando Predators ===
Scoring Summary:

1st Quarter:

2nd Quarter:

3rd Quarter:

4th Quarter:

=== Week 5: vs Austin Wranglers ===
Scoring Summary:

1st Quarter:

2nd Quarter:

3rd Quarter:

4th Quarter:

=== Week 6: vs Columbus Destroyers ===
Scoring Summary:

1st Quarter:

2nd Quarter:

3rd Quarter:

4th Quarter:

=== Week 7: vs Philadelphia Soul ===
Scoring Summary:

1st Quarter:

2nd Quarter:

3rd Quarter:

4th Quarter:

=== Week 8: at Georgia Force ===
Scoring Summary:

1st Quarter:

2nd Quarter:

3rd Quarter:

4th Quarter:

=== Week 9: vs Nashville Kats ===
Scoring Summary:

1st Quarter:

2nd Quarter:

3rd Quarter:

4th Quarter:

=== Week 10: at Utah Blaze ===
Scoring Summary:

1st Quarter:

2nd Quarter:

3rd Quarter:

4th Quarter:

=== Week 11: vs Chicago Rush ===
Scoring Summary:

1st Quarter:

2nd Quarter:

3rd Quarter:

4th Quarter:

=== Week 13: at Columbus Destroyers ===
Scoring Summary:

1st Quarter:

2nd Quarter:

3rd Quarter:

4th Quarter:

=== Week 14: at Philadelphia Soul ===
Scoring Summary:

1st Quarter:

2nd Quarter:

3rd Quarter:

4th Quarter:

=== Week 15: vs New Orleans VooDoo ===
Scoring Summary:

1st Quarter:

2nd Quarter:

3rd Quarter:

4th Quarter:

=== Week 16: vs New York Dragons ===
Scoring Summary:

1st Quarter:

2nd Quarter:

3rd Quarter:

4th Quarter:

=== Week 17: at Colorado Crush ===
Scoring Summary:

1st Quarter:

2nd Quarter:

3rd Quarter:

4th Quarter:

== Playoffs ==
=== Week 2: vs Columbus Destroyers ===
	1	2	3	4	Total
(6) CLB	21	7	17	21	66
(1) DAL	21	17	0	21	59

at the American Airlines Center in Dallas, Texas

The Destroyers blew a 30-point lead and lost to the Desperados earlier this season 53–51 and they lost the 2nd game in Columbus 56–47. This time, it looked as if Dallas, after a shaky start, would continue their dominance over the Destroyers. Leading 38–28 at the half, the tide turned on back-to-back kickoffs by Columbus kicker Peter Martinez. Dallas, who had deferred, got the opening kickoff. However, the ball bounced off the goalpost and into the hands of Columbus' Josh Bush. On the very next kickoff, a nearly identical play occurred when the ball again bounced off the goalpost and Columbus recovered at the 4-yard line. On the next play, Damien Groce ran the ball in to give Columbus a sudden 42–38 lead 58 seconds into the second half. After a Clint Dolezel interception set up a field goal for Columbus, Jason Shelley put the game away with a 28-yard reception with 12:55 left in the game to give Columbus a 2-touchdown lead that they held onto to pull off the upset against the Desperados.
