= Arena Football League Coach of the Year =

Award in American football management

The Arena Football League Coach of the Year award, later known as the Marcum-Moss Head Coach of the Year, was presented annually by various news and sports organizations to the Arena Football League (AFL) head coach who has done the most outstanding job of working with the talent he has at his disposal.

== AFL Coach of the Year ==
Year	Winner	Team
2019	Clint Dolezel (3)	Philadelphia Soul
2018	Omarr Smith	Baltimore Brigade
2017	Ron James (2)	Tampa Bay Storm
2016	Kevin Guy (2)	Arizona Rattlers
2016	Clint Dolezel (2)	Philadelphia Soul
2015	Clint Dolezel	Philadelphia Soul
2014	Steve Thonn	Cleveland Gladiators
2013	Bob McMillen	Chicago Rush
2012	Ron James	Utah Blaze
2011	Kevin Guy	Arizona Rattlers
2010	Les Moss	Jacksonville Sharks
2008	Mike Wilpolt	Cleveland Gladiators
2007	Doug Plank (2)	Georgia Force
2006	Will McClay	Dallas Desperados
2005	Doug Plank	Georgia Force
2004	Mike Neu	New Orleans VooDoo
2003	Todd Shell	New York Dragons
2002	Darren Arbet (2)	San Jose SaberCats
2001	Michael Trigg	Grand Rapids Rampage
2000	Darren Arbet	San Jose SaberCats
1999	Mike Dailey	Albany Firebirds
1998	Tim Marcum (2)	Tampa Bay Storm
1997	Eddie Khayat	Nashville Kats
1996	John Gregory (2)	Iowa Barnstormers
1995	John Gregory	Iowa Barnstormers
1994	Perry Moss (3)	Orlando Predators
1993	Danny White	Arizona Rattlers
1992	Perry Moss (2)	Orlando Predators
1991	Fran Curci	Tampa Bay Storm
1990	Ernie Stautner	Dallas Texans
1989	Babe Parilli	Denver Dynamite
1988	Perry Moss	Chicago Bruisers
1987	Tim Marcum	Denver Dynamite

- Clint Dolezel and Kevin Guy were co-winners of the award in 2016
