= Nick Browder =

American football player (born 1975)

No. 12
- Position: Quarterback

Personal information
- Born: April 8, 1975 (age 51); Milwaukee, Wisconsin, U.S.
- Listed height: 6 ft 2 in (1.88 m)
- Listed weight: 210 lb (95 kg)

Career information
- College: Valparaiso
- NFL draft: 1997: undrafted

Career history
- Green Bay Bombers (1999); Buffalo Destroyers (2000); Grand Rapids Rampage (2001); Detroit Fury (2002); Grand Rapids Rampage (2003); Philadelphia Soul (2004); Grand Rapids Rampage (2005); New York Dragons (2006); Dallas Desperados (2007)

Awards and highlights
- ArenaBowl champion (2001)

Career AFL statistics
- Comp. / Att.: 450 / 732
- Passing yards: 5,427
- TD–INT: 99–23
- Passer rating: 104.92
- Rushing TD: 8
- Stats at ArenaFan.com

Nick Browder (born April 8, 1975) is an American former professional football quarterback who played in the Arena Football League (AFL) for the Buffalo Destroyers (2000), the Grand Rapids Rampage (2001, 2003, 2005), the Detroit Fury (2002), and the Philadelphia Soul (2004) and the New York Dragons. In 2007, he signed with the Dallas Desperados as the backup to Clint Dolezel. He played college football at Valparaiso University. He is a member of the Valparaiso University Athletic Hall of Fame.

In 2006, he was signed by the New York Dragons after star quarterback Aaron Garcia went down for the season with an injury. When backup to Garcia, Juston Wood, also was injured for the season, Browder was brought into the game on March 12 against the Austin Wranglers. Browder led the team to a 10–6 record, 8–2 with Browder and a playoff berth, but they fell to the Georgia Force in the opening round.
