= 2008 Dallas Desperados season =

Arena Football League team season

- Head coach: Will McClay
- Home stadium: American Airlines Center

Results
- Record: 12–4
- Division place: 2nd
- Playoffs: Lost Wild Card Playoffs (Dragons) 63–77

The 2008 Dallas Desperados season was the seventh season for the franchise. The Desperados finished the regular season 12–4, but despite having the second best record in the National Conference, they made the playoffs as the 3rd seed because they did not win their division. Their Wild Card round opponent was the New York Dragons, a team which the Desperados had defeated in both regular season meetings. The Dragons, unfortunately for the Desperados, won the game that counted the most of the three, eliminating the Desperados from the playoffs by a score of 77–63.

== Standings ==
Eastern Division
Team	W	L	PCT	PF	PA	DIV	CONF	Home	Away
Philadelphia Soul^{(1)}	13	3	.813	992	810	7–1	9–2	7–1	6–2
Dallas Desperados^{(3)}	12	4	.750	861	798	6–2	9–2	6–2	6–2
Cleveland Gladiators^{(4)}	9	7	.563	901	895	4–4	5–6	6–2	3–5
New York Dragons^{(6)}	8	8	.500	822	819	2–6	4–7	5–3	3–5
Columbus Destroyers	3	13	.188	750	893	1–7	2–10	2–6	1–7

== Regular season schedule ==
Week	Date	Opponent	Result	Record	Location	Attendance	Recap
1	March 1	at Georgia Force	W 51–41	1–0	The Arena at Gwinnett Center	10,224	Recap
2	March 7	Columbus Destroyers	W 46–36	2–0	American Airlines Center	12,432	Recap
3	March 17	Colorado Crush	W 51–40	3–0	American Airlines Center	12,576	Recap
4	March 22	at San Jose SaberCats	W 59–56	4–0	HP Pavilion	11,472	Recap
5	March 30	at New York Dragons	W 33–31	5–0	Nassau Coliseum	8,216	Recap
6	April 5	Cleveland Gladiators	W 58–51	6–0	American Airlines Center	11,497	Recap
7	April 12	New Orleans VooDoo	W 55–44	7–0	American Airlines Center	12,314	Recap
8	Bye Week						
9	April 28	at Philadelphia Soul	L 28–57	7–1	Wachovia Spectrum	15,426	Recap
10	May 3	at Columbus Destroyers	W 48–45	8–1	Nationwide Arena	14,310	Recap
11	May 10	Grand Rapids Rampage	W 65–54	9–1	American Airlines Center	11,476	Recap
12	May 17	Arizona Rattlers	L 54–55	9–2	American Airlines Center	12,950	Recap
13	May 23	at Orlando Predators	W 67–41	10–2	Amway Arena	12,366	Recap
14	May 31	at Cleveland Gladiators	W 68–52	11–2	Quicken Loans Arena	11,717	Recap
15	June 7	Philadelphia Soul	L 64–71	11–3	American Airlines Center	11,943	Recap
16	June 14	New York Dragons	W 51–49	12–3	American Airlines Center	12,042	Recap
17	June 22	at Chicago Rush	L 63–75	12–4	Allstate Arena	16,260	Recap

== Playoff schedule ==
Round	Date	Opponent (seed)	Result	Location	Attendance	Recap
NC Wild Card	June 27	New York Dragons (6)	L 63–77	American Airlines Center	10,076	Recap

== Coaching ==
- Will McClay – Head Coach
- Steve Criswell – Assistant OL/FB
- Adriel Fenton – Defensive Quality Control/Special Teams Assistant
- James Fuller – Defensive Coordinator/Special Teams
- Tony Ollison – Strength and Conditioning Coach
- Phill Penn – Assistant Strength and Conditioning Coach
- Deatrich Wise – Dir. Player Programs/OL/DL/FB/LB

== Roster ==
2008 Dallas Desperados roster
Quarterbacks: 13 Clint Dolezel; 5 Chris Sanders; Fullbacks: 40 Josh White; Wide receivers: 17 Anthony Armstrong; 18 Josh Bush; 82 Marcus Nash; 2 Will Pettis	Offensive/Defensive linemen: 96 Jeremy Calahan; 66 Jeff Chase; 84 Terrance Dotsy; 90 Daleroy Stewart; 55 Colston Weatherington	Linebackers: 50 David Dixon; 45 Duke Pettijohn; Defensive backs: 37 Johnnie Harris; 20 Pete Hunter; 7 Jermaine Jones; 6 Bobby Perry; Kickers: 19 Remy Hamilton	Injured reserve: 2 Chris Brown DB; 77 Cyron Brown OL/DL; 21 Dennis DaShane DB; 11 Jason Fife QB; 94 Robert Pollard OL/DL; 9 Andrae Thurman WR; Practice Squad: 89 Troy Mason WR; 10 Perry Patterson QB; Rookies in italics Roster updated July 26, 2008; 19 Active, 8 Inactive

== Regular season ==
=== Week 1: at Georgia Force ===
Quarter	1	2	3	4	Total
DAL	14	13	7	17	51
GA	13	7	0	21	41

at The Arena at Gwinnett Center, Duluth, Georgia

- Date: March 1
- Game time: 1:00 PM EST
- Game attendance: 10,224

Game information

1st Quarter:

- 08:38 DAL – Will Pettis 1 yd pass from Clint Dolezel (Remy Hamilton kick) – 7–0 DAL
- 06:35 GA – Brent Holmes 5 yd pass from Chris Greisen (Carl Martinez kick failed) – 7–6 DAL
- 05:57 GA – Fred Coleman 0 yd fumble recovery (Carl Martinez kick) – 13–7 GA
- 01:21 DAL – Marcus Nash 8 yd pass from Clint Dolezel (Remy Hamilton kick) – 14–13 DAL

2nd Quarter:

- 13:07 GA – Troy Bergeron 5 yd pass from Chris Greisen (Carl Martinez kick) – 20–14 GA
- 08:57 DAL – Marcus Nash 10 yd pass from Clint Dolezel (Remy Hamilton kick) – 21–20 DAL
- 00:57 DAL – Will Pettis 11 yd pass from Clint Dolezel (Remy Hamilton kick failed) – 27–20 DAL

3rd Quarter:

- 12:33 DAL – Ant Armstrong 19 yd pass from Clint Dolezel (Remy Hamilton kick) – 34–20 DAL

4th Quarter:

- 12:57 GA – Brent Holmes 38 yd pass from Chris Greisen (Carl Martinez kick) – 34–27 DAL
- 08:10 DAL – Will Pettis 4 yd pass from Clint Dolezel (Remy Hamilton kick) – 41–27 DAL
- 06:29 GA – Carl Morris 12 yd pass from Chris Greisen (Carl Martinez kick) – 41–34 DAL
- 01:10 DAL – Ant Armstrong 6 yd pass from Clint Dolezel (Remy Hamilton kick) – 48–34 DAL
- 00:47 GA – Brent Holmes 44 yd pass from Chris Greisen (Carl Martinez kick) – 48–41 DAL
- 00:24 DAL – Remy Hamilton 20 yd field goal – 51–41 DAL
- Officials: Referee: Steve Pamon; Umpire: Tom Laverty; Linesman: Bill Ward; Line judge: Art Lucky; Back judge: Bud McCleskey
- Offensive Player of the Game: Clint Dolezel (DAL)
- Defensive Player of the Game: David Crocker (GA)
- Ironman Player of the Game: Will Pettis (DAL)

=== Week 2: vs. Columbus Destroyers ===
Quarter	1	2	3	4	Total
CLB	7	10	7	12	36
DAL	14	19	6	7	46

at American Airlines Center, Dallas, Texas

- Date: March 7
- Game time: 8:30 PM EST
- Game attendance: 12,432

Game information

1st Quarter:

- 09:04 DAL – SANDERS, Chris 4 yd run (HAMILTON, Remy kick) – 7–0 DAL
- 04:29 DAL – NASH, Marcus 26 yd pass from SANDERS, Chris (HAMILTON, Remy kick) – 14–0 DAL
- 02:36 CLB – LEE, Derek 40 yd pass from NAGY, Matt (LEWIS, Mark kick) – 14–7 DAL

2nd Quarter:

- 12:52 DAL – NASH, Marcus 15 yd pass from SANDERS, Chris (HAMILTON, Remy kick) – 21–7 DAL
- 11:08 CLB – LEE, Derek 42 yd pass from NAGY, Matt (LEWIS, Mark kick) – 21–14 DAL
- 07:28 DAL – NASH, Marcus 26 yd pass from SANDERS, Chris (HAMILTON, Remy kick failed) – 27–14 DAL
- 00:24 CLB – LEWIS, Mark 31 yd field goal – 27–17 DAL
- 00:10 DAL – PETTIS, Will 1 yd pass from SANDERS, Chris (HAMILTON, Remy kick failed) – 33–17 DAL

3rd Quarter:

- 09:18 CLB – LEE, Derek 3 yd pass from NAGY, Matt (LEWIS, Mark kick) – 33–24 DAL
- 06:08 DAL – PETTIS, Will 1 yd run (HAMILTON, Remy kick failed) – 39–24 DAL

4th Quarter:

- 14:53 CLB – WELLS, Harold 9 yd run (LEWIS, Mark kick failed) – 39–30 DAL
- 10:11 DAL – BUSH, Josh 3 yd pass from SANDERS, Chris (HAMILTON, Remy kick) – 46–30 DAL
- 03:38 CLB – LEE, Derek 10 yd pass from NAGY, Matt (MARSHALL, Rashe rush failed) – 46–36 DAL
- Officials: Referee: Tom McCabe; Umpire: Rick Podraza; Linesman: Rod Pearson; Line judge: Dana McKenzie; Back judge: Scott Helverson
- Offensive Player of the Game: Chris Sanders (DAL)
- Defensive Player of the Game: Bobby Perry (DAL)
- Ironman Player of the Game: Will Pettis (DAL)

=== Week 3: vs. Colorado Crush ===
Quarter	1	2	3	4	Total
COL	14	6	6	14	40
DAL	7	10	20	14	51

at American Airlines Center, Dallas, Texas

- Date: March 17
- Game time: 8:00 PM EST
- Game attendance: 12,576

Game information

1st Quarter:

- 12:46 COL – NELSON, Ben 8 yd pass from DUTTON, John (RUSH, Clay kick) – 7–0 COL
- 08:10 DAL – WHITE, Josh 2 yd run (HAMILTON, Remy kick) – 7–7
- 03:50 COL – THOMAS, Robert 1 yd run (RUSH, Clay kick) – 14–7 COL

2nd Quarter:

- 12:33 DAL – SANDERS, Chris 2 yd run (HAMILTON, Remy kick) – 14–14
- 07:25 DAL – HAMILTON, Remy 25 yd field goal – 17–14 DAL
- 05:10 COL – PYATT, Brad 15 yd pass from DUTTON, Johnn (RUSH, Clay kick failed) – 20–17 COL

3rd Quarter:

- 12:00 DAL – PETTIS, Will 14 yd pass from SANDERS, Chris (HAMILTON, Remy kick) – 24–20 DAL
- 09:03 COL – NELSON, Ben 5 yd pass from DUTTON, Johnn (RUSH, Clay kick failed) – 26–24 COL
- 07:49 DAL – PETTIS, Will 37 yd pass from SANDERS, Chris (HAMILTON, Remy kick failed) – 30–26 DAL
- 04:18 DAL – PETTIS, Will 7 yd pass from SANDERS, Chris (HAMILTON, Remy kick) – 36–37 DAL

4th Quarter:

- 13:05 DAL – PETTIS, Will 10 yd pass from SANDERS, Chris (HAMILTON, Remy kick) – 44–26 DAL
- 09:26 COL – NELSON, Ben 4 yd pass from DUTTON, John (RUSH, Clay kick failed) – 44–32 DAL
- 01:32 DAL – SANDERS, Chris 2 yd run (HAMILTON, Remy kick) – 51–32 DAL
- 00:31 COL – QUINNIE, Willie 8 yd pass from KIRSCH, Brandon (QUINNIE, Willie pass from KIRSCH, Brandon) – 51–40 DAL
- Officials: Referee: Pat Garvey; Umpire: Paul King; Linesman: Bill Ward; Line judge: Bob McElwee; Back judge: James DeBell
- Offensive Player of the Game: Chris Sanders (DAL)
- Defensive Player of the Game: Bobby Perry (DAL)
- Ironman Player of the Game: Will Pettis (DAL)

=== Week 4: at San Jose SaberCats ===
Quarter	1	2	3	4	Total
DAL	13	16	6	24	59
SJ	7	21	7	21	56

at HP Pavilion at San Jose, San Jose, California

- Date: March 22
- Game time: 10:30 PM EST
- Game attendance: 11,472

Game information

1st Quarter:

- 07:12 DAL – WHITE, Josh 1 yd run (HAMILTON, Remy kick) – 7–0 DAL
- 03:18 SJ – GRIEB, Mark 3 yd run (HAGLUND, A.J. kick) – 7–7
- 00:47 DAL – NASH, Marcus 6 yd pass from SANDERS, Chris (HAMILTON, Remy kick failed) – 13–7 DAL

2nd Quarter:

- 11:36 SJ – SAINTIL, Cleannord 7 yd pass from GRIEB, Mark (HAGLUND, A.J. kick) – 14–13 SJ
- 07:23 DAL – PETTIS, Will 3 yd run (HAMILTON, Remy kick) – 20–14 DAL
- 03:43 SJ – GEATHERS, Jason 10 yd pass from GRIEB, Mark (HAGLUND, A.J. kick) – 21–20 SJ
- 00:56 DAL – NASH, Marcus 20 yd pass from SANDERS, Chris (HAMILTON, Remy kick failed) – 26–21 DAL
- 00:28 SJ – SAINTIL, Cleannord 5 yd pass from GRIEB, Mark (HAGLUND, A.J. kick) – 28–26 SJ
- 00:03 DAL – HAMILTON, Remy 25 yd field goal – 29–28 DAL

3rd Quarter:

- 08:07 DAL – ARMSTRONG, Anthony 13 yd pass from SANDERS, Chris (HAMILTON, Remy kick failed) – 35–28 DAL
- 01:17 SJ – JOHNSON, Brian 1 yd run (HAGLUND, A.J. kick) – 35–35

4th Quarter:

- 13:38 DAL – DOTSY, Terrance 5 yd pass from SANDERS, Chris (HAMILTON, Remy kick) – 42–35 DAL
- 10:21 SJ – SAINTIL, Cleannord 7 yd pass from GRIEB, Mark (HAGLUND, A.J. kick) – 42–42
- 09:08 DAL – ARMSTRONG, Anthony 4 yd pass from SANDERS, Chris (HAMILTON, Remy kick) – 49–42 DAL
- 04:53 SJ – ROE, James 8 yd pass from GRIEB, Mark (HAGLUND, A.J. kick) – 49–49
- 03:42 DAL – ARMSTRONG, Anthony 48 yd pass from SANDERS, Chris (HAMILTON, Remy kick) – 56–49 DAL
- 00:34 DAL – HAMILTON, Remy 45 yd field goal – 59–49 DAL
- 00:00 SJ – ROE, James 10 yd pass from GRIEB, Mark (HAGLUND, A.J. kick) – 59–56 DAL
- Officials: Dennis Lipski, Rick Nelson, Brent Durbin, Darrell Leftwic, Reggie Smith, David Harwood
- Offensive Player of the Game: Cleannord Saintil (SJ)
- Defensive Player of the Game: Johnnie Harris (DAL)
- Ironman Player of the Game: Josh White (DAL)

=== Week 5: at New York Dragons ===
Quarter	1	2	3	4	Total
DAL	14	0	3	16	33
NY	7	10	14	0	31

at Nassau Veterans Memorial Coliseum, Uniondale, New York

- Date: March 30
- Game time: 3:00 PM EST
- Game attendance: 8,216

Game information

1st Quarter:

- 13:52 DAL – Josh White 3 yd run (Remy Hamilton kick) – 7–0 DAL
- 09:24 NY – Chris Anthony 9 yd pass from Aaron Garcia (Chris Onorato kick) – 7–7
- 03:15 DAL – Will Pettis 21 yd pass from Chris Sanders (Remy Hamilton kick) – 14–7 DAL

2nd Quarter:

- 09:38 NY – Kevin Swayne 2 yd pass from Aaron Garcia (Chris Onorato kick) – 14–14
- 00:26 NY – Chris Onorato 19 yd field goal – 17–14 NY

3rd Quarter:

- 12:57 NY – Chris Anthony 28 yd pass from Aaron Garcia (Chris Onorato kick) – 24–14 NY
- 06:36 DAL – Remy Hamilton 24 yd field goal – 24–17 NY
- 04:12 NY – Angel Estrada 43 yd interception return (Chris Onorato kick) – 31–17 NY

4th Quarter:

- 13:03 DAL – Marcus Nash 9 yd pass from Chris Sanders – (Remy Hamilton kick) 31–24 NY
- 06:19 DAL – Marcus Nash 7 yd pass from Chris Sanders – (Remy Hamilton kick) 31–31
- 02:01 DAL – Colston Weatherington safety – 33–31 DAL
- Officials: Dave Lambros, Doug Wilson, Kelly Saalfeld, Brian Matthew, Rich Wilborn, Robert Benson.
- Offensive Player of the Game: Marcus Nash (DAL)
- Defensive Player of the Game: Henry Taylor (NYD)
- Ironman Player of the Game: Will Pettis (DAL)

=== Week 6: vs. Cleveland Gladiators ===
Quarter	1	2	3	4	Total
CLE	7	17	10	17	51
DAL	7	21	20	10	58

at American Airlines Center, Dallas, Texas

- Date: April 5
- Game time: 8:00 PM EST
- Game attendance: 11,497

Game information

1st Quarter:

- 09:42 DAL – PERRY, Bobby 33 yd interception return (HAMILTON, Remy kick) – 7–0 DAL
- 02:51 CLE – JACKSON, Marlion 1 yd run (BALL, Jason kick) – 7–7

2nd Quarter:

- 11:16 DAL – DOLEZEL, Clint 2 yd run (HAMILTON, Remy kick) – 14–7 DAL
- 09:20 CLE – AMEY, Otis 25 yd pass from PHILYAW, Raymon (BALL, Jason kick) – 14–14
- 06:36 DAL – NASH, Marcus 43 yd pass from DOLEZEL, Clint (HAMILTON, Remy kick) – 21–14 DAL
- 00:47 CLE – REDD, Robert 5 yd pass from PHILYAW, Raymon (BALL, Jason kick) – 21–21
- 00:28 DAL – NASH, Marcus 10 yd pass from DOLEZEL, Clint (HAMILTON, Remy kick) – 28–21 DAL
- 00:00 CLE – BALL, Jason 28 yd field goal – 28–24 DAL

3rd Quarter:

- 09:43 CLE – BALL, Jason 22 yd field goal 28–27 DAL
- 07:56 DAL – NASH, Marcus 4 yd pass from DOLEZEL, Clint (HAMILTON, Remy kick) – 35–27 DAL
- 07:07 DAL – DIXON, David 0 yd net recovery (HAMILTON, Remy kick failed) – 41–27 DAL
- 03:21 CLE – AMEY, Otis 11 yd pass from PHILYAW, Raymon (BALL, Jason kick) – 41–34 DAL
- 00:12 DAL – NASH, Marcus 23 yd pass from DOLEZEL, Clint (HAMILTON, Remy kick) – 48–34 DAL

4th Quarter:

- 11:33 CLE – MINUCCI, Joe 2 yd pass from PHILYAW, Raymon (BALL, Jason kick) – 48–41 DAL
- 06:10 DAL – NASH, Marcus 4 yd pass from DOLEZEL, Clint (HAMILTON, Remy kick) – 55–41 DAL
- 03:09 CLE – RICHARDSON, Ram 3 yd pass from PHILYAW, Raymon (BALL, Jason kick) – 55–48 DAL
- 00:22 DAL – HAMILTON, Remy 20 yd field goal – 58–48 DAL
- 00:03 CLE – BALL, Jason 26 yd field goal – 58–51 DAL
- Officials: Referee: Dave Cutaia; Umpire: Al Granado; Linesman: Mike McCabe; Line judge: Art Lucky; Back judge: James Cole
- Offensive Player of the Game: Clint Dolezel (DAL)
- Defensive Player of the Game: Bobby Perry (DAL)
- Ironman Player of the Game: Will Pettis (DAL)

=== Week 7: vs. New Orleans VooDoo ===
Quarter	1	2	3	4	Total
NO	3	21	13	7	44
DAL	7	20	21	7	55

at American Airlines Center, Dallas, Texas

- Date: April 12
- Game time: 8:00 PM EST
- Game attendance: 12,314

Game information

1st Quarter:

- 11:10 DAL – NASH, Marcus 14 yd pass from DOLEZEL, Clint (HAMILTON, Remy kick) – 7–0 DAL
- 04:35 NO – FRANCE, Todd 18 yd field goal – 7–3 DAL

2nd Quarter:

- 13:46 DAL – PETTIS, Will 7 yd pass from DOLEZEL, Clint (HAMILTON, Remy kick failed) – 13–3 DAL
- 12:31 NO – WILLIAMS, Wendall 35 yd pass from WIMPRIE, Danny (FRANCE, Todd kick) – 13–10 DAL
- 11:18 DAL – PETTIS, Will 30 yd pass from DOLEZEL, Clint (HAMILTON, Remy kick) – 20–10 DAL
- 10:21 NO – WILLIAMS, Wendall 56 yd kickoff return (FRANCE, Todd kick) – 20–17 DAL
- 06:06 DAL – PETTIS, Will 26 yd pass from DOLEZEL, Clint (HAMILTON, Remy kick) – 27–17 DAL
- 03:43 NO – DUDLEY, Javarus 19 yd pass from WIMPRIE, Danny (FRANCE, Todd kick) – 27–24 DAL

3rd Quarter:

- 13:45 NO – LeJEUNE, Norman 18 yd interception return (FRANCE, Todd kick) – 31–27 NO
- 08:59 DAL – PETTIS, Will 1 yd run (HAMILTON, Remy kick) 34–31 DAL
- 06:48 NO – DUDLEY, Javarus 26 yd pass from WIMPRIE, Danny (FRANCE, Todd kick failed) – 37–34 NO
- 03:33 DAL – PETTIS, Will 9 yd pass from DOLEZEL, Clint (HAMILTON, Remy kick) – 41–37 DAL
- 01:54 DAL – ARMSTRONG, Anthony 20 yd pass from DOLEZEL, Clint (HAMILTON, Remy kick) – 48–37 DAL

4th Quarter:

- 08:09 DAL – PETTIS, Will 1 yd pass from DOLEZEL, Clint (HAMILTON, Remy kick) – 55–37 DAL
- 05:20 NO – JORDAN, James 4 yd pass from WIMPRIE, Danny (FRANCE, Todd kick) – 55–44 DAL
- Officials: Referee: Riley Johnson; Umpire: Rick Lowe; Linesman: Julian Mapp; Line judge: RG Detillier; Back judge: Bud McCleskey
- Offensive Player of the Game: Clint Dolezel (DAL)
- Defensive Player of the Game: Colston Weatherington (DAL)
- Ironman Player of the Game: Will Pettis (DAL)

=== Week 8 ===
Bye Week

=== Week 9: at Philadelphia Soul ===
Quarter	1	2	3	4	Total
DAL	0	13	7	8	28
PHI	14	23	6	14	57

at Wachovia Center, Philadelphia, Pennsylvania

- Date: April 28
- Game time: 8:00 PM EST
- Game attendance: 15,426

Game information

1st Quarter:

- 12:02 PHI – D'ORAZIO 7 yd run (HUGHES kick) – 7–0 PHI
- 02:12 PHI – BRACKINS 17 yd pass from D'ORAZIO (HUGHES kick) – 14–0 PHI

2nd Quarter:

- 08:40 PHI – WATTS 4 yd pass from D'ORAZIO (HUGHES kick) – 21–0 PHI
- 04:51 DAL – DOLEZEL 1 yd run (HAMILTON kick blocked) – 21–6 PHI
- 04:51 PHI – BROWN PAT return – 23–6 PHI
- 00:53 PHI – BOGEL 3 yd pass from D'ORAZIO (HUGHES kick) – 30–6 PHI
- 00:33 DAL – DOLEZEL 2 yd run (HAMILTON kick) – 30–13 PHI
- 00:04 PHI – BRACKINS 17 yd pass from D'ORAZIO (HUGHES kick) – 37–13 PHI

3rd Quarter:

- 13:37 DAL – PETTIS 22 yd pass from DOLEZEL (HAMILTON kick) – 37–20 PHI
- 09:51 PHI – JACKSON 17 yd pass from D'ORAZIO (HUGHES kick failed) – 43–20 PHI

4th Quarter:

- 14:56 PHI – D'ORAZIO 1 yd run (HUGHES kick) – 50–20 PHI
- 11:47 DAL – PETTIS 25 yd pass from DOLEZEL (NASH pass from DOLEZEL) – 50–28 PHI
- 09:20 PHI – BRACKINS 12 yd pass from D'ORAZIO (HUGHES kick) – 57–28 PHI
- Officials: Referee: Perry Havener; Umpire: Tom Laverly; Linesman: Kavin McGrath; Line judge: David Meslow; Back judge: Keith Washington; Field judge: Jerry Trice
- Offensive Player of the Game: Matt D'Orazio (PHI)
- Defensive Player of the Game: Eddie Moten (PHI)
- Ironman Player of the Game: Mike Brown (PHI)

=== Week 10: at Columbus Destroyers ===
Quarter	1	2	3	4	Total
DAL	14	6	14	14	48
CLB	13	20	6	6	45

at Nationwide Arena, Columbus, Ohio

- Date: May 3
- Game time: 7:00 PM EST
- Game attendance: 14,310

Game information

1st Quarter:

- 12:02 CLB – LEE, Derek 7 yd pass from NAGY, Matt (LEWIS, Mark kick) – 7–0 CLB
- 09:11 DAL – PETTIS, Will 12 yd pass from DOLEZEL, Clint (HAMILTON, Remy kick) – 7–7
- 07:55 CLB – JOHNSON, C.J. 9 yd pass from NAGY, Matt (LEWIS, Mark kick failed) – 13–7 CLB
- 03:14 DAL – NASH, Marcus 3 yd pass from DOLEZEL, Clint (HAMILTON, Remy kick) – 14–13 DAL

2nd Quarter:

- 10:34 CLB – NAGY, Matt 1 yd run (LEWIS, Mark kick) – 20–14 CLB
- 06:23 CLB – NAGY, Matt 1 yd run (LEWIS, Mark kick) – 27–14 CLB
- 04:00 DAL – PETTIS, Will 19 yd pass from DOLEZEL, Clint (HAMILTON, Remy kick failed) – 27–20 CLB
- 00:07 CLB – LAZARE-SAUNDERS 1 yd pass from NAGY, Matt (LEWIS, Mark kick failed) – 33–20 CLB

3rd Quarter:

- 11:57 DAL – NASH, Marcus 39 yd pass from DOLEZEL, Clint (HAMILTON, Remy kick) – 33–27 CLB
- 09:16 CLB – LEE, Derek 34 yd pass from NAGY, Matt (LEWIS, Mark kick blocked) – 39–27 CLB
- 07:05 DAL – NASH, Marcus 26 yd pass from DOLEZEL, Clint (HAMILTON, Remy kick) – 39–34 CLB

4th Quarter:

- 13:31 DAL – NASH, Marcus 17 yd pass from DOLEZEL, Clint (HAMILTON, Remy kick) – 41–39 DAL
- 00:40 CLB – WELLS, Harold 3 yd run (NAGY, Matt pass failed) – 45–41 CLB
- 00:15 DAL – PETTIS, Will 9 yd pass from DOLEZEL, Clint (HAMILTON, Remy kick) – 48–45 DAL
- Officials: Referee: Dave Lambros; Umpire: Doug Wilson; Linesman: Kelly Saalfield; Line judge: Brian Matthew; Back judge: Rich Wilborn
- Offensive Player of the Game: N/A
- Defensive Player of the Game: N/A
- Ironman Player of the Game: N/A

=== Week 11: vs. Grand Rapids Rampage ===
Quarter	1	2	3	4	Total
GR	13	17	14	10	54
DAL	16	21	14	14	65

at American Airlines Center, Dallas, Texas

- Date: May 10
- Game time: 8:00 PM EST
- Game attendance: 11,476

Game information

1st Quarter:

- 14:28 GR – HIGGINS, Kenny 45 yd pass from MACPHERSON, James (GOWINS, Brian kick failed) – 6–0 GR
- 12:11 DAL – WHITE, Josh 17 yd pass from DOLEZEL, Clint (HAMILTON, Remy kick) – 7–6 DAL
- 10:07 DAL – STEWART, Dalero safety – 9–6 DAL
- 04:20 DAL – DIXON, David 3 yd run (HAMILTON, Remy kick) – 16–6 DAL
- 00:34 GR – JOHNSON, Chris 16 yd pass from MACPHERSON, James (GOWINS, Brian kick) – 16–13 DAL

2nd Quarter:

- 12:31 DAL – NASH, Marcus 7 yd pass from DOLEZEL, Clint (HAMILTON, Remy kick) – 23–13 DAL
- 09:26 GR – GOWINS, Brian 50 yd field goal – 23–16 DAL
- 06:07 DAL – NASH, Marcus 8 yd pass from DOLEZEL, Clint (HAMILTON, Remy kick) – 30–16 DAL
- 01:49 GR – HIGGINS, Kenny 25 yd pass from MACPHERSON, James (GOWINS, Brian kick) – 30–23 DAL
- 00:30 DAL – NASH, Marcus 25 yd pass from DOLEZEL, Clint (HAMILTON, Remy kick) – 37–23 DAL
- 00:02 GR – LEWIS, Jermaine 8 yd pass from MACPHERSON, James (GOWINS, Brian kick) – 37–30 DAL

3rd Quarter:

- 13:48 DAL – NASH, Marcus 15 yd pass from DOLEZEL, Clint (HAMILTON, Remy kick) – 44–30 DAL
- 10:06 GR – LEWIS, Jermaine 17 yd pass from MACPHERSON, James (GOWINS, Brian kick) – 44–37 DAL
- 03:21 GR – JOHNSON, Chris 16 yd pass from MACPHERSON, James (GOWINS, Brian kick) – 44–44
- 02:13 DAL – NASH, Marcus 45 yd pass from DOLEZEL, Clint (HAMILTON, Remy kick) – 51–44 DAL

4th Quarter:

- 13:53 GR – HIGGINS, Kenny 5 yd pass from MACPHERSON, James (GOWINS, Brian kick) – 51–51
- 11:00 DAL – NASH, Marcus 6 yd pass from DOLEZEL, Clint (HAMILTON, Remy kick) – 58–51 DAL
- 06:26 GR – GOWINS, Brian 24 yd field goal – 58–54 DAL
- 05:07 DAL – CALAHAN, Jeremy 3 yd pass from DOLEZEL, Clint (HAMILTON, Remy kick) – 65–54 DAL
- Officials: Referee: Bill Athan; Umpire: Matt Jordan; Linesman: Allen Baynes; Line judge: Rusty Baynes; Back judge: Greg Wilson
- Offensive Player of the Game: Clint Dolezel (DAL)
- Defensive Player of the Game: Daleroy Stewart (DAL)
- Ironman Player of the Game: Will Pettis (DAL)

=== Week 12: vs. Arizona Rattlers ===
Quarter	1	2	3	4	Total
ARZ	0	15	13	27	55
DAL	7	7	21	19	54

at American Airlines Center, Dallas, Texas

- Date: May 17
- Game time: 8:00 PM EST
- Game attendance: 12,950

Game information

1st Quarter:

- 14:54 DAL – BUSH, Josh 56 yd kickoff return (HAMILTON, Remy kick) – 7–0 DAL

2nd Quarter:

- 09:01 ARZ – HARVEY, Trandon 3 yd pass from SMOKER, Jeff (HOULE, Eric kick) – 7–7
- 05:41 DAL – THURMAN, Andrae 24 yd pass from DOLEZEL, Clint (HAMILTON, Remy kick) – 14–7 DAL
- 00:00 ARZ – HARVEY, Trandon −4 yd missed FG return (ROBINSON, Chris rush) – 15–14 ARZ

3rd Quarter:

- 11:23 ARZ – HARVEY, Trandon 22 yd pass from SMOKER, Jeff (HOULE, Eric kick failed) – 21–14 ARZ
- 09:42 DAL – BUSH, Josh 26 yd pass from DOLEZEL, Clint (HAMILTON, Remy kick) – 21–21
- 08:23 ARZ – BURLEY, Siaha 43 yd pass from SMOKER, Jeff (HOULE, Eric kick) 28–21 ARZ
- 05:58 DAL – THURMAN, Andrae 28 yd pass from DOLEZEL, Clint (HAMILTON, Remy kick) – 28–28
- 01:44 DAL – DOLEZEL, Clint 2 yd run (HAMILTON, Remy kick) – 35–28 DAL

4th Quarter:

- 12:28 ARZ – DEVOE, Todd 5 yd pass from SMOKER, Jeff (HOULE, Eric kick) – 35–35
- 08:39 DAL – WHITE, Josh 12 yd run (HAMILTON, Remy kick) – 42–35 ARZ
- 05:12 ARZ – HARVEY, Trandon 17 yd pass from SMOKER, Jeff (HOULE, Eric kick) – 42–42
- 03:57 DAL – ARMSTRONG, Anth 48 yd pass from DOLEZEL, Clint (HAMILTON, Remy kick failed) – 48–42 DAL
- 00:31 ARZ – BURLEY, Siaha 27 yd pass from SMOKER, Jeff (HOULE, Eric kick) – 49–48 ARZ
- 00:18 DAL – ARMSTRONG, Anth 41 yd pass from DOLEZEL, Clint (DOLEZEL, Clint pass failed) – 54–49 DAL
- 00:00 ARZ – DEVOE, Todd 16 yd pass from SMOKER, Jeff (SMOKER, Jeff pass failed) – 55–54 ARZ
- Officials: Referee: Dave Lambros; Umpire: Doug Wilson; Linesman: Kavin McGrath; Line judge: Brian Matthew; Back judge: Rich Wilborn
- Offensive Player of the Game: Trandon Harvey (ARZ)
- Defensive Player of the Game: Colston Weatherington (DAL)
- Ironman Player of the Game: Trandon Harvey (ARZ)

=== Week 13: at Orlando Predators ===
Quarter	1	2	3	4	Total
DAL	7	21	25	14	67
ORL	14	14	6	7	41

at Amway Arena, Orlando, Florida

- Date: May 23
- Game time: 8:30 PM EST
- Game attendance: 12,366

Game information

1st Quarter:

- 12:02 ORL – MOYE-MOORE, M. 1 yd run (VAUGHN, John kick)- 7–0 ORL
- 03:50 DAL – NASH, Marcus 6 yd pass from DOLEZEL, Clint (HAMILTON, Remy kick)- 7–7
- 00:38 ORL – NICKERSON, K. 30 yd pass from STAFFORD, Shane (VAUGHN, John kick)- 14–7 ORL

2nd Quarter:

- 12:02 DAL – ARMSTRONG, A. 3 yd pass from PETTIS, Will (HAMILTON, Remy kick)- 14–14
- 07:22 DAL – DOLEZEL, Clint 8 yd run (HAMILTON, Remy kick)- 21–14 DAL
- 03:28 ORL – NICKERSON, K. 4 yd pass from STAFFORD, Shane (VAUGHN, John kick)- 21–21
- 02:12 DAL – NASH, Marcus 40 yd pass from DOLEZEL, Clint (HAMILTON, Remy kick)- 28–21 DAL
- 01:00 ORL – TOLIVER, T.T. 9 yd pass from STAFFORD, Shane (VAUGHN, John kick)- 28–28

3rd Quarter:

- 13:44 DAL – PETTIS, Will 5 yd run (HAMILTON, Remy kick)- 35–28 DAL
- 11:26 DAL – PETTIS, Will 1 yd pass from DOLEZEL, Clint (HAMILTON, Remy kick)- 42–28 DAL
- 10:34 DAL – SIMPKINS, R. safety- 44–28 DAL
- 05:36 DAL – TEAM safety- 46–28 DAL
- 05:11 DAL – ARMSTRONG, A. 6 yd pass from DOLEZEL, Clint (HAMILTON, Remy kick)- 53–28 DAL
- 01:35 ORL – NICKERSON, K. 5 yd pass from EATON, Jake (VAUGHN, John kick failed)- 53–34 DAL

4th Quarter:

- 13:29 DAL – PETTIS, Will 42 yd interception return (HAMILTON, Remy kick)- 60–34 DAL
- 05:42 DAL – WHITE, Josh 8 yd run (HAMILTON, Remy kick)- 67–34 DAL
- 00:50 ORL – TOLIVER, T.T. 12 yd pass from EATON, Jake (VAUGHN, John kick)- 67–41 DAL
- Officials: Referee: Perry Havener; Umpire: Tom Laverty; Linesman: Kelly Saalfeld; Line judge: David Meslow; Back judge: K. Washington
- Offensive Player of the Game: Clint Dolezel (DAL)
- Defensive Player of the Game: Bobby Perry (DAL)
- Ironman Player of the Game: Will Pettis (DAL)

=== Week 14: at Cleveland Gladiators ===
Quarter	1	2	3	4	Total
DAL	7	27	14	20	68
CLE	10	21	14	7	52

at Quicken Loans Arena, Cleveland, Ohio

- Date: May 31
- Game time: 8:00 PM EST
- Game attendance: 11,717

Game information

1st Quarter:

- 09:43 CLE – Jason Ball 41 yd field goal – 3–0 CLE
- 04:20 DAL – Anthony Armstrong 3 yd pass from Will Pettis (Remy Hamilton kick) – 7–3 DAL
- 00:43 CLE – Marlion Jackson 4 yd run (Jason Ball kick) – 10–7 CLE

2nd Quarter:

- 13:52 DAL – Will Pettis 21 yd pass from Clint Dolezel (Remy Hamilton kick failed) – 13–10 DAL
- 10:48 DAL – Marcus Nash 10 yd pass from Clint Dolezel (Remy Hamilton kick) – 20–10 DAL
- 05:48 CLE – Marlion Jackson 2 yd run (Jason Ball kick) – 20–17 DAL
- 03:19 DAL – Anthony Armstrong 2 yd pass from Clint Dolezel (Remy Hamilton kick) – 27–17 DAL
- 01:49 CLE – Marlion Jackson 1 yd run (Jason Ball kick) – 27–24 DAL
- 00:56 DAL – Will Pettis 5 yd pass from Clint Dolezel (Remy Hamilton kick) – 34–24 DAL
- 00:09 CLE – Otis Amey 12 yd pass from Raymond Philyaw (Jason Ball kick) – 34–21 DAL

3rd Quarter:

- 11:59 DAL – Anthony Armstrong 13 yd pass from Clint Dolezel (Remy Hamilton kick) – 41–31 DAL
- 10:10 CLE – Otis Amey 20 yd pass from Raymond Philyaw (Jason Ball kick) – 41–38 DAL
- 06:59 DAL – Will Pettis 9 yd pass from Clint Dolezel (Remy Hamilton kick) – 48–38 DAL
- 02:27 CLE – Otis Amey 7 yd pass from Raymond Philyaw (Jason Ball kick) – 48–45 DAL

4th Quarter:

- 10:17 DAL – Will Pettis 2 yd run (Remy Hamilton kick) – 55–45 DAL
- 04:48 DAL – Marcus Nash 9 yd pass from Clint Dolezel (Remy Hamilton kick) – 62–45 DAL
- 02:38 CLE – Otis Amey 12 yd pass from Raymond Philyaw (Jason Ball kick) – 62–52 DAL
- 00:56 DAL – Will Pettis 2 yd pass from Clint Dolezel (Remy Hamilton kick failed) – 68–52 DAL
- Officials: N/A
- Offensive Player of the Game: Otis Amey (CLE)
- Defensive Player of the Game: Brandon Hefflin (CLE)
- Ironman Player of the Game: Will Pettis (DAL)

=== Week 15: vs. Philadelphia Soul ===
Quarter	1	2	3	4	Total
PHI	14	28	14	15	71
DAL	21	15	14	14	64

at American Airlines Center, Dallas, Texas

- Date: June 7
- Game time: 8:00 PM EST
- Game attendance: 11,943

Game information

1st Quarter:

- 14:03 PHI – JACKSON, Chris 33 yd pass from GRAZIANI, Tony (HUGHES, Connor kick) – 7–0 PHI
- 10:18 DAL – PETTIS, Will 14 yd pass from DOLEZEL, Clint (HAMILTON, Remy kick) – 7–7
- 08:35 DAL – PERRY, Bobby 19 yd interception return (HAMILTON, Remy kick) – 14–7 DAL
- 06:28 PHI – JACKSON, Chris 31 yd pass from GRAZIANI, Tony (HUGHES, Connor kick) – 14–14
- 02:57 DAL – ARMSTRONG, Anth 28 yd pass from DOLEZEL, Clint (HAMILTON, Remy kick) – 21–14 DAL

2nd Quarter:

- 14:57 PHI – JACKSON, Chris 2 yd pass from GRAZIANI, Tony (HUGHES, Connor kick) – 21–21
- 09:10 DAL – WHITE, Josh 1 yd run (HAMILTON, Remy kick failed) – 27–21 DAL
- 04:53 PHI – JACKSON, Chris 10 yd pass from D'ORAZIO, Matt (HUGHES, Connor kick) – 28–27 PHI
- 04:01 DAL – BUSH, Josh 56 yd kickoff return (HAMILTON, Remy kick failed) – 33–28 DAL
- 02:44 PHI – D'ORAZIO, Matt 6 yd run (HUGHES, Connor kick) – 35–33 PHI
- 00:13 PHI – HOLMES, Brent 9 yd pass from D'ORAZIO, Matt (HUGHES, Connor kick) – 42–33 PHI
- 00:00 DAL – HAMILTON, Remy 36 yd field goal – 42–36 PHI

3rd Quarter:

- 11:23 DAL – WHITE, Josh 2 yd run (HAMILTON, Remy kick) – 43–42 DAL
- 09:01 PHI – JACKSON, Chris 4 yd pass from D'ORAZIO, Matt (HUGHES, Connor kick) – 49–43 PHI
- 06:36 DAL – ARMSTRONG, Anth 21 yd pass from DOLEZEL, Clint (HAMILTON, Remy kick) – 50–49 DAL
- 00:27 PHI – BRACKINS, Larry 6 yd pass from D'ORAZIO, Matt (HUGHES, Connor kick) – 56–50 PHI

4th Quarter:

- 11:02 DAL – WHITE, Josh 2 yd run (HAMILTON, Remy kick) – 57–56 DAL
- 05:25 PHI – SMITH, Clifton 1 yd run (HUGHES, Connor kick) – 63–57 PHI
- 02:48 DAL – ARMSTRONG, Anth 24 yd pass from DOLEZEL, Clint (HAMILTON, Remy kick) – 64–63 DAL
- 00:55 PHI – JACKSON, Chris 9 yd pass from D'ORAZIO, Matt (D'ORAZIO, Matt rush) – 71–64 PHI
- Officials: Referee: Riley Johnson; Umpire: Wes Fritz; Linesman: Neil Brunner; Line judge: Paul Engelberts; Back judge: Tony Lombardo
- Offensive Player of the Game: Chris Jackson (PHI)
- Defensive Player of the Game: Bobby Perry (DAL)
- Ironman Player of the Game: Josh White (DAL)

=== Week 16: vs. New York Dragons ===
Quarter	1	2	3	4	Total
NY	7	7	21	14	49
DAL	14	17	13	7	51

at American Airlines Center, Dallas, Texas

- Date: June 14
- Game time: 8:00 PM EST
- Game attendance: 12,042

Game information

1st Quarter:

- 12:53 NY – SWAYNE, Kevin 3 yd pass from GARCIA, Aaron (AZAR, Steve kick) – 7–0 NY
- 10:42 DAL – THURMAN, Andrae 14 yd pass from DOLEZEL, Clint (HAMILTON, Remy kick) – 7–7
- 05:26 DAL – DOLEZEL, Clint 1 yd run (HAMILTON, Remy kick) – 14–7 DAL

2nd Quarter:

- 11:45 DAL – ARMSTRONG, Anth 18 yd pass from DOLEZEL, Clint (HAMILTON, Remy kick) – 21–7 DAL
- 07:08 DAL – THURMAN, Andrae 19 yd pass from DOLEZEL, Clint (HAMILTON, Remy kick) – 28–7 DAL
- 00:54 NY – PRICE, Idris 1 yd run (AZAR, Steve kick) – 28–14 DAL
- 00:01 DAL – HAMILTON, Remy 17 yd field goal – 31–14 DAL

3rd Quarter:

- 14:48 DAL – BUSH, Josh 56 yd kickoff return (HAMILTON, Remy kick) – 38–14 DAL
- 09:58 NY – PRICE, Idris 2 yd run (AZAR, Steve kick) – 38–21 DAL
- 07:10 NY – ANTHONY, Chris 3 yd pass from GARCIA, Aaron (AZAR, Steve kick) – 38–28 DAL
- 04:01 DAL – NASH, Marcus 13 yd pass from DOLEZEL, Clint (HAMILTON, Remy kick failed) – 44–28 DAL
- 03:00 NY – SWAYNE, Kevin 17 yd pass from GARCIA, Aaron (AZAR, Steve kick) – 44–35 DAL

4th Quarter:

- 11:12 NY – WILLIS, Jason 16 yd pass from GARCIA, Aaron (AZAR, Steve kick) – 44–42 DAL
- 01:27 DAL – THURMAN, Andrae 4 yd pass from DOLEZEL, Clint (HAMILTON, Remy kick) – 51–42 DAL
- 00:07 NY – WILLIS, Jason 2 yd pass from GARCIA, Aaron (AZAR, Steve kick) – 51–49 DAL
- Officials: Referee: Perry Havener; Umpire: Tom Laverty; Linesman: Allen Baynes; Line judge: David Meslow; Back judge: Ke. Washington
- Offensive Player of the Game: Clint Dolezel (DAL)
- Defensive Player of the Game: Donvetis Franklin (DAL)
- Ironman Player of the Game: Josh Bush (DAL)

=== Week 17: at Chicago Rush ===
Quarter	1	2	3	4	Total
DAL	14	21	0	28	63
CHI	21	14	13	27	75

at Allstate Arena, Rosemont, Illinois

- Date: June 22
- Game time: 4:00 PM EST
- Game attendance: 16,260

Game information

1st Quarter:

- 14:47 CHI – Dan Alexander 0 yd fumble recovery (Todd France kick) – 7–0 CHI
- 13:56 DAL – Josh Bush 56 yd kickoff return (Remy Hamilton kick) – 7–7
- 09:04 CHI – Dan Alexander 1 yd run (Todd France kick) – 14–7 CHI
- 04:26 DAL – Marcus Nash 22 yd pass from Clint Dolezel (Remy Hamilton kick) – 14–14
- 00:41 CHI – Donovan Morgan 5 yd pass from Russ Michna (Todd France kick) – 21–14 CHI

2nd Quarter:

- 11:04 DAL – Anthony Armstrong 8 yd pass from Clint Dolezel (Remy Hamilton kick) – 21–21
- 07:22 CHI – Damian Harrell 19 yd pass from Russ Michna (Todd France kick) – 28–21 CHI
- 03:21 DAL – Andrae Thurman 10 yd pass from Clint Dolezel (Remy Hamilton kick) – 28–28
- 00:41 CHI – Donovan Morgan 3 yd pass from Russ Michna (Todd France kick) – 35–28 CHI
- 00:00 DAL – Marcus Nash 7 yd pass from Clint Dolezel (Remy Hamilton kick) – 35–35

3rd Quarter:

- 09:46 CHI – Damian Harrell 5 yd pass from Russ Michna (Todd France kick) – 42–35 CHI
- 03:42 CHI – Russ Michna 1 yd run (Todd France kick failed) – 48–35 CHI

4th Quarter:

- 13:11 CHI – John Peaua 3 yd run (Todd France kick) – 55–35 CHI
- 09:30 DAL – Chris Sanders 2 yd run (Remy Hamilton kick) – 55–42 CHI
- 08:23 CHI – Russ Michna 1 yd run (Todd France kick) – 62–42 CHI
- 04:27 DAL – Andrae Thurman 15 yd pass from Chris Sanders (Remy Hamilton kick) – 62–49 CHI
- 03:08 CHI – Donovan Morgan 32 yd pass from Sherdrick Bonner (Todd France kick) – 69–49 CHI
- 00:51 DAL – Marcus Nash 9 yd pass from Chris Sanders (Remy Hamilton kick) – 69–56 CHI
- 00:43 CHI – Jonathan Ordway 57 yd kickoff return (Todd France kick blocked) – 75–56 CHI
- 00:00 DAL – Chris Sanders 8 yd run (Remy Hamilton kick) – 75–63 CHI
- Officials: Tom McCabe; Umpire: Rich Podraza; Linesman: Rod Pearson; Line judge: Dana McKinzie; Back judge: Tony Lombardo
- Offensive Player of the Game: Donovan Morgan (CHI)
- Defensive Player of the Game: Liam Ezekial (CHI)
- Ironman Player of the Game: Dan Alexander (CHI)

== Playoffs ==
=== National Conference Wild Card: vs. (6) New York Dragons ===
Quarter	1	2	3	4	Total
(6) NY	14	21	14	28	77
(3) DAL	7	21	7	28	63

at American Airlines Center, Dallas, Texas

- Date: June 27
- Game time: 7:30 PM EST
- Game attendance: 10,076

Game information

1st Quarter:

- 08:10 DAL – PETTIS, Will 6 yd pass from DOLEZEL, Clint (HAMILTON, Remy kick) – 7–0 DAL
- 04:26 NY – MOSS, Terry 11 yd pass from GARCIA, Aaron (AZAR, Steve kick) – 7–7
- 00:43 NY – SWAYNE, Kevin 6 yd pass from GARCIA, Aaron (AZAR, Steve kick) – 14–7 NY

2nd Quarter:

- 11:33 DAL – ARMSTRONG, Anth 3 yd pass from DOLEZEL, Clint (HAMILTON, Remy kick) – 14–14
- 07:22 DAL – PETTIS, Will 3 yd run (HAMILTON, Remy kick) – 21–14 DAL
- 04:58 NY – SWAYNE, Kevin 12 yd pass from GARCIA, Aaron (AZAR, Steve kick) – 21–21
- 03:22 DAL – PETTIS, Will 5 yd pass from DOLEZEL, Clint (HAMILTON, Remy kick) – 28–21 DAL
- 01:02 NY – ANTHONY, Chris 6 yd pass from GARCIA, Aaron (AZAR, Steve kick) – 28–28
- 00:06 NY – MOSS, Terry 18 yd pass from GARCIA, Aaron (AZAR, Steve kick) – 35–28 NY

3rd Quarter:

- 11:40 DAL – WHITE, Josh 2 yd run (HAMILTON, Remy kick) – 35–35
- 06:21 NY – SWAYNE, Kevin 10 yd pass from GARCIA, Aaron (AZAR, Steve kick) – 42–35 NY
- 03:31 NY – MOSS, Terry 28 yd pass from GARCIA, Aaron (AZAR, Steve kick) – 49–35 NY

4th Quarter:

- 11:17 NY – SWAYNE, Kevin 14 yd pass from GARCIA, Aaron (AZAR, Steve kick) – 56–35 NY
- 09:29 DAL – ARMSTRONG, Anth 26 yd pass from DOLEZEL, Clint (HAMILTON, Remy kick) – 56–42 NY
- 07:34 NY – PRICE, Idris 7 yd run (AZAR, Steve kick) – 63–42 NY
- 04:29 DAL – THURMAN, Andrae 4 yd pass from DOLEZEL, Clint (HAMILTON, Remy kick) – 63–49 NY
- 03:29 NY – ANTHONY, Chris 24 yd pass from GARCIA, Aaron (AZAR, Steve kick) – 70–49 NY
- 01:10 DAL – PETTIS, Will 5 yd pass from DOLEZEL, Clint (HAMILTON, Remy kick) – 70–56 NY
- 00:52 NY – PRICE, Idris 12 yd run (AZAR, Steve kick) – 77–56 NY
- 00:24 DAL – THURMAN, Andrae 7 yd pass from DOLEZEL, Clint (HAMILTON, Remy kick) – 77–63 NY
- Officials: Referee: Riley Johnson; Umpire: Al Granado; Linesman: Julian Mapp; Line judge: David Meslow; Back judge: Rich Wilborn
- Offensive Player of the Game: Aaron Garcia (NY)
- Defensive Player of the Game: John Walker (NY)
- Ironman Player of the Game: Will Pettis (DAL)
