= Willis Marshall =

American gridiron football player (born 1975)

No. 3, 22
- Position: Wide receiver / Defensive back

Personal information
- Born: August 12, 1975 (age 51); Detroit, Michigan, U.S.
- Listed height: 5 ft 9 in (1.75 m)
- Listed weight: 197 lb (89 kg)

Career information
- College: Youngstown State
- NFL draft: 1998: undrafted

Career history
- Calgary Stampeders (1998–1999); Grand Rapids Rampage (2001–2002); Colorado Crush (2004–2006); Dallas Desperados (2007); Georgia Force (2008); Cleveland Gladiators (2008); Bossier-Shreveport Battle Wings (2010)

Awards and highlights
- Grey Cup champion (1998); 2× ArenaBowl champion (2001, 2005); ArenaBowl Offensive Player of the Game (2005); ArenaBowl Ironman of the Game (2005); ArenaBowl MVP (2005); Second-team All-Arena (2002); 2× AFL All-Ironman Team (2005, 2006); 2× Division I-AA national champion (1994, 1997)

Career AFL statistics
- Receptions: 646
- Receiving yards: 7,223
- Receiving touchdowns: 95
- Total tackles: 207
- Return yards: 6,709
- Stats at ArenaFan.com

Willis Thurman Marshall III (born August 12, 1975) is an American former professional football wide receiver / defensive back. He played college football at Youngstown State.

In his career, Marshall played for the Calgary Stampeders, Grand Rapids Rampage, Colorado Crush, Dallas Desperados, Georgia Force, Cleveland Gladiators, and Bossier-Shreveport Battle Wings. He won the 86th Grey Cup with the Stampeders in 1998.

== Early life ==
Marshall attended Brother Rice High School in Detroit where he competed in football, basketball and track. He was a member of the football team that won the state championship in 1990.

== College career ==
Marshall attended Youngstown State University, where he played for future Ohio State head coach, Jim Tressel, as well as lettered in football. Youngstown State won the NCAA Division I-AA national championship in 1993, 1994 and 1997.

As a freshman, Marshall recorded four tackles, one forced fumble and one fumble recovery as a Defensive back. As a sophomore, he switched from defensive back to wide receiver, and recorded 10 receptions for 97 yards. As a junior, he recorded 24 receptions for 305 yards and one touchdown as a junior. As a senior, he led the team in receiving with 40 receptions for 490 yards and one touchdown en route to the Penguins third Division I-AA Championship in four years. He finished his college career with 74 receptions for 892 yards. He also graduated with Bachelor's degree in Advertising and Communications.

== Professional career ==
=== Canadian Football League (1998–1999) ===
Marshall played the 1998 and 1999 seasons in the Canadian Football League with the Calgary Stampeders. The Stampeders won the 86th Grey Cup in 1998, with Jeff Garcia as their quarterback.

=== Arena Football League (2001–2010) ===
==== Grand Rapids Rampage (2001–2003) ====
In 2001, Marshall signed with the Grand Rapids Rampage of the Arena Football League. In seven games as a rookie, he recorded 35 receptions for 440 yards and five touchdowns. On defense, he recorded 14 tackles. In 2002, he was named Second Team All-Arena after leading the Rampage in receptions with 80, receiving yards with 973, kickoff return yards with 813 and all-purpose yards with 1,791 in addition to recording 15 receiving touchdowns in 14 games. He recorded a season-high 118 receiving yards on five receptions with one touchdown on the road against the Arizona Rattlers. In 2003, he recorded team highs in kickoff returns with 31 and kickoff return yards with 732, and ranked second on the team in all-purpose yards with 1,741. On offense, he recorded 75 receptions for 904 yards and 15 touchdowns in 16 games. He recorded a season-high 11 receptions for 98 yards with three touchdowns on the road against the Dallas Desperados.

==== Colorado Crush (2004–2006) ====
On November 11, 2003, Marshall signed with the Colorado Crush. For his first season with the Crush, he recorded 86 receptions for 854 receiving yards and 13 touchdowns in 16 games. He ranked second on the team in receptions and scoring among non-kickers with 120 points. He recorded one net recovery for a touchdown in his Crush debut against the Las Vegas Gladiators. He recorded a season-high 10 receptions for 93 yards on the road against the San Jose SaberCats.

In 2005, he recorded 79 receptions for 890 yards and 13 touchdowns in addition to recording five yards on 15 carries and six touchdowns on offense in 15 games. He also recorded 42 kickoff returns for 932 kickoff return yards, and 29.5 tackles, four passes defensed and one forced fumble on defense. For his performance that season he was named to the AFL's All-Ironman Team. He recorded 11 receptions for 109 yards and one touchdown in addition to two carries for two yards for two touchdowns on offense against the Nashville Kats, and was named Ironman of the Game. He was also named ArenaBowl MVP, after the Crush won ArenaBowl XIX over the Georgia Force, 51-48.

In 2006, he recorded career highs in receptions with 100, receiving yards with 992, rushing attempts with 22, rushing yards with 72, kickoff returns with 79 and kickoff return yards with 1,580 in 16 games. He ranked third in the league in all-purpose yards with 2,6674, which set a new franchise single-season record and was named to the AFL's All-Ironman Team for his performance.

He recorded seven receptions for 54 yards and two touchdowns on offense against the Chicago Rush in addition to recording 5.5 tackles on defense, he earned Ironman of the Game for his performance. He was named Offensive Player of the Game and Ironman of the Game against the Gladiators after recording 126 kickoff return yards on five attempts, and eight receptions for 80 yards and two touchdowns on offense. He recorded 275 all-purpose yards against the Rampage by recording 198 kickoff return yards on seven attempts and 77 receiving yards on four receptions and one touchdown. He was named Ironman of the Game for his performance.

==== Dallas Desperados (2007) ====
In 2007, Marshall signed with the Dallas Desperados. In his only season in Dallas, he finished third on the team in receiving with 66 receptions for 747 yards and 12 touchdowns in 16 games. He also recorded 29 kickoff returns for 485 yards. He also recorded 13.5 tackles and one interception on defense.

==== Georgia Force (2008) ====
On December 5, 2007, Marshall signed with the Georgia Force. During the 2008 season, he played in three games for the Force, and recorded two receptions for 19 yards, and 11 carries for 20 yards on offense. Along with two tackles on defense, and 21 kickoff returns for 354 yards. He was released by the Force on March 28.

==== Cleveland Gladiators (2008) ====
Marshall then signed with the Cleveland Gladiators. With the Gladiators, he recorded 61 receptions for 647 yards and three touchdowns, along with six carries for 21 yards and three touchdowns on offense. He also recorded nine tackles, and one pass broken up on defense. He also recorded 34 kickoff returns for 684 yards.

==== Bossier–Shreveport Battle Wings (2010) ====
Marshall played for the Bossier–Shreveport Battle Wings in 2010.

== Personal life ==
Marshall is cousins with former Dallas Cowboys and Georgia Force Fullback Robert Thomas. Marshall, also co-owns his own business, 4ward Motion, an event and party planning company in Detroit. Growing up his favorite players football players growing up were Walter Payton and Billy Sims. Marshall appeared in Disney's movie The Game Plan as a defensive back and running back.
