= Jermaine Jones (gridiron football) =

American gridiron football player (born 1976)

No. 7
- Position: Defensive specialist

Personal information
- Born: July 25, 1976 (age 50); Morgan City, Louisiana, U.S.
- Listed height: 5 ft 9 in (1.75 m)
- Listed weight: 187 lb (85 kg)

Career information
- High school: Central Catholic (Morgan City)
- College: Northwestern State
- NFL draft: 1999: 5th round, 162nd overall pick

Career history
- New York Jets (1999); Chicago Bears (1999); New York Giants (2000)*; Dallas Cowboys (2001)*; Dallas Cowboys (2002); Edmonton Eskimos (2002 – 2003); Cleveland Browns (2003)*; New York Giants (2004)*; Dallas Desperados (2002–2008)
- * Offseason or practice squad member only

Awards and highlights
- Southland Conference Defensive Player of the Year (1998); 2× All-Southland Conference (1997, 1998); Second-team All-Southland Conference (1996); Second-team All-Arena (2007)

Career AFL statistics
- Games played: 106
- Tackles: 448
- Interceptions: 29
- Yards: 363
- Touchdowns: 7
- Stats at ArenaFan.com
- Stats at Pro Football Reference

Jermaine Jones (born July 25, 1976) is an American former professional football defensive specialist in the Arena Football League (AFL) for the Dallas Desperados. He also was a member of the New York Jets, Chicago Bears, New York Giants, and Dallas Cowboys in the National Football League (NFL); and the Edmonton Eskimos in the Canadian Football League (CFL). He played college football at Northwestern State University.

== Early life ==
Jones attended at Central Catholic High School. As a senior, he received All-State and district offensive MVP honors. He was also a two-time All-District selection during his four-year basketball career.

== College career ==
Jones accepted a football scholarship from Northwestern State University, but was a walk-on with the basketball team.

As a redshirt freshman, he appeared in every game as a reserve wide receiver, catching 5 passes for 114 yards. As a sophomore, he was switched to cornerback and earned the starter job, making 40 tackles, 8 passes defensed and 2 interceptions, while receiving second-team All-Southland Conference honors.

As a junior, he collected 37 tackles, 5 interceptions, 2 sacks, 16 passes defensed and one fumble recovery, receiving All-Southland Conference honors.

As a senior, he recorded 52 tackles, 21 passes defensed (school record) and set a school record 6 interceptions for 232 return yards and 2 touchdowns. He also contributed 18 kickoff returns for 406 yards (22.6-yard average). Jones earned All-Southland Conference honors, was the league's defensive player of the year and was a finalist for the Buck Buchanan Award, given to the top defensive player in the NCAA Division I-AA. His 44 career passes defensed set a school and conference record.

In 2013, he was selected to the Southland Conference's All-Time Football Team.

== Professional career ==
=== National Football League (1999–2000) ===
Jones was selected by the New York Jets in the fifth round (162nd overall) of the 1999 NFL draft. He appeared in one game before being released on September 5. On September 7, he was signed to the Jets' practice squad. He was released on September 14 to make room for cornerback Corey Sawyer.

On September 21, he was signed to the Chicago Bears' practice squad. He was promoted to the Bears active roster on December 1, but did not play in the final four games. In July 2000, he was released by the Bears.

On July 25, he signed with the New York Giants. He was released by the Giants four days later on July 29 and spent the season out of football. On January 31, 2001, Jones was signed by the Dallas Cowboys, and recorded 12 tackles, two passes defensed and a fumble recovery during the preseason. He was released on September 2, 2001.

=== Canadian Football League (2001) ===
On September 14, 2001, Jones signed with the Edmonton Eskimos of the Canadian Football League, after his release from the Cowboys. He played in eight regular season games, recording 22 tackles, 5 passes defensed, one interception and 2 fumble recoveries, including one returned for a 79-yard touchdown. He posted another 4 tackles in Edmonton's only playoff game.

=== Return to National Football League (2002) ===
In 2002, Jones returned to training camp with the Eskimos but was released at the end of camp. He signed with the Dallas Desperados on December 9, before signing with the Dallas Cowboys on December 11. Jones played on special teams against the Philadelphia Eagles but recorded no stats. On July 29, 2003, he was signed as a free agent by the Cleveland Browns. He was released on August 26.

=== Arena Football League (2003–2009) ===
On December 10, 2002, he was signed by the Dallas Desperados of the Arena Football League, who were owned by Jerry Jones, who also owned the Dallas Cowboys. He made his debut in 2003, despite missing the first quarter of the season, he put together a record-setting performance in his first indoor campaign, earning All-Rookie honors after finishing the regular season with team records for tackles (73.5) and passes defensed (18). His 73.5 tackles ranked ninth in the league, while his 18 pass deflections was tied for 12th. Jones was placed on the Desperados Reserve/Exempt list December 11, after signing with the Cowboys. He was activated from Reserve/Exempt list on February 28 and made his Arena Football League debut two days later at the Arizona Rattlers.

In 2004, Jones was leading or tied for the team lead in tackles nine times while finishing with a franchise record 74.5 tackles. He also recorded 14 passes defensed (tied for fifth in the league) and intercepted four (tied for eighth in the league). In 2005, his third season in Dallas, Jones again proved his ability as he led the team in tackles for the third consecutive season (66.5) while also leading the team and finishing fifth in the league with six interceptions. His 126 interception return yards led the league while his three returns for touchdowns tied for the league lead and were a single-season career high.

In 2006, Jones led the Desperados in tackles for the fourth consecutive season, posting a career-high and team record 99.5 tackles. He also finished fourth in the league in tackles. Jones recorded eight interceptions on the season, returning one for a touchdown, setting a franchise record for interceptions in a season. In 2007, Jones finished with a team-best 87.5 tackles and seven interceptions with two interceptions returned for touchdowns to garner AFL All-Arena Second-team honors. In 2008, Jones played in 14 games and recorded 56 total tackles, three interceptions for 30 yards and 12 passes broken up. He was waived on January 30, 2008.

=== Career statistics ===
	Career Defensive Statistics											
Year	Team	G	Tack	Solo	Ast	sack	FF	FR	Int	Yds	TD	Pass Def.
2003	Dallas Desperados	13	68	57	11	0	0	0	1	45	1	18
2004	Dallas Desperados	16	70	60	10	0	1	3	4	7	0	13
2005	Dallas Desperados	15	63	56	7	0	2	0	6	126	3	17
2006	Dallas Desperados	18	98	95	3	0	1	2	8	84	1	15
2007	Dallas Desperados	17	82	71	11	0	0	0	7	71	2	22
2008	Dallas Desperados	14	56	42	9	0	0	0	3	30	0	12
Total		106	448	379	53	0	4	5	29	363	7	97

== Personal life ==
During the offseason, Jones ran a training clinic in Louisiana and worked with high school and college athletes to improve their strength, endurance and speed. Jones has participated in The Salvation Army’s Angel Tree program, providing less fortunate children with clothes and toys for Christmas. Jones has one child, a daughter, Amber born November 12, 2004.

== See also ==
- List of Arena Football League and National Football League players
