= Duke Pettijohn =

American football player (born 1977)

No. 45
- Position: Defensive lineman

Personal information
- Born: June 7, 1977 (age 49); Poughkeepsie, New York
- Listed height: 6 ft 2 in (1.88 m)
- Listed weight: 255 lb (116 kg)

Career information
- College: Syracuse
- NFL draft: 2001: undrafted

Career history
- Cincinnati Bengals (2001)*; Jacksonville Jaguars (2002)*; Orlando Predators (2002–2003); Dallas Desperados (2004–2008); Dallas Vigilantes (2010); San Antonio Talons (2012)*; San Jose SaberCats (2013)*
- * Offseason or practice squad member only

Awards and highlights
- 2× All-Big East (1999, 2000); 4× Ironman of the Game winner; 3× All-Ironman team selection; 2× First Team All-Arena (2006, 2007); Second Team All-Arena (2008)

Career AFL statistics
- Tackles: 262
- Sacks: 21.5
- Stats at ArenaFan.com

Maynard C. "Duke" Pettijohn (born June 7, 1977) is a former American Arena football defensive lineman. He was signed by the Cincinnati Bengals as an undrafted free agent in 2001. He played college football at Syracuse and was a two-time member of the All-Big East team.

== Early life ==
Pettijohn attended West Roxbury High School in West Roxbury, Massachusetts, where he lettered three times in basketball, and four times in football. As a senior linebacker, he was the Team MVP, an All-City, All-League, and All-State selection, as well as the league MVP, and a Consensus Player of the Year.

== College career ==
In 1997, as a freshman, Pettijohn saw playing time in nine games as a reserve linebacker, totaling six tackles. As a sophomore, in 1998, Pettijohn made the switch from linebacker to defensive end and registered 39 tackles, 6.5 sacks and six quarterback pressures. In 1999, as a junior, he earned All-Big East honors after recording 45 tackles, including a team-high 13 tackles for a loss, 10.5 sacks and nine quarterback pressures. In 2000, as a senior, Pettijohn posted 47 tackles, 14 tackles for losses, 12 quarterback pressures, 7.5 sacks, two passes defensed and a fumble recovery to earn second-team All-Big East honors at defensive end. At the end of this career Pettijohn finished second on the Orange (then Orangemen)'s all-time sack list with 24.5. While at Syracuse he majored in child and family studies.

== Professional career ==
=== National Football League ===
In 2001, Pettijohn went unselected in the 2001 NFL draft. He later signed with the Cincinnati Bengals as a rookie free agent, but was released prior to the start of training camp. In 2002, Pettijohn signed to the Jacksonville Jaguars practice squad on October 16 and, except for one week in November, remained there for the rest of the season.

=== Arena Football League ===
In 2002, Pettijohn signed with the Orlando Predators of the Arena Football League. He finished his rookie season with 42 carries for 84 yards and seven touchdowns, nine receptions for 122 yards and three touchdowns and 23 tackles, one tackle for a loss, one sack and a pass defensed.

In his first AFL game, the Predators played the Chicago Rush and Pettijohn recorded 13 yards on seven carries, two tackles and a forced fumble. The following week against the New Jersey Red Dogs, he recorded three tackles, three rushing yards and one touchdown. At the Grand Rapids Rampage, he posted two tackles, a quarterback pressure, four carries for three yards and two touchdowns. Against the San Jose SaberCats, Pettijohn recorded 2.5 tackles and a 20-yard touchdown reception. On the road against the Indiana Firebirds, he recorded 2.5 tackles, two receptions for 13 yards and a team-high 13 rushing yards. Against the Carolina Cobras, Pettijohn earned Ironman of the Game honors after recording 2.5 tackles, a sack, a forced fumble, and two carries. Against the Tampa Bay Storm, Pettijohn continued his strong rookie campaign by recording two receptions for 32 yards, a tackle, two quarterback pressures, seven rushing yards and two rushing touchdowns. During a road game against the New York Dragons, he carried the ball seven times for 12 yards and a touchdown, while adding on a 16-yard touchdown reception and a tackle. Against the Toronto Phantoms, Pettijohn recorded two tackles. He then scored on a 10-yard reception the next week at the Cobras. On the road against the Storm, he earned Ironman of the Game honors after rushing seven times for 30 yards, adding one reception for 24 yards and recording four tackles. Against the Georgia Force, Pettijohn led the team with nine rushing yards on two carries while adding a seven-yard reception and one tackle. In the regular season finale one the road against the Dallas Desperados, he recorded one tackle and a tackle for a loss.

In Orlando's first round playoff victory over the Buffalo Destroyers, he recorded two tackles, a pass defensed, a quarterback pressure and two carries for three yards. During the second round win over Red Dogs in a quarterfinals, he rushed four times for eight yards and a touchdown while catching a 10-yard pass and adding 1.5 tackles and a pass deflection on defense. In the Predator's semifinal round loss on the road to the SaberCats, Pettijohn recorded 4.5 tackles, a fumble recovery and a pass defensed.

In 2003, after missing the first three games of the season while on the Predators' Reserve/Exempt list, Pettijohn returned to the AFL in a road game against the Cobras, rushing three times for 15 yards and a touchdown, while also recording a quarterback pressure. On the road at the Dragons he registered a 12-yard carry, a seven-yard reception, a half tackle and a fumble recovery. The next week against the Firebirds, he recorded a tackle and a fumble recovery, while rushing the ball once. In Tampa Bay, Pettijohn recorded four tackles. He recorded 3.5 tackles and a pass deflection against the Force. Against the Los Angeles Avengers, he rushed the ball twice for 29 yards, including a 25-yard touchdown run, caught a six-yard pass and totaled 1.5 tackles. He recorded three tackles, including one for a loss, on the road against the Arizona Rattlers, then he led the Predators with 16 rushing yards and a touchdown on five carries against the Destroyers. Pettijohn recorded 5.5 tackles and a tackle for a loss against the Las Vegas Gladiators, while also carrying the ball twice for nine yards and a touchdown and catching an 11-yard pass. He recorded three tackles one the road against the Force before recording a tackle and 15 rushing yards on two carries, including the game-winning touchdown in overtime, on the road against the Colorado Crush. Pettijohn rushed the ball twice for 11 yards and two touchdowns against the Cobras while recording an eight-yard reception and two tackles, a tackle for a loss and a forced fumble. He finished the regular season with 2.5 tackles and two pass deflections at the Detroit Fury.

After a first round bye, Pettijohn started the playoffs by carrying the ball for three yards and a touchdown on seven carries while recording two tackles in the quarterfinals against the Dragons. The following week at the Storm in a semifinal loss, he recorded a team-high five tackles and a sack while rushing for four yards and a touchdown on three carries.

In 2004, Pettijohn signed with the Dallas Desperados on October 16, 2003. He finished the season with then career-highs in tackles (44.0) and sacks (2.5), and two fumble recoveries. He also recorded 66 rushing yards on eight carries.

In his Dallas debut against the Cobras, Pettijohn recorded three tackles and a six-yard carry. Against the Philadelphia Soul he recorded a career-high seven tackles, he also carried the ball five times for nine yards and two touchdowns. Later, he caught two passes for 13 yards, and recorded 1.5 tackles at the Dragons. He was on the Inactive/Injured list for the game in Columbus, but returned to play against the Rampage and recorded 1.5 tackles, a half sack and a half tackle for a loss. Pettijohn was then inactive with a sprained left ankle at the Cobras and against the Avengers. He returned at the Soul and led the team in rushing yards, with 12 on two carries, and tackles, with four, also recording 15 yards on two receptions and a fumble recovery. Against the SaberCats he was named the ADT Defensive Player of the Game after recording two tackles, a sack and forcing a third quarter fumble. While on the road in Arizona, Pettijohn led the team in tackles with six, while catching a 15-yard pass, and recorded a four-yard rushing touchdown. Against the Orlando Predators, Pettijohn recorded five tackles and a quarterback pressure, one carry for six yards and a seven-yard catch. Against the Dragons he recorded three tackles, three carries for three yards. During a game in Austin, Pettijohn tied for second on the team with four tackles, broke up two pass attempts, added a half sack and half a tackle for a loss, two rushes for three yards, and two receptions for 16 yards. At the Chicago Rush he carried the ball once for nine yards, and recorded 1.5 tackles. Against the Destroyers, Pettijohn carried the ball two times for 20 yards, including a season-long 20-yard touchdown run, and recorded a half a tackle, half a tackle for a loss and half a sack. In the season finale against the Storm, he tied for second on the team with five tackles and recovered a fumble that he returned for a touchdown to begin the second half.

In 2005, Pettijohn had his most productive season of his career, finishing with career-highs in carries (57), rushing yards (212), touchdowns (eight), tackles (45.0), sacks (5.5), tackles for losses (6.5) and fumble recoveries (three). He was named to the All-Ironman team after setting single-season franchise records for rushes and rushing yards. He holds the team's all-time longest rush, a 37-yard touchdown, and moved into second place in team history with 286 rushing yards. He led the team and doubled his previous season high with 5.0 sacks and also doubled his all-time career totals in tackles for losses with 6.5.

In the season opening overtime win against the Rush, Pettijohn rushed for eight yards and a touchdown, which turned out to be the eventual game-winning touchdown, on four carries while recording two tackles. At the Dragons, he assisted on two tackles and carried the ball six times for 28 yards. Against the Destroyers, he recorded two tackles, a quarterback pressure and a fumble recovery, and five carries for 13 yards and a touchdown. Against the Predators, Pettijohn earned Defensive Player of the Game honors, leading the team with six tackles, a sack, a quarterback pressure and a fumble recovery that led to an eventual touchdown and a two-score Dallas lead. At the Soul, he was named Ironman of the Game, carrying the ball three times for 47 yards, including a club-record 37-yard touchdown run, finishing second on the team with three tackles and recovering his third fumble of the season. Against the New Orleans VooDoo, he finished second on the team with five tackles, including a sack that resulted in a safety. At the Wranglers, Pettijohn finished with 3.5 tackles, a hurry, three carries for five yards and blocked a second quarter field goal attempt that led to a Dallas touchdown. At the Avengers he led the team with six carries for nine yards and a touchdown. Against the Crush, he added two tackles and a blocked PAT attempt. Against the Nashville Kats, Pettijohn added two tackles and 22 rushing yards on four carries. In San Jose, he added two tackles, both sacks, one for a safety, and a catch for 10 yards. At the Destroyers he led the team with six carries for 18 yards and two rushing touchdowns while posting two tackles and a sack. At the Force, Pettijohn finished second with 6.5 tackles and added four carries for 26 yards and a rushing touchdown. In the season finale against the Philadelphia Soul, he had four carries for 12 yards and a touchdown and added three tackles.

Pettijohn represented the Desperados at the 2005 ArenaBattle event during ArenaBowl XIX weekend as one of the top FB/LBs in the league.

In 2006, Pettijohn continued as a veteran leader on offense and defense for the Desperados rushing 37 times for 83 yards and two touchdowns while finishing fourth on the team with 42.0 tackles, second in sacks (three), tackles for losses (six) and tying for the team lead with four forced fumbles. He led the team with 13.5 special teams tackles.

In the Desperados' season opener against the Kansas City Brigade, Pettijohn recorded three tackles and a pass breakup, five rushes for eight yards and a score. He picked up 3.5 tackles on defense and helped the offense record 343 yards through the air, the fourth best passing day in team history. Against the Wranglers, he carried the ball twice for one yard and a touchdown while adding three tackles, including one for a loss, the 150th tackle of his career. Against the Gladiators, he caught one pass for a season-long 21 yards and added two carries for three yards. At the Chicago Rush, Pettijohn carried the ball four times for a season-high 21 yards while adding a tackle on defense and recovering a Matt D'Orazio fumble in the endzone. The next week at the Storm, he earned Ironman of the Game honors after leading the team with seven tackles, including a sack and two forced fumbles. At the Predators, Pettijohn rushed four times for 10 yards and helped the offense record a season-high 377 yards of total offense, the third best day in club history, along with two tackles. Against the Soul, he had two tackles and two pass breakups. Against the Destroyers, Pettjohn earned Defensive Player of the Game honors with two tackles, including his second sack of the season. At the Dragons, he recorded two tackles, including a sack that resulted in an intentional grounding penalty in the endzone for a safety, and two runs for 10 yards. Against the Rampage, he earned Defensive Player of the Game for the second time on the season with five tackles, one for a loss and a pass breakup, he also rushed the ball four times for 12 yards and caught two passes for 18 yards. At the Force, Pettijohn added four tackles and one for a loss. Against the Rattlers, he recorded 2.5 tackles and a fumble recovery. Against the Dragons, he carried the ball twice for three yards, caught a three-yard pass for a touchdown and recorded a tackle and forced a fumble.

In the Divisional Championship game against the Force, Pettijohn rushed the ball three times for six yards and recorded a half tackle. In the Conference Championship game against the Predators, he added two carries for one yard and a touchdown, a tackle and pass deflection.

In 2007, Pettijohn finished with 43.5 tackles (35 solo) and led the team in special teams tackles with 16.5 while also tallying the second-most sacks (6.0) and tackles for loss (7.0). For this he was named to the AFL All-Arena First-team for the second consecutive season and the All-Ironman team for the third consecutive time.

In the season opener in New York, Pettijohn recorded three tackles and a half sack. Against the Storm he was named the Defensive Player of the Game against after recording five tackles and one pass defensed. He recorded his first rushing attempt of the season for a loss of one yard at the Brigade while also recording two tackles. Against the Wranglers, Pettijohn recorded two tackles, one sack, a forced fumble and a fumble recovery. Against the Destroyers, he earned his second Defensive Player of the Game honor of the season, after recording two tackles, one quarterback pressure, one pass defensed and one forced fumble. Against the Philadelphia Soul, he had 1.5 tackles, two passes defensed and one fumble recovery to earn his third Defensive Player of the Game honor of the season. Against the Kats, Pettijohn finished second on the team in tackles with five including making the 200th tackle of his career, while also adding a sack, one hurry and a pass breakup. At the Utah Blaze he recorded two tackles, one sack and one fumble recovery. Against the Rush, Pettijohn had 2.5 tackles, one tackle for a loss and forced a fumble. In Columbus, he recorded four tackles, one tackle for loss and forced a fumble. At the Soul, Pettijohn was named Defensive Player of the Game for the fourth time this season after recording five tackles. Against the VooDoo, he recorded one sack along with two tackles. Against the Dragons, Pettijohn recorded two tackles, 1.5 sacks, one tackle for loss, three hurries, one blocked PAT and forced a fumble, in a game where the defense forced five turnovers and gave up the lowest yardage total (138) and second-lowest point total (13) in franchise history.

==== 2007 playoffs ====
In the Divisional Championship game against the Destroyers, Pettijohn made 1.5 tackles and one sack.

In 2008, Pettijohn recorded 0 tackles (0solo), 0sacks, one pass defensed, two fumbles recovered, and one kick return for 18 yards. On the 2008 season, he had no rushing yards, nor any receptions.

=== Arena Football 1 ===
==== 2009 ====
Pettijohn signed with the Vigilantes in Arena Football 1 on January 2, 2009.

== Personal ==
Pettijohn is married to wife Juliet, and the couple have two sons and a daughter, including Ohio State linebacker Riley Pettijohn.

Pettijohn is involved in the Desperados' Impact Player Program, an annual outreach initiative that provides positive role models to at-risk youth served by the Boys & Girls Clubs system.

Currently, Pettijohn is the defensive ends coach for the Parish Episcopal School Panthers.

== See also ==
- List of Arena Football League and National Football League players
