= Will Pettis =

American football player (born 1977)

No. 3
- Position: Wide receiver / defensive back

Personal information
- Born: December 11, 1977 (age 48); Hinesville, Georgia, U.S.
- Listed height: 6 ft 0 in (1.83 m)
- Listed weight: 200 lb (91 kg)

Career information
- High school: Hinesville (GA) Bradwell Institute
- College: Midwestern State
- NFL draft: 2001: undrafted

Career history
- Pensacola Barracudas (2002); Dallas Desperados (2003 – 2008); New Orleans Saints (2003)*; Atlanta Falcons (2005)*; Texas Hurricanes (2009); Dallas Vigilantes (2010)
- * Offseason or practice squad member only

Awards and highlights
- AFL All-rookie (2003); 2× Ironman of the Year (2007, 2008); 5× All-Ironman Team (2004,2005, 2006, 2007, 2008); 3× Second-Team All-Arena (2003, 2004, 2005)

Career AFL statistics
- Receptions: 572
- Receiving yards: 6,567
- Receiving touchdowns: 143
- Total tackles: 246
- Interceptions: 22
- Stats at ArenaFan.com

Will Pettis (born December 11, 1977) is a former wide receiver and defensive back in the Arena Football League (AFL) for the Dallas Desperados and Dallas Vigilantes. He was a four-time member of the AFL's All-Ironman team, a three-time member of the All-Arena team and the 2007 Ironman of the Year. He played college football at Midwestern State University.

== Early life ==
Pettis attended Bradwell Institute in Hinesville Georgia to finish his prep career. As a junior, he posted 49 tackles and 3 interceptions.

He enrolled at Middle Georgia Junior College. He was named to the GJCAA Region 17 All-District team, after totaling 54 tackles and 3 broken passes, for a defense that established a NJCAA record for fewest yards surrendered in a season.

Pettis transferred to the University of Houston after his sophomore season. As a junior, he was named a starting cornerback. In August 2000, he was dismissed from the football team for violating team rules.

In 2000, he transferred to Midwestern State University. As a senior, he posted 42 tackles, 3 interceptions, 13 passes deflected and 10 punt returns for 151 yards. He set a school record with 4 passes deflected against West Texas A&M University. He also finished second in the Lone Star Conference with a team-leading 14.6 yard punt return average, 146 yards on 10 returns.

== Professional career ==
=== Pensacola Barracudas (af2) ===
In 2001, Pettis was out of football. In 2002, he joined the Pensacola Barracudas of af2 and finished the year second on the team with 55 receptions for 791 yards and 14 touchdowns. On defense, he led the team with nine interceptions for 47 yards, 34 pass breakups and eight missed field goal returns for 168 yards and a touchdown. He was third on the team with 36.5 tackles, including two for losses.

In 2009, he was named the af2 top ironman of All-time.

=== Dallas Desperados (AFL) ===
In 2003, Pettis made his Arena Football League debut with the Dallas Desperados and had one of the league’s best seasons by a rookie, earning All-Rookie and Second-Team All-Arena honors. He finished the season with a rookie club-record 1,562 all-purpose yards, 798 receiving, 640 on kickoff returns, 93 on missed field goal returns, 22 on interception returns and nine rushing, while finishing fourth on the team with 34.5 tackles.

On June 10, 2003, he was signed as a free agent by the Dallas Cowboys of the National Football League who were owned by Jerry Jones, who also owned the Dallas Desperados. The NFL rules that applied to teams that owned AFL franchises, forced them to keep players on the waiver wire for 10 calendar days, giving other NFL teams an opportunity to claim their rights and discourage the set up of alternative farm systems. On June 20, the New Orleans Saints claimed Pettis on the last possible day. He was released midway through their training camp.

In 2004, Pettis finished the season second on the team in receptions with 95, third in receiving yards with 1,076 and touchdowns with 20.

In 2005, Pettis ended the season with several milestones. In addition to being named to the All-Ironman Team and All-Arena Team for the third time, he moved into second place in franchise history in touchdown catches (50), career receptions (253) and receiving yards (2,860). On defense, he set a personal best with 47.5 tackles and five interceptions. He recorded five games with over 200 all-purpose yards, giving him 12 for his career. He also moved into second place in franchise record books with 426 career points and 70 career touchdowns. In 2005, he went to training camp with the Atlanta Falcons and was released on September 3.

In 2006, Pettis was named to the All-Arena team for the third time in his career after he recorded 1,256 receiving yards and 26 touchdowns on 93 receptions. His totals for the season helped him to become the all-time leader in all franchise receiving categories and to surpass 9,000 career all-purpose yards. He added 40 tackles, 13 passes defensed and six interceptions, bringing his career total to 15, good for second in team history, on defense.

In 2007, Pettis earned Ironman of the Year honors, as well as earning his fourth-straight All-Ironman selection as he was named Ironman of the Game 15 times and was named Ironman of the Month for March and June. He ranked second in all-purpose yards (2,781), tied for second in kickoff returns for a touchdown (four), sixth in catches (130), eighth in kickoff return average (21.2) and 10th in receiving yards (1,471).

In 2008, Pettis recorded 95 receptions for 1,048 yards and 25 touchdowns. On defense, he recorded 21 tackles, two interceptions and one touchdown.

=== Dallas Vigilantes (AFL) ===
In 2009, Pettis signed with the Texas Hurricanes, of the Southern Indoor Football League, making his debut on July 5. On June 2, 2010, Pettis returned to Dallas, signing with the Dallas Vigilantes of the Arena Football League.

In 2015, he was inducted into the Arena Football Hall of Fame.

=== Career statistics ===
Career Statistics			Receiving			
Year	Team	G	Rec	Yards	Y/R	TD
2003	Dallas Desperados	11	70	800	11.4	17
2004	Dallas Desperados	14	86	972	11.0	20
2005	Dallas Desperados	14	94	1,009	10.7	15
2006	Dallas Desperados	17	93	1,256	13.5	26
2007	Dallas Desperados	17	128	1,441	11.3	39
2008	Dallas Desperados	14	95	1,048	11.0	25
2010	Dallas Vigilantes	2	6	41	6.8	0
Total		79	572	6,567	10.2	143

	Career Defensive Statistics											
Year	Team	G	Tack	Solo	Ast	Sack	FF	FR	Int	Yds	TD	Pass Def.
2003	Dallas Desperados	11	34	33	1	0	0	0	3	22	0	4
2004	Dallas Desperados	14	32	27	5	0	0	0	1	20	0	8
2005	Dallas Desperados	14	43	39	4	0	0	2	5	64	0	6
2006	Dallas Desperados	17	37	31	6	0	1	0	6	59	0	7
2007	Dallas Desperados	17	56	49	7	0	1	1	3	1	0	0
2008	Dallas Desperados	14	21	10	1	0	0	0	2	71	1	1
Total		77	223	187	23	0	2	3	21	237	1	0

Career Statistics			Return Statistics			
Year	Team	G	Ret	Yards	Y/R	TD
2003	Dallas Desperados	11	37	750	20.3	0
2004	Dallas Desperados	14	94	1,871	19.9	4
2005	Dallas Desperados	14	83	1,657	20.0	7
2006	Dallas Desperados	17	67	1,153	17.2	0
2007	Dallas Desperados	17	57	1,251	22.0	4
2008	Dallas Desperados	14	49	820	16.7	0
Total		77	378	7,335	19.4	15

== Personal life ==
Pettis lives with his wife, Akiah, and their children, Heaven Leigh, Gabriella, and William. Since the suspension of the Arena Football League's 2009 season, he opened a personal training business and began to help mentor young athletes. He also started a career in the tele-media industry.

=== Charitable work ===
Since starting his career in Dallas, Pettis has become a visible face in the Dallas-Fort Worth community. He is an annual supporter of the Boys & Girls Clubs of Greater Dallas through the Desperados Impact Player Program. Several times a season, Pettis can be found playing basketball, video games or pool with at-risk youth served by the clubs across the Metroplex.

Pettis has twice served as a celebrity guest coach at the Dallas Cowboys Let Us Play! Sports Camp for Girls - a three-day sports camp for inner-city girls served by charitable organizations like The Salvation Army, West Dallas Community Centers and Girls, Inc. of Metropolitan Dallas. During the holiday season, Pettis participates in The Salvation Army Angel Tree program, where he adopts ‘angels’ which represent underprivileged children and purchases gifts for them during the holidays. Pettis signed autographs at the American Cancer Society’s Smoke Out event.

== See also ==
- List of National Football League and Arena football players
