= Andrae Thurman =

American football player (born 1980)

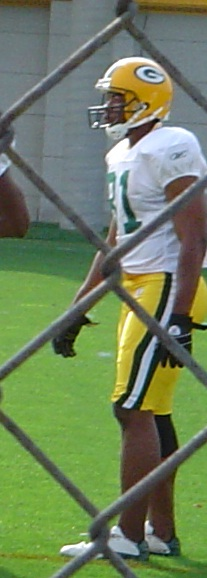
- Thurman with the Green Bay Packers in 2004

No. 81, 18
- Position: Wide receiver

Personal information
- Born: October 25, 1980 (age 46); Houston, Texas, U.S.
- Listed height: 5 ft 11 in (1.80 m)
- Listed weight: 190 lb (86 kg)

Career information
- High school: Westview (Avondale, Arizona)
- College: Arizona (2000–2002); Southern Oregon (2003)
- NFL draft: 2004: undrafted

Career history
- New York Giants (2004)*; Houston Texans (2004)*; Pittsburgh Steelers (2004)*; Green Bay Packers (2004); Tennessee Titans (2005); Green Bay Packers (2005); Winnipeg Blue Bombers (2006); Dallas Desperados (2007–2008); Las Vegas Locomotives (2009–2012); Arizona Rattlers (2011–2012); Milwaukee Mustangs (2012); Philadelphia Soul (2013); Portland Thunder (2014)*; Jacksonville Sharks (2014); Cleveland Gladiators (2015)
- * Offseason or practice squad member only

Awards and highlights
- 2× UFL champion (2009, 2010); UFL all-time leading receiver

Career NFL statistics
- Receptions: 9
- Receiving yards: 104
- Return yards: 268
- Stats at Pro Football Reference

Career CFL statistics
- Receptions: 40
- Receiving yards: 426
- Receiving touchdowns: 1
- Stats at CFL.ca (archived)

Career AFL statistics
- Receptions: 288
- Receiving yards: 3,483
- Receiving touchdowns: 69
- Stats at ArenaFan.com

D'Andrae Carnell Thurman (born October 25, 1980) is an American former professional football player who was a wide receiver in the National Football League (NFL) and Canadian Football League (CFL). He was signed by the NFL's New York Giants as an undrafted free agent in 2004. He played college football for the Southern Oregon Raiders.

Thurman was also a member of the Houston Texans, Pittsburgh Steelers, Green Bay Packers, Tennessee Titans, Winnipeg Blue Bombers, Dallas Desperados, Las Vegas Locomotives, Arizona Rattlers, Milwaukee Mustangs, Philadelphia Soul, Portland Thunder, Jacksonville Sharks, and Cleveland Gladiators.

== College career ==
Thurman played college football for the Arizona Wildcats and Southern Oregon University Raiders. During his time, he had 105 receptions, 1,530 receiving yards and 4 receiving touchdowns along with a kickoff return touchdown.

== Professional career ==
=== New York Giants ===
On May 7, 2004, Thurman was signed by the New York Giants of the National Football League as an undrafted free agent. On June 26, he was released by New York.

=== Houston Texans ===
On July 2, 2004, Thurman signed with the Houston Texans. On August 30, Thurman was released by the Texans as a part of the team's final roster cuts.

=== Pittsburgh Steelers ===
On September 7, 2004, Thurman signed with the Pittsburgh Steelers to join their practice squad.

=== Green Bay Packers ===
On September 8, 2004, Thurman signed with the Green Bay Packers. He played in two games for Green Bay and recorded two receptions for 12 yards.

=== Tennessee Titans ===
On September 4, 2005, Thurman was signed to the practice squad of the Tennessee Titans. He appeared in five games, returning nine punts for 31 yards along with two kickoff returns for 42 yards. On October 25, Thurman was released by Tennessee after violating team rules.

=== Green Bay Packers (second stint) ===
On October 25, 2005, Thurman signed with the Packers. He appeared in 10 games (including one start), and recorded seven receptions for 92 yards.

=== Winnipeg Blue Bombers ===
On May 18, 2006, Thurman signed with the Winnipeg Blue Bombers of the Canadian Football League. He recorded 40 receptions for 426 yards and one touchdown.

=== Dallas Desperados ===
In 2007, Thurman signed with the Dallas Desperados of the Arena Football League. He played for Dallas for two seasons, where recorded 65 receptions for 839 yards and 19 touchdowns.

=== Las Vegas Locomotives ===
In 2009, Thurman signed with the Las Vegas Locomotives of the United Football League. In three seasons, he recorded 57 receptions for 796 yards and one touchdown. He is currently the UFL's All-Time leading in receptions and receiving yards.

=== Arizona Rattlers ===
Thurman signed with the Arizona Rattlers of the Arena Football League.

=== Milwaukee Mustangs ===
Thurman signed with Milwaukee Mustangs of the Arena Football League.

=== Philadelphia Soul ===
Thurman would next sign with the Philadelphia Soul and played in ArenaBowl XXVI.

=== Portland Thunder ===
On February 19, 2014, Thurman was traded to the Portland Thunder for future considerations, but was later released by the team.

=== Jacksonville Sharks ===
On April 16, 2014, Thurman was assigned to the Jacksonville Sharks. He was placed on reassignment on April 24.

=== Cleveland Gladiators ===
On October 9, 2014, Thurman was assigned to the Cleveland Gladiators. On June 23, 2015, Thurman was placed on reassignment.
