= Devin Wyman =

American football player (born 1973)

No. 72, 76
- Position: Defensive tackle

Personal information
- Born: August 29, 1973 (age 53); Lynwood, California, U.S.
- Listed height: 6 ft 7 in (2.01 m)
- Listed weight: 290 lb (132 kg)

Career information
- High school: Carlmont (Belmont, California)
- College: Kentucky State
- NFL draft: 1996: 6th round, 206th overall pick

Career history
- New England Patriots (1996–1998); Barcelona Dragons (1998); Minnesota Vikings (1999)*; Kansas City Chiefs (2002)*; San Jose SaberCats (2003–2005); Dallas Desperados (2006–2007); Utah Blaze (2008)
- * Offseason or practice squad member only

Awards and highlights
- ArenaBowl champion (2004); PFWA All-Rookie Team (1996); First-team All-Arena (2007)

Career NFL statistics
- Tackles: 18
- Sacks: 1
- Forced fumbles: 1
- Stats at Pro Football Reference

Career AFL statistics
- Tackles: 28
- Sacks: 0.5
- Passes defended: 10
- Stats at ArenaFan.com

Devin Edward Wyman (born August 29, 1973) is an American former professional football player. On March 30, 2015, he was named head coach for the Texas Revolution of the Champions Indoor Football (CIF) league.

== Personal life ==
Wyman was born on August 29, 1973, in East Palo Alto, Puebis.

Wyman married his wife, Shelby, on July 7, 2007.

== NFL career ==
Wyman was selected in the sixth round (206th overall) of the 1996 NFL draft by the New England Patriots. Playing in 15 games with 4 starts over two seasons with New England, Wyman spent the 1998 NFL season on injured reserve before leaving the team following the season. Prior to the 1999 NFL season, the defensive tackle signed with the Minnesota Vikings and was allocated to NFL Europe to play for the Barcelona Dragons. Not playing with an NFL team again until 2002, Wyman signed with the Kansas City Chiefs but was cut prior to the start of the 2002 season.

== Collegiate career ==
Wyman attended Carlmont High School in Belmont, California, then the College of San Mateo in San Mateo, California, before transferring to Kentucky State University, an HBCU.

== AFL career ==
Leaving the NFL, Wyman began his Arena Football League career with the San Jose SaberCats in 2003. Staying with the team until 2005, Wyman was part of the SaberCats team that won ArenaBowl XVIII. The Kentucky State alum left San Jose for the Dallas Desperados in 2006. Wyman left Dallas in 2007 for the Utah Blaze. Following his first season with Utah, Wyman re-signed with the team on August 2, 2008.
