= Clint Dolezel =

American football player and coach (born 1970)

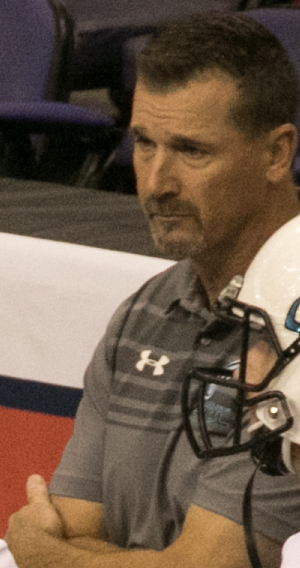
- Dolezel in 2017

East Texas A&M Lions
- Title: Head coach

Personal information
- Born: March 25, 1970 (age 56); Waco, Texas, U.S.
- Listed height: 6 ft 4 in (1.93 m)
- Listed weight: 205 lb (93 kg)

Career information
- Position: Quarterback
- High school: Robinson (Robinson, Texas)
- College: East Texas State
- NFL draft: 1994: undrafted

Career history

Playing
- Milwaukee Mustangs (1995–1996); Texas Terror/Houston Thunderbears (1997–1999); Chicago Bears (2000)*; Grand Rapids Rampage (2001–2003); Las Vegas Gladiators (2004–2005); Dallas Desperados (2006–2008)
- * Offseason or practice squad member only

Coaching
- Florida Firecats (2009) Offensive coordinator; San Angelo Stampede Express (2010) Head coach; Dallas Vigilantes (2011) Head coach; Philadelphia Soul (2012) Offensive coordinator; Philadelphia Soul (2013–2019) Head coach; Beijing Lions (2016) Head coach; Frisco Fighters (2020–2021) Head coach; Texas A&M–Commerce / East Texas A&M (2023–present) Head coach

Awards and highlights
- 3× ArenaBowl champion (XV, XXIX, XXX); 2× Second-team All-Arena (2001, 2007); First-team All-Arena (2006); Al Lucas Hero Team (2007); 4× AFL passing yards leader (1998, 1999, 2002, 2004); 4× AFL passing touchdowns leader (1998, 1999, 2002, 2006); Arena Football Hall of Fame (2012); AFL's 25 Greatest Players #8 (2012); 3× AFL Coach of the Year (2015, 2016, 2019); China Bowl champion (2016); CAFL All-Pro North Division coach (2016)

Career AFL statistics
- Comp. / Att.: 3,749 / 5,698
- Passing yards: 44,564
- TD-INT: 931–155
- Passer rating: 117.75
- Rushing touchdowns: 41
- Stats at ArenaFan.com

Clint Dolezel (born March 25, 1970) is an American football coach and former quarterback in the Arena Football League (AFL). He currently serves as the head football coach at East Texas A&M University.

Dolezel played as a quarterback in the AFL before becoming the head coach of the Philadelphia Soul from 2013 until the league folded in 2019. He played college football for the East Texas State Lions, and was in the AFL for 13 seasons from 1995 to 2008. Dolezel first became a head coach in 2010 with the San Angelo Stampede Express of the Indoor Football League (IFL). After just a single season, Dolezel returned to the AFL as the head coach of the Dallas Vigilantes. After the Vigilantes franchise suspended operations, Dolezel joined the Philadelphia Soul as their offensive coordinator under head coach Doug Plank. Plank left the Soul following the 2012 season, and the team promoted Dolezel to head coach. He was named the inaugural head coach of the Frisco Fighters in the IFL before the 2020 season. On December 7, 2022, it was announced that Dolezel would return to his alma mater, East Texas A&M University, to serve as the school's head football coach.

As an AFL player, he was originally signed by the Milwaukee Mustangs. In his career, he also played for the Texas Terror / Houston ThunderBears, Grand Rapids Rampage, Las Vegas Gladiators, and the Dallas Desperados. Dolezel was also a scout for the Dallas Cowboys in 2007.

== Early life ==
Born in Waco, Texas, to Johnnie and Judy Dolezel, Clint attended Robinson High School in Robinson, Texas, where he was a standout quarterback and golfer.

== College career ==
After graduating from Robinson, Dolezel attended Cisco College and was a student and a letterman in football. In football, he was a second-team All-Conference selection as a sophomore. After graduating from Cisco, he committed to the University of Southern Mississippi. However, a coaching change landed Dolezel at East Texas State University to play for coach Eddie Vowell. Dolezel was a letterman in football, golf, and track and field at East Texas State, becoming one of just three documented three-sport athletes in the history of the university. He quarterbacked the Lions in 1992 and 1993 and ended his career as a Lion throwing for 3,152 yards and 23 touchdowns over 2 seasons. The Lions finished 8–2 during his junior year and finished second in the Lone Star Conference.

== Professional career ==
After establishing himself as one of the best young quarterbacks in the AFL, Dolezel signed with the Chicago Bears in 2000.

Dolezel, along with wide receiver Terrill Shaw, helped the Grand Rapids Rampage win the 2001 ArenaBowl. Dolezel and Shaw became teammates again playing for the Dallas Desperados in 2006.

In September 2003, the Rampage traded Dolezel to the Las Vegas Gladiators for Sedrick Robinson, Paul LaQuerre and Hardy Mitchell.

On March 12, 2006, Dolezel threw his 700th career touchdown, becoming just the third quarterback in AFL history to do so. The Desperados won that game versus the Tampa Bay Storm 64–35.

On April 16, 2007, in a 51–41 home win against the Philadelphia Soul, Dolezel became the first professional quarterback to throw 800 touchdown passes. In 2007, Dolezel became the first quarterback in league history to lead his team to 15 wins in a season. Despite the 15–1 record, Dallas lost to the 7–9 Columbus Destroyers in the first round of the playoffs. In a 2008 game versus the Grand Rapids Rampage, Dolezel became the first quarterback in league history to throw for 900 touchdown passes in a career.

== Coaching career ==
Dolezel had said that he would like to be a coach after his career is over. It was announced that on January 19, Dolezel would become the offensive coordinator for the Florida Firecats' 2009 season (due to the Arena Football League suspending operations for 2009). He was the head coach of the San Angelo Stampede Express of the Indoor Football League in 2010.

Dolezel was announced as the head coach for the Dallas Vigilantes for the 2011 season. The team did not play in 2012 for unknown reasons.

On August 21, 2012, Dolezel was promoted from offensive coordinator to head coach of the Philadelphia Soul.

On September 16, 2014, Dolezel re-signed with the Soul for two more seasons.

In June 2016, Dolezel was announced as the first head coach of the China Arena Football League's Beijing Lions. He was named an All-Pro North Division All-Star as a head coach. On November 6, 2016, the Lions won the first China Bowl and finished the season undefeated.

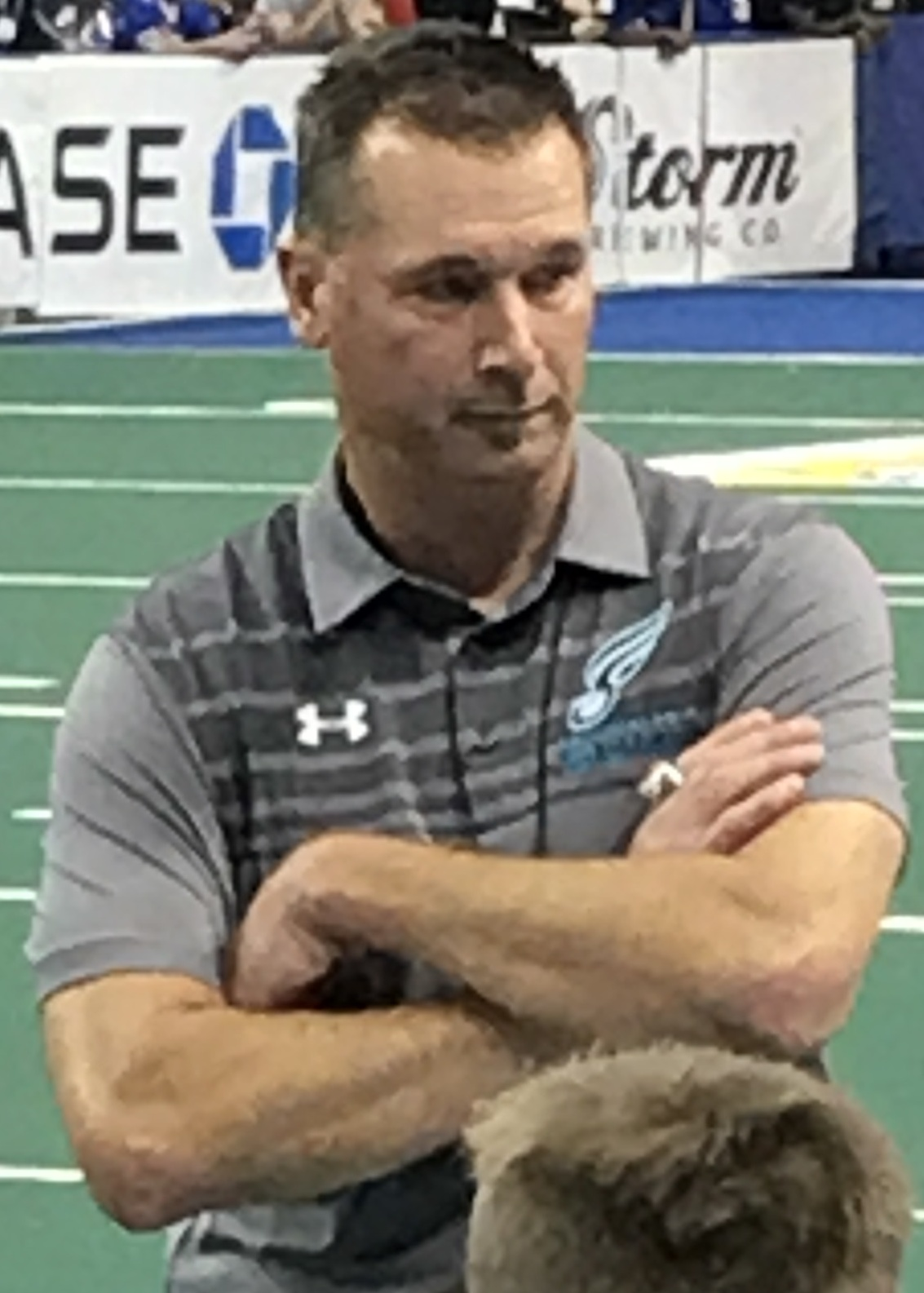
Dolezel in 2017

On August 25, 2016, Dolezel was named the 2016 Marcum-Moss Head Coach of the Year. A day later, he won his first ArenaBowl championship as a coach when the Soul defeated the Arizona Rattlers, 56–42, in ArenaBowl XXIX in Glendale, Arizona.

On August 26, 2017, the Soul beat the Tampa Bay Storm in ArenaBowl XXX by a score of 44–40.

In 2019, the AFL folded and Dolezel was hired as the inaugural head coach of the Frisco Fighters in the Indoor Football League before the 2020 season. However, the 2020 season was cancelled due to the onset of the COVID-19 pandemic. He returned to Frisco for the 2021 season, leading the team to a 10–3 record and made it to the league semifinal. Near the end 2021 season, Dolezel was signed to a multi-year extension, but ultimately chose to leave the team to pursue other opportunities.

Dolezel served as a quarterback coach consultant for Zachary Levi in preparation for the 2021 film, American Underdog: The Kurt Warner Story. Levi starred as Kurt Warner, the Super Bowl champion and Hall of Fame NFL quarterback, in the film. Dolezel assisted in training Levi with mechanics, physical training and throwing. Dolezel played against Warner when the duo played in the Arena Football League.

Dolezel was named the 21st head coach in the history of the football program at East Texas A&M University, his alma mater, on December 7, 2022. He became just the third alum to take the reins of the Lion football program, and the first since 1930. In his first year, the Lions went 1–9.

== Career statistics ==
=== Playing career ===
Legend
	Won the ArenaBowl
	Led the league
**Bold**	Career high

Year	Team	Passing							Rushing		
Year	Team	Cmp	Att	Pct	Yds	TD	Int	Rtg	Att	Yds	TD
1995	Milwaukee	10	12	**83.3**	121	2	1	113.5	3	5	1
1996	Milwaukee	9	16	56.3	103	2	1	80.9	2	3	1
1997	Texas	259	388	66.8	3,377	69	15	117.4	19	7	7
1998	Houston	343	558	61.5	4,228	81	17	108.4	17	16	5
1999	Houston	374	556	67.3	4,336	80	**19**	112.3	**22**	4	3
2001	Grand Rapids	364	574	63.4	3,952	80	10	111.2	8	14	2
2002	Grand Rapids	339	505	67.1	3,878	79	**19**	113.4	7	−9	1
2003	Grand Rapids	361	545	66.2	4,431	89	15	119.2	10	8	2
2004	Las Vegas	**381**	**585**	65.1	4,428	93	12	118.9	**22**	**48**	**9**
2005	Las Vegas	302	465	64.9	3,505	78	16	112.8	6	1	0
2006	Dallas	375	573	65.4	**4,685**	105	11	122.2	**22**	21	3
2007	Dallas	375	533	70.4	4,474	**107**	9	**128.2**	10	−2	1
2008	Dallas	257	388	66.2	3,046	66	10	118.8	11	12	6
Career		3,749	5,698	65.8	44,564	931	155	117.75	159	128	41

=== Head coaching record ===
==== Professional ====
Team	Year	Regular season				Postseason			
Team	Year	Won	Lost	Win %	Finish	Won	Lost	Win %	Result
SAS	2010	10	4	.714	2nd in Intense Lonestar East	1	1	.500	Lost Divisionals II (Billings)
IFL total		10	4	.714		1	1	.500	
DAL	2011	11	7	.611	2nd in AC Central	0	1	.000	Lost to Chicago Rush in Conference Semifinals.
PHI	2013	12	6	.667	2nd in AC Central	2	1	.667	Lost to Arizona Rattlers in ArenaBowl XXVI
PHI	2014	9	9	.500	3rd in AC Central	0	1	.000	Lost to Cleveland Gladiators in Conference Semifinals
PHI	2015	15	3	.833	1st in AC Central	1	1	.500	Lost to Jacksonville Sharks in AC Championship
PHI	2016	13	3	.813	1st in AC	3	0	1.000	Won ArenaBowl XXIX
PHI	2017	13	1	.929	1st in AFL	2	0	1.000	Won ArenaBowl XXX
PHI	2018	7	5	.583	3rd in AFL	0	2	.000	Lost to Baltimore Brigade in Semifinals
PHI	2019	7	5	.583	3rd in AFL	2	1	.667	Lost to Albany Empire in ArenaBowl XXXII
AFL total		87	39	.690		10	6	.625	
BEI	2016	5	0	1.000	1st in CAFL	1	0	1.000	Won China Bowl
CAFL total		5	0	1.000		1	0	1.000	
FRI	2021	10	3	.769	3rd in IFL	1	1	.500	Lost to Massachusetts Pirates in Semifinals
IFL total		10	3	.769		1	1	.500	
Career total		112	46	.709		13	8	.619	

==== College ====
Year	Team	Overall	Conference	Standing	Bowl/playoffs
**Texas A&M–Commerce / East Texas A&M Lions** (Southland Conference) (2023–present)
2023	Texas A&M–Commerce	1–9	2–5	6th	
2024	East Texas A&M	3–9	2–4	7th	
2025	East Texas A&M	3–9	3–5	T–7th	
Texas A&M–Commerce / East Texas A&M:		7–27	7–14		
Total:		7–27			
