= Will McClay =

American football coach and executive (born 1966)

Dallas Cowboys
- Title: Vice president of player personnel

Personal information
- Born: October 13, 1966 (age 60); Memphis, Tennessee, U.S.
- Listed height: 6 ft 0 in (1.83 m)
- Listed weight: 245 lb (111 kg)

Career information
- Positions: Wide receiver, linebacker
- College: Rice

Career history

Playing
- Detroit Drive (1989–1992)

Coaching
- Detroit Drive (1993) Secondary and special teams coach; Milwaukee Mustangs (1995) Defensive coordinator; Florida Bobcats (1996) Defensive coordinator; Anaheim Piranhas (1997) Defensive coordinator; Grand Rapids Rampage (1998) Defensive coordinator; Grand Rapids Rampage (1999) Assistant head coach and defensive coordinator; Dallas Desperados (2002–2003) Defensive coordinator; Dallas Desperados (2004–2008) Head coach

Operations
- Anaheim Piranhas (1997) Director of player personnel; Grand Rapids Rampage (1998) Director of player personnel; Orlando Rage (2001) Director of player personnel; Jacksonville Jaguars (2001) Assistant director of pro scouting; Dallas Cowboys (2002–2008) Pro scout; Dallas Cowboys (2009–2010) Pro scouting coordinator; Dallas Cowboys (2011–2013) Director of football research; Dallas Cowboys (2014) Assistant director of player personnel; Dallas Cowboys (2015–2016) Senior director of pro/college scouting; Dallas Cowboys (2017–present) Vice president of player personnel

Awards and highlights
- 3× ArenaBowl champion (1989, 1990, 1992); AFL Coach of the Year (2006)

Career AFL statistics
- Receptions: 30
- Yards: 422
- Touchdowns: 3
- Tackles: 75
- Interceptions: 3
- Stats at ArenaFan.com

Head coaching record
- Regular season: 55–26–1 (.677)
- Postseason: 1–3 (.250)
- Career: 153–135 (.531)

Will McClay (born October 13, 1966) is an American football executive who is the vice president of player personnel for the Dallas Cowboys. He is also a former player and coach, primarily in various roles within the Arena Football League.

== Early life ==
McClay was born on October 13, 1966, in Memphis, Tennessee, but he grew up outside of Houston, Texas. He attended Missouri City Jr. High and Marian Christian High School. As a freshman, he played wide receiver and contributed to the team winning the 1981 Class 3A state title. As a senior, he was the starting quarterback, leading the team to win the 1984 Class 3A state titles.

He accepted a football scholarship from Rice University. He was recruited by future NFL head coach Mike Nolan to play as a defensive back. He was a four-year starter and a captain. He earned a bachelor's degree in political science.

== Playing career ==
His football career took off as a player at Rice University, where he started all four years of his collegiate career (1985–1988) as a defensive back. In 1988, he was picked up by the Arena League football Detroit Drive, where he played as a wide receiver and defensive back for four seasons (1989–1992).

His best year was his last, in 1992 when he racked up 34 tackles and one interception. By the end of his playing career he had helped the Drive win three arena league football titles in four appearances.

== Coaching and front office career ==
After his career as a player, he got an opportunity to serve as the Drive's secondary and special teams coach (1993). He took two separate stints as a defensive coordinator for the Milwaukee Mustangs and the Florida Bobcats in 1995 and 1996 respectively.

He moved into the management side of football in 1997 where he serves as both the defensive coordinator and the director of player personnel for the Anaheim Piranhas. He took the job as an assistant head coach and director of player personnel of the Grand Rapids Rampage in 1998 and 1999.

McClay moved onto the XFL, where he became the director of player personnel, consultant, and scout for the Orlando Rage. He made the jump into the NFL as the assistant director of Pro Scouting for the Jacksonville Jaguars (2001) where his main job was to scout teams that Jacksonville did not play that year in attempt to advance scouting information.

He then moved on to the Dallas Cowboys player personnel department only to finally come full circle as the defensive coordinator for the Arena League Dallas Desperados. In 2002, he served as the inaugural defensive coordinator and that's where he would stay until the beginning of the 2004 season when he was thrust into the role as head coach just days before the season, after Joe Avezzano was hired by Norv Turner as the special teams coach for the Oakland Raiders. He would remain head coach for the next five seasons where he accumulated an overall record of 55–28–1 and a 1–3 postseason record.

In 2013, he was promoted to the position of assistant director of Player Personnel over Tom Ciskowski, after the Cowboys where criticized in the media for their first round moves in the 2013 NFL draft. He also oversaw his first NFL draft in 2014. In 2015, he was named Senior Director of Pro/College Scouting. In 2017, he earned the title of Vice President of Player Personnel.

On January 29, 2025, McClay and the Cowboys agreed to a five-year contract extension.
