= 2007 Arena Football League season =

- League: Arena Football League
- Sport: Arena football
- Duration: March 1, 2007 – July 29, 2007

Regular season
- Season champions: Dallas Desperados

AFL playoffs
- National Conference champions: Columbus Destroyers
- National Conference runners-up: Georgia Force
- American Conference champions: San Jose SaberCats
- American Conference runners-up: Chicago Rush

ArenaBowl XXI
- Champions: San Jose SaberCats
- Runners-up: Columbus Destroyers
- Finals MVP: Mark Grieb, SJ

AFL seasons
- ← 2006 2008 →

National: Eastern, Southern
American: Western, Central

The 2007 Arena Football League season was the 21st season of the Arena Football League. The regular season began play on March 1, 2007 and concluded on June 25. The league broke its regular-season total attendance record, with 1,887,054 people in attendance this season.

Following a year-long hiatus last year in the aftermath of Hurricane Katrina, the New Orleans VooDoo franchise resumed play this season to return the league to a 19-team format. New Orleans also hosted ArenaBowl XXI. This was the last of three non-consecutive AFL seasons in which the league fielded 19 teams, the most in AFL history.

The league champions were the San Jose SaberCats, who defeated the Columbus Destroyers in ArenaBowl XXI.

== Final standings ==
National Conference
Eastern Division
| Team | W | L | PCT | PF | PA | DIV | CON | Home | Away |
| Dallas Desperados | 15 | 1 | .938 | 1016 | 816 | 8–0 | 11–1 | 8–0 | 7–1 |
| Philadelphia Soul | 8 | 8 | .500 | 900 | 835 | 5–3 | 7–5 | 4–4 | 4–4 |
| Columbus Destroyers | 7 | 9 | .438 | 802 | 793 | 3–3 | 5–6 | 5–3 | 2–6 |
| New York Dragons | 5 | 11 | .313 | 787 | 967 | 1–4 | 3–8 | 2–6 | 3–5 |
Southern Division
| Team | W | L | PCT | PF | PA | DIV | CON | Home | Away |
| Georgia Force | 14 | 2 | .875 | 1007 | 836 | 8–0 | 11–1 | 8–0 | 6–2 |
| Tampa Bay Storm | 9 | 7 | .563 | 809 | 825 | 4–4 | 6–6 | 5–3 | 4–4 |
| Orlando Predators | 8 | 8 | .500 | 814 | 766 | 5–3 | 7–5 | 4–4 | 4–4 |
| New Orleans VooDoo | 5 | 11 | .313 | 833 | 928 | 2–6 | 3–9 | 4–4 | 1–7 |
| Austin Wranglers | 4 | 12 | .250 | 879 | 950 | 1–7 | 2–10 | 3–5 | 1–7 |
American Conference
Central Division
| Team | W | L | PCT | PF | PA | DIV | CON | Home | Away |
| Chicago Rush | 12 | 4 | .750 | 869 | 719 | 6–2 | 9–3 | 7–1 | 5–3 |
| Kansas City Brigade | 10 | 6 | .625 | 840 | 776 | 4–4 | 8–4 | 6–2 | 4–4 |
| Colorado Crush | 8 | 8 | .500 | 793 | 858 | 4–4 | 6–6 | 5–3 | 3–5 |
| Nashville Kats | 7 | 9 | .438 | 851 | 876 | 3–5 | 6–6 | 3–5 | 4–4 |
| Grand Rapids Rampage | 4 | 12 | .250 | 835 | 1014 | 3–5 | 3–9 | 3–5 | 1–7 |
Western Division
| Team | W | L | PCT | PF | PA | DIV | CON | Home | Away |
| San Jose SaberCats | 13 | 3 | .813 | 1012 | 761 | 8–0 | 11–1 | 8–0 | 5–3 |
| Los Angeles Avengers | 9 | 7 | .563 | 843 | 848 | 4–4 | 6–6 | 5–3 | 4–4 |
| Utah Blaze | 8 | 8 | .500 | 955 | 933 | 4–4 | 6–6 | 4–4 | 4–4 |
| Arizona Rattlers | 4 | 12 | .250 | 846 | 915 | 3–5 | 2–9 | 2–6 | 2–6 |
| Las Vegas Gladiators | 2 | 14 | .125 | 769 | 895 | 1–7 | 2–10 | 0–8 | 2–6 |

- Green indicates clinched playoff berth
- Purple indicates division champion
- Grey indicates division champion and conference's best record

Source: ArenaFan.com

== Playoffs ==
6 | Columbus | 56
6 | Columbus | 66
3 | Tampa Bay | 55
1 | Dallas | 59
National Conference
6 | Columbus | 66
2 | Georgia | 56
5 | Orlando | 26 | National Conference Championship
4 | Philadelphia | 39
4 | Philadelphia | 41
2 | Georgia | 65
Wild-card round
Divisional round
N6 | Columbus | 33
A1 | San Jose | 55
5 | Utah | 42 | ArenaBowl XXI
4 | Los Angeles | 20
4 | Los Angeles | 64
2 | Chicago | 52
American Conference
2 | Chicago | 49
1 | San Jose | 61
6 | Colorado | 49 | American Conference Championship
6 | Colorado | 67
3 | Kansas City | 42
1 | San Jose | 76

== Statistics ==
=== Quarterback ===
| Player | Comp. | Att. | Comp% | Yards | TD's | INT's | Long | Rating |
|---|---|---|---|---|---|---|---|---|
| Chris Greisen (GEO) | 392 | 530 | 74 | 4851 | 117 | 12 | 49 | 132 |
| Clint Dolezel (DAL) | 375 | 533 | 70.4 | 4475 | 107 | 9 | 49 | 128.2 |
| Mark Grieb (SJS) | 398 | 561 | 70.9 | 4605 | 100 | 13 | 47 | 125.3 |
| Joe Germaine (UTA) | 422 | 617 | 68.4 | 5005 | 107 | 12 | 41 | 124.4 |
| Raymond Philyaw (KC) | 371 | 538 | 69 | 4338 | 85 | 11 | 42 | 124.1 |

=== Running backs ===
| Player | Car. | Yards | Avg. | TD's | Long |
|---|---|---|---|---|---|
| Dan Alexander (NSH) | 165 | 426 | 2.6 | 41 | 25 |
| Adrian McPherson* (AUS) | 55 | 360 | 6.5 | 9 | 39 |
| Josh White (DAL) | 93 | 278 | 3 | 10 | 22 |
| Bo Kelly (ARI) | 81 | 222 | 2.7 | 13 | 16 |
| Harold Wells (CLB) | 73 | 197 | 2.7 | 13 | 13 |

*McPherson is a Quarterback, he was on the rushing yards list at arenafootball.com

=== Wide receivers ===
| Player | Rec. | Yards | Avg. | TD's | Long |
|---|---|---|---|---|---|
| Siaha Burley (UTA) | 166 | 2129 | 12.8 | 49 | 41 |
| Chris Jackson (GEO) | 145 | 1915 | 13.2 | 47 | 46 |
| Derrick Lewis (AUS) | 139 | 1903 | 13.7 | 41 | 49 |
| Bobby Sippio (CHI) | 125 | 1739 | 13.9 | 53 | 48 |
| Troy Bergeron (GEO) | 132 | 1736 | 13.2 | 41 | 49 |

=== Touchdowns ===
| Player | TD's | Rush | Rec | Ret | Pts |
|---|---|---|---|---|---|
| Bobby Sippio (CHI) | 53 | 0 | 53 | 0 | 318 |
| Chris Jackson (GEO) | 51 | 4 | 47 | 0 | 306 |
| Siaha Burley (UTA) | 49 | 0 | 49 | 0 | 294 |
| Damian Harrell (COL) | 47 | 0 | 47 | 0 | 282 |
| Will Pettis (DAL) | 46 | 2 | 40 | 4 | 278 |

=== Defense ===
| Player | Tackles | Solo | Assisted | Sack | Solo | Assisted | INT | Yards | TD's | Long |
|---|---|---|---|---|---|---|---|---|---|---|
| Rashad Floyd (COL) | 156 | 141 | 30 | 0 | 0 | 0 | 9 | 111 | 2 | 25 |
| Keyuo Craver (ARI) | 113 | 97 | 32 | 0 | 0 | 0 | 3 | 37 | 0 | 21 |
| Lin-J Shell (ORL) | 110.5 | 105 | 11 | 0 | 0 | 0 | 4 | 0 | 0 | 0 |
| Brandon Hefflin (CLB) | 105 | 88 | 34 | 0 | 0 | 0 | 2 | 0 | 0 | 0 |

=== Special teams ===
==== Kick return ====
| Player | Ret | Yards | TD's | Long | Avg | Ret | Yards | TD's | Long | Avg |
|---|---|---|---|---|---|---|---|---|---|---|
| Timon Marshall (GR) | 83 | 1901 | 6 | 58 | 22.9 | 1 | 7 | 0 | 7 | 7 |
| Sedrick Robinson (AUS) | 64 | 1300 | 4 | 58 | 20.3 | 0 | 0 | 0 | 0 | 0 |
| DaShane Dennis (NYD) | 58 | 1282 | 3 | 57 | 22.1 | 2 | 29 | 0 | 20 | 14.5 |
| Will Pettis (DAL) | 58 | 1229 | 4 | 58 | 21.2 | 2 | 18 | 0 | 18 | 9 |
| Darrell Jones (ARI) | 56 | 1080 | 1 | 56 | 19.3 | 1 | 55 | 1 | 55 | 55 |

==== Kicking ====
| Player | Extra pt. | Extra pt. Att. | FG | FGA | Long | Pct. | Pts |
|---|---|---|---|---|---|---|---|
| A.J. Haglund* (SJ) | 128 | 138 | 10 | 18 | 39 | 0.556 | 158 |
| Mark Lewis (AUS) | 110 | 118 | 15 | 25 | 33 | 0.600 | 155 |
| Remy Hamilton (LA) | 101 | 114 | 16 | 30 | 36 | 0.533 | 149 |
| Steve Videtich (UTA) | 113 | 127 | 10 | 19 | 32 | 0.526 | 143 |
| Jason Ball (COL) | 90 | 105 | 17 | 28 | 38 | 0.607 | 141 |

*Set AFL record for tackles by a Kicker with 15.5.

== Awards ==
=== Individual season awards ===
| Award | Player/Coach | Team |
|---|---|---|
| Coach of the Year | Doug Plank | Georgia Force |
| Rookie of the Year (tie) | Brett Dietz; Charles Frederick | Tampa Bay Storm; Kansas City Brigade |
| Lineman of the Year | Greg White | Orlando Predators |
| Kicker of the Year | Mark Lewis | Austin Wranglers |
| Ironman of the Year | Will Pettis | Dallas Desperados |

=== All-Arena team ===
Offense
| Position | First team | Second team |
|---|---|---|
| Quarterback | Chris Greisen, Georgia | Clint Dolezel, Dallas |
| Fullback | Dan Alexander, Nashville | Josh White, Dallas |
| Center | Kyle Moore-Brown, Colorado | Mike Mabry, Philadelphia |
| Offensive lineman | Phil Bogle, Philadelphia; Devin Wyman, Dallas | Marcus Keyes, Georgia; Terrance Dotsy, Dallas |
| Wide receiver | Chris Jackson, Los Angeles; Bobby Sippio, Chicago; Siaha Burley, Utah | Damian Harrell, Colorado; Troy Bergeron, Georgia; James Roe, San Jose |

Defense
| Position | First team | Second team |
|---|---|---|
| Defensive lineman | Greg White, Orlando; Colston Weatherington, Dallas; LaKendrick Jones, Columbus | Jermaine Smith, Georgia; Ron Jones, San Jose; Silas DeMary, Los Angeles |
| Middle linebacker | Duke Pettijohn, Dallas | Umar Muhammad, Georgia |
| Jack linebacker | DeJuan Alfonzo, Chicago | Lawrence Samuels, Tampa Bay |
| Defensive back | Eddie Moten, Philadelphia; Ahmad Hawkins, Nashville; Clevan Thomas, San Jose | Rashad Floyd, Colorado; Jeremy Unertl, Chicago; Jermaine Jones, Dallas |

Special teams
| Position | First team | Second team |
|---|---|---|
| Kicker | Mark Lewis, Austin | A. J. Haglund, San Jose |
