= Dallas Desperados =

Arena football team

Logo

General information
- Founded: 2002
- Folded: 2009
- Headquartered: American Airlines Center in Dallas, Texas
- Colors: Blue, white, black
- Mascot: Kid Coyote

Personnel
- Owner: Jerry Jones
- Head coach: Will McClay
- President: Shy Anderson

Team history
- Dallas Desperados (2002–2008)

Home fields
- American Airlines Center (2002, 2004–2008); Reunion Arena (2003)

League / conference affiliations
- Arena Football League (2002–2008): American Conference (2002–2008); Eastern Division (2002–2008)

Playoff appearances (3)
- 2003, 2006, 2007

The Dallas Desperados were a professional arena football team based in Dallas, Texas. They played in the Eastern Division of the Arena Football League from 2002 to 2008.

The franchise began as an expansion team and posted a winning record in all but one season. It was owned by Jerry Jones, who also owns the Dallas Cowboys. His son-in-law Shy Anderson was the chief operating officer and oversaw the day-to-day operations.

The team folded effective August 4, 2009, upon the dissolution of the original AFL. Unlike former owners of most defunct AFL teams, Jones maintains the intellectual property rights to the Desperados.

== History ==
During a halftime interview at a Cowboys preseason game on August 12, 2000, Jerry Jones revealed to Babe Laufenberg that the AFL had granted him an expansion franchise to begin play in 2001. On November 14, 2001, Dallas officially joined the AFL. The team was originally going to be named the "Dallas Texans", following in the footsteps of Dallas' former AFL franchise which existed from 1990 to 1993, when he sold the rights to the name "Texans" for $10 million to the new Houston franchise. After a contest in which fans voted via the team's official website, the new Dallas team was eventually named the Desperados. Jones appointed Cowboys special teams coach Joe Avezzano as head coach, and on November 21, 2001, in the AFL expansion draft, they acquired their first player, lineman Aaron Hamilton.

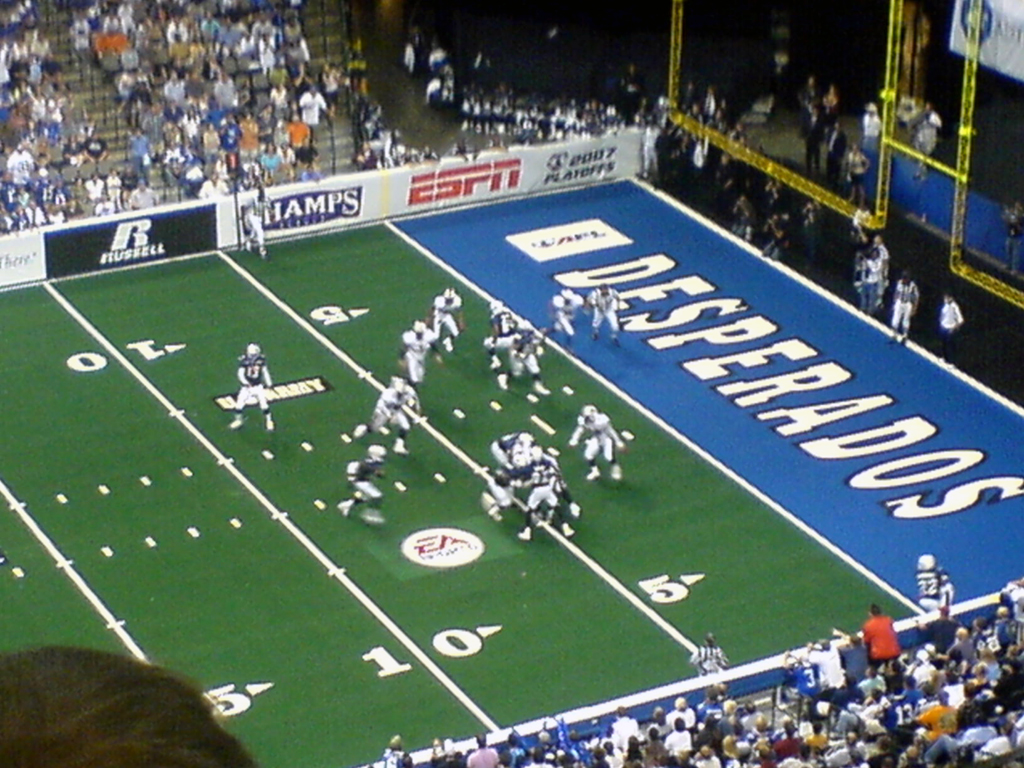
The Dallas Desperados in action.

Avezzano, along with starting quarterback Andy Kelly, led the team to a respectable 7–7 record and a playoff appearance in the team's first season of play, and a 10–6 record and a second consecutive playoff berth in 2003 under new quarterback Jim Kubiak. He was fired from the Cowboys staff that season, then resigned as Desperados head coach when he accepted a job with the Oakland Raiders.

Before the 2004 season, Jones hired Will McClay to replace Avezzano, and McClay struggled to a 6–10 record his rookie season as coach. The team improved to 8–7–1 the following season and barely missed making the playoffs, and under the helm of quarterback/offensive coordinator Clint Dolezel, posted a 13–3 record in 2006 and made their first appearance in an AFL conference championship game, losing to the Orlando Predators. The following season saw the Desperados post an AFL record fifteen wins and the team appeared destined to make their first ArenaBowl appearance, but they were shocked by the Columbus Destroyers, who had entered the playoffs with a 7–9 record, in the first round. The upset is ranked by many among the greatest of all time. The following season saw no relief to the postseason failure as the Desperados at 12–4 lost to the 8–8 New York Dragons in Dallas. After the New Orleans VooDoo folded, the league placed the Desperados in the South Division after the team had spent five seasons as an Eastern Division powerhouse.

With the exception of one playoff game and the entirety of the 2003 season, the Desperados played all of their home games at American Airlines Center. The team's official mascot was Kid Coyote.

=== Memorable moments ===
On June 9, 2007, the Desperados faced the 4–9 New Orleans VooDoo. The 13–1 Desperados found themselves losing late in the game. But Dallas Quarterback Clint Dolezel threw a touchdown with 30 seconds left on the clock to give the Desperados the lead. On the ensuing kickoff, the VooDoo fielded the ball off the net and found themselves looking at a long way to the endzone from their own one-yard line. They managed to put together a lengthy drive and were able to score with 1.7 seconds left to make the score 80–79. Rather than tie the game with an extra point, they elected to go for the win with a two-point conversion. VooDoo Quarterback Steve Bellisari dropped back and was sacked by 2007 AFL lineman of the year Colston Weatherington on the ten. The game was over along with the VooDoo playoff hopes. In the end, Dallas won 80–79.

The game was voted 2007 "Game of the Year" leaguewide in July 2007.

=== Season-by-season ===
ArenaBowl champions	ArenaBowl appearance	Division champions	Playoff berth

Season	League	Conference	Division	Regular season				Postseason results
Season	League	Conference	Division	Finish	Wins	Losses	Ties	Postseason results
Dallas Desperados
2002	AFL	American	Western	4th	7	7	0	Won Wild Card Round (Indiana) 47–46; Lost Quarterfinals (Chicago) 60–47
2003	AFL	American	Central	1st	10	6	0	Lost Wild Card Round (Georgia) 49–45
2004	AFL	National	Eastern	3rd	6	10	0	
2005	AFL	National	Eastern	2nd	8	7	1	
2006	AFL	National	Eastern	1st	13	3	0	Won Divisional Round (Georgia) 62–27; Lost Conference Championship (Orlando) 45–28
2007	AFL	National	Eastern	1st	15	1	0	Lost Divisional Round (Columbus) 66–59
2008	AFL	National	Eastern	2nd	12	4	0	Lost Wild Card Round (New York) 77–63
2009	The AFL suspended operations for the 2009 season.							
Total					71	38	1	(includes only regular season)
Total					2	5	—	(includes only the postseason)
Total					73	43	1	(includes both regular season and postseason)

=== Coaches ===
Head coach	Tenure	Regular season record (W-L)	Postseason record (W-L)	Most recent coaching staff	Notes
Joe Avezzano	2002 – 2003	17–13	1–2	DC: Will McClay (2002–2006)	
Will McClay	2004 – 2008	54–24–1	1–3	Offensive Line: Steve Criswell; Special Teams: Adriel Fenton; DC: James Fuller (2007 – 2008)	Continued as DC for three seasons. 2006 Arena Football League; Coach of the Year

== Players ==
=== Arena Football Hall of Famer ===
Dallas Desperados Hall of Famers
No.	Name	Year inducted	Position(s)	Years w/ Desperados
13	Clint Dolezel	2013	QB	2006–08

=== Individual awards ===
Lineman of the Year
Season	Player	Position
2003	Tom Briggs	OL/DL
2006	Colston Weatherington	OL/DL
2008	Colston Weatherington	DL

Ironman of the Year
Season	Player	Position
2007	Will Pettis	WR/DB
2008	Will Pettis	WR/DB

=== All-Arena ===
The following Desperados players were named to All-Arena Teams:

- QB Clint Dolezel (2)
- FB Josh White (1)
- FB/LB Duke Pettijohn (1)
- WR/DB Will Pettis (3)
- OL/DL Tom Briggs (1), Colston Weatherington (1)
- OL Devin Wyman (1), Terrance Dotsy (1)
- DL Colston Weatherington (2)
- LB Duke Pettijohn (2)
- DB Jermaine Jones (1)
- K Remy Hamilton (1)

=== All-Ironman ===
The following Desperados players were named to All-Ironman Teams:

- FB/LB Duke Pettijohn (3)
- WR/DB Will Pettis (5)
- OL/DL Tom Briggs (1)

=== All-Rookie ===
The following Desperados players were named to All-Rookie Teams:

- QB Clint Stoerner
- FB/LB Ja'Mar Toombs
- WR/DB Will Pettis
- WR/LB Andy McCullough
- OL/DL Shante Carver, Colston Weatherington
- DB Bobby Keyes
- DS Kareem Larrimore, Jermaine Jones

== See also ==
- Dallas Texans
- Fort Worth Cavalry
- Dallas Vigilantes
