= List of Colorado Crush players =

List of players who played for the Colorado Crush team of the Arena Football League, from the team's inception in 2003 to its folding in 2008:

• Maurice Anderson (2005)
• Chris Angel, DB (2007–2008)
• Jason Ball, K (2007)
• Dustin Barno, OL/DL (2004–2007)
• Chris Berg (2006)
• Damon Bowers (2003)
• Michael Bragg, DB (2008)
• Anthony Brenner (2004)
• Cyron Brown (2003)
• Butler By'Not'e (2003)
• Dion Byrum (2008)
• Toure Carter, WR/DB (2004–2006)
• Jeff Chase (2003)
• Herb Coleman (2003)
• Andy Collins (2008)
• Andrew Cooper (2003)
• Charlie Davidson (2003)
• Jose Davis, QB (2004–2005)
• Anthony Derricks (2003)
• Quinn Dorsey, DL (2007)
• Joe Douglass (2003)
• Joey Dozier (2003)
• Chad Dukes, FB/LB (2004–2005)
• Anthony Dunn, OL/DL (2006–2007)
• John Dutton, QB (2003–2008)
• Rashad Floyd, WR/DB, DS, DB (2004–2008)
• Johnathan Goddard (2008)
• Daniel Greer (2003)
• Marrio Grier (2003)
• Geof Groshelle (2003)
• Aaron Hamilton (2003)
• Jason Harmon, DB (2007–2008)
• Damian Harrell, OS, WR (2003–2007)
• Ahmad Hawkins, WR/DB (2003–2006)
• Evan Hlavacek, WR/DB (2006)
• Joey Hollenbeck, OL (2008)
• Aaron Hosack, WR (2008)
• Delvin Hughley, WR/DB, DB (2003; 2005–2008)
• Hugh Hunter, OL/DL (2004–2006)
• Brett Huyser, OL (2007–2008)
• Chris Janek (2003)
• Aaron Johnson, OL/DL (2004; 2006)
• Brandon Kirsch, QB (2007–2008)
• Don Klein, OL/DL (2004–2005)
• Darcey Levy (2005)
• Adrian Lunsford (2003)
• Antonio Malone, DB (2008)
• Willis Marshall, WR/DB (2004–2006)
• Aaron McConnell, DL (2008)
• Andy McCullough, WR/LB (2005–2006)
• Kevin McKenzie, WR/DB (2004–2005)
• Dwayne Missouri (2003)
• Kyle Moore-Brown, OL/DL (2004–2008)
• Kevin Nagle, FB/LB (2008)
• Ben Nelson, WR (2008)
• Alonzo Nix, WR (2007)
• Zach Norton (2008)
• Chad Owens, WR (2008)
• Saul Patu, FB/LB (2003–2007)
• John Peaua, FB/LB (2004–2007)
• Kamau Peterson (2004)
• Derrick Pickens (2005)
• Chris Polinder (2003)
• Brad Pyatt, WR (2007–2008)
• Willie Quinnie, WR (2007–2008)
• Robert Redd, WR/DB (2004; 2007)
• Tank Reese (2005)
• Nick Rogers, DL (2008)
• Ronald "Bo" Rogers, WR/DB (2004)
• Clay Rush, K (2005–2006; 2008)
• Sunungura Rusununguko (2004)
• Lauvale Sape, DL (2008)
• Tony Scott (2004; 2006)
• Bryant Shaw, OL/DL (2003–2005)
• Darnell Small (2003)
• Chris Snyder, OL/DL (2007)
• Dwayne Stukes, WR/DB (2004)
• John Syptak, DL (2008)
• Charrod Taylor, DL (2008)
• Robert Thomas, FB/LB (2007–2008)
• Jabir Walker (2005)
• Chris Watton, OL/DL (2005–2008)
• Seante Williams, OL/DL (2006)
• Wendall Williams, WR (2008)
• Thal Woods, WR/DB (2003–2004)
• Deric Yaussi, K (2008)
• Rich Young, FB/LB (2004–2006)
