= 2008 Colorado Crush season =

Arena Football League team season

- Head coach: Mike Dailey
- Home stadium: Pepsi Center

Results
- Record: 6–10
- Division place: 3rd
- Playoffs: Won Wild Card Playoffs (Blaze) 49–44; Lost Divisional Playoffs (SaberCats) 51–64

The 2008 Colorado Crush season is the sixth season for the franchise. The Crush finished the regular season with a 6–10 record, good enough for the playoffs as the 5th seed in the American Conference. In the Wild Card round, they defeated division rival Utah Blaze, 49–44. In the Divisional round, they were defeated by the defending champions, the San Jose SaberCats, 51–64.

== Standings ==
Central Division
| Team | W | L | PCT | PF | PA | DIV | CON | Home | Away |
|---|---|---|---|---|---|---|---|---|---|
| z-Chicago Rush | 11 | 5 | .688 | 926 | 765 | 6–0 | 9–1 | 7–1 | 4–4 |
| x-Colorado Crush | 6 | 10 | .375 | 847 | 907 | 2–4 | 4–6 | 4–4 | 2–6 |
| x-Grand Rapids Rampage | 6 | 10 | .375 | 952 | 968 | 3–3 | 4–6 | 3–5 | 3–5 |
| Kansas City Brigade | 3 | 13 | .188 | 752 | 923 | 1–5 | 1–9 | 2–6 | 1–7 |

z - Clinched division and conference's best record
x - Clinched playoff berth

== Regular season schedule ==
| Week | Date | Opponent | Result | Record | Location | Attendance | Recap |
|---|---|---|---|---|---|---|---|
| 1 | March 2 | Columbus Destroyers | W 50–47 | 1–0 | Pepsi Center | 9,265 | Recap |
| 2 | Bye Week | | | | | | |
| 3 | March 17 | at Dallas Desperados | L 40–51 | 1–1 | American Airlines Center | 12,576 | Recap |
| 4 | March 22 | at Chicago Rush | L 35–70 | 1–2 | Allstate Arena | 16,036 | Recap |
| 5 | March 30 | New Orleans VooDoo | L 51–54 | 1–3 | Pepsi Center | 10,350 | Recap |
| 6 | April 4 | Los Angeles Avengers | W 67–54 | 2–3 | Pepsi Center | 11,159 | Recap |
| 7 | April 11 | at Cleveland Gladiators | W 69–66 | 3–3 | Quicken Loans Arena | 15,079 | Recap |
| 8 | April 19 | at Kansas City Brigade | L 53–55 | 3–4 | Sprint Center | 14,057 | Recap |
| 9 | April 25 | Chicago Rush | L 52–65 | 3–5 | Pepsi Center | 11,114 | Recap |
| 10 | May 2 | Grand Rapids Rampage | W 63–28 | 4–5 | Pepsi Center | 14,527 | Recap |
| 11 | May 10 | at Utah Blaze | L 36–71 | 4–6 | EnergySolutions Arena | 13,787 | Recap |
| 12 | May 17 | Cleveland Gladiators | L 46–50 | 4–7 | Pepsi Center | 11,214 | Recap |
| 13 | May 24 | at San Jose SaberCats | L 42–59 | 4–8 | HP Pavilion | 13,147 | Recap |
| 14 | June 2 | New York Dragons | L 65–73 | 4–9 | Pepsi Center | 14,078 | Recap |
| 15 | June 7 | at Grand Rapids Rampage | L 65–84 | 4–10 | Van Andel Arena | 7,766 | Recap |
| 16 | June 16 | at Arizona Rattlers | W 62–55 | 5–10 | US Airways Center | 11,608 | Recap |
| 17 | June 21 | Kansas City Brigade | W 51–27 | 6–10 | Pepsi Center | 13,571 | Recap |

== Playoff schedule ==
| Round | Date | Opponent (seed) | Result | Location | Attendance | Recap |
|---|---|---|---|---|---|---|
| AC Wild Card | June 28 | at Utah Blaze (4) | W 49–44 | EnergySolutions Arena | 10,073 | Recap |
| AC Divisional | July 5 | at San Jose SaberCats (2) | L 51–64 | HP Pavilion | 12,479 | Recap |

== Final roster ==
2008 Colorado Crush roster
| Quarterbacks: 17 Jon Beutjer; 8 John Dutton; Fullbacks: 44 Robert Thomas; Wide receivers: 23 Anthony Merritt; 81 Ben Nelson; 81 Willie Quinnie; 15 Wendall Williams | Offensive linemen: 66 Joey Hollenbeck; 77 Brett Huyser; 96 Kyle Moore-Brown; 67 Chris Watton; Defensive linemen: 91 Aaron McConnell; 94 Nick Rogers; 97 Lauvale Sape; 59 John Syptak; 98 Charrod Taylor | Linebackers: 11 Kevin Nagle; Defensive backs: 21 Dion Byrum; 4 Rashad Floyd; 25 Jason Harmon; 2 Delvin Hughley; 20 Antonio Malone; Kickers: 10 Deric Yaussi | Injury reserve: 13 Aaron Hosack WR (IR); 5 Brandon Kirsch QB (IR); 9 Chad Owens WR (IR); 6 Brad Pyatt WR (IR); 3 Clay Rush K (IR); Refused to report: currently vacant; Other league exempt: currently vacant; Suspension: currently vacant; rookies in italics Roster updated July 29, 2010; 23 Active, 5 Inactive → More rosters |

== Regular season ==
=== Week 1: vs. Columbus Destroyers ===
| Quarter | 1 | 2 | 3 | 4 | Total |
|---|---|---|---|---|---|
| CLB | 14 | 7 | 19 | 7 | 47 |
| COL | 14 | 10 | 13 | 13 | 50 |

at Pepsi Center, Denver, Colorado

- Date: March 2
- Game time: 4:00 PM EST
- Game attendance: 9,265

Game information

1st Quarter:

- 08:53 COL – Willie Quinnie 12 yd pass from John Dutton (Clay Rush kick) – 7–0 COL
- 06:01 CLB – Derek Lee 7 yd pass from Matt Nagy (Mark Lewis kick) – 7–7
- 04:39 COL – Ben Nelson 22 yd pass from John Dutton (Clay Rush kick) – 14–7 COL
- 01:34 CLB – Derek Lee 14 yd pass from Matt Nagy (Mark Lewis kick) – 14–14

2nd Quarter:

- 06:45 COL – Clay Rush 54 yd field goal – 17–14 COL
- 00:51 CLB – Harold Wells 2 yd run (Mark Lewis kick) – 21–17 CLB
- 00:04 COL – Ben Nelson 2 yd pass from John Dutton (Clay Rush kick) – 24–21 COL

3rd Quarter:

- 12:55 CLB – Rasheed Marshall 33 yd pass from Matt Nagy (Mark Lewis kick failed) – 27–24 CLB
- 11:10 COL – Willie Quinnie 11 yd pass from John Dutton (Clay Rush kick failed) – 30–27 COL
- 05:26 CLB – Calvin Russell 4 yd run (Mark Lewis kick failed) – 33–30 CLB
- 02:32 COL – Ben Nelson 7 yd pass from John Dutton (Clay Rush kick) – 37–33 COL
- 00:45 CLB – Harold Wells 1 yd run (Mark Lewis kick) – 40–37 CLB

4th Quarter:

- 11:48 COL – Willie Quinnie 3 yd pass from John Dutton (Clay Rush kick failed) – 43–40 COL
- 03:27 COL – Jason Harmon 3 yd run (Clay Rush kick) – 50–40 COL
- 00:34 CLB – Derek Lee 4 yd pass from Matt Nagy (Mark Lewis kick) – 50–47 COL
- Officials: Referee: Dave Lambros; Umpire: Doug Wilson; Linesman: Kelly Saalfield; Line judge: Brian Matthew; Back judge: Rich Wilborn
- Offensive Player of the Game: N/A
- Defensive Player of the Game: N/A
- Ironman Player of the Game: N/A

=== Week 2 ===
Bye Week

=== Week 3: at Dallas Desperados ===
| Quarter | 1 | 2 | 3 | 4 | Total |
|---|---|---|---|---|---|
| COL | 14 | 6 | 6 | 14 | 40 |
| DAL | 7 | 10 | 20 | 14 | 51 |

at American Airlines Center, Dallas, Texas

- Date: March 17
- Game time: 8:00 PM EST
- Game attendance: 12,576

Game information

1st Quarter:

- 12:46 COL – NELSON, Ben 8 yd pass from DUTTON, Johnn (RUSH, Clay kick) – 7–0 COL
- 08:10 DAL – WHITE, Josh 2 yd run (HAMILTON, Remy kick) – 7–7
- 03:50 COL – THOMAS, Robert 1 yd run (RUSH, Clay kick) – 14–7 COL

2nd Quarter:

- 12:33 DAL – SANDERS, Chris 2 yd run (HAMILTON, Remy kick) – 14–14
- 07:25 DAL – HAMILTON, Remy 25 yd field goal – 17–14 DAL
- 05:10 COL – PYATT, Brad 15 yd pass from DUTTON, Johnn (RUSH, Clay kick failed) – 20–17 COL

3rd Quarter:

- 12:00 DAL – PETTIS, Will 14 yd pass from SANDERS, Chris (HAMILTON, Remy kick) – 24–20 DAL
- 09:03 COL – NELSON, Ben 5 yd pass from DUTTON, Johnn (RUSH, Clay kick failed) – 26–24 COL
- 07:49 DAL – PETTIS, Will 37 yd pass from SANDERS, Chris (HAMILTON, Remy kick failed) – 30–26 DAL
- 04:18 DAL – PETTIS, Will 7 yd pass from SANDERS, Chris (HAMILTON, Remy kick) – 36–37 DAL

4th Quarter:

- 13:05 DAL – PETTIS, Will 10 yd pass from SANDERS, Chris (HAMILTON, Remy kick) – 44–26 DAL
- 09:26 COL – NELSON, Ben 4 yd pass from DUTTON, Johnn (RUSH, Clay kick failed) – 44–32 DAL
- 01:32 DAL – SANDERS, Chris 2 yd run (HAMILTON, Remy kick) – 51–32 DAL
- 00:31 COL – QUINNIE, Willie 8 yd pass from KIRSCH, Brandon (QUINNIE, Willie pass from KIRSCH, Brandon) – 51–40 DAL
- Officials: Referee: Pat Garvey; Umpire: Paul King; Linesman: Bill Ward; Line judge: Bob McElwee; Back judge: James DeBell
- Offensive Player of the Game: Chris Sanders (DAL)
- Defensive Player of the Game: Bobby Perry (DAL)
- Ironman Player of the Game: Will Pettis (DAL)

=== Week 4: at Chicago Rush ===
| Quarter | 1 | 2 | 3 | 4 | Total |
|---|---|---|---|---|---|
| COL | 7 | 21 | 7 | 0 | 35 |
| CHI | 13 | 27 | 9 | 21 | 70 |

at Allstate Arena, Rosemont, Illinois

- Date: March 22
- Game time: 8:00 PM EST
- Game attendance: 16,036

Game information

1st Quarter:

- 10:46 CHI – MORGAN 5 Yd Pass From BONNER (FRANTZ kick Failed) – 6–0 CHI
- 08:56 COL – QUINNIE 28 Yd Pass From DUTTON (RUSH Kick) – 7–6 COL
- 04:24 CHI – MICHNA 1 Yd Run (FRANTZ kick) – 13–7 CHI

2nd Quarter:

- 09:36 CHI – MICHNA 2 Yd Run (FRANTZ kick) – 20–7 CHI
- 06:44 COL – THOMAS 9 Yd Pass From DUTTON (RUSH kick) – 20–14 CHI
- 04:43 CHI – HARRELL 23 Yd Pass From BONNER (FRANTZ kick) – 27–14 CHI
- 01:06 COL – PYATT 2 Yd Pass From THOMAS (RUSH kick) – 27–21 CHI
- 00:54 CHI – HARRELL 7 Yd Pass From BONNER (FRANTZ kick failed) – 33–21 CHI
- 00:39 COL – PYATT 26 Yd Pass From DUTTON (RUSH kick) – 33–28 CHI
- 00:26 CHI – ALEXANDER 10 yd run (FRANTZ kick) – 40–28 CHI

3rd Quarter:

- 12:08 COL – QUINNIE 10 Yd Pass From DUTTON (RUSH kick) – 40–35 CHI
- 07:16 CHI – HARRELL 45 yd Pass from MICHNA (FRANTZ kick) – 47–35 CHI
- 03:50 CHI – Ball Through End Zone – 49–35 CHI

4th Quarter:

- 13:31 CHI – PETERS 2 Yd Pass From MICHNA (FRANTZ kick) – 56–35 CHI
- 07:01 CHI – LATENDREESE 10 Yd Pass From BONNER (FRANTZ kick) – 63–35 CHI
- 01:54 CHI – ALFONZO 8 Yd Pass From MICHNA (FRANTZ kick) – 70–35 CHI
- Officials: Referee: Riley Johnson; Umpire: Paul Frerking; Linesman: Julian Mapp; Line judge: RG Detillier; Back judge: Bud McCleskey
- Offensive Player of the Game: N/A
- Defensive Player of the Game: N/A
- Ironman Player of the Game: N/A

=== Week 5: vs. New Orleans VooDoo ===
| Quarter | 1 | 2 | 3 | 4 | Total |
|---|---|---|---|---|---|
| NO | 6 | 21 | 14 | 13 | 54 |
| COL | 10 | 14 | 14 | 13 | 51 |

at Pepsi Center, Denver, Colorado

- Date: March 30
- Game time: 4:00 PM EST
- Game attendance: 10,350

Game information

1st Quarter:

- 11:42 NO – James Jordan 4 yd pass from Danny Wimprine (Alexandre Romero kick failed) – 6–0 NO
- 04:58 COL – Clay Rush 27 yd field goal – 6–3 NO
- 00:48 COL – Willie Quinnie 22 yd pass from John Dutton (Clay Rush kick) – 10–6 COL

2nd Quarter:

- 13:21 NO – Isaiah Ross 3 yd pass from Danny Wimprine (Alexandre Romero kick) – 13–10 NO
- 10:21 COL – Ben Nelson 4 yd pass from John Dutton (Clay Rush kick) – 17–13 COL
- 05:00 NO – James Jordan 4 yd pass from Danny Wimprine (Alexandre Romero kick) – 20–17 NO
- 00:50 COL – Ben Nelson 5 yd pass from John Dutton (Clay Rush kick) – 24–20 COL
- 00:45 NO – Tyronne Jones 13 yd pass from Danny Wimprine (Alexandre Romero kick) – 27–24 NO

3rd Quarter:

- 12:06 COL – Brad Pyatt 14 yd pass from John Dutton (Clay Rush kick) – 31–27 COL
- 09:07 NO – James Jordan 32 yd pass from Danny Wimprine (Alexandre Romero kick) – 34–31 NO
- 04:38 COL – Brad Pyatt 8 yd pass from John Dutton (Clay Rush kick) – 38–34 COL
- 00:36 NO – James Lynch 3 yd run (Alexandre Romero kick) – 41–38 NO

4th Quarter:

- 11:28 COL – Ben Nelson 6 yd pass from John Dutton (Clay Rush kick) – 45–41 COL
- 05:50 NO – James Jordan 3 yd pass from Danny Wimprine (Alexandre Romero kick failed) – 47–45 NO
- 02:57 COL – Brad Pyatt 8 yd pass from John Dutton (Jason Harmon rush failed) – 51–47 COL
- 00:36 NO – Danny Wimprine 1 yd run (Alexandre Romero kick) – 54–51 NO
- Officials: Referee: Bill LeMonnier; Umpire: Jeff Carr; Linesman: Greg Shields; Line judge: Dave Chesney; Back judge: Billy Beckett
- Offensive Player of the Game: Danny Wimprine (NO)
- Defensive Player of the Game: Lin-J Shell (NO)
- Ironman Player of the Game: Tyronne Jones (NO)

=== Week 6: vs. Los Angeles Avengers ===
| Quarter | 1 | 2 | 3 | 4 | Total |
|---|---|---|---|---|---|
| LA | 20 | 14 | 7 | 13 | 54 |
| COL | 14 | 14 | 20 | 19 | 67 |

at Pepsi Center, Denver, Colorado

- Date: April 4
- Game time: 9:00 PM EST
- Game attendance: 11,159

Game information

1st Quarter:

- 14:55 LA – PARKER 2 yd net recovery (DAVIS kick failed) – 6–0 LA
- 08:59 COL – THOMAS 2 yd run (RUSH kick) – 7–6 COL
- 07:19 LA – WARD 25 yd pass from T. HICKS (DAVIS kick) – 13–7 LA
- 05:48 COL – QUINNIE 9 yd pass from DUTTON (RUSH kick) – 14–13 COL
- 02:58 LA – INGRAM 28 yd pass from T. HICKS (DAVIS kick) – 20–14 LA

2nd Quarter:

- 13:29 COL – PYATT 5 yd pass from DUTTON (RUSH kick) – 21–20 COL
- 09:07 LA – INGRAM 9 yd pass from T. HICKS (DAVIS kick) – 27–21 LA
- 00:31 LA – INGRAM 44 yd pass from T. HICKS (DAVIS kick) – 34–21 LA
- 00:11 COL – NELSON 4 yd pass from DUTTON (RUSH kick) – 34–28 LA

3rd Quarter:

- 10:52 COL – NELSON 37 yd pass from DUTTON (RUSH kick) – 35–34 COL
- 05:22 COL – NELSON 5 yd pass from DUTTON (RUSH kick failed) – 41–34 COL
- 03:07 LA – MARSHALL 45 yd pass from T. HICKS (DAVIS kick) – 41–41
- 01:36 COL – NELSON 37 yd pass from DUTTON (RUSH kick) – 48–41 COL

4th Quarter:

- 10:39 COL – WATTON 6 yd pass from DUTTON (RUSH kick) – 55–41 COL
- 08:23 COL – DUTTON 4 yd run (RUSH kick failed) – 61–41 COL
- 05:58 LA – FORD 1 yd run (DAVIS kick failed) – 61–47 COL
- 03:05 LA – HICKMAN 50 yd interception return (DAVIS kick) – 61–54 COL
- 01:24 COL – NELSON 9 yd pass from DUTTON (RUSH kick failed) – 67–54 COL
- Officials: Referee: Tom McCabe; Umpire: Rick Podraza; Linesman: Rod Pearson; Line judge: Dana McKenzie; Back judge: Scott Helverson
- Offensive Player of the Game: N/A
- Defensive Player of the Game: N/A
- Ironman Player of the Game: N/A

=== Week 7: at Cleveland Gladiators ===
| Quarter | 1 | 2 | 3 | 4 | Total |
|---|---|---|---|---|---|
| COL | 7 | 24 | 21 | 17 | 69 |
| CLE | 17 | 21 | 14 | 14 | 66 |

at Quicken Loans Arena, Cleveland, Ohio

- Date: April 11
- Game time: 7:00 PM EST
- Game attendance: 15,079

Game information

1st Quarter:

- 12:56 CLE – AMEY 13 yd pass from PHILYAW (BALL kick) – 7–0 CLE
- 07:20 CLE – AMEY 13 yd pass from PHILYAW (BALL kick) – 14–0 CLE
- 05:03 COL – QUINNIE 23 yd pass from DUTTON (RUSH kick) – 14–7 CLE
- 02:11 CLE – BALL 18 yd field goal – 17–7 CLE

2nd Quarter:

- 14:55 COL – NELSON 16 yd pass from DUTTON (RUSH kick) – 17–14 CLE
- 11:13 CLE – JACKSON 3 yd run (BALL kick) – 24–14 CLE
- 08:08 COL – PYATT 6 yd pass from DUTTON (RUSH kick) – 24–21 CLE
- 01:16 CLE – AMEY 6 yd pass from PHILYAW (BALL kick) – 31–21 CLE
- 00:51 COL – QUINNIE 7 yd pass from DUTTON (RUSH kick) – 31–28 CLE
- 00:37 CLE – AMEY 8 yd pass from PHILYAW (BALL kick) – 38–28 CLE
- 00:00 COL – RUSH 21 yd field goal – 38–31 CLE

3rd Quarter:

- 13:06 COL – DUTTON 4 yd run (RUSH kick) – 38–38
- 10:29 CLE – JACKSON 2 yd run (BALL kick) – 45–38 CLE
- 08:01 COL – QUINNIE 10 yd pass from DUTTON (RUSH kick) – 45–45
- 05:19 CLE – AMEY 9 yd pass from PHILYAW (BALL kick) – 52–45 CLE
- 02:50 COL – NELSON 8 yd pass from DUTTON (RUSH kick) – 52–52

4th Quarter:

- 08:59 COL – PYATT 10 yd pass from DUTTON (RUSH kick) – 59–52 COL
- 02:01 COL – RUSH 34 yd field goal – 62–52 COL
- 01:01 CLE – REDD 11 yd pass from PHILYAW (BALL kick) – 62–59 COL
- 00:44 COL – QUINNIE 5 yd pass from DUTTON (RUSH kick) – 69–59 COL
- 00:27 CLE – AMEY 3 yd pass from PHILYAW (BALL kick) – 69–66 COL
- Officials: Referee: Dave Lambros; Umpire: Doug Wilson; Linesman: Kelly Sallfeld; Line judge: Brian Matthew; Back judge: Rich Wilborn
- Offensive Player of the Game: Otis Amey (CLE)
- Defensive Player of the Game: Rashad Floyd (COL)
- Ironman Player of the Game: N/A

=== Week 8: at Kansas City Brigade ===
| Quarter | 1 | 2 | 3 | 4 | Total |
|---|---|---|---|---|---|
| COL | 19 | 6 | 16 | 12 | 53 |
| KC | 14 | 14 | 13 | 14 | 55 |

at Sprint Center, Kansas City, Missouri

- Date: April 19
- Game time: 6:00 PM EST
- Game attendance: 14,057

Game information

1st Quarter:

- 11:18 KC – Mike Horacek 23 yd pass from D. Bryant (Peter Martinez kick) – 7–0 KC
- 08:22 COL – Robert Thomas 1 yd run (Clay Rush kick) – 7–7
- 06:19 COL – Willie Quinnie 7 yd pass from John Dutton (Clay Rush kick failed) – 13–7 COL
- 05:21 KC – Will Holder 54 yd kickoff return (Peter Martinez kick) – 14–13 KC
- 02:23 COL – Chad Owens 2 yd run (John Dutton rush fumbld) – 19–14 COL

2nd Quarter:

- 13:51 KC – Charles Frederick 12 yd pass from D. Bryant (Peter Martinez kick) – 21–19 KC
- 09:33 KC – Jerel Myers 19 yd pass from D. Bryant (Peter Martinez kick) – 28–19 KC
- 06:30 COL – Ben Nelson 12 yd pass from John Dutton (John Dutton pass failed) – 28–25 KC

3rd Quarter:

- 10:36 COL – Chad Owens 2 yd run (Ben Nelson pass from DUTTON) – 33–28 COL
- 07:47 KC – Dawan Moss 11 yd run (Peter Martinez kick failed) – 34–33 KC
- 04:17 COL – Ben Nelson 6 yd pass from John Dutton (Chris Watton pass from DUTTON) – 41–34 COL
- 00:28 KC – Mike Horacek 6 yd run (Peter Martinez kick) – 41–41

4th Quarter:

- 14:33 COL – Willie Quinnie 11 yd pass from John Dutton (John Dutton rush failed) – 47–41 COL
- 09:01 KC – D. Bryant 8 yd run (Peter Martinez kick) – 48–47 KC
- 00:42 KC – Mike Horacek 47 yd pass from D. Bryant (Peter Martinez kick) – 55–47 KC
- 00:17 COL – Brad Pyatt 17 yd pass from John Dutton (John Dutton pass failed) – 55–53 KC
- Officials: Referee: Dennis Lipski; Umpire: Rick Nelson; Linesman: Brent Durbin; Line judge: Darrel Leftwich; Back judge: Reggie Smith
- Offensive Player of the Game: Mike Horacek (KC)
- Defensive Player of the Game: Robb Butler (KC)
- Ironman Player of the Game: Will Holder (KC)

=== Week 9: vs. Chicago Rush ===
| Quarter | 1 | 2 | 3 | 4 | Total |
|---|---|---|---|---|---|
| CHI | 7 | 21 | 17 | 20 | 65 |
| COL | 7 | 14 | 6 | 25 | 52 |

at Pepsi Center, Denver, Colorado

- Date: April 25
- Game time: 9:00 PM EST
- Game attendance: 11,114

Game information

1st Quarter:

- 06:30 COL – OWENS 4 yd run (RUSH kick) – 7–0 COL
- 02:12 CHI – MOYER 1 yd run (FRANTZ kick) – 7–7

2nd Quarter:

- 12:16 COL – OWENS 23 yd pass from DUTTON (RUSH kick) – 14–7 COL
- 09:34 CHI – ALEXANDER 15 yd pass from MICHNA (FRANTZ kick) – 14–14
- 06:19 COL – PYATT 19 yd pass from DUTTON (RUSH kick) – 21–14 COL
- 05:30 CHI – ALFONZO 11 yd kickoff return (FRANTZ kick) – 21–21
- 00:06 CHI – MICHNA 1 yd run (FRANTZ kick) – 28–21 CHI

3rd Quarter:

- 13:59 CHI – HARRELL 4 yd pass from MICHNA (FRANTZ kick) – 35–21 CHI
- 11:07 CHI – MORGAN 4 yd pass from MICHNA (FRANTZ kick) – 42–21 CHI
- 07:42 COL – QUINNIE 9 yd pass from DUTTON (RUSH kick failed) – 42–27 CHI
- 03:59 CHI – FRANTZ 34 yd field goal – 45–27 CHI

4th Quarter:

- 13:39 CHI – HARRELL 9 yd pass from MICHNA (FRANTZ kick) – 52–27 CHI
- 12:11 COL – PYATT 42 yd pass from DUTTON (RUSH kick failed) – 52–33 CHI
- 06:54 COL – OWENS 10 yd pass from DUTTON (RUSH kick failed) – 52–39 CHI
- 05:58 CHI – MORGAN 23 yd pass from MICHNA (FRANTZ kick) – 59–39 CHI
- 02:38 COL – QUINNIE 23 yd pass from DUTTON (RUSH kick) – 59–46 CHI
- 00:51 CHI – LATENDRESSE 17 yd pass from MICHNA (FRANTZ kick blocked) – 65–46 CHI
- 00:17 COL – QUINNIE 5 yd pass from DUTTON (DUTTON drop-kick failed) – 65–52 CHI
- Officials: Referee: Bill McCabe; Umpire: Paul Frerking; Linesman: Shawn Hochuli; Line judge: Dirk Bell; Back judge: Jimmy Buchanan
- Offensive Player of the Game: N/A
- Defensive Player of the Game: N/A
- Ironman Player of the Game: N/A

=== Week 10: vs. Grand Rapids Rampage ===
| Quarter | 1 | 2 | 3 | 4 | Total |
|---|---|---|---|---|---|
| GR | 7 | 14 | 7 | 0 | 28 |
| COL | 14 | 28 | 14 | 7 | 63 |

at Pepsi Center, Denver, Colorado

- Date: May 2
- Game time: 9:00 PM EST
- Game attendance: 14,527

Game information

1st Quarter:

- 10:40 COL – PYATT 4 yd pass from DUTTON (YAUSSI kick) – 7–0 COL
- 08:06 GR – HIGGINS 24 yd pass from MACPHERSON (GOWINS kick) – 7–7
- 03:04 COL – WATTON 1 yd run (YAUSSI kick) – 14–7 COL

2nd Quarter:

- 13:39 GR – JOHNSON 13 yd pass from MACPHERSON (GOWINS kick) – 14–14
- 07:51 COL – HOSACK 9 yd pass from DUTTON (YAUSSI kick) – 21–14 COL
- 02:59 COL – HOSACK 9 yd pass from DUTTON (YAUSSI kick) – 28–14 COL
- 00:37 GR – BROWDEN 6 yd run (GOWINS kick) – 28–21 COL
- 00:13 COL – OWENS 4 yd run (YAUSSI kick) – 35–21 COL
- 00:02 COL – SAPE 3 yd fumble recovery (YAUSSI kick) – 42–21 COL

3rd Quarter:

- 06:32 COL – HOSACK 8 yd pass from DUTTON (YAUSSI kick) – 49–21 COL
- 04:12 COL – ROGERS 0 yd fumble recovery (YAUSSI kick) – 56–21 COL
- 01:56 GR – HIGGINS 14 yd pass from MACPHERSON (GOWINS kick) – 56–28 COL

4th Quarter:

- 14:57 COL – HOSACK 11 yd pass from DUTTON (YAUSSI kick) – 63–28 COL
- Officials: Referee: Riley Johnson; Umpire: Wes Fritz; Linesman: Neil Brunner; Line judge: Paul Engelberts; Back judge: Tony Lombardo
- Offensive Player of the Game: N/A
- Defensive Player of the Game: N/A
- Ironman Player of the Game: N/A

=== Week 11: at Utah Blaze ===
| Quarter | 1 | 2 | 3 | 4 | Total |
|---|---|---|---|---|---|
| COL | 7 | 7 | 15 | 7 | 36 |
| UTA | 10 | 20 | 6 | 35 | 71 |

at EnergySolutions Arena, Salt Lake City, Utah

- Date: May 10
- Game time: 9:00 PM EST
- Game attendance: 13,787

Game information

1st Quarter:

- 08:25 UTA – JJ McKelvey 3 yd pass from Joe Germaine (Steve Videtich kick) – 7–0 UTA
- 06:30 COL – Willie Quinnie 28 yd pass from John Dutton (Deric Yaussi kick) – 7–7
- 01:05 UTA – Steve Videtich 21 yd field goal – 10–7 UTA

2nd Quarter:

- 13:05 COL – Aaron Hosack 6 yd pass from John Dutton (Deric Yaussi kick) – 14–10 COL
- 08:33 UTA – JJ McKelvey 7 yd pass from Joe Germaine (Steve Videtich kick failed) – 16–14 UTA
- 04:38 UTA – Huey Whittaker 8 yd pass from Joe Germaine (Steve Videtich kick) – 23–14 UTA
- 00:45 UTA – Rodney Filer 6 yd run (Steve Videtich kick) – 30–14 UTA

3rd Quarter:

- 12:25 COL – Chad Owens 23 yd pass from John Dutton (Aaron Hosack pass from DUTTON) – 30–22 UTA
- 06:57 UTA – Rodney Filer 7 yd pass from Joe Germaine (Steve Videtich kick failed) – 36–22 UTA
- 01:40 COL – Chad Owens 1 yd run (Deric Yaussi kick) – 36–29 UTA

4th Quarter:

- 14:11 UTA – Aaron Boone 9 yd pass from Joe Germaine (Steve Videtich kick) – 43–29 UTA
- 07:45 UTA – Reggie Doster 48 yd fumble recovery (Steve Videtich kick) – 50–29 UTA
- 03:40 UTA – JJ McKelvey 12 yd pass from Joe Germaine (Steve Videtich kick) – 57–29 UTA
- 01:58 COL – Willie Quinnie 16 yd pass from John Dutton (Deric Yaussi kick) – 57–36 UTA
- 00:52 UTA – JJ McKelvey 18 yd pass from Jason Gesser (Steve Videtich kick) – 64–36 UTA
- 00:44 UTA – Kelvin Morris 14 yd fumble recovery (Steve Videtich kick) – 71–36 UTA
- Officials: Referee: Pat Garvey; Umpire: Paul King; Linesman: Bill Ward; Line judge: Bob McElwee; Back judge: James DeBell
- Offensive Player of the Game: J. J. McKelvey (UTA)
- Defensive Player of the Game: Reggie Doster (UTA)
- Ironman Player of the Game: J'Sharlon Jones (UTA)

=== Week 12: vs. Cleveland Gladiators ===
| Quarter | 1 | 2 | 3 | 4 | Total |
|---|---|---|---|---|---|
| CLE | 7 | 20 | 7 | 16 | 50 |
| COL | 7 | 17 | 7 | 15 | 46 |

at Pepsi Center, Denver, Colorado

- Date: May 17
- Game time: 8:00 PM EST
- Game attendance: 11,214

Game information

1st Quarter:

- 08:09 COL – Chad Owens 1 yd run (Deric Yaussi kick) – 7–0 COL
- 04:37 CLE – Otis Amey 5 yd pass from Raymond Philyaw (Jason Ball kick) – 7–7

2nd Quarter:

- 13:08 COL – Deric Yaussi 25 yd field goal – 10–7 COL
- 11:12 CLE – Otis Amey 34 yd pass from Raymond Philyaw (Jason Ball kick) – 14–10 CLE
- 09:09 COL – Ben Nelson 6 yd pass from John Dutton (Deric Yaussi kick) – 17–14 COL
- 03:10 CLE – Robert Redd 11 yd pass from Raymond Philyaw (Jason Ball kick failed) – 20–17 CLE
- 00:40 COL – Ben Nelson 11 yd pass from John Dutton (Deric Yaussi kick) – 24–20 COL
- 00:04 CLE – Marlion Jackson 1 yd run (Jason Ball kick) – 27–24 CLE

3rd Quarter:

- 10:19 CLE – Otis Amey 17 yd pass from Raymond Philyaw (Jason Ball kick) – 34–24 CLE
- 07:21 COL – Aaron Hosack 12 yd pass from John Dutton (Deric Yaussi kick) – 34–31 CLE

4th Quarter:

- 10:00 CLE – Jason Ball 22 yd field goal – 37–31 CLE
- 08:26 COL – Ben Nelson 6 yd pass from John Dutton (Deric Yaussi kick) – 38–37 COL
- 04:06 CLE – Willis Marshall 8 yd pass from Raymond Philyaw (Raymond Philyaw pass failed) – 43–38 CLE
- 00:28 CLE – Otis Amey 23 yd pass from Raymond Philyaw (Jason Ball kick) – 50–38 CLE
- 00:00 COL – Willie Quinnie 7 yd pass from John Dutton (Aaron Hosack pass from DUTTON) – 50–46 CLE
- Officials: Referee: Bill Athan; Umpire: Matt Jordan; Linesman: Allen Baynes; Line judge: Rusty Baynes; Back judge: Greg Wilson
- Offensive Player of the Game: N/A
- Defensive Player of the Game: N/A
- Ironman Player of the Game: N/A

=== Week 13: at San Jose SaberCats ===
| Quarter | 1 | 2 | 3 | 4 | Total |
|---|---|---|---|---|---|
| COL | 14 | 14 | 7 | 7 | 42 |
| SJ | 14 | 21 | 7 | 17 | 59 |

at HP Pavilion at San Jose, San Jose, California

- Date: May 24
- Game time: 10:30 PM EST
- Game attendance: 13,147

Game information

1st Quarter:

- 14:20 COL – OWENS, Chad 40 yd pass from DUTTON, John (YAUSSI, Deric kick) – 7–0 COL
- 06:04 SJ – ROE, James 4 yd pass from GRIEB, Mark (HAGLUND, A.J. kick) – 7–7
- 02:57 COL – NELSON, Ben 17 yd pass from DUTTON, John (YAUSSI, Deric kick) – 14–7 COL
- 01:36 SJ – SAINTIL, Cleann 6 yd pass from GRIEB, Mark (HAGLUND, A.J. kick) – 14–14

2nd Quarter:

- 11:30 SJ – SAINTIL, Cleann 8 yd pass from GRIEB, Mark (HAGLUND, A.J. kick) – 21–14 SJ
- 06:19 SJ – WRIGHT, Rodney 31 yd pass from GRIEB, Mark (HAGLUND, A.J. kick) – 28–14 SJ
- 02:09 COL – NELSON, Ben 3 yd pass from DUTTON, John (YAUSSI, Deric kick) – 28–21 SJ
- 00:03 SJ – WRIGHT, Rodney 7 yd pass from GRIEB, Mark (HAGLUND, A.J. kick) – 35–21 SJ
- 00:00 COL – HOSACK, Aaron 2 yd pass from DUTTON, John (YAUSSI, Deric kick) – 35–28 SJ

3rd Quarter:

- 13:54 SJ – ROE, James 23 yd pass from GRIEB, Mark (HAGLUND, A.J. kick) – 42–28 SJ
- 05:22 COL – QUINNIE, Willie 4 yd pass from DUTTON, John (YAUSSI, Deric kick) – 42–35 SJ

4th Quarter:

- 08:33 SJ – HAGLUND, A.J. 19 yd field goal – 45–35 SJ
- 07:32 COL – QUINNIE, Willie 34 yd pass from DUTTON, John (YAUSSI, Deric kick) – 45–42 SJ
- 06:05 SJ – SAINTIL, Cleann 35 yd pass from GRIEB, Mark (HAGLUND, A.J. kick) – 52–42 SJ
- 01:59 SJ – ROE, James 9 yd pass from GRIEB, Mark (HAGLUND, A.J. kick) – 59–42 SJ
- Officials: Referee: Bill McCabe; Umpire: Mike Delaney; Linesman: Mike McCabe; Line judge: Dirk Bell; Back judge: Jimmy Buchanan
- Offensive Player of the Game: Mark Grieb (SJ)
- Defensive Player of the Game: Clevan Thomas (SJ)
- Ironman Player of the Game: Rodney Wright (SJ)

=== Week 14: vs. New York Dragons ===
| Quarter | 1 | 2 | 3 | 4 | Total |
|---|---|---|---|---|---|
| NY | 21 | 17 | 14 | 21 | 73 |
| COL | 7 | 24 | 21 | 13 | 65 |

at Pepsi Center, Denver, Colorado

- Date: June 2
- Game time: 10:30 PM EST
- Game attendance: 14,078

Game information

1st Quarter:

- 12:18 NY – HENRY 2 yd run (AZAR kick) – 7–0 NY
- 11:07 COL – OWENS 22 yd pass from DUTTON (YAUSSI kick) – 7–7
- 07:22 NY – WILLIS 3 yd pass from GARCIA (AZAR kick) – 14–7 NY
- 01:07 NY – HENRY 1 yd run (AZAR kick) – 21–7 NY

2nd Quarter:

- 11:57 COL – OWENS 13 yd pass from DUTTON (YAUSSI kick) – 21–14 NY
- 09:44 NY – WILLIS 7 yd pass from GARCIA (AZAR kick) – 28–14 NY
- 07:50 COL – WATTON 20 yd pass from DUTTON (YAUSSI kick) – 28–21 NY
- 04:42 NY – AZAR 51 yd field goal – 31–21 NY
- 03:02 COL – HOSACK 10 yd pass from DUTTON (YAUSSI kick) – 31–28 NY
- 00:36 NY – WILLIS 20 yd pass from GARCIA (AZAR kick) – 38–28 NY
- 00:00 COL – YAUSSI 27 yd field goal – 38–31 NY

3rd Quarter:

- 14:47 COL – OWENS 56 yd kickoff return (YAUSSI kick) – 38–38
- 10:45 NY – HALL 10 yd pass from GARCIA (AZAR kick) – 45–38 NY
- 07:15 COL – OWENS 20 yd pass from DUTTON (YAUSSI kick) – 45–45
- 04:04 NY – WILLIS 6 yd pass from GARCIA (AZAR kick) – 52–45 NY
- 00:55 COL – NELSON 14 yd pass from DUTTON (YAUSSI kick) – 52–52

4th Quarter:

- 12:30 NY – SWAYNE 7 yd pass from GARCIA (AZAR kick) – 59–52 NY
- 06:55 NY – SWAYNE 20 yd pass from GARCIA (AZAR kick) – 66–52 NY
- 05:06 COL – OWENS 19 yd pass from DUTTON (YAUSSI kick) – 66–59 NY
- 04:05 NY – GARCIA 2 yd run (AZAR kick) – 73–59 NY
- 00:38 COL – QUINNIE 6 yd pass from DUTTON (YAUSSI kick failed) – 73–65 NY
- Officials: Referee: Dave Cutaia; Umpire: Al Granado; Linesman: Mike McCabe; Line judge: Art Lucky; Back judge: James Cole
- Offensive Player of the Game: N/A
- Defensive Player of the Game: N/A
- Ironman Player of the Game: N/A

=== Week 15: at Grand Rapids Rampage ===
| Quarter | 1 | 2 | 3 | 4 | Total |
|---|---|---|---|---|---|
| COL | 10 | 14 | 19 | 22 | 65 |
| GR | 7 | 37 | 23 | 17 | 84 |

at Van Andel Arena, Grand Rapids, Michigan

- Date: June 7
- Game time: 7:00 PM EST
- Game attendance: 7,766

Game information

1st Quarter:

- 13:05 GR – Chris Johnson 22 yd pass from James MacPherson (Brian Gowins kick) – 7–0 GR
- 08:30 COL – Deric Yaussi 22 yd field goal – 7–3 GR
- 04:17 COL – Willie Quinnie 24 yd pass from John Dutton (Deric Yaussi kick) – 10–7 COL

2nd Quarter:

- 14:56 GR – Cole Magner 11 yd pass from James MacPherson (Brian Gowins kick) – 14–10 GR
- 13:20 COL – Willie Quinnie 15 yd pass from John Dutton (Deric Yaussi kick) – 17–14 COL
- 11:04 GR – Chris Johnson 28 yd pass from James MacPherson (Brian Gowins kick) – 21–17 GR
- 09:54 GR – Donovan Arp safety – 23–17 GR
- 05:57 GR – James MacPherson 1 yd run (Brian Gowins kick) – 30–17 GR
- 03:30 COL – Willie Quinnie 8 yd pass from John Dutton (Deric Yaussi kick) – 30–24 GR
- 00:44 GR – Donovan Arp 4 yd pass from James MacPherson (Brian Gowins kick) – 37–24 GR
- 00:06 GR – Chris Johnson 7 yd pass from James MacPherson (Brian Gowins kick) – 44–24 GR

3rd Quarter:

- 13:17 COL – John Dutton 3 yd run (Deric Yaussi kick failed) – 44–30 GR
- 11:24 GR – Kenny Higgins 32 yd pass from James MacPherson (Brian Gowins kick) – 51–30 GR
- 07:55 COL – Ben Nelson 13 yd pass from John Dutton (Deric Yaussi kick) – 51–37 GR
- 07:02 GR – Kenny Higgins 10 yd pass from James MacPherson (Brian Gowins kick) – 58–37 GR
- 05:52 COL – Chad Owens 20 yd pass from John Dutton (Deric Yaussi kick failed) – 58–43 GR
- 03:58 GR – Cole Magner 5 yd pass from James MacPherson (Brian Gowins kick failed) – 64–43 GR
- 00:26 GR – Brian Gowins 39 yd field goal – 67–43 GR

4th Quarter:

- 14:52 COL – Ben Nelson 21 yd pass from John Dutton (Willie Quinnie pass from DUTTON) – 67–51 GR
- 11:08 COL – Ben Nelson 6 yd pass from John Dutton (Ben Nelson pass from YAUSSI) – 67–59 GR
- 08:41 GR – Kenny Higgins 20 yd pass from James MacPherson (Brian Gowins kick) – 74–59 GR
- 01:31 GR – Brian Gowins 39 yd field goal – 77–59 GR
- 00:54 COL – Willie Quinnie 28 yd pass from John Dutton (Deric Yaussi pass failed) – 77–65 GR
- 00:37 GR – Cole Magner 7 yd pass from James MacPherson (Brian Gowins kick) – 84–65 GR
- Officials: Referee: Dave Lambros; Umpire: Doug Wilson; Linesman: Kelly Saalfeld; Line judge: Brian Matthew; Back judge: Rich Wilborn
- Offensive Player of the Game: James MacPherson (GR)
- Defensive Player of the Game: Jermaine Lewis (GR)
- Ironman Player of the Game: Donovan Arp (GR)

=== Week 16: at Arizona Rattlers ===
| Quarter | 1 | 2 | 3 | 4 | Total |
|---|---|---|---|---|---|
| COL | 28 | 14 | 7 | 13 | 62 |
| ARZ | 7 | 13 | 8 | 27 | 55 |

at US Airways Center, Phoenix, Arizona

- Date: June 16
- Game time: 10:00 PM EST
- Game attendance: 11,608

Game information

1st Quarter:

- 13:51 COL – NELSON 6 yd pass from DUTTON (YAUSSI kick) – 7–0 COL
- 10:13 COL – DUTTON 5 yd run (YAUSSI kick) – 14–0 COL
- 07:08 ARZ – BURLEY 11 yd pass from SAUK (HOULE kick) – 14–7 COL
- 03:04 COL – QUINNIE 20 yd pass from DUTTON (YAUSSI kick) – 21–7 COL
- 01:41 COL – QUINNIE 8 yd pass from DUTTON (YAUSSI kick) – 28–7 COL

2nd Quarter:

- 14:55 COL – HARMON 17 yd fumble recovery (YAUSSI kick) – 35–7 COL
- 10:31 ARZ – BURLEY 7 yd pass from SAUK (ROBINSON rush failed) – 35–13 COL
- 00:38 ARZ – DEVOE 10 yd pass from SAUK (HOULE kick) – 35–20 COL
- 00:15 COL – NELSON 20 yd pass from DUTTON (YAUSSI kick) – 42–20 COL

3rd Quarter:

- 10:33 ARZ – HARVEY 10 yd pass from SAUK (SMOKER rush) – 42–28 COL
- 05:20 COL – HOSACK 5 yd pass from DUTTON (YAUSSI kick) – 49–28 COL

4th Quarter:

- 11:03 ARZ – HARVEY 9 yd pass from SAUK (HOULE kick) – 49–35 COL
- 07:53 COL – QUINNIE 10 yd pass from DUTTON (YAUSSI kick failed) – 55–35 COL
- 05:05 COL – FLOYD 38 yd interception return (YAUSSI kick) – 62–35 COL
- 00:51 ARZ – BURLEY 7 yd pass from SAUK (HOULE kick) – 62–42 COL
- 00:36 ARZ – GAINES 1 yd pass from SAUK (GAINES rush failed) – 62–48 COL
- 00:20 ARZ – BURLEY 3 yd pass from SAUK (HOULE kick) – 62–55 COL
- Officials: Referee: JOHNSON, Riley; Umpire: LOWE, Rick; Linesman: MAPP, Julian; Line judge: DETILLIER, RG; Back judge: MCCLESKY, Bud
- Offensive Player of the Game: John Dutton (COL)
- Defensive Player of the Game: Rashad Floyd (COL)
- Ironman Player of the Game: Aaron McConnell (COL)

=== Week 17: vs. Kansas City Brigade ===
| Quarter | 1 | 2 | 3 | 4 | Total |
|---|---|---|---|---|---|
| KC | 0 | 14 | 0 | 13 | 27 |
| COL | 14 | 16 | 7 | 14 | 51 |

at Pepsi Center, Denver, Colorado

- Date: June 21
- Game time: 8:00 PM EST
- Game attendance: 13,571

Game information

1st Quarter:

- 06:44 COL – Willie Quinnie 7 yd pass from John Dutton (Deric Yaussi kick) – 7–0 COL
- 02:51 COL – Robert Thomas 1 yd run (Deric Yaussi kick) – 14–0 COL

2nd Quarter:

- 07:03 COL – Jason Harmon 2 yd run (Deric Yaussi kick) – 21–0 COL
- 05:48 KC – Mike Horacek 47 yd pass from D. Bryant (Peter Martinez kick) – 21–7 COL
- 00:55 COL – John Dutton 1 yd run (Deric Yaussi kick failed) – 27–7 COL
- 00:39 KC – Charles Frederick 38 yd pass from D. Bryant (Peter Martinez kick) – 27–14 COL
- 00:00 COL – Deric Yaussi 26 yd field goal – 30–14 COL

3rd Quarter:

- 13:42 COL – Ben Nelson 10 yd pass from John Dutton (Deric Yaussi kick) – 37–14 COL

4th Quarter:

- 08:56 COL – Robert Thomas 3 yd run (Deric Yaussi kick) – 44–14 COL
- 04:50 KC – Jerel Myers 5 yd pass from D. Bryant (Peter Martinez kick) – 44–21 COL
- 02:22 COL – Chris Watton 18 yd pass from John Dutton (Deric Yaussi kick) – 51–21 COL
- 00:33 KC – Gillis Wilson 5 yd pass from D. Bryant (D. Bryant pass failed) – 51–27 COL
- Officials: Referee: Pat Garvey; Umpire: Paul King; Linesman: Bill Ward; Line judge: Bob McElwee; Back judge: James DeBell
- Offensive Player of the Game: N/A
- Defensive Player of the Game: N/A
- Ironman Player of the Game: N/A

== Playoffs ==
=== American Conference Wild Card: at (4) Utah Blaze ===
| Quarter | 1 | 2 | 3 | 4 | Total |
|---|---|---|---|---|---|
| (5) COL | 7 | 14 | 7 | 21 | 49 |
| (4) UTA | 14 | 10 | 7 | 13 | 44 |

at EnergySolutions Arena, Salt Lake City, Utah

- Date: June 28
- Game time: 4:00 PM EST
- Game attendance: 10,073

Game information

1st Quarter:

- 12:03 UTA – Aaron Boone 13 yd pass from Joe Germaine (Steve Videtich kick) – 7–0 UTA
- 06:18 UTA – JJ McKelvey 15 yd pass from Joe Germaine (Steve Videtich kick) – 14–0 UTA
- 02:15 COL – Robert Thomas 18 yd pass from John Dutton (Deric Yaussi kick) – 14–7 UTA

2nd Quarter:

- 12:18 UTA – Huey Whittaker 9 yd pass from Joe Germaine (Steve Videtich kick) – 21–7 UTA
- 08:38 COL – Wendall Williams 5 yd pass from John Dutton (Deric Yaussi kick) – 21–14 UTA
- 04:10 UTA – Steve Videtich 30 yd field goal – 24–14 UTA
- 00:13 COL – Wendall Williams 2 yd pass from John Dutton (Deric Yaussi kick) – 24–21 UTA

3rd Quarter:

- 12:09 COL – Chris Watton 1 yd pass from John Dutton (Deric Yaussi kick) – 28–24 COL
- 10:33 UTA – JJ McKelvey 17 yd pass from Joe Germaine (Steve Videtich kick) – 31–28 UTA

4th Quarter:

- 11:01 COL – Ben Nelson 1 yd pass from Robert Thomas (Deric Yaussi kick) – 35–31 COL
- 06:21 UTA – JJ McKelvey 23 yd pass from Joe Germaine (Steve Videtich kick failed) – 37–35 UTA
- 03:37 COL – Wendall Williams 4 yd pass from John Dutton (Deric Yaussi kick) – 42–37 COL
- 01:00 COL – Willie Quinnie 5 yd pass from John Dutton (Deric Yaussi kick) – 49–37 COL
- 00:36 UTA – Huey Whittaker 4 yd pass from Joe Germaine (Steve Videtich kick) – 49–44 COL
- Officials: Referee: Pat Garvey; Umpire: Jeff Carr; Linesman: Kelly Saalfeld; Line judge: Art Lucky; Back judge: Keith Washington
- Offensive Player of the Game: John Dutton (COL)
- Defensive Player of the Game: Eddie Canonico (UTAH)
- Ironman Player of the Game: Wendall Williams (COL)

=== American Conference Divisional: at (2) San Jose SaberCats ===
| Quarter | 1 | 2 | 3 | 4 | Total |
|---|---|---|---|---|---|
| (5) COL | 7 | 17 | 0 | 27 | 51 |
| (2) SJ | 13 | 20 | 3 | 28 | 64 |

at HP Pavilion at San Jose, San Jose, California

- Date: July 7
- Game time: 3:00 PM EST
- Game attendance: 12,479

Game information

1st Quarter:

- 10:23 SJ – James Roe 5 yd pass from Mark Grieb (A.J. Haglund kick failed) – 6–0 SJ
- 08:38 COL – Wendall Williams 34 yd pass from John Dutton (Deric Yaussi kick) – 7–6 COL
- 04:40 SJ – James Roe 5 yd pass from Mark Grieb (A.J. Haglund kick) – 13–7 SJ

2nd Quarter:

- 14:56 COL – Deric Yaussi 22 yd field goal COL 10 – SJS 13
- 11:07 SJ – Rodney Wright 45 yd pass from Mark Grieb (A.J. Haglund kick failed) – 19–10 SJ
- 08:39 COL – Ben Nelson 21 yd pass from John Dutton (Deric Yaussi kick) – 19–17 SJ
- 06:44 SJ – Rodney Wright 4 yd pass from Mark Grieb (A.J. Haglund kick) – 26–17 SJ
- 00:54 COL – Willie Quinnie 14 yd pass from John Dutton (Deric Yaussi kick) – 26–24 SJ
- 00:16 SJ – James Roe 8 yd pass from Mark Grieb (A.J. Haglund kick) – 33–24 SJ

3rd Quarter:

- 02:00 SJ – A.J. Haglund 37 yd field goal – 36–24 SJ

4th Quarter:

- 12:58 COL – Willie Quinnie 8 yd pass from John Dutton (Deric Yaussi kick blocked) – 36–30 SJ
- 10:34 SJ – Cleannord Saintil 11 yd pass from Mark Grieb (A.J. Haglund kick) – 43–30 SJ
- 06:55 SJ – Marquis Floyd 47 yd interception return (A.J. Haglund kick) – 50–30 SJ
- 03:57 COL – Ben Nelson 7 yd pass from John Dutton (Deric Yaussi kick) – 50–37 SJ
- 03:04 SJ – Cleannord Saintil 10 yd pass from Mark Grieb (A.J. Haglund kick) – 57–37 SJ
- 00:56 COL – Ben Nelson 5 yd pass from John Dutton (Deric Yaussi kick) – 57–44 SJ
- 00:51 SJ – Steve Watson 9 yd kickoff return (A.J. Haglund kick) – 64–44 SJ
- 00:23 COL – Ben Nelson 3 yd pass from John Dutton (Deric Yaussi kick) – 64–51 SJ
- Officials: Referee: Bill McCabe; Umpire: Rick Nelson; Linesman: Mike McCabe; Line judge: Brian Matthew; Back judge: Bud McCleskey
- Offensive Player of the Game: Mark Grieb (SJ)
- Defensive Player of the Game: Omarr Smith (SJ)
- Ironman Player of the Game: Rodney Wright (SJ)
