= Delvin Hughley =

American football player (born 1978)

No. 13, 2
- Position: Defensive back

Personal information
- Born: April 18, 1978 (age 48); Anniston, Alabama, U.S.
- Listed height: 5 ft 11 in (1.80 m)
- Listed weight: 204 lb (93 kg)

Career information
- High school: Anniston
- College: Jacksonville State
- NFL draft: 2001: undrafted

Career history
- Baltimore Ravens (2001); Denver Broncos (2001); Colorado Crush (2003); Indiana Firebirds (2004); Colorado Crush (2005–2008)

Awards and highlights
- ArenaBowl champion (2005)
- Stats at ArenaFan.com

Delvin Lamar Hughley (born April 18, 1978) is an American former professional football defensive back. He played college football at Jacksonville State University, where he was an All-American.

== Early life ==
Hughley attended Anniston High School in Anniston, Alabama, and was a letterman in football, basketball, track, and tennis. He only played high school football as a senior, and was an All-County selection and an All-State Honorable Mention selection. Hughley enrolled at Jacksonville State University where he became a 4-year starter and All-American Defensive Back.

== Professional career ==
Hughley signed as an undrafted free agent with the Baltimore Ravens in 2001. He spent a little time on the active rosters of both the Ravens and Denver Broncos but did not play in any games.

Hughley later played in the Arena Football League.
