= Kevin McKenzie (American football) =

American football player (born 1975)

No. 82, 87, 80
- Position: Wide receiver

Personal information
- Born: September 20, 1975 (age 51); Los Angeles, California, U.S.
- Listed height: 5 ft 9 in (1.75 m)
- Listed weight: 187 lb (85 kg)

Career information
- High school: Woodrow Wilson Classical (Long Beach, California)
- College: Washington State
- NFL draft: 1998: undrafted

Career history
- San Francisco 49ers (1998)*; Philadelphia Eagles (1998); Miami Dolphins (1999); Florida Bobcats (2001); Oakland Raiders (2002)*; Detroit Lions (2002)*; Scottish Claymores (2002); San Jose SaberCats (2003); Colorado Crush (2004–2005); San Jose SaberCats (2006); Arizona Rattlers (2007)
- * Offseason or practice squad member only

Awards and highlights
- ArenaBowl champion (2005); AFL All-Ironman Team (2004)

Career NFL statistics
- Receptions: 2
- Receiving yards: 18
- Stats at Pro Football Reference

Career AFL statistics
- Receptions: 273
- Receiving yards: 3,199
- Receiving touchdowns: 58
- Stats at ArenaFan.com

Kevin Eugene McKenzie (born September 20, 1975) is an American former professional football player who was a wide receiver in the National Football League (NFL) and Arena Football League (AFL). He was signed by the Philadelphia Eagles as an undrafted free agent in 1998. He played college football for the Washington State Cougars.

McKenzie also played for the Miami Dolphins, Florida Bobcats, San Jose SaberCats, Colorado Crush and Arizona Rattlers.

== Early life and college ==
Born in Los Angeles, California, McKenzie went to Woodrow Wilson high school in Long Beach and played college football at Washington State University. He received a B.A. degree from Washington State and went on to complete an A.A. degree in physical education in California.
