= Chris Watton =

American football player (born 1977)

No. 67
- Position: Offensive tackle

Personal information
- Born: October 6, 1977 (age 49); Sioux Falls, South Dakota, U.S.
- Listed height: 6 ft 3 in (1.91 m)
- Listed weight: 285 lb (129 kg)

Career information
- College: SW Miss CC; Baylor

Career history
- Arizona Cardinals (2000)*; Scottish Claymores (2001); Baltimore Ravens (2001)*; Green Bay Packers (2002)*; Denver Broncos (2002-2003)*; Tampa Bay Buccaneers (2005)*; Denver Broncos (2005)*; Colorado Crush (2005–2008); Houston Texans (2006)*
- * Offseason or practice squad member only

Awards and highlights
- ArenaBowl champion (2005)
- Stats at ArenaFan.com

Christopher Lee Watton (born October 6, 1977) is an American former professional football offensive lineman for the Colorado Crush of the Arena Football League (AFL).

== Early life ==
Watton attended Foley High School in Foley, Alabama and was a student and played football, basketball, track, and baseball. As a senior football player, Watton was an All-County selection, an All-Region selection, and an All-State selection.
