= Kyle Moore-Brown =

American football player and coach (born 1971)

New Mexico Chupacabras
- Title: Head coach

Personal information
- Born: February 26, 1971 (age 55); Newark, New Jersey, U.S.
- Listed height: 6 ft 4 in (1.93 m)
- Listed weight: 306 lb (139 kg)

Career information
- High school: Central (Newark)
- College: Kansas
- NFL draft: 1993: undrafted

Career history

Playing
- Detroit Lions (1994); Albany / Indiana Firebirds (1995–2003); Colorado Crush (2004–2008)

Coaching
- La Crosse Spartans (2010–2011) (OL/DL/Interim HC); Cedar Rapids Titans (2012); Iowa Barnstormers (2013) (OL/DL); Pittsburgh Power (2014) (OL); Nebraska Danger (2016–2019) (OL / Associate head coach); Vegas Knight Hawks (2022–2025) (OL / Associate head coach); New Mexico Chupacabras (2026–Present) (Head Coach)

Awards and highlights
- 2× ArenaBowl champion (1999, 2005); First-team All-Arena (2007); Second-team All-Arena (2008); 3× AFL All-Ironman Team (2002, 2005, 2006); Arena Football Hall of Fame inductee (2014)

Career AFL statistics
- Tackles: 81
- Sacks: 11
- Forced Fumbles: 4
- Fumble Recoveries: 10
- Blocked kicks: 2
- Stats at ArenaFan.com

Kyle Moore-Brown (born February 26, 1971) is a former Arena Football League (AFL) offensive lineman/defensive lineman for the Albany/Indiana Firebirds and the Colorado Crush. He is currently the Head coach of the New Mexico Chupacabras of the Indoor Football League (IFL)after serving as the offensive line coach and Associate Head Coach for the Vegas Knight Hawks. He was the head coach of the Cedar Rapids Titans of the IFL.

== Early life ==
While attending Central High School in Newark, New Jersey, Moore-Brown was a standout in football and track. In football, he played fullback, was an All-State pick, an All-City pick, and as a senior, he rushed for 1,300 yards, and 17 touchdowns. Moore-Brown graduated from Central High School in 1989.

== College career ==
Moore-Brown played college football for the University of Kansas Jayhawks.

== Professional career ==
Kyle Moore-Brown played for 2 teams in the Arena Football League: the Albany Firebirds (1995–2003), and the Colorado Crush (2004–2008).

== Coaching career ==
After the original Arena Football League suspended operations following the 2008 season, Moore-Brown became the assistant head coach of the La Crosse Spartans, an Indoor Football League team that began play in 2010. In 2011, he became the head coach of the La Crosse Spartans when his brother Gilbert Brown stepped away from the team for personal reasons. Moore-Brown returned to the AFL in 2013 when he was named the offensive and defensive line coach for the Iowa Barnstormers. In 2014, Moore-Brown accepted the offensive line coach position with the Pittsburgh Power.

On September 26, 2025, Moore-Brown was announced as the Head Coach for the newly rebranded New Mexico Chupacabras of the IFL.
