= John Dutton (quarterback) =

American football player (born 1975)

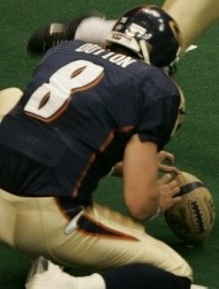
- Dutton with the Colorado Crush in 2005

No. 8, 17
- Position: Quarterback

Personal information
- Born: September 20, 1975 (age 51); Newport Beach, California, U.S.
- Listed height: 6 ft 4 in (1.93 m)
- Listed weight: 225 lb (102 kg)

Career information
- High school: Fallbrook (CA) Union
- College: Nevada
- NFL draft: 1998: 6th round, 172nd overall pick

Career history
- Miami Dolphins (1998)*; Atlanta Falcons (1998)*; Cleveland Browns (1999)*; San Jose SaberCats (2000–2002); Colorado Crush (2003–2008); RiverCity Rage (2009); Cleveland Gladiators (2010–2012); San Antonio Talons (2013)
- * Offseason or practice squad member only

Awards and highlights
- 2× ArenaBowl champion (2002, 2005); ArenaBowl MVP (2002); 2× Al Lucas Hero Award (2007, 2012); 2× Big West Offensive Player of the Year (1996, 1997); 2× First-team All-Big West (1996, 1997)

Career AFL statistics
- Comp. / Att.: 3,280 / 5,239
- Passing yards: 37,981
- TD–INT: 752–145
- Passer rating: 108.82
- Rushing TD: 22
- Stats at ArenaFan.com

John Dutton (born September 20, 1975) is an American former professional football quarterback who played in the Arena Football League (AFL). He was drafted out of University of Nevada, Reno in the 6th round of the 1998 NFL draft by the Miami Dolphins. In 2005, he led the Crush to the ArenaBowl XIX title. In 2006, he was on the cover of EA Sports' first AFL video game, Arena Football. He had been the backup quarterback for the San Jose SaberCats behind Mark Grieb. After Grieb's suffered a season-ending injury earlier in the year, Dutton quarterbacked the SaberCats to a 52–14 victory over the Arizona Rattlers in ArenaBowl XVI. He was named Offensive Player of the Game for his performance. In June 2009, Dutton was signed by the RiverCity Rage of the Indoor Football League (IFL). On February 12, 2010, it was announced that Dutton had been signed by the Cleveland Gladiators.

== Early life ==
Dutton attended Fallbrook Union High School in Fallbrook, California, and was a letterman in basketball and football. In football, he passed for 2,056 yards and ten touchdowns as a senior. Dutton then played college football for the Texas Longhorns, but was only a backup to starting quarterback James Brown. He later transferred to Nevada, and played for the Nevada Wolf Pack. Dutton helped the Wolf Pack win two Big West championships, and the 1996 Las Vegas Bowl.

== Professional career ==
=== Miami Dolphins ===
Dutton was selected by the Miami Dolphins in the 6th round of the 1998 NFL draft with the 172nd overall pick. He was released during the Dolphins' training camp.

=== Atlanta Falcons ===
Dutton was picked up in training camp by the Atlanta Falcons, but never played in a game.

=== Cleveland Browns ===
In 1999, Dutton was signed by the Cleveland Browns, but was placed on injured reserve after breaking his ankle. .

=== San Jose SaberCats ===
After being placed on the IR, Dutton signed to play in the Arena Football League where he was the backup quarterback for the San Jose SaberCats behind Mark Grieb. After Grieb suffered a season-ending injury earlier in the year, Dutton quarterbacked the SaberCats to a 52–14 victory over the Arizona Rattlers in ArenaBowl XVI. He was named Offensive Player of the Game for his performance.

=== Colorado Crush ===
In 2005, he led the Crush to the ArenaBowl XIX title. In 2006, he was on the cover of the EA Sports AFL video game, Arena Football.

=== RiverCity Rage ===
When the Arena Football League suspended play in 2009, Dutton was signed by the RiverCity Rage of the Indoor Football League. He only played in one game for the Rage that year in June against Bloomington.

=== Cleveland Gladiators ===
On February 12, 2010, Dutton was signed by the Cleveland Gladiators. He played for the Gladiators for 3 seasons. He missed most of the 2011 season with a torn Achilles tendon. In 2012, he won the Al Lucas AFL Hero Jason Foundation Award.

=== San Antonio Talons ===
In March 2013, Dutton was signed by the San Antonio Talons. During the 2nd game of the season he ruptured his right Achilles tendon forcing him out of action for the remainder of the year. He retired at season's end.

=== AFL statistics ===
Legend
	ArenaBowl MVP
	Won the ArenaBowl
	Led the league
**Bold**	Career high

Year	Team	Passing							Rushing		
Year	Team	Cmp	Att	Pct	Yds	TD	Int	Rtg	Att	Yds	TD
2000	San Jose	28	46	60.9	369	9	0	125.82	2	-8	0
2001	San Jose	127	212	59.9	1,810	31	7	110.38	5	-13	0
2002	San Jose	34	58	58.6	391	8	2	99.14	2	3	1
2003	Colorado	289	495	58.4	3,964	77	19	107.00	13	-39	2
2004	Colorado	340	535	63.6	4,189	76	8	116.95	**22**	3	1
2005	Colorado	367	586	62.6	4,143	89	14	111.75	7	3	1
2006	Colorado	390	614	63.5	4,421	95	16	112.84	15	-8	**5**
2007	Colorado	395	645	61.2	4,371	84	18	102.28	8	**44**	1
2008	Colorado	**449**	681	65.9	4,548	94	17	108.96	12	19	**5**
2010	Cleveland	446	**696**	64.1	**5,104**	**100**	19	110.58	10	-8	1
2011	Cleveland	20	30	**66.7**	257	6	0	**132.92**	1	1	1
2012	Cleveland	364	580	62.8	4,044	78	**22**	101.25	17	-3	4
2013	San Antonio	31	61	50.8	370	5	3	69.71	4	6	0
Career		3,280	5,239	62.6	37,981	752	145	108.82	118	0	22

== Coaching career ==
John Dutton coached high school football at Linfield Christian School in Temecula, California during the 2004–2005 season. As the quarterback and wide receiver coach, Dutton helped lead Linfield Christian on to a 10–2–1 overall record. He served as quarterback and running backs coach at College of the Siskiyous in Weed, California in 2015. Starting in 2017, Dutton became head coach at Mt. Shasta High School in Mt. Shasta, California, where he coached the team to a 1–9 record in his first season. In 2018, he was named the new head coach at McCloud High School in McCloud, California, coaching 8-man football, their first program in 17 years. In 2021, Dutton joined the varsity football coaching staff at Reno High School in Reno, Nevada.

== Missions work ==
Dutton, his wife Terina and their children served as missionaries in Africa. They founded The Dutton Family Foundation.
