= Ricky Ortiz =

American football player and professional wrestler (born 1975)

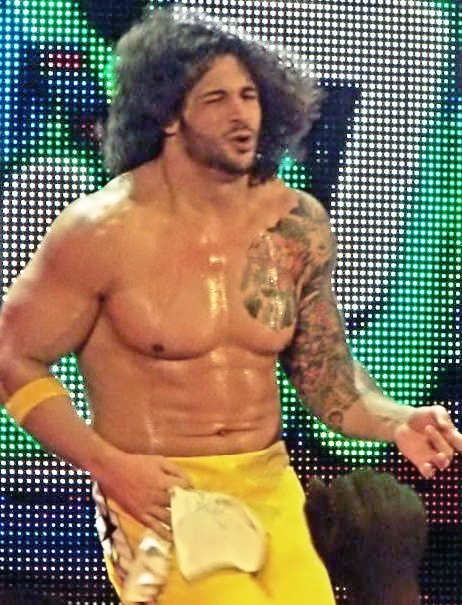
- Ortiz in 2009
- Born: Richard Young; May 12, 1975 (age 51); Phoenix, Arizona, U.S.
- Spouse: Layla El (m. 2015; div. 2025)
- Children: 1
- Professional wrestling career
- Ring name(s): Atlas DaBone; Atlas Ortiz; Rich Young; Ricky Ortiz
- Billed height: 6 ft 4 in (1.93 m)
- Billed weight: 246 lb (112 kg)
- Billed from: Paradise Valley, Arizona
- Trained by: Ohio Valley Wrestling; Florida Championship Wrestling
- Debut: 2006
- Retired: 2013
- Football career

Profile
- Position: Linebacker

Career information
- College: Tulsa
- NFL draft: 1998: undrafted

Career history
- Saskatchewan Roughriders (1999); Milwaukee Mustangs (2000–2001); Orlando Rage (2001); Indiana Firebirds (2002–2003); Colorado Crush (2004–2006)

Awards and highlights
- ArenaBowl champion (2005); Second-team All-Arena (2005)
- Stats at ArenaFan.com

Richard Young (born May 12, 1975) is an American former professional wrestler and football player. He is best known for his work with WWE performing under the ring name Ricky Ortiz.

Young spent time in the XFL, Canadian Football League (CFL), and Arena Football League (AFL).

== Football career ==
=== College ===
Young spent two years at Glendale Community College in Glendale, Arizona. He then transferred to the University of Tulsa and played for the Tulsa Golden Hurricane. He was a two-year letter winner. He played 22 career games and was credited with 177 tackles as a linebacker.

=== Professional football ===
After college, Young attended minicamp with the Kansas City Chiefs on a tryout basis. In 1999, he went to the Canadian Football League (CFL) and played for the Saskatchewan Roughriders. He spent the 2000 and 2001 seasons in the Arena Football League with the Milwaukee Mustangs. In the AFL, Young played both fullback and linebacker. Following the AFL, Young joined the short-lived XFL with the Orlando Rage. After the league folded, Young attempted to make the Jacksonville Jaguars roster, but was waived during training camp. He rejoined the AFL, this time with the Indiana Firebirds, in 2002. He would spend the next two years in Indiana before joining the Colorado Crush in 2004. In 2003, he led all AFL middle linebackers with 4.0 sacks.

== Professional wrestling career ==
=== World Wrestling Entertainment (2006–2009) ===
Young made his professional wrestling debut with Ohio Valley Wrestling in late 2006 under the ring name Atlas DaBone. On January 12, 2008, DaBone became the number one contender to the OVW Heavyweight Championship after beating Mike Kruel in a best of 3 series.

On July 1, 2008, Young made his WWE debut under the name Atlas Ortiz on the ECW brand, winning his first match against Armando Estrada. The next week on ECW, Tazz and Mike Adamle referred to him as "Ricky Ortiz". He acknowledged the name change in an interview segment on the same show; Lena Yada called him Atlas and he responded by saying, "My friends call me Ricky". On the July 15 episode of ECW, he used the nickname, "The Latin Assassin". Ortiz defeated Chavo Guerrero by disqualification on July 29. The next week he beat Guerrero and Bam Neely in a tag team match with Evan Bourne.

Although enjoying a streak of 5–0, on October 7, Ortiz would team with Kofi Kingston, CM Punk, and Evan Bourne against John Morrison, The Miz, Cody Rhodes, and Ted DiBiase in an 8-man tag match losing effort. After a distraction from Manu, Morrison would then perform a Moonlight Drive on Punk and pin him for the victory. This would be Young's first televised loss since debuting on ECW, although he was still undefeated in singles competition. On the December 2 episode of ECW, he suffered his first pinfall loss at the hands of Jack Swagger, who was also undefeated at the time.

On April 15, 2009, Ortiz was drafted to the SmackDown brand as part of the 2009 Supplemental Draft. On the May 15 episode of SmackDown, Ortiz made his debut for the brand, losing to Jeff Hardy. His last match for WWE was on the August 7 episode of SmackDown, where he was squashed by The Great Khali. He was released from his WWE contract on August 8, 2009.

=== Independent circuit and retirement (2009–2013) ===
A week after his WWE release, on August 15, 2009, Young appeared at a World Wrestling Council show, using the name 'Ricky Ortiz' and challenging Shane Sewell for the WWC Puerto Rico Heavyweight Championship. He failed to win, and attacked Sewell after the match. In early 2010, Ortiz appeared for the Combat Championship Wrestling promotion, wrestling against Shawn Spears and Sinn Bodhi. He then began competing for Florida-based promotions, including I Believe in Wrestling and WWA. On January 14, 2011 Young appeared at Vintage Pro Wrestling's Wrestlebrawl 2 event with Scott Hall, using the NWO Wolfpac theme for his entrance, to face Kennedy Kendrick. Despite originally winning the match, Young would lose when the referee reversed his decision and disqualified him due to refusing to release a hold.

In May 2011, it was revealed that Ortiz would take part in a new hiphop/pro wrestling collaboration, the Urban Wrestling Federation, with taping of the first event "First Blood" taking place on June 3.

On December 28, 2013, Ortiz debuted in Extreme Rising, defeating Homicide. Subsequently, Ortiz would retire from professional wrestling, so that he could concentrate more on his personal life with fellow wrestler, Layla El.

Even though he is retired, Ortiz works as a producer for various independent promotions.

== Other media ==
Young appeared on the November 25, 2008 episode of Cha$e as a hunter. Young also appeared on Scott Hall's web show Last Call with Scott Hall.

== Personal life ==
In July 2015, Young got engaged to English professional wrestler Layla El, and the two were married on November 27. Young and Layla got divorced in 2025.

== Championships and accomplishments ==
- Independent Wrestling Association Florida
  - IWA Florida Tag Team Championship (1 time, inaugural) – with Rico Suave
- Ohio Valley Wrestling
  - Elimination Tournament (2007)

== See also ==
- List of gridiron football players who became professional wrestlers
