= 2004 Las Vegas Gladiators season =

Arena Football League team season

- Head coach: Frank Haege
- Home stadium: Thomas & Mack Center

Results
- Record: 8–8
- Division place: 4th AC Western
- Playoffs: Did not qualify

The 2004 Las Vegas Gladiators season was the 8th season for the franchise. This was the first season in which the Gladiators were members of the AFL's Western Division. They finished at 8–8, 4th in the Western Division. The Gladiators did not qualify for the playoffs.

== Season schedule ==
Week	Date	Opponent	Result	Record
1	February 6	@ Colorado	L 43–42	0–1
2	February 14	Los Angeles	L 62–55	0–2
3	February 22	@ Grand Rapids	W 51–14	1–2
4	February 29	New Orleans	W 50–30	2–2
5	March 7	@ Georgia	L 55–40	2–3
6	March 14	Arizona	W 65–64 (OT)	3–3
7	March 20	@ San Jose	L 79–62	3–4
8	March 27	@ Orlando	L 60–43	3–5
9	April 4	Chicago	L 57–55	3–6
10	April 10	@ Arizona	L 80–63	3–7
12	April 25	Detroit	W 60–34	4–7
13	May 2	Indiana	W 60–38	5–7
14	May 8	@ Philadelphia	W 63–35	6–7
15	May 16	San Jose	W 44–35	7–7
16	May 22	@ Los Angeles	L 54–51	7–8
17	May 30	Columbus	W 64–51	8–8

== Coaching ==
Frank Haege entered his third and final season as the head coach of the Gladiators.

== Stats ==
=== Offense ===
==== Quarterback ====
Player	Comp.	Att.	Comp%	Yards	TD's	INT's	Long	Rating

==== Running backs ====
Player	Car.	Yards	Avg.	TD's	Long

==== Wide receivers ====
Player	Rec.	Yards	Avg.	TD's	Long

==== Touchdowns ====
Player	TD's	Rush	Rec	Ret	Pts

=== Defense ===
Player	Tackles	Solo	Assisted	Sack	Solo	Assisted	INT	Yards	TD's	Long

=== Special teams ===
==== Kick return ====
Player	Ret	Yards	TD's	Long	Avg	Ret	Yards	TD's	Long	Avg

==== Kicking ====
Player	Extra pt.	Extra pt. Att.	FG	FGA	Long	Pct.	Pts
