= Chris Snyder (American football, born 1974) =

American football player (born 1974)

Profile
- Position: Offensive lineman / Defensive lineman

Personal information
- Born: December 5, 1974 (age 51)
- Listed height: 6 ft 3 in (1.91 m)
- Listed weight: 270 lb (122 kg)

Career information
- College: Penn State

Career history
- Albany/Indiana Firebirds (1999–2004); Colorado Crush (2006–2008)

Awards and highlights
- ArenaBowl champion (1999); First-team All-Arena (2002); 2× AFL All-Ironman Team (2004, 2007)

Career AFL statistics
- Tackles: 82
- Sacks: 17.5
- Forced fumbles: 7
- Fumbles recovered: 7
- Pass breakups: 5
- Stats at ArenaFan.com

Chris Snyder (born December 5, 1974) is an American former professional football lineman who played seven seasons in the Arena Football League (AFL) with the Albany/Indiana Firebirds and Colorado Crush. He played college football at Pennsylvania State University.

== College career ==
Snyder played college football for the Penn State Nittany Lions. He was a two-year starter for the Lions and recorded 45 tackles, one forced fumble and one fumble recovery, his senior year. He compiled career totals of 59 tackles and nine sacks. Snyder began his career at Penn State as a tight end and made the transition to defensive line after redshirting his freshman season.

== Professional career ==
Snyder played for the AFL's Albany/Indiana Firebirds from 1999 to 2004, earning first-team All-Arena honors in 2002 and All-Ironman Team recognition in 2004. He was signed by the Colorado Crush of the AFL on May 10, 2006. He was released by the Crush on February 22, 2008.
