= Kevin Gaines (gridiron football) =

American football player (born 1971)

No. 25, 24, 21
- Position: Defensive back

Personal information
- Born: August 7, 1971 (age 55); Euclid, Ohio, U.S.
- Listed height: 6 ft 1 in (1.85 m)
- Listed weight: 205 lb (93 kg)

Career information
- College: Louisville (1990–1993)
- NFL draft: 1994: undrafted

Career history
- New Orleans Saints (1995)*; London Monarchs (1996); Hamilton Tiger-Cats (1996); London Monarchs (1997); Orlando Predators (1998–1999); New Jersey Red Dogs/Gladiators (2000–2001); Florida Bobcats (2001); Carolina Cobras (2002); Georgia Force (2003–2005); Philadelphia Soul (2006–2007); Grand Rapids Rampage (2007); Columbus Destroyers (2008)
- * Offseason or practice squad member only

Awards and highlights
- ArenaBowl champion (1998); 2× Second-team All-Arena (2004, 2005)
- Stats at ArenaFan.com

Kevin Gaines (born August 7, 1971) is an American former professional football defensive specialist who played in the Arena Football League (AFL). He was named second-team All-Arena in 2004 and 2005. He played for the Orlando Predators, New Jersey Red Dogs/Gladiators, Florida Bobcats, Carolina Cobras, Georgia Force, Philadelphia Soul, Grand Rapids Rampage, and Columbus Destroyers. He also played for the London Monarchs in the World League of American Football (WLAF), and the Hamilton Tiger-Cats of the Canadian Football League (CFL).

== College career ==
Gaines attended University of Louisville, and was a student and a letterman in football. In football, as a senior, Gaines was named Louisville's Defensive Player of the Year and was a second team All-America pick, and after his senior season, participated in the Senior Bowl.
