= Aaron McConnell =

American gridiron football player (born 1980)

Profile
- Positions: Offensive lineman, defensive lineman

Personal information
- Born: July 7, 1980 (age 46)
- Listed height: 6 ft 3 in (1.91 m)
- Listed weight: 300 lb (136 kg)

Career information
- High school: Midwest City (Midwest City, Oklahoma)
- College: Pittsburg State (KS)
- NFL draft: 2004: undrafted

Career history
- Tennessee Titans (2004)*; Nashville Kats (2004–2007); Colorado Crush (2007–2008); Winnipeg Blue Bombers (2009)*; Alabama Vipers (2010); Georgia Force (2011); Chicago Rush (2011)
- * Offseason or practice squad member only

Awards and highlights
- First-team All-Arena (2008); AFL All-Ironman Team (2010); AFL All-Rookie Team (2005)

Career AFL statistics
- Tackles: 81
- Sacks: 26
- Forced fumbles: 5
- Pass breakups: 14
- Blocked kicks: 4
- Stats at ArenaFan.com

Aaron Richard McConnell (born July 7, 1980) is an American former professional football lineman who played six seasons in the Arena Football League (AFL) with the Nashville Kats, Colorado Crush, Alabama Vipers and Georgia Force. He first enrolled at Oklahoma State University before transferring to Pittsburg State University. He was also a member of the Tennessee Titans, Winnipeg Blue Bombers and Chicago Rush.

== Early life ==
McConnell first played high school football at Choctaw High School in Choctaw, Oklahoma. He transferred to Midwest City High School in Midwest City, Oklahoma his sophomore year. He earned all-state honors in football, wrestling and track for the Midwest City Bombers. He also won the state championship in Oklahoma the first year he ever wrestled.

== College career ==
McConnell initially signed to play college football for the Oklahoma State Cowboys.

He transferred to play for the Pittsburg State Gorillas from 2000 to 2003. He was a consensus first-team All-America selection and MIAA Defensive Player of the Year as a senior in 2003. McConnell also earned first-team All-America honors from the AFCA his sophomore year in 2001 and from the Associated Press as a junior in 2002, after receiving honorable mention All-America recognition as a freshman in 2000. A four-time first-team All-MIAA performer, he recorded career totals of 232 tackles (116 solo) with 75.0 tackles-for-loss and 21.0 quarterback sacks in 48 games for the Gorillas. He was inducted into the Pittsburg State University Intercollegiate Athletics Hall of Fame in 2013. McConnell also participated in cheerleading for the Gorillas, winning the Collegiate National Cheerleading Championship his freshman season in 2000.

== Professional career ==
McConnell was signed by the Tennessee Titans of the National Football League (NFL) on April 26, 2004 after going undrafted in the 2004 NFL draft. He was released by the Titans on August 31, 2004. He signed with the Nashville Kats of the Arena Football League (AFL) on October 15, 2004. McConnell played for the Kats from 2005 to 2007, earning All-Rookie Team honors in 2005. He was selected by the Colorado Crush of the AFL in the 2007 dispersal draft and played for the team in 2008, earning First-team All-Arena recognition. He signed with the Winnipeg Blue Bombers of the Canadian Football League as a defensive lineman in May 2009. McConnell retired from football in June 2009. He came out of retirement to sign with the Alabama Vipers of the AFL on January 20, 2010 and played for them during the 2010 season, earning All-Ironman Team honors. He signed with the Georgia Force of the AFL on March 24, 2011. McConnell was traded to the Chicago Rush for a claim order position on April 21, 2011.
