= Deric Yaussi =

American football player (born 1983)

No. 40
- Position: Placekicker

Personal information
- Born: August 13, 1983 (age 43)
- Listed height: 5 ft 11 in (1.80 m)
- Listed weight: 190 lb (86 kg)

Career information
- High school: Poudre High School
- College: Wyoming
- NFL draft: 2006: undrafted

Career history
- Colorado Ice (2007); Colorado Crush (2008)

Awards and highlights
- First-team All-MW (2004)

Deric Yaussi (born August 13, 1983) is an American former football placekicker who attended Wyoming.

== Wyoming ==
Deric played under head coach Joe Glenn.

=== 2002 ===
As a true freshman, Yaussi played in three games. However, he did not attempt any field goals or extra points but performed kickoff duties in the three games he played. He earned his first varsity letter.

=== 2003 ===
In 2003, he led the Mountain West Conference in point-after touchdown percentage hitting 97.1%. He was also ranked No. 5 in the league for field-goal percentage. Yaussi earned Honorable Mention All-MWC honors as a sophomore.

=== 2004 ===
Yaussi was selected the First Team All-MWC place kicker as a junior. Yaussi was named MWC Special Teams Player of the Week versus San Diego State on October 9, 2004.

=== 2005 ===
During the 2005 season he was in the running for the Lou Groza Award. He played in the 2006 Senior Bowl.

== Pro career ==
Yaussi went undrafted in the 2006 NFL draft. In 2007, he was a member of the Colorado Ice. In 2008, Yaussi replaced injured kicker Clay Rush for the Colorado Crush.

== Personal life ==
Yaussi later became a kicking coach and ran his own kicking camp. He also taught at Loveland High and coached their football team.
