= Rashad Floyd =

American football player (born 1979)

No. 4
- Position: Defensive back

Personal information
- Born: April 7, 1979 (age 47); Oakland, California, U.S.
- Listed height: 6 ft 0 in (1.83 m)
- Listed weight: 180 lb (82 kg)

Career information
- College: Portland State

Career history
- Orlando Predators (2002–2003); Colorado Crush (2004–2008)

Awards and highlights
- ArenaBowl champion (2005); 3× Second-team All-Arena (2004, 2006, 2007)

Career AFL statistics
- Tackles: 677
- Pass breakups: 115
- Fumble recoveries: 10
- Interceptions: 42
- Total TDs: 7
- Stats at ArenaFan.com

Rashad Floyd (born April 7, 1979) is an American former professional football defensive back who played in the Arena Football League (AFL) with the Orlando Predators and Colorado Crush. He played college football at Portland State. He owns the AFL record for most solo tackles in a season with 141 (2007). Floyd is tied with Barry Wagner for the third-most solo tackles in league history with 677.
