= Mike Dailey =

American football coach

Current position
- Record: 9–21

Coaching career (HC unless noted)
- 1989–1990: Washington Commandos (assistant)
- 1997–2003: Albany/Indiana Firebirds
- 2004–2008: Colorado Crush
- 2009–2014: McDaniel (DC)
- 2015: McDaniel (PGC/WR)
- 2016–2018: McDaniel

Head coaching record
- Overall: 115–84 (AFL); 9–21 (college)

Accomplishments and honors

Awards
- 2 ArenaBowl (1999, 2005)

Mike Dailey is an American former football coach. He served as the head football coach at McDaniel College from 2016 to 2018, compiling a record of 9–21. Dailey was a head coach in the Arena Football League for the Albany Firebirds and the Colorado Crush. During his time in the Arena Football League, he won two ArenaBowls and was named AFL Coach of the Year in 1999. He is fifth all time in wins with a career record of 115–84, including an 11–8 mark in the postseason. Under his leadership, the Firebirds won ArenaBowl XIII in 1999, defeating the Orlando Predators led by Jay Gruden, former head coach of the Washington Redskins. In 2005 the Crush, then owned by John Elway, won the ArenaBowl XIX. Dailey's 1999 Albany Firebirds team was voted the greatest team in AFL history, while his 2005 Colorado Crush was voted fifth. He was inducted into the Arena Football Hall of Fame in 2012.

== Head coaching record ==
=== College ===
Year	Team	Overall	Conference	Standing	Bowl/playoffs
McDaniel Green Terror (Centennial Conference) (2016–2018)
2016	McDaniel	3–7	3–6	T–6th	
2017	McDaniel	3–7	2–7	T–3rd	
2018	McDaniel	3–7	2–7	T–8th	
McDaniel:		9–21	7–20		
Total:		9–21			
