= Willie Quinnie =

American gridiron football player (1980–2021)

Profile
- Position: Wide receiver

Personal information
- Born: October 3, 1980; Theodore, Alabama, U.S.
- Died: July 4, 2021 (aged 40)
- Listed height: 6 ft 2 in (1.88 m)
- Listed weight: 180 lb (82 kg)

Career information
- College: UAB
- NFL draft: 2003: undrafted

Career history
- Oakland Raiders (2003)*; Atlanta Falcons (2003–2004)*; → Rhein Fire (2004); San Diego Chargers (2004–2005)*; Green Bay Packers (2006)*; Hamilton Tiger-Cats (2006); Colorado Crush (2007–2008); Hamilton Tiger-Cats (2009); Spokane Shock (2010)*; Alabama Vipers (2010); Milwaukee Mustangs (2011)*
- * Offseason or practice squad member only
- Stats at CFL.ca (archive)
- Stats at ArenaFan.com

Willie Dee Quinnie Jr. (October 3, 1980 – July 4, 2021) was an American professional football wide receiver. He was signed by the Oakland Raiders as an undrafted free agent in 2003. He played college football at UAB.

Quinnie was also a member of the Atlanta Falcons, San Diego Chargers, Green Bay Packers and Colorado Crush.

Quinnie died on July 4, 2021, at the age of 40.
