= Anthony Dunn =

American football player (born 1980)

No. 91, 58, 43, 4
- Positions: Defensive end, linebacker

Personal information
- Born: July 1, 1980 (age 46); Denver, Colorado, U.S.
- Listed height: 6 ft 2 in (1.88 m)
- Listed weight: 255 lb (116 kg)

Career information
- High school: Centauri (La Jara, Colorado)
- College: Northern Colorado (1998–2002)
- NFL draft: 2003: undrafted

Career history
- Tennessee Titans (2003); Houston Texans (2004–2005)*; → Cologne Centurions (2005); Colorado Crush (2006–2007); Philadelphia Soul (2008)
- * Offseason or practice squad member only

Awards and highlights
- ArenaBowl champion (2008); AFL All-Rookie Team (2006); First-team Little All-America (2002); 3× First-team All-NCC (2000–2002)

Career NFL statistics
- Games played: 2
- Tackles: 1
- Stats at Pro Football Reference
- Stats at ArenaFan.com

Anthony Dunn (born July 1, 1980) is an American former professional football defensive end and linebacker who played in the National Football League (NFL) for the Tennessee Titans and Houston Texans. He played college football for the Northern Colorado Bears. Dunn also had a stint in NFL Europe with the Cologne Centurions and Arena Football League (AFL) with the Colorado Crush and Philadelphia Soul.

== Early life ==
Dunn was born on July 1, 1980, in Denver, Colorado. He attended Centauri High School in La Jara, Colorado and played basketball and football. Dunn was all-state selection in both sports.

== College career ==
Dunn played college football for the Northern Colorado Bears from 1998 to 2002. He earned three All-NCC honors from 2000 to 2002. Dunn was also a first-team Little All-America selection in 2002.

== Professional career ==
=== Tennessee Titans ===
After going undrafted in the 2003 NFL draft, Dunn signed with the Tennessee Titans as an undrafted free agent. On September 3, 2003, he was released by the team and signed to the practice squad on September 5. On November 21, Dunn was elevated to the active roster and made his first appearance against the Atlanta Falcons. He played ten snaps in the game and was released, two days later on November 25. On November 27, Dunn was re-signed to the practice squad. On November 29, he was signed to the active roster. In his second game, Dunn made one tackle for loss against the New York Jets. He was released by on December 2 and signed to the practice squad on December 4.

=== Houston Texans ===
On February 11, 2004, Dunn was signed by the Houston Texans. On September 5, he was waived by the team and was signed to the practice squad two days later. On October 19, Dunn was released by the team. He was re-signed to the practice squad on October 27. On January 5, 2005, Dunn re-signed with the team. On September 3, he was released.

=== Cologne Centurions ===
On February 16, 2005, Dunn was allocated to the Cologne Centurions of NFL Europe. He played in nine games, recording 21 tackles and one pass deflection.

=== Colorado Crush ===
On January 5, 2006, Dunn signed with the Colorado Crush of the Arena Football League (AFL). On defense, he had 32 tackles, four sacks, two pass break ups, one forced fumble and two fumble recoveries in 16 games. Dunn also had one catch for eight yards, 31 rushing yards, two rushing touchdowns, and was named to the AFL All-Rookie Team. On May 3, he was re-signed by the team.

In 2007, Dunn played in 16 games, recording 52 tackles, four sacks, four pass deflections, one interception, one forced fumble, two fumbler recoveries and one blocked kick. Offensively, he had one catch for seven yards and 11 yards rushing. Dunn became a free agent at the end of the season.

=== Philadelphia Soul ===
On October 31, 2007, Dunn was signed by the Philadelphia Soul. On June 4, he was placed on the inured reserve with a spleen injury. Dunn remained on the injured reserve as the Soul won Arenabowl XXII. He had 39 tackles, 5.5 sacks, four pass break ups and two forced fumbles.
