= Ahmad Hawkins =

American football player (born 1978)

No. 9
- Position: Defensive back

Personal information
- Born: December 10, 1978 (age 47); Hampton, Virginia, U.S.
- Listed height: 5 ft 10 in (1.78 m)
- Listed weight: 191 lb (87 kg)

Career information
- High school: Hampton (VA)
- College: Virginia

Career history
- Atlanta Falcons (2001)*; Kansas City Chiefs (2001–2002)*; Berlin Thunder (2002); Colorado Crush (2003–2006); Nashville Kats (2007); Grand Rapids Rampage (2008); Alabama Vipers (2010); Georgia Force (2011–2012)
- * Offseason or practice squad member only

Awards and highlights
- World Bowl champion (2002); ArenaBowl champion (2005); First-team All-Arena (2007)

Career AFL statistics
- Tackles: 460
- Interceptions: 46
- Fumble recoveries: 8
- Stats at ArenaFan.com

Ahmad Hawkins (born December 10, 1978) is an American former professional football defensive back. He played college football at Virginia. He was signed by the Colorado Crush as a street free agent in 2003.

Hawkins also played for the Berlin Thunder, Nashville Kats, Grand Rapids Rampage, Alabama Vipers and Georgia Force.
