= Damian Harrell =

American football player and coach (born 1975)

No. 1
- Position: Wide receiver

Personal information
- Born: September 1, 1975 (age 51); Miami, Florida, U.S.
- Listed height: 6 ft 3 in (1.91 m)
- Listed weight: 200 lb (91 kg)

Career information
- High school: South Miami (FL) Senior
- College: Florida State
- NFL draft: 1998: undrafted

Career history

Playing
- New England Sea Wolves (1999–2000); Toronto Phantoms (2001–2002); Colorado Crush (2003–2007); Chicago Rush (2008); Milwaukee Mustangs (2010–2011)

Coaching
- Milwaukee Mustangs (WR) (2012); Pittsburgh Power (WR) (2014)

Awards and highlights
- ArenaBowl champion (2005); 2× AFL Offensive Player of the Year (2005, 2006); Al Lucas Award (2005); 2× First-team All-Arena (2005, 2006); 3× Second-team All-Arena (2004, 2007, 2008); Arena Football Hall of Fame (2014)

Career AFL statistics
- Receptions: 1,164
- Receiving yards: 15,134
- Touchdowns: 358
- Stats at ArenaFan.com

Damian Deron Harrell (born September 1, 1975) is an American former professional football wide receiver who played in the Arena Football League (AFL) from 1999 to 2011 with the New England Sea Wolves, Toronto Phantoms, Colorado Crush, Chicago Rush, and Milwaukee Mustangs. He played college football at Florida State University.

Harrell was named AFL Offensive Player of the Year twice (2005 and 2006), first-team All-Arena twice (2005 and 2006), second-team All-Arena twice (2004 and 2007), AFL Offensive Player of the Month twice (February 2003 and April 2006), Offensive Player of the Game 24 times, and Game MVP 10 times. He also holds numerous AFL records.

== Early life ==
At South Miami Senior High School, Harrell lettered in both football and basketball. During his junior year, he was once struck by lightning during practice and was hospitalized for nearly two weeks. He returned to the field for the final three games of the season.

== College career ==
=== Community College career ===
Harrell attended the City College of San Francisco for two years. He finished his community college football career with 67 receptions for 1,160 yards (17.31 avg.), and seventeen touchdowns.

=== Florida State University ===
Harrell played two seasons at Florida State University (1995 and 1997), catching 36 career passes for 466 yards and four touchdowns, after transferring from City College of San Francisco. He red-shirted for the 1996 season after undergoing reconstructive surgery on his left knee. Harrell had 13 receptions for 178 yards and three touchdowns in his first season at Florida State. He recorded 23 receptions for 288 yards as a senior in 1997 but tore ligaments in his right knee in the season finale against Florida and missed the Seminoles win over Ohio State in the 1998 Sugar Bowl.

== Professional career ==
=== New England Sea Wolves (1999–2000) ===
In 1999, Harrell was signed by Mike Hohensee and the New England Sea Wolves on January 18, 1999. He made his league debut April 23 during a road game against the Florida Bobcats. He finished his rookie season with 25 receptions for 362 yards and nine touchdowns.

In 2000, Harrell played in the season's first seven games before suffering a broken left forearm during a road game in Buffalo and missing the rest of the season. He finished the season with 61 receptions for 808 yards and 18 touchdowns. He also rushed for two touchdowns and returned a kickoff return 48 yards for a touchdown. He was the league's leading receiver when his injury cost him the rest of the season.

=== Toronto Phantoms (2001–2002) ===
In 2001, Harrell moved with the Sea Wolves to Toronto. During the season, he recorded 98 passes for 1,340 yards and 20 touchdowns while playing in all 14 regular season games for the Toronto Phantoms. He finished the season ranked eighth in the AFL in receptions and fifth in receiving yards. He was named Game MVP three times during the regular season, and once in the playoffs. He had a season-high 10 receptions on the road against the Dragons and a season-high 140 yards receiving on the road against the Tampa Bay Storm.

Harrell re-signed with the Phantoms on March 20, 2002. In 2002, Harrell recorded 92 receptions for 1,277 yards and 19 touchdowns in 13 games, finishing the season ranked fifth in the league in receiving yards and sixth in receptions. He recorded seven passes for a season-high 145 yards and four touchdowns in an overtime loss to the Dragons on the final day of the season. He also had a season-high 10 receptions for 121 yards and a touchdown against the Indiana Firebirds.

=== Colorado Crush (2003–2007) ===
On December 12, 2002 Harrell signed with the Colorado Crush.

In 2003, he started 14 games, recording 97 receptions for 1,426 yards and 38 touchdowns. He finished the season ranked ninth in the league in receptions, eighth in receiving yards and fourth in scoring (234 points). He was placed on Injured Reserve and missed the season's final two weeks with a dislocated left wrist suffered on the final play of the team's overtime loss against the Predators. He caught a season-high 11 passes for 128 yards and two touchdowns on the road against the Las Vegas Gladiators. He was named the AFL's Offensive Player of the Month for February after catching 30 passes for 475 yards and 15 touchdowns in four games during the month. Harrell was voted MVP of the Game in Colorado's first game in franchise history, February 2 against the Force. He recorded eight receptions for 135 yards and five touchdowns.

In 2004, Harrell was voted Second Team All-Arena after recording 114 receptions for 1,715 yards and 43 touchdowns in 16 games. He finished the season ranked third in the league in receiving yards and scoring (258 points) and fifth in receptions. He was named Offensive Player of the Game seven times during the regular season and once in the playoffs. Harrell had 13 receptions for a career-high 208 yards and three touchdowns and was named Offensive Player of the Game on the road against the Detroit Fury. He was named Offensive Player of the Game after catching two touchdown passes in the game's final 12 seconds to lead the team to a season-opening 43-42 win against the Gladiators.

In 2005, Harrell was named AFL Offensive Player of the Year and First Team All-Arena after recording 122 receptions for 1,486 yards and 41 touchdowns and helping lead Colorado to the ArenaBowl XIX championship. He recorded eight receptions for 122 yards and two touchdowns in the ArenaBowl win over the Force. He recorded a season-high 13 receptions for 130 yards and four touchdowns on the road against the New Orleans VooDoo. He was named Offensive Player of the Game against the Los Angeles Avengers after recording 10 receptions for 135 yards and five touchdowns. He was also named Offensive Player of the Game three other times during the season, on the road against the Arizona Rattlers, against the Gladiators and against the Nashville Kats.

In 2006, Harrell was named AFL Offensive Player of the Year and First Team All-Arena for the second-consecutive season after setting career highs with 152 receptions for 1,920 yards and a league record 60 touchdowns in 16 games. He was named AFL Offensive Player of the Month for April after recording 56 receptions for 642 yards and 21 touchdowns in just five games. This stretch included an against the Predators in which he recorded a career-high 15 receptions for 172 yards and five touchdowns and broke the league's single season record for touchdowns, the old record was 46. Harrell was also voted AFL Offensive Player of the Week twice (Weeks 12 and 14) and named Offensive Player of the Game 10 times during the regular season.

In 2007, Harrell was voted Second Team All-Arena after recording 132 receptions for 1,547 yards and 47 touchdowns in 16 games. He finished the season tied for fourth in the league in receptions, fourth in scoring (282 points) and seventh in receiving yards. He was named Offensive Player of the Game for the third time, against the Gladiators after recording nine receptions for 91 yards and four touchdowns. He had 10 receptions for 159 yards and a season-high six touchdowns on the road against the Chicago Rush. He recorded a season-high 14 receptions for a season-high 181 yards and three touchdowns on the road against the Philadelphia Soul. He was then named Offensive Player of the Game after recording 10 receptions for 154 yards and four touchdowns against the Rattlers. Harrell was named Offensive Player of the Game after recording eight receptions for 95 yards and three touchdowns in a season-opening loss to the Grand Rapids Rampage.

=== Chicago Rush (2008) ===
On November 2, 2007, Harrell signed a three-year contract with the Chicago Rush. He began the 2008 season ranked second in league history in touchdown receptions (295), third in receiving yards (11,881) and fourth in receptions (893). He also ranked second in career 100-yard receiving games (58) and fourth in career five touchdown games (13).

In 2008, Harrell appeared in 15 games for the Rush, recording 94 receptions for 1,173 yards 25 touchdowns. In Week 2, he recorded his season high in receiving touchdowns with three. During Week 13 against the Utah Blaze, he tied his season-high in receptions with 10, and recorded a season-high 147 yards.

Harrell finished the season ranked fourth in league history in receptions (987), third in receiving yards (13,075), and first in receiving touchdowns (321). However, on August 28, 2008, he was released by the Rush.

=== Milwaukee (2010–2011) ===
After taking a year off, Harrell returned to the game as member of the Milwaukee Iron in 2010. His first season with the team, he pulled in 100 receptions for 1,258 yards and 28 touchdowns.

In 2011, the Iron changed their names to the Milwaukee Mustangs, and Harrell was once again a member of the team. Harrell had since become the AFL's all time best receiver, as he now ranks 1st in receptions (1,164), receiving yards (12,134) and touchdowns (358).

== Coaching career ==
=== Milwaukee Mustangs (2012) ===
Following his retirement from playing, Harrell went right into coaching in 2012 as the wide receivers coach for the Mustangs. When the Mustangs suspended operations at the end of the 2012 season, Harrell stopped coaching.

=== Pittsburgh Power (2014) ===
Harrell joined the Pittsburgh Power in 2014 as the team's wide receivers coach.

== Personal ==
Harrell, along with his wife, Melani live in Denver during the off-season. They have two children, Deron and Malia. In May 1998, he received a bachelor's degree in criminology from Florida State University.
