= Altitude Sports =

Canadian e-commerce clothing company

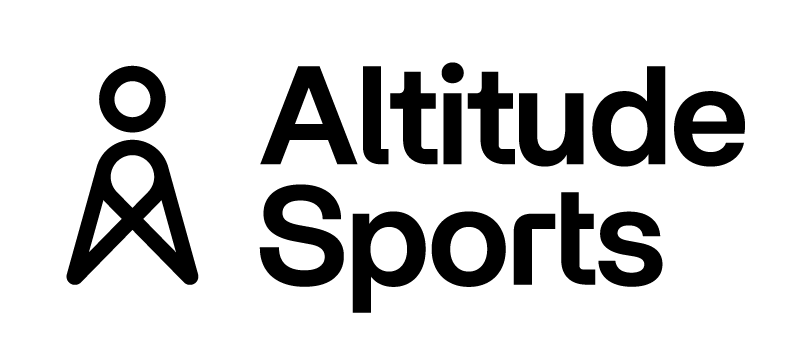
- Type: Privately held
- Industry: Fashion; Outerwear; Sports clothing; Hiking apparel; Outdoor equipment
- Founded: 1984 (as Altitude Sports Plein Air)
- Headquarters: Montreal, Québec, Canada
- Number of locations: e-commerce
- Area served: worldwide
- Website: www.altitude-sports.com

Altitude Sports is an outdoor e-commerce clothing company that sells and manufactures a wide range of sports outerwear, outdoor equipment and urban wear, focusing on travel, hiking, and camping. The company was founded in 1984 and its headquarters is located in Montreal, Canada.

== History ==
The retailer's first store opened on Montreal's St. Denis Street in 1984. The company was known as Altitude Sports Plein Air, selling and renting outdoor equipment and clothing for outdoor activities. The Altitude-sports.com website was created in 1999 and was one of the first online outdoor retail sites in Canada. The Last Hunt, a sister outlet site, opened in 2010. In 2011, the company was acquired by Alexandre Guimond and Maxime Dubois, employees who became majority owners after the purchase. 2016 saw Altitude Sports partner with Quartz Co. and Monark to design and produce the world's first parkas insulated with milkweed.

In 2016, revenue from the bricks-and-mortar retail stores made up only 2% of the company's total sales, with most of the business being generated online. The St. Denis Street store closed in 2016, the beginning of a shift to a 100% online retailer. In early 2018, BDC Capital became a minority shareholder of Altitude Sports. In the fall of 2019, with items from 430 brands available, the company expanded, creating an online marketplace. In September 2019, Altitude Sports launched its first ready-to-wear collection, Vallier, which included coats, t-shirts, socks, sweaters. According to a number of sources, the collection is for the most part made from sustainable materials such as organic cotton, Japanese wool and others.

== Collections ==
- Vallier (2019)

== Charitable endeavors ==
The company's environmental initiatives included cooperation with The World Wildlife Foundation Canada (WWF - Canada), and Protect Our Winters Canada (POW). Altitude Sports has also partnered with The Trans Canada Trail (TCT) as part of initiatives addressing nature conservation and climate change issues.
