= Dion Byrum =

American football player (born 1983)

No. 1
- Position: Cornerback

Personal information
- Born: February 18, 1983 (age 43); Matthews, North Carolina, U.S.

Career information
- College: Ohio
- NFL draft: 2006: undrafted

Career history
- 2006: Chicago Bears
- 2006: Tampa Bay Buccaneers
- 2006: Carolina Panthers
- 2008: Orlando Predators
- 2008: Colorado Crush
- 2010: Orlando Predators

Awards and highlights
- First-team All-American (2005)
- Stats at Pro Football Reference

Dion Byrum (born February 18, 1983) is an American former professional football player who was a cornerback in the National Football League (NFL).

== Early life ==
A two-time all-conference and all-county performer playing both ways, Byrum rushed for 1,972 yards and 25 touchdowns on 244 carries as a senior at Monroe High School. He was voted team's Most Improved Player as a junior, then MVP his final season. He earned three letters each in football, basketball and track while being a member of the Varsity Club and Key Club.

== College career ==
At Ohio University, Dion Byrum earned All-American honors from the American Football Coaches Association following his senior year. He also was named second-team All-American by Sports Illustrated, second-team All-American by the Associated Press, and first-team All-Mid-American Conference. He finished his senior campaign tied for first in MAC and second nationally with six interceptions and ran back two of those for touchdowns. His 153 total interception return yardage was second in the nation, while his three defensive touchdowns ranked first.

Byrum secured his place in Bobcat lore during a game against the #24 Pittsburgh Panthers, in which Byrum had two interception returns for touchdowns off Tyler Palko. The second return of 85 yards came in overtime, immediately ending the game. The game was nationally televised on ESPN2 and was the first major victory for new head coach Frank Solich, sparking hopes of improvement for Ohio Bobcats football after several years of poor results. Students began rushing the field even before Byrum crossed the goal line, and the ensuing celebration was so raucous that students were later chastised for setting fires in the streets.

== Professional career ==
Byrum was first signed by the Chicago Bears as an undrafted free agent after four years of college football with the Ohio Bobcats, but was released by the Bears on September 1, 2006. He went on to sign with the Bucs practice squad, but was later released. Byrum was signed to the Panthers' roster on November 16, 2006. He was waived from the Panthers roster on August 3, 2007, to make room for safety Chris Harris. Byrum then continued on to the Arena Football League (AFL) where he signed with the Orlando Predators. He was signed by the Colorado Crush off of the Orlando Practice squad on April 22, 2008. In his first game with the Crush, he led the team with 5 tackles.
