= Chad Owens =

American football player (born 1982)

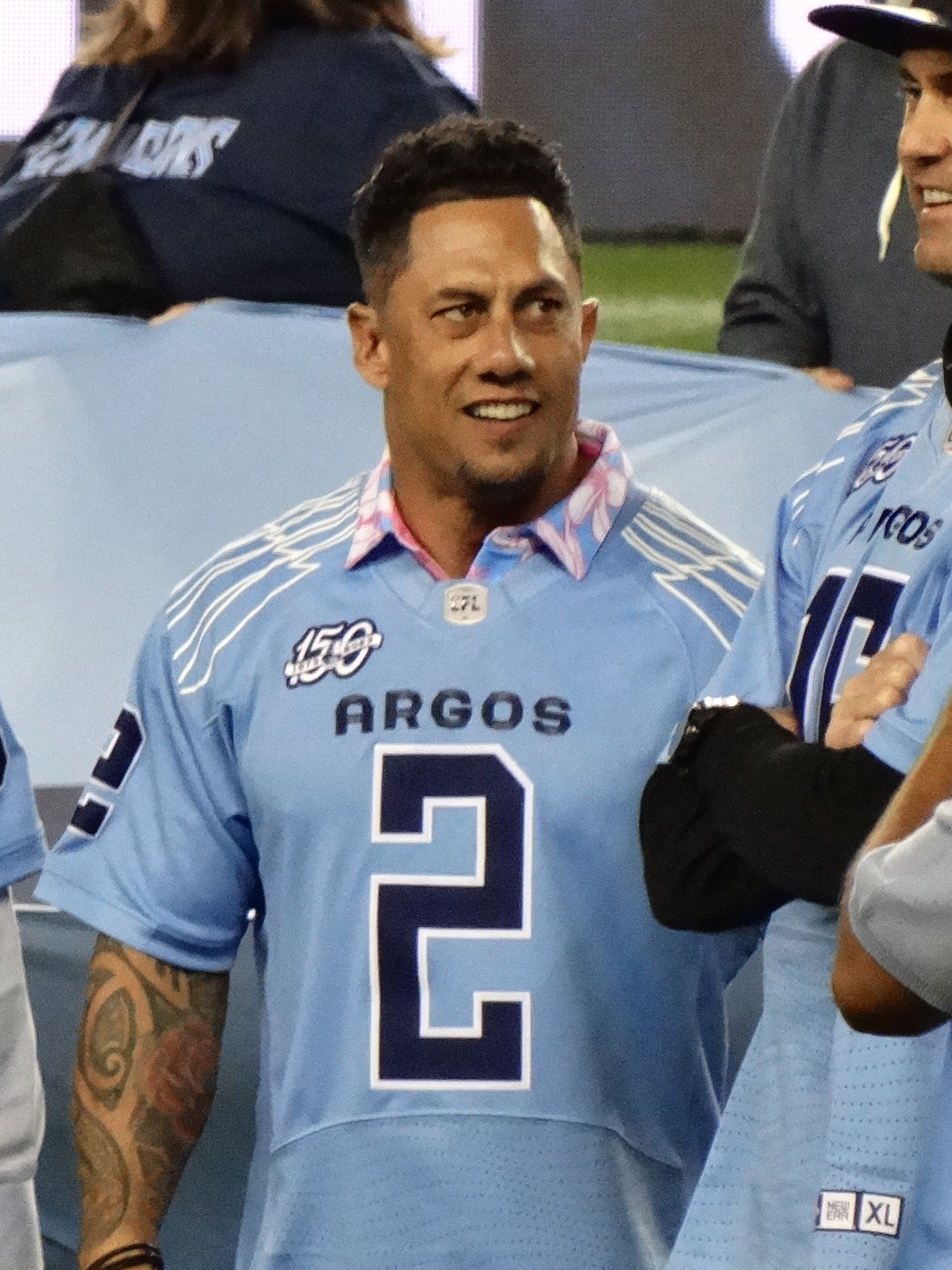
- Owens in 2023

No. 4, 2
- Positions: Wide receiver, Kick returner

Personal information
- Born: April 3, 1982 (age 44); Honolulu, Hawaii, U.S.
- Listed height: 5 ft 8 in (1.73 m)
- Listed weight: 180 lb (82 kg)

Career information
- College: Hawaii
- NFL draft: 2005: 6th round, 185th overall pick

Career history
- 2005–2006: Jacksonville Jaguars
- 2007: Tampa Bay Buccaneers*
- 2007: Jacksonville Jaguars
- 2008: Colorado Crush
- 2009: Montreal Alouettes
- 2010–2015: Toronto Argonauts
- 2016: Hamilton Tiger-Cats
- 2017: Saskatchewan Roughriders
- 2018: Hamilton Tiger-Cats*
- * Offseason or practice squad member only

Awards and highlights
- 2× Grey Cup champion (2009, 2012); CFL record for most all-purpose yards in a regular season: 3,863 (2012); CFL's Most Outstanding Player Award (2012); Terry Evanshen Trophy (2012); John Agro Special Teams Award (2010); 4× CFL All-Star (2010–2012, 2014); 5× CFL East All-Star (2010–2014); AFL All-Rookie Team (2008); Mosi Tatupu Award (2004); Second-team All-American (2004); NCAA receiving touchdowns leader (2004)

Career CFL statistics
- Games played: 105
- Receptions: 521
- Receiving yards: 6,217
- Return yards: 10,309
- Total touchdowns: 35
- Stats at Pro Football Reference
- Stats at CFL.ca
- Canadian Football Hall of Fame (Class of 2024)

Chad Owens Sr. (born April 3, 1982) is an American former professional football player who was a wide receiver and kick returner for three years in the National Football League (NFL) and nine years in the Canadian Football League (CFL). He was selected by the Jacksonville Jaguars in the sixth round of the 2005 NFL draft. Owens played college football for the Hawaii Warriors. He spent six seasons playing for the Toronto Argonauts, and was also a member of the Montreal Alouettes, Hamilton Tiger-Cats, and Saskatchewan Roughriders. Owens is also a professional bodybuilder who competes in the IFBB Men's Physique Division.

== Early life ==
Owens attended Roosevelt High School in Honolulu, Hawaii, and he was a three-sport letter-winner and star in football, basketball, and Track. In football, as a senior, he was an all—OIA white division selection, and an All-State honourable mention. As a sophomore, he garnered first-team All-OIA Red Division honours, and All-State honourable-mention accolades. He was also a basketball star and as a senior, he led his team to the OIA state basketball championship. He has three children: Chad Jr., Areana, and Sierra-Lynn with his wife, Rena Owens. They've been together for 25 years, married for 15 years.

== College career ==
Owens became a bigger star after joining the football team at the University of Hawaiʻi at Mānoa as a wide receiver, punt returner and kick returner. He became the featured receiver in June Jones's run & shoot offense, and became the number one receiver for quarterback Timmy Chang. Owens was instrumental on the Warriors teams that won both the Hawaii Bowl in 2003 and 2004 by beating the University of Houston and the University of Alabama at Birmingham.

- Hawaii's All-time Career Yardage Leader With 5,461 All-purpose Yards
- Gained 3,031 receiving yards (6th in school history) and 29 touchdowns (5th) in 44 games,
- Awarded the Mosi Tatupu Award for best Special Teams Player in 2004
- Led the nation with 17 receiving touchdowns in 2004
- Led the nation with 5 punt returns for a touchdown in 2004

== Professional career ==
=== Jacksonville Jaguars ===
Owens was cut by the Jacksonville Jaguars after his NFL debut against the Indianapolis Colts where he muffed three punts. He was re-signed to the Jaguars' practice squad a few days later.

Playing with the Jaguars in his first pre-season game of the 2006 season, Owens caught a 62-yard pass and scored his first NFL touchdown.

=== Colorado Crush ===
Owens signed with agent Richard "Bruno" Burnoski and signed a contract with the Colorado Crush of the Arena Football League. Owens got off to a fast start with the Crush, generating over 1,600 combined yards (receiving and returns) but tore his ACL, ending his season after nine games.

=== Montreal Alouettes ===
On July 14, 2009, Owens signed a practice roster agreement with the Montreal Alouettes. He was released on October 1. He was re-signed to the practice roster on October 8 and was considered a part of the 97th Grey Cup Championship team for participating in a game during the regular season.

=== Toronto Argonauts ===
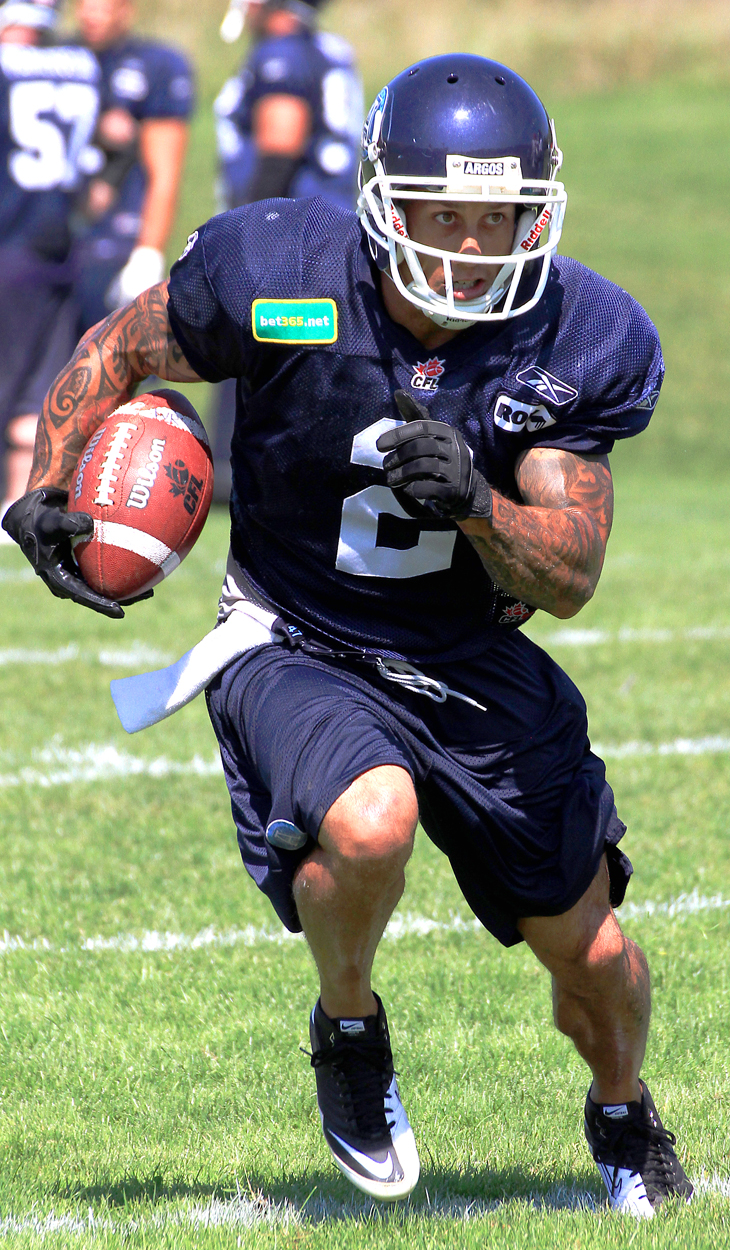
Owens during a practice session in September 2012

On June 24, 2010, the Toronto Argonauts acquired Owens from the Alouettes in exchange for a fourth-round pick in the 2011 CFL draft.

On November 25, 2010, Owens was named the most outstanding special teams player in the Canadian Football League for the 2010 season. Owens was a unanimous selection after leading the CFL in punt, kickoff, missed field goal returns and all-purpose yards and finishing tied for the league lead in return touchdowns (four). He became just the fifth player in league history to have over 1,000 punt and kick return yards in a season.

On November 1, 2012, in the final regular-season game against the Hamilton Tiger-Cats, Owens set the all-time record for all-purpose yards in a single season, surpassing Pinball Clemons' 1997 total of 3,840 yards. Owens did so with a 29-yard kickoff return halfway through the 2nd quarter. He finished the season with 3863 all-purpose yards, setting not only a CFL record, but also a professional football record as well. In his third full season in Toronto, Owens became the first player in professional football to record at least 3,000 combined yards in back-to-back seasons.

On November 22, 2012, Owens won the CFL Most Outstanding Player Award finishing ahead of Calgary Stampeders running back Jon Cornish in voting conducted by the Football Reporters of Canada as well as the eight CFL head coaches. On November 25, 2012, Owens and the Argonauts finished the 2012 season with the 100th Grey Cup Championship. Owens was rated the best player in the league on the TSN Top 50 players of 2012.

On June 8, 2013, the Argos and Owens agreed to a two-year contract extension. The deal was rumoured to make Owens the highest-paid non-quarterback in the CFL. The Argonauts did not re-sign Owens at the conclusion of the 2015 CFL season, rendering Owens a free agent.

=== Hamilton Tiger-Cats (first stint) ===
On February 11, 2016, Owens agreed to a one-year contract with the Hamilton Tiger-Cats as a free agent. Subsequently, it was announced on October 4, after playing 12 games with the Tiger-Cats, that Owens would miss the remainder of the 2016 CFL season due to a broken foot he sustained in a game against the Montreal Alouettes. He would subsequently re-enter Free Agency after only a season with the organization.

=== Saskatchewan Roughriders ===
On February 15, 2017, Owens agreed to a two-year deal with the Saskatchewan Roughriders. It was announced, on June 21, 2017, that Owens was placed on the six-game injured list due to an apparent foot injury he likely sustained while with the Tiger-Cats.

Owens made his Roughriders debut on October 20, 2017, in a winning effort against the Calgary Stampeders recording five receptions with seventy eight yards. Despite his strong performance at the end of the 2017 Saskatchewan Roughriders campaign, he was part of final roster cuts for the Riders on June 9, 2018. His age and performance relative to younger players are believed to be contributing factors affecting the decision to cut ties with the player.

=== Hamilton Tiger-Cats (second stint) ===
Owens returned to the Tiger-Cats when he signed a practice roster deal on September 11, 2018. He was released on October 1, 2018, without having played in a game.

Owens was announced as a member of the Canadian Football Hall of Fame 2024 class on May 3, 2024, and inducted on September 14, 2024, at Tim Hortons Field.

== Career statistics ==
=== NFL ===
Year	Team	G	Receiving							Rushing					Fumbles	
Year	Team	G	Rec	Yds	Avg	Lng	YAC	1stD	TD	Att	Yds	Avg	Lng	TD	Fum	Lost
2005	JAX	1	0	0	0.0	0	0	0	0	0	0	0.0	0	0	1	1
2006	JAX	4	0	0	0.0	0	0	0	0	0	0	0.0	0	0	0	0
2007	JAX	1	0	0	0.0	0	0	0	0	0	0	0.0	0	0	2	0

=== AFL ===
Year	Team	Receptions	Receiving yards	Yards per reception	Receiving touchdowns
2008	Colorado Crush	61	640	10.5	10

=== CFL ===
		Receiving						Rushing
Year	Team	GP	Rec	Yards	Avg	Long	TD	Car	Yards	Avg	Long	TD
2009	MTL	1	1	10	10.0	10	0	0	0	0.0	0	0
2010	TOR	17	46	576	12.5	63	3	1	11	11.0	11	0
2011	TOR	17	70	722	10.3	48	0	3	14	4.7	8	0
2012	TOR	18	94	1,328	14.1	60	6	6	25	4.2	8	0
2013	TOR	13	94	979	10.4	37	2	9	51	5.7	18	0
2014	TOR	11	86	989	11.5	69	7	3	28	9.3	16	0
2015	TOR	13	55	570	10.4	42	3	2	8	4.0	5	0
2016	HAM	12	58	808	13.9	51	5	1	3	3.0	3	0
2017	SSK	3	17	235	13.8	27	1	4	32	8.0	10	0
CFL totals		105	521	6,217	11.6	69	27	29	172	5.9	18	0

=== College ===
Legend
	Led the NCAA
**Bold**	Career high

Year	Team	Receptions	Receiving yards	Yards per reception	Receiving touchdowns
2001	Hawaii Warriors	5	57	11.4	1
2002	Hawaii Warriors	47	550	11.7	2
2003	Hawaii Warriors	85	1,134	**13.3**	9
2004	Hawaii Warriors	**102**	**1,290**	12.6	**17**
TOTAL		239	3,031	12.7	29

== MMA career ==
In the off-season following the 2012 CFL season, Owens decided to pursue MMA as a form of off-season training. Then Argos GM Jim Barker openly expressed his displeasure with Owens's fighting in MMA, and was quoted as saying, "I think he's making a bad decision, our organization thinks he's making a bad decision". On April 6, 2013, Owens defeated Junya Tevaga by unanimous decision in an amateur bout. The organization that oversaw the fight was Destiny MMA.

== Personal life ==
In January 2015, Owens moved from Hawaii to Canada full-time; but has now relocated back to his home of Oahu (Honolulu), Hawai'i Owens also competes in Bodybuilding and was the 2022 Men's Physique Overall Champion at the Shawn Ray Hawaiian Classic. In 2024 Owen's won his IFBB Pro Card at NPC North Americans in Pittsburgh, Pennsylvania.

== See also ==
- List of Canadian Football League records (individual)
- List of NCAA major college football yearly receiving leaders
