= John Syptak =

American gridiron football player (born 1984)

No. 59
- Position: Defensive lineman

Personal information
- Born: March 16, 1984 (age 42); Houston, Texas
- Listed height: 6 ft 1 in (1.85 m)
- Listed weight: 253 lb (115 kg)

Career information
- High school: Bellville (TX)
- College: Rice
- NFL draft: 2006: undrafted

Career history
- Seattle Seahawks (2006)*; New Orleans Saints (2006)*; San Francisco 49ers (2007)*; Frankfurt Galaxy (2007); Calgary Stampeders (2007); Colorado Crush (2008)
- * Offseason or practice squad member only

Career CFL statistics
- Tackles: 4
- Sacks: 1

Career AFL statistics
- Tackles: 12
- Sacks: 3
- Forced fumbles: 2
- Stats at ArenaFan.com

John Ashley Syptak (born March 16, 1984) is an American former football defensive lineman who played for the Colorado Crush of the Arena Football League, the San Francisco 49ers and the New Orleans Saints of the National Football League.

== Early life ==
Syptak attended Bellville High School in Bellville, Texas. He was a good student, a standout in football and baseball, and a member of the National Honor Society, Latin Club, Boy's State, and the Fellowship of Christian Athletes. He won Bellville's Citizenship Award.

In football, he was a two-time team captain, and as a junior, he was named his team's Most Valuable Defensive Lineman. As a senior, he was named as a first-team All-Tri County selection, named the Austin County Defensive Player of the Year, and selected as the District 25-3A Defensive Player of the Year.

In baseball, he was a four-year letterman, a four-time Academic All-District selection, and as a junior, he was an All-District selection.

Syptak graduated in 2002 as the valedictorian of his graduating class.
