= 2005 Arena Football League season =

- League: Arena Football League
- Sport: Arena football
- Duration: January 28, 2005 – June 12, 2005

Regular season
- Season champions: Georgia Force

AFL playoffs
- National Conference champions: Georgia Force
- National Conference runners-up: Orlando Predators
- American Conference champions: Colorado Crush
- American Conference runners-up: Chicago Rush

ArenaBowl XIX
- Champions: Colorado Crush
- Runners-up: Georgia Force
- Finals MVP: Willis Marshall & Ahmad Hawkins, COL

AFL seasons
- ← 2004 2006 →

National: Eastern, Southern
American: Western, Central

The 2005 Arena Football League season was the 19th season of the Arena Football League. The league champions were the Colorado Crush, who defeated the Georgia Force in ArenaBowl XIX. The AFL changed its playoff format to allow the top four teams per conference to make the playoffs. Previously, the top eight teams in the league make the playoffs, regardless of their conference. Also, there was no inter-conference play in the playoffs until the Arena Bowl starting in 2005. The division champions also received an automatic playoff berth. This was probably brought on by the fact that the year before the Eastern Division champion New York Dragons missed the playoffs.

== Standings ==
Team	Overall				Division		
Team	Wins	Losses	Ties	Percentage	Wins	Losses	Percentage
National Conference
Eastern Division
New York Dragons	10	6	0	0.625	6	0	1.000
Dallas Desperados	8	7	1	0.531	4	2	0.667
Philadelphia Soul	6	10	0	0.375	1	5	0.167
Columbus Destroyers	2	14	0	0.125	1	5	0.167
Southern Division
Georgia Force	11	5	0	0.687	6	2	0.750
Orlando Predators	10	6	0	0.625	5	3	0.625
Tampa Bay Storm	10	6	0	0.625	5	3	0.625
New Orleans VooDoo	9	7	0	0.562	2	6	0.250
Austin Wranglers	6	10	0	0.375	2	6	0.250
American Conference
Central Division
Colorado Crush	10	6	0	0.625	3	3	0.500
Chicago Rush	9	7	0	0.562	5	1	0.833
Nashville Kats	6	9	1	0.406	2	4	0.333
Grand Rapids Rampage	4	12	0	0.250	2	4	0.333
Western Division
Los Angeles Avengers	10	6	0	0.625	5	1	0.833
San Jose SaberCats	9	7	0	0.562	3	3	0.500
Las Vegas Gladiators	8	8	0	0.500	2	4	0.333
Arizona Rattlers	7	9	0	0.438	2	4	0.333

- Green indicates clinched playoff berth
- Purple indicates division champion
- Grey indicates best conference record

== Playoffs ==
All games televised by NBC.

Conference Semifinals
1	Georgia	62
4	Tampa Bay	46
National Conference
2	New York	42
3	Orlando	47
1	Colorado	56
4	San Jose	48
American Conference
2	Los Angeles	45
3	Chicago	52

Conference Finals
1	Georgia	60
3	Orlando	58
1	Colorado (OT)	49
3	Chicago	43

ArenaBowl XIX
N1	Georgia	48
A1	Colorado	51

== All-Arena team ==
Position	First team	Second team
Quarterback	Mark Grieb, San Jose	Matt Nagy, Georgia
Fullback/Linebacker	Frank Carter, Las Vegas	Rich Young, Colorado
Wide receiver/Linebacker	Cory Fleming, Orlando	Lawrence Samuels, Tampa Bay
Wide receiver/Defensive back	Kevin Ingram, Los Angeles	Will Pettis, Dallas
Offensive specialist	Damian Harrell, Colorado	Siaha Burley, Arizona
Offensive lineman/Defensive lineman	Silas DeMary, Los Angeles; B.J Cohen, New Orleans; Jermaine Smith, Georgia	Gillis Wilson, Georgia; E.J. Burt, Orlando; John Moyer, Chicago
Defensive specialist	Billy Parker, New York; Kenny McEntyre, Orlando	Kahlil Carter, Nashville; Kevin Gaines, Georgia
Kicker	Remy Hamilton, Los Angeles	Clay Rush, Colorado
