= ArenaBowl XIX =

2005 arena football game in Nevada, US

Georgia Force (National)	Colorado Crush (American)
48	51
	1	2	3	4	Total
GEO	7	13	7	21	48
COL	10	14	7	20	51
- Date: June 12, 2005
- Stadium: Thomas & Mack Center; Paradise, Nevada
- MVP: Willis Marshall, WR/DB, Colorado: Willis Marshall, WR/DB, Colorado (Offensive Player of the Game); Ahmad Hawkins, DS, Colorado (Defensive Player of the Game); Willis Marshall, WR/DB, Colorado (Ironman of the Game)
- Attendance: 10,822
- Winning coach: Mike Dailey
- Losing coach: Doug Plank

TV in the United States
- Network: NBC
- Announcers: Tom Hammond, Pat Haden, Lewis Johnson and Marty Snider

ArenaBowl XIX was the 2005 championship game of the Arena Football League (AFL), and was played at the Thomas & Mack Center in Paradise, Nevada. The first neutral-site title game in AFL history drew 10,822 fans to see the Colorado Crush defeat the Georgia Force 51–48 to claim the Foster ArenaBowl Trophy.

== Game summary ==
In a matchup of two first-time ArenaBowl participants (not counting the Force's appearances in ArenaBowls XIV and XV as the Nashville Kats, as those games are attributed to the new Kats franchise), the Crush claimed the Foster ArenaBowl Trophy in just their third year of existence.

The Crush got out to a 7–0 lead on the first of four touchdowns by Willis Marshall and added a Clay Rush field goal to extend the lead to 10–0 before the Force got on the scoreboard. The teams then traded touchdowns throughout the remainder of the first half, with the Crush leading 24–20 at the break. The first half was especially notable for being the first time in ArenaBowl history in which neither team threw a passing touchdown.

Crush quarterback John Dutton, the MVP of ArenaBowl XVI, and Force signal-caller Matt Nagy would soon change that, however, as the two combined for seven passing touchdowns in the second half. Rookie Derek Lee caught three touchdown passes in the half for Georgia, but it was not enough to offset the Colorado attack, as Dutton threw two touchdowns to Damian Harrell and another to Marshall

With 18 seconds remaining, Nagy threw a 20-yard touchdown pass to Chris Jackson, tying the game at 48. However, the Crush quickly moved into field goal range, and kicker Rush converted his third field goal of the day, this one from 20 yards out as time expired, giving Colorado its first ArenaBowl title with a 51-48 win.

Marshall was named both Offensive Player of the Game and Ironman of the Game, with six catches for 111 yards and one touchdown in addition to three rushing touchdowns. Ahmad Hawkins earned Defensive Player of the Game honors by registering the game's lone interception.

Colorado coach Mike Dailey earned his second championship ring while Georgia's first-year head coach Doug Plank, the league's 2005 Coach of the Year, came up short in his fourth consecutive ArenaBowl, having lost the previous three as the defensive coordinator for the Arizona Rattlers.

== Scoring summary ==
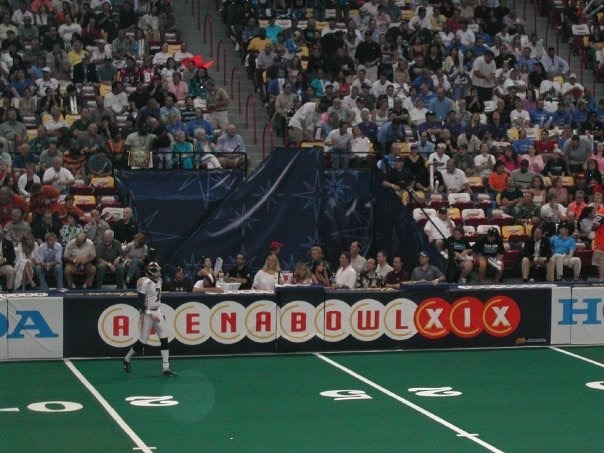
ArenaBowl XIX

1st Quarter

- COL – Marshall 1 run (Rush kick)
- COL – FG Rush 20
- GA – Nagy 1 run (Garner kick)

2nd Quarter

- COL – Marshall 4 run (Rush kick)
- GA – Aldridge 27 run (Garner kick failed)
- COL – Marshall 3 run (Rush kick)
- GA – Thomas 2 run (Garner kick)

3rd Quarter

- COL – Harrell 12 pass from Dutton (Rush kick)
- GA – Lee 2 pass from Nagy (Garner kick)

4th Quarter

- COL – FG Rush 26
- GA – Lee 34 pass from Nagy (Garner kick)
- COL – Marshall 45 pass from Dutton (Rush kick)
- GA – Lee 27 pass from Nagy (Garner kick)
- COL – Harrell 30 pass from Dutton (Rush kick)
- GA – Jackson 20 pass from Nagy (Garner kick)
- COL – FG Rush 20

== Trivia ==
- On the Arena Football League's 20 Greatest Highlights Countdown (which was shown on arenafooball.com during the AFL's 20th season) this game is tied at #17.
