= 2004 Arena Football League season =

- League: Arena Football League
- Sport: Arena football
- Duration: February 5, 2004 – June 27, 2004

ArenaBowl XVIII
- Champions: San Jose SaberCats
- Runners-up: Arizona Rattlers
- Finals MVP: Mark Grieb, SJ

AFL seasons
- ← 2003 2005 →

National: Eastern, Southern
American: Western, Central

The 2004 Arena Football League season was the 18th season of the Arena Football League. It was succeeded by 2005. The league champions were the San Jose SaberCats, who defeated the Arizona Rattlers in ArenaBowl XVIII. The AFL reduced its playoff teams from the top 12 teams in the league making the playoffs to the top eight teams in the league making the playoffs.

== Standings ==
Team	Overall			Division		
Team	Wins	Losses	Percentage	Wins	Losses	Percentage
National Conference
Eastern Division
New York Dragons*	9	7	0.562	5	3	0.625
Carolina Cobras	6	10	0.375	4	4	0.500
Dallas Desperados	6	10	0.375	4	4	0.500
Columbus Destroyers	6	10	0.375	3	5	0.375
Philadelphia Soul	5	11	0.312	4	4	0.500
Southern Division
New Orleans VooDoo	11	5	0.687	5	3	0.625
Orlando Predators	10	6	0.625	4	4	0.500
Tampa Bay Storm	9	7	0.562	5	3	0.625
Austin Wranglers	8	8	0.500	3	5	0.375
Georgia Force	7	9	0.438	3	5	0.375
American Conference
Central Division
Chicago Rush	11	5	0.687	6	2	0.750
Colorado Crush	11	5	0.687	5	3	0.625
Indiana Firebirds	8	8	0.500	5	3	0.625
Detroit Fury	5	11	0.312	3	5	0.375
Grand Rapids Rampage	1	15	0.062	1	7	0.125
Western Division
Arizona Rattlers	11	5	0.687	4	2	0.667
San Jose SaberCats	11	5	0.687	3	3	0.500
Los Angeles Avengers	9	7	0.562	3	3	0.500
Las Vegas Gladiators	8	8	0.500	2	4	0.333

- Green indicates clinched playoff berth
- Purple indicates division champion
- Grey indicates best regular season record

* New York Dragons won the Eastern Division, but did not make the playoffs as only the top 8 teams qualified. The AFL reverted to the old rule in the following season in that Division Champions get an automatic bid to the playoffs for the following season.

== Playoffs ==
All games televised by NBC

Quarterfinals
1	Arizona	59
8	Los Angeles	42
4	New Orleans	44
5	Colorado	47
2	San Jose	56
7	Tampa Bay	52
3	Chicago	59
6	Orlando	49

Semifinals
1	Arizona	45
5	Colorado	41
2	San Jose	49
3	Chicago	35

ArenaBowl XVIII
1	Arizona	62
2	San Jose	69

== All-Arena team ==
Position	First team	Second team
Quarterback	Tony Graziani, Los Angeles	Mark Grieb, San Jose
Fullback/Linebacker	Dan Curran, New Orleans	Rupert Grant, Orlando
Wide receiver/Defensive back	Kevin Ingram, Los Angeles	Will Pettis, Dallas
Wide receiver/Linebacker	Cory Fleming, Orlando	Lawrence Samuels, Tampa Bay
Offensive specialist	Marcus Nash, Las Vegas	Damian Harrell, Colorado
Offensive lineman/Defensive lineman	Tom Briggs, Austin; John Moyer, Chicago; Bryan Henderson, Arizona	Tim Martin, New Orleans; Jermaine Smith, Orlando; Nyle Wiren, Tampa Bay
Defensive specialist	Omarr Smith, San Jose; Kenny McEntyre, Orlando	Rashad Floyd, Colorado; Kevin Gaines, Georgia
Kicker	Jay Taylor, Orlando	Remy Hamilton, Los Angeles
