= Colorado Crush =

Arena football team

Logo

General information
- Founded: 2003
- Folded: 2008
- Headquartered: Ball Arena in Denver, Colorado
- Colors: Navy, burnt orange, beige
- Mascot: Crusher

Personnel
- Owners: John Elway; Pat Bowlen; Stan Kroenke
- General manager: John Elway
- Head coach: Mike Dailey

Team history
- Colorado Crush (2003–2008)

Home fields
- Ball Arena (2003–2008)

League / conference affiliations
- Arena Football League (2003–2008): American Conference (2003–2008); Western (2003); Central (2004–2008)

Championships
- League championships: 1: 2005
- Conference championships: 1: 2005; Prior to 2005, the AFL did not have conference championship games
- Division championships: 2: Central: 2005, 2006

Playoff appearances (5)
- 2004, 2005, 2006, 2007, 2008

The Colorado Crush were an arena football team based in Denver, Colorado. They began play as a 2003 Arena Football League expansion team. The Crush played in the Central Division of the American Conference until the Arena Football League suspended operations in 2009. They were last coached by Mike Dailey and owned by a coalition of Denver sports figures led by John Elway.

Negotiations with a Denver ownership group were underway for a future AFL expansion franchise in Denver, but it was unclear whether or not it will use the Crush branding or that of the Denver Dynamite, an earlier AFL team. Like the Dallas Desperados, the Crush's branding is partially based on NFL teams (the Denver Broncos and St. Louis Rams, though to a much lesser degree), which would have given the late Pat Bowlen or Stan Kroenke a potential veto over any usage of the Colorado Crush branding. On July 15, 2015, the Crush name was acquired by the Indoor Football League franchise formerly known as the Colorado Ice as the trademark for the name expired in 2014 according to their ownership.

== History ==
On August 8, 2001, the team entered an application for expansion into the Arena Football League. In June 2002, it was announced that John Elway (Co-Owner and Chief Executive Officer), with Stan Kroenke, owner of the Avalanche, the Nuggets, the Rapids, Pepsi Center, & the Altitude Sports network and the majority Broncos owner Pat Bowlen would be bringing an arena football team to Denver. The Crush competed in the Central Division of the American Conference. After a bad inaugural season in 2003, in which they finished 2-14, the Crush rebounded to go 11–5 and make the playoffs in their second year. On June 12, 2005 they won ArenaBowl XIX (19) in Las Vegas' Thomas & Mack Center over the Georgia Force 51–48, in only their third year of existence.

In their fourth year the Crush ended up 11–5, with the American Conference Central title for the second year in a row. In the divisional round, however, the Crush lost in an upset to the fifth-seeded (and eventual ArenaBowl champion) Chicago Rush 63–46.

The team's mascot was an anthropomorphic bull named "Crusher."

On July 15, 2015, the Indoor Football League franchise previously known as the Colorado Ice announced that they would change their name to the Colorado Crush, but would have no ties to the former AFL franchise. According to team owner Tom Wigley, the trademark of the Crush name expired the year before meaning that the original Crush ownership no longer had a say in the use of the name.

== Highlights ==
- In the 2005 American Conference Championship game against their division rival, the Chicago Rush. Colorado had the lead late in the game 43–40, and defensive back Rashad Floyd intercepted a touchdown pass by quarterback Matt D'Orazio in what appeared to be the last play of the game, to the point that arena staff had fired confetti cannons to celebrate the Crush's win. However, Floyd was called for holding, and time was placed back on the clock. After a delay to sweep the confetti from the field, Keith Gispert kicked a 17-yard field goal for Chicago to force overtime. Colorado QB John Dutton completed a 22-yard touchdown pass to WR/LB Antowone 'Andy' McCullough to win the game, sending them to ArenaBowl XIX (where they would eventually win).
- On February 6, 2004, in a Week 1 contest against the Las Vegas Gladiators, the Crush were still looking for their first home win in franchise history. In the final 12 seconds of the game, the Crush would have quarterback John Dutton complete a seven-yard touchdown pass to wide receiver Damian Harrell (with a failed two-point conversion), recover an onside kick, and have Dutton complete a 33-yard pass to Harrell. With 12 points in 12 seconds, Colorado would win 43–42 and get their first-ever win at home. On the AFL's 20 Greatest Highlights Countdown, this is at #15.
- On Saturday, February 5, 2005, in a Week 2 home game against their division rival, the Grand Rapids Rampage, quarterback John Dutton would throw a franchise-best eight touchdowns in a 72–56 win, yet this was overshadowed by Rampage quarterback Michael Bishop becoming the first player in AFL history to run for 100 yards in a single game. On the AFL's 20 Greatest Highlights Countdown, this is at #12.
- In 2019, Crush co-owner Pat Bowlen became the second contributor with significant impact on arena football to be inducted into the Pro Football Hall of Fame. Bowlen died a month before the ceremony.

== Coaches ==
Head coach	Tenure	Regular season record (W-L)	Postseason record (W-L)	Most recent coaching staff	Notes
Bob Beers	2003	2–14	0–0		
Mike Dailey	2004–2008	46–34	6–3	DC: Tommy Johnson (2009); OC: Chris MacKeown (2009); DL: Tony Federico (2003–2008); ST coordinator / WR coach: Matt Gardner (2004–2008)	

== Season-by-season ==
ArenaBowl champions	ArenaBowl appearance	Division champions	Playoff berth

Season	League	Conference	Division	Regular season			Postseason results
Season	League	Conference	Division	Finish	Wins	Losses	Postseason results
Colorado Crush
2003	AFL	American	Western	4th	2	14	
2004	AFL	American	Central	2nd	11	5	Won Quarterfinals (New Orleans) 47–44; Lost Semifinals (Arizona) 45–41
2005	AFL	American	Central	1st	10	6	Won Conference Semifinals (San Jose) 56–48; Won Conference Finals (Chicago) 49–43 (OT); Won ArenaBowl XIX (Georgia) 51–48
2006	AFL	American	Central	1st	11	5	Lost Divisional Round (Chicago) 63–46
2007	AFL	American	Central	3rd	8	8	Won Wild Card Round (Kansas City) 49–42; Lost Divisional Round (San Jose) 76–67
2008	AFL	American	Central	2nd	6	10	Won Wild Card Round (Utah) 49–44; Lost Divisional Round (San Jose) 64–51
2009	The AFL suspended operations for the 2009 season.						
Total					48	48	(includes only regular season)
Total					6	4	(includes only the postseason)
Total					54	52	(includes both regular season and postseason)

== Players of note ==
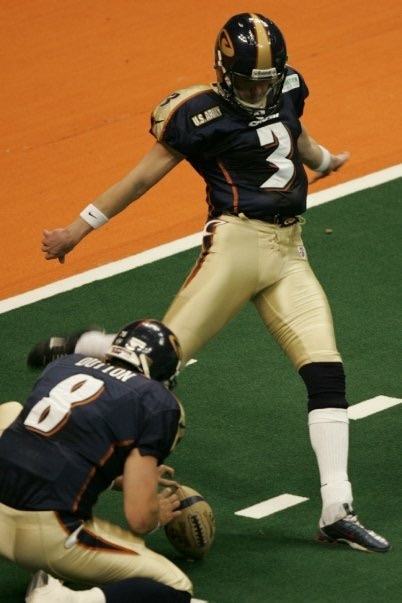
Clay Rush (#3) and John Dutton (#8)

=== Individual awards ===
Offensive Player of the Year
Season	Player	Position
2005	Damian Harrell	OS
2006	Damian Harrell	OS

=== Arena Football Hall of Famers ===
Colorado Crush Hall of Famers
No.	Name	Year Inducted	Position(s)	Years w/ Crush
--	Mike Dailey	2012	Head Coach	2004–2008

=== All-Arena players ===
The following Crush players were named to All-Arena Teams:

- FB/LB Rich Young (1)
- WR Damian Harrell (1)
- C Kyle Moore-Brown (2)
- DL Aaron McConnell (1)
- DB Rashad Floyd (1)
- OS Damian Harrell (3)
- DS Rashad Floyd (2)
- K Clay Rush (2)

=== All-Ironman players ===
The following Crush players have been named to All-Ironman Teams:

- FB/LB Rich Young (1), Robert Thomas (1)
- WR/LB Kevin McKenzie (1), Willis Marshall (1)
- WR/DB Willis Marshall (2)
- OL/DL Kyle Moore-Brown (2), Chris Snyder (1)

=== All-Rookie players ===
The following Crush players have been named to All-Rookie Teams:

- FB/LB Anthony Dunn
- WR Chad Owens
- DL John Syptak

== Trivia ==
The team's main color and name are in reference to the Denver Broncos 1970s defensive squad (the "Orange Crush").

Denver was host to one of the four charter teams, the Denver Dynamite, which won the first-ever ArenaBowl in 1987.

Van Montgomery from the TV show Reba played for the Crush at the end of his football career.
