= 2007 Philadelphia Soul season =

Arena Football League team season

- Head coach: Bret Munsey
- Home stadium: Wachovia Center & Wachovia Spectrum(alt.)

Results
- Record: 8–8
- Division place: 2nd
- Playoffs: L 65–39 vs. Georgia

The 2007 Philadelphia Soul season was the fourth season for the franchise. They look to make the playoffs again after finishing 2006 with a 9–7 record. After posting an 8–8 record in the regular season, they hosted their first-ever home playoff game on June 29 against the Orlando Predators, whom they defeated to help clinch the home game the previous week. They subsequently defeated the Predators 41–26.

== Schedule ==
Week	Date	Opponent	Home/Away	Result
1		Bye	Week	
2	March 9	Nashville Kats	Away	W 63–30
3	March 15	Grand Rapids Rampage	Away	W 69–40
4	March 22	Colorado Crush	Home	W 71–47
5	April 1	New York Dragons	Away	W 65–60
6	April 9	Georgia Force	Home	L 57–49
7	April 16	Dallas Desperados	Away	L 51–41
8	April 23	Columbus Destroyers	Away	L 44–21
9	April 30	Chicago Rush	Away	L 54–43
10	May 5	Kansas City Brigade	Home	L 53–41
11	May 14	New York Dragons	Home	L 69–49
12	May 21	New Orleans VooDoo	Home	W 78–34
13	May 27	Austin Wranglers	Away	W 76–66
14	June 1	Dallas Desperados	Home	L 59–56
15	June 9	Tampa Bay Storm	Away	L 69–59
16	June 16	Columbus Destroyers	Home	W 56–53
17	June 21	Orlando Predators	Home	W 63–49

== Playoffs ==
Round	Date	Opponent	Home/Away	Result
1	June 29	(5) Orlando Predators	Home	W 41–26
2	July 8	(2) Georgia Force	Away	L 65–39

== Coaching ==
Bret Munsey started his second season as head coach of the Soul.

== 2007 roster ==
2007 Philadelphia Soul roster
Quarterbacks: 7 Tony Graziani; 13 Leon Murray; Fullbacks: 40 Wes Ours; Wide receivers: 1 Larry Brackins; 85 Jerrian James; 5 J. J. McKelvey; 19 Charles Pauley; 88 Sean Scott	Offensive linemen: 55 Martin Bibla; 77 Phil Bogle; 70 Kelvin Chaisson; 65 Mike Mabry; Defensive linemen: 91 Felipe Claybrooks; 93 Delbert Cowsette; 95 Dwayne Missouri; 97 Gabe Nyenhuis; 98 Bryan Save	Linebackers: 24 Raheem Orr; 2 Idris Price; Defensive backs: 11 Mike Brown; 21 Kevin Gaines; 10 Brian Mance; 6 Eddie Moten; 8 Aric Williams; Kickers: 4 Todd France	Injured reserve: 45 Matt Bernstein FB; 92 Jason Davis DL; 14 Scottie Vines WR; 12 Juston Wood QB; League suspension: Currently vacant; Team suspension: Currently vacant; Other League Exempt: 75 Atlas Herrion OL; 22 Brandon Williams DB; Inactive reserve: Currently vacant; Refuse to Report: Currently vacant; Recallable reassignment: Currently vacant; Rookies in italics Roster updated October 17, 2013; 25 Active, 5 Inactive

== Stats ==
=== Offense ===
==== Quarterback ====
Player	Comp.	Att.	Comp%	Yards	TD's	INT's	Long	Rating
Tony Graziani	225	362	62.2	2841	64	8	45	117
Clint Stoerner	59	101	58.4	698	8	2	34	91.1
Juston Wood	84	143	58.7	980	20	9	40	88.3
Leon Murray	17	39	43.6	164	4	4	33	42

==== Running backs ====
Player	Car.	Yards	Avg.	TD's	Long
Wes Ours	39	129	3.3	8	14
Juston Wood	11	66	6	3	22
Idirs Price	27	57	2.1	8	14
Charles Pauley	4	44	11	1	25
George Layne	6	17	2.8	0	14
Leon Murray	2	11	5.5	0	10
Jerrian James	6	10	1.7	0	3
Tony Graziani	3	4	1.3	3	2
Mike Brown	2	2	1	1	1
Clint Stoerner	3	2	.7	0	1
Sean Scott	7	1	.1	0	4

==== Wide receivers ====
Player	Rec.	Yards	Avg.	TD's	Long
Charles Pauley	104	1473	14.2	27	45
Larry Brackins	56	786	14	20	40
Jerrian James	63	647	10.3	13	45
J.J. McKelvey	50	544	10.9	19	34
Sean Scott	47	526	11.2	8	38
Steve Gonzalez	15	128	8.5	3	22
Wes Ours	12	112	9.3	1	19
Mike Brown	8	94	11.8	1	21
Scott Vines	1	12	12	0	12
Martin Bibla	2	4	2	0	3
George Layne	1	1	1	0	1

==== Touchdowns ====
Player	TD's	Rush	Rec	Ret	Pts
Charles Pauley	29	1	27	1	174
Larry Brackins	20	0	20	0	122
J.J. McKelvey	19	0	19	0	116
Jerrian James	13	0	13	0	78
Wes Ours	9	8	1	0	56
Idris Price	8	8	0	0	50
Sean Scott	8	0	8	0	48
Mike Brown	3	1	1	1	24
Tony Graziani	3	3	0	0	20
Steve Gonzalez	3	0	3	0	18
Juston Wood	3	3	0	0	18

=== Defense ===
Player	Tackles	Solo	Assisted	Sack	Solo	Assisted	INT	Yards	TD's	Long
Eddie Moten	89	75	28	0	0	0	9	204	3	50
Mike Brown	67.5	57	21	0	0	0	6	37	0	30
Brian Mance	49.5	45	9	0	0	0	0	0	0	0
Kevin Gaines	45	36	18	0	0	0	1	12	0	12
Idris Price	39.5	30	19	2	2	0	0	0	0	0
Jerrian James	32.5	26	13	0	0	0	0	0	0	0
Bryan Save	21	9	24	4	4	0	0	0	0	0
J.J. McKelvey	19.5	15	9	0	0	0	1	6	0	6
Dwayne Missouri	18	13	10	6	6	0	0	0	0	0
Sean Scott	17.5	13	9	1	1	0	0	0	0	0
Aric Williams	16	11	10	0	0	0	0	0	0	0
Raheem Orr	15.5	13	5	0	0	0	0	0	0	0
Gabe Nyenhuis	14	9	10	3	3	0	0	0	0	0
Larry Brackins	12.5	10	5	0	0	0	0	0	0	0
Delbert Cowsette	10	4	12	1	1	0	0	0	0	0
Felipe Claybrooks	7.5	5	5	1	1	0	0	0	0	0
Steve Gonzalez	7.5	7	1	0	0	0	0	0	0	0
Todd France	7	6	2	0	0	0	0	0	0	0
Charles Pauley	2	2	0	0	0	0	0	0	0	0
Martin Bibla	1	1	0	0	0	0	0	0	0	0
Phil Bogle	1	1	0	0	0	0	0	0	0	0
Mike Mabry	1	0	2	0	0	0	0	0	0	0
Leon Murray	1	1	0	0	0	0	0	0	0	0
Wes Ours	1	1	0	0	0	0	0	0	0	0
Juston Wood	1	1	0	0	0	0	0	0	0	0
Jason Davis	0.5	0	1	0	0	0	0	0	0	0

=== Special teams ===
==== Kick return ====
Player	Ret	Yards	TD's	Long	Avg	Ret	Yards	TD's	Long	Avg
Mike Brown	44	919	1	56	20.9	2	13	0	11	6.5
Charles Pauley	37	733	1	57	19.8	1	13	0	13	13
Steve Gonzalez	9	113	0	20	12.6	0	0	0	0	0
Eddie Moten	4	49	0	19	12.3	5	60	0	22	12
Kevin Gaines	2	19	0	19	9.5	1	14	0	14	14
Sean Scott	1	4	0	4	4	0	0	0	0	0
Brian Mance	0	0	0	0	0	1	0	0	0	0
Dwayne Missouri	0	0	0	0	0	1	30	0	30	30
Idris Price	1	0	0	0	0	0	0	0	0	0

==== Kicking ====
Player	Extra pt.	Extra pt. Att.	FG	FGA	Long	Pct.	Pts
Todd France	105	120	9	16	52	0.563	132

== Playoff Stats ==
=== Offense ===
==== Quarterback ====
Player	Comp.	Att.	Comp%	Yards	TD's	INT's
Tony Graziani	20	35	57.1	198	3	0

==== Running backs ====
Player	Car.	Yards	Avg.	TD's	Long
Charles Pauley	2	15	7.5	1	11
Idris Price	4	7	1.8	0	3
Tony Graziani	2	2	1	0	2
Sean Scott	1	0	0	0	0

==== Wide receivers ====
Player	Rec.	Yards	Avg.	TD's	Long
Charles Pauley	6	60	10	1	17
Sean Scott	5	37	7.4	0	11
J.J. McKelvey	4	48	12	1	32
Jerrian James	4	44	11	1	23
Wes Ours	1	9	9	0	9

=== Special teams ===
==== Kick return ====
Player	Ret	Yards	Avg	Long
Mike Brown	5	74	14.8	15
Charles Pauley	1	17	17	17

==== Kicking ====
Player	Extra pt.	Extra pt. Att.	FG	FGA	Long	Pts
Todd France	2	2	5	5	38	11

== Regular season ==
=== Week 2: at Nashville Kats ===
at the Gaylord Entertainment Center, Nashville, Tennessee

Scoring summary:

1st Quarter:

2nd Quarter:

3rd Quarter:

4th Quarter:

=== Week 3: at Grand Rapids Rampage ===
at Van Andel Arena, Grand Rapids, Michigan

Scoring summary:

1st Quarter:

2nd Quarter:

3rd Quarter:

4th Quarter:

=== Week 4: vs Colorado Crush ===
at the Wachovia Center, Philadelphia

Scoring summary:

1st Quarter:

2nd Quarter:

3rd Quarter:

4th Quarter:

=== Week 5: at New York Dragons ===
at the Nassau Coliseum, Uniondale, New York

Scoring summary:

1st Quarter:

2nd Quarter:

3rd Quarter:

4th Quarter:

=== Week 6: vs Georgia Force ===
at the Wachovia Center, Philadelphia

Scoring summary:

1st Quarter:

2nd Quarter:

3rd Quarter:

4th Quarter:

=== Week 7: at Dallas Desperados ===
at the American Airlines Center, Dallas

Scoring summary:

1st Quarter:

2nd Quarter:

3rd Quarter:

4th Quarter:

=== Week 8: at Columbus Destroyers ===
at Nationwide Arena, Columbus, Ohio

Scoring summary:

1st Quarter:

2nd Quarter:

3rd Quarter:

4th Quarter:

=== Week 9: at Chicago Rush ===
at Allstate Arena, Rosemont, Illinois

Scoring summary:

1st Quarter:

2nd Quarter:

3rd Quarter:

4th Quarter:

=== Week 10: vs Kansas City Brigade ===
at the Wachovia Spectrum, Philadelphia

Scoring summary:

1st Quarter:

2nd Quarter:

3rd Quarter:

4th Quarter:

=== Week 11: vs New York Dragons ===
at the Wachovia Center, Philadelphia

Scoring summary:

1st Quarter:

2nd Quarter:

3rd Quarter:

4th Quarter:

=== Week 12: vs New Orleans VooDoo ===
at the Wachovia Center, Philadelphia

Scoring summary:

1st Quarter:

2nd Quarter:

3rd Quarter:

4th Quarter:

=== Week 13: at Austin Wranglers ===
at Frank Erwin Center, Austin, Texas

Scoring summary:

1st Quarter:

2nd Quarter:

3rd Quarter:

4th Quarter:

=== Week 14: vs Dallas Desperados ===
at the Wachovia Center, Philadelphia

Scoring summary:

1st Quarter:

2nd Quarter:

3rd Quarter:

4th Quarter:

=== Week 15: at Tampa Bay Storm ===
at the St. Pete Times Forum, Tampa, Florida

Scoring summary:

1st Quarter:

2nd Quarter:

3rd Quarter:

4th Quarter:

=== Week 16: vs Columbus Destroyers ===
at the Wachovia Spectrum, Philadelphia

Scoring summary:

1st Quarter:

2nd Quarter:

3rd Quarter:

4th Quarter:

=== Week 17: vs Orlando Predators ===
at the Wachovia Center, Philadelphia

Scoring summary:

1st Quarter:

2nd Quarter:

3rd Quarter:

4th Quarter:

Team	1st Down.	Rush. Yds	Pass. Yds	Fumbles/lost	Fumble yds	Penal./yds	TOP	3rd Down.	4th Down.
ORL	21	3	301	2/2	0	8/53	29:08	5/8	1/2
PHI	22	11	262	0/0	0	5/30	30:52	4/7	2/3

== Playoffs ==
=== Week 1: vs (5) Orlando Predators ===
at the Wachovia Center, Philadelphia

Scoring summary:

1st Quarter:

2nd Quarter:

3rd Quarter:

4th Quarter:

Team	1st Down.	Rush. Yds	Pass. Yds	Fumbles/lost	Fumble yds	Penal./yds	TOP	3rd Down.	4th Down.
ORL	11	−2	227	2/1	0	12/78	31:18	1/9	1/4
PHI	18	24	198	1/1	0	3/21	28:42	3/7	0/2
