= 2008 Philadelphia Soul season =

Arena Football League team season

- Head coach: Bret Munsey
- Home stadium: Wachovia Center/Wachovia Spectrum

Results
- Record: 13–3
- Division place: 1st
- Playoffs: Won Divisional Playoffs (Dragons) 49–48; Won Conference Championship (Gladiators) 70–35 Won ArenaBowl XXII (San Jose SaberCats) 59–56
- Team OPY: Chris Jackson

The 2008 Philadelphia Soul season was the fifth season for the franchise. The Soul started the season by winning their first nine games. Finishing the regular season with a 13–3 record, this was the Soul's best regular season to that point in their then-short history. They won their first Eastern Division title, and went into the playoffs as the top seed in the National Conference. Against the New York Dragons, the Soul won their Divisional round game by a score of 49–48 to advance to the National Conference Championship. They won that game on July 12, 2008, against the Cleveland Gladiators, 70–35. They won ArenaBowl XXII in New Orleans on July 27, 2008, against the defending champion San Jose SaberCats.

== Standings ==
Eastern Division
Team	W	L	PCT	PF	PA	DIV	CONF	Home	Away
Philadelphia Soul^{(1)}	13	3	.813	992	810	7–1	9–2	7–1	6–2
Dallas Desperados^{(3)}	12	4	.750	861	798	6–2	9–2	6–2	6–2
Cleveland Gladiators^{(4)}	9	7	.563	901	895	4–4	5–6	6–2	3–5
New York Dragons^{(6)}	8	8	.500	822	819	2–6	4–7	5–3	3–5
Columbus Destroyers	3	13	.188	750	893	1–7	2–10	2–6	1–7

== Regular season schedule ==
Week	Date	Opponent	Result	Record	Location	Attendance	Recap
1	March 1	Orlando Predators	W 77–56	1–0	Wachovia Center	17,869	Recap
2	March 9	at Chicago Rush	W 60–49	2–0	Allstate Arena	16,051	Recap
3	March 16	New York Dragons	W 63–42	3–0	Wachovia Center	16,102	Recap
4	March 20	at Los Angeles Avengers	W 71–34	4–0	Staples Center	13,398	Recap
5	March 29	Tampa Bay Storm	W 59–51	5–0	Wachovia Center	16,179	Recap
6	April 5	Utah Blaze	W 64–56	6–0	Wachovia Spectrum	16,390	Recap
7	April 12	at San Jose SaberCats	W 58–57	7–0	HP Pavilion	12,462	Recap
8	April 21	at Columbus Destroyers	W 76–55	8–0	Nationwide Arena	14,974	Recap
9	April 28	Dallas Desperados	W 57–28	9–0	Wachovia Spectrum	15,426	Recap
10	May 2	at Cleveland Gladiators	L 55–67	9–1	Quicken Loans Arena	13,721	Recap
11	May 12	at Georgia Force	L 62–63	9–2	The Arena at Gwinnett Center	10,278	Recap
12	May 17	Columbus Destroyers	W 51–43	10–2	Wachovia Center	18,741	Recap
13	May 22	Kansas City Brigade	L 47–54	10–3	Wachovia Center	14,473	Recap
14	Bye Week						
15	June 7	at Dallas Desperados	W 71–64	11–3	American Airlines Center	11,943	Recap
16	June 14	Cleveland Gladiators	W 62–61	12–3	Wachovia Center	16,637	Recap
17	June 22	at New York Dragons	W 59–30	13–3	Nassau Coliseum	9,718	Recap

== Playoff schedule ==
Round	Date	Opponent (seed)	Result	Location	Attendance	Recap
NC Divisional	July 5	New York Dragons (6)	W 49–48	Wachovia Center	16,102	Recap
NC Championship	July 12	Cleveland Gladiators (4)	W 70–35	Wachovia Center	13,389	Recap
ArenaBowl XXII	July 27	vs. San Jose SaberCats (A2)	W 59–56	New Orleans Arena	17,244	Recap

== Roster ==
2008 Philadelphia Soul roster
Quarterbacks: 2 Matt D'Orazio; 7 Tony Graziani; Running backs: 40 Wes Ours FB/LB; 30 Clifton Smith FB/LB; Wide receivers: 1 Larry Brackins; 11 Mike Brown WR/DB; 15 Brent Holmes; 81 Chris Jackson; 88 Sean Scott WR/LB; 18 Darius Watts WR	Offensive linemen: 55 Martin Bibla; 77 Phil Bogle; 65 Mike Mabry; Defensive linemen: 95 Kevin Carberry; 50 Justin Cleveland; 97 Gabe Nyenhuis; 98 Bryan Save	Linebackers: 23 Rod Davis LB; 24 Raheem Orr LB; 40 Wes Ours FB/LB; 88 Sean Scott WR/LB; 30 Clifton Smith FB/LB; Defensive backs: 11 Mike Brown WR/DB; 27 Willis Page III WR/DB; 22 Rob Keefe; 6 Eddie Moten; 5 Dee Webb; Special teams: 16 Connor Hughes K	Injured players: 4 Anthony Dunn LB; 12 Kenny Henderson WR; 54 Craig Kobel LB; 9 Brian Mance DB; Exempt List Practice squad

== Regular season ==
=== Week 1: vs. Orlando Predators ===
Quarter	1	2	3	4	Total
ORL	9	13	14	20	56
PHI	14	21	21	21	77

at Wachovia Center, Philadelphia, Pennsylvania

- Date: March 1
- Game time: 7:00 PM EST
- Game attendance: 17,869

Game information

1st Quarter:

- PHI- Wes Ours 7 YD pass from Tony Graziani (Connor Hughes kick) – 7–0 PHI
- ORL- John Vaughn 25 YD FG – 7–3 PHI
- PHI- Larry Brackins 30 YD pass from Tony Graziani (Connor Hughes kick) – 14–3 PHI
- ORL- T.T. Toliver 30 YD pass from Shane Stafford (John Vaughn kick failed) – 14–9 PHI

2nd Quarter:

- PHI- Chris Jackson 9 YD pass from Tony Graziani (Connor Hughes kick) – 21–9 PHI
- ORL- Chas Gessner 13 YD pass from Shane Stafford (John Vaughn kick failed) – 21–15 PHI
- PHI- Chris Jackson 29 YD pass from Tony Graziani (Connor Hughes kick) – 28–15 PHI
- ORL- Chas Gessner 7 YD pass from Shane Stafford (John Vaughn kick) – 28–22 PHI
- PHI- Kenny Henderson 23 YD pass from Tony Graziani (Connor Hughes kick) – 35–22 PHI

3rd Quarter:

- PHI- Larry Brackins 9 YD pass from Tony Graziani (Connor Hughes kick) – 42–22 PHI
- PHI- Clifton Smith 3 YD run (Connor Hughes kick) – 49–22 PHI
- ORL- Chas Gessner 14 YD pass from Shane Stafford (John Vaughn kick) – 49–29 PHI
- PHI- Mike Brown 56 YD Kickoff Return (Connor Hughes kick) 56–29 PHI
- ORL- T.T. Toliver 15 YD pass from Shane Stafford (John Vaughn kick) – 56–36 PHI

4th Quarter:

- PHI- Chris Jackson 13 YD pass from Tony Graziani (Connor Hughes kick) – 63–36 PHI
- ORL- T.T. Toliver 18 YD pass from Shane Stafford (Two-Point Conversion failed) – 63–42 PHI
- PHI- Chris Jackson 10 YD pass from Tony Graziani (Connor Hughes kick) – 70–42 PHI
- ORL- T.T. Toliver 18 YD pass from Shane Stafford (John Vaughn kick) – 70–49 PHI
- PHI- Larry Brackins 38 YD pass from Tony Graziani (Connor Hughes kick) – 77–49 PHI
- ORL- Chas Gessner 8 YD pass from Shane Stafford (John Vaughn kick) – 77–56 PHI
- Officials: Referee: Bill McCabe; Umpire: Mike Delaney; Linesman: Shawn Hochuli; Line judge: Dirk Bell; Back judge: Jimmy Buchanan
- Offensive Player of the Game: Chris Jackson (PHI)
- Defensive Player of the Game: Tom Johnson (PHI)
- Ironman Player of the Game: Mike Brown (PHI)

=== Week 2: at Chicago Rush ===
Quarter	1	2	3	4	Total
PHI	6	20	17	17	60
CHI	7	21	7	14	49

at Allstate Arena, Rosemont, Illinois

- Date: March 9
- Game time: 1:00 PM EST
- Game attendance: 16,051

Game information

1st Quarter:

- 07:40 PHI – Larry Brackins 34 yd pass from Tony Graziani (Connor Hughes kick failed) – 6–0 PHI
- 01:20 CHI – Dan Alexander 28 yd pass from Sherdrick Bonner (Dan Frantz kick) – 7–6 CHI

2nd Quarter:

- 12:30 PHI – Clifton Smith 1 yd run (Connor Hughes kick) – 13–7 PHI
- 06:08 CHI – Dan Alexander 1 yd run (Dan Frantz kick) – 14–13 CHI
- 05:11 PHI – Mike Brown 54 yd kickoff return (Connor Hughes kick) – 20–14 PHI
- 00:55 CHI – Damian Harrell 18 yd pass from Sherdrick Bonner (Dan Frantz kick) – 21–20 CHI
- 00:47 PHI – Larry Brackins 2 yd pass from Tony Graziani (Connor Hughes kick failed) – 26–21 PHI
- 00:01 CHI – Dan Alexander 5 yd pass from Sherdrick Bonner (Dan Frantz kick) – 28–26 CHI

3rd Quarter:

- 11:19 PHI – Connor Hughes 19 yd field goal – 29–28 PHI
- 08:33 CHI – Damian Harrell 7 yd pass from Sherdrick Bonner (Dan Frantz kick) – 35–29 CHI
- 05:14 PHI – Chris Jackson 3 yd pass from Tony Graziani (Connor Hughes kick) – 36–35 PHI
- 01:14 PHI – Chris Jackson 14 yd pass from Tony Graziani (Connor Hughes kick) – 43–35 PHI

4th Quarter:

- 10:12 PHI – Chris Jackson 12 yd pass from Tony Graziani (Connor Hughes kick) – 50–35 PHI
- 06:44 CHI – Damian Harrell 12 yd pass from Sherdrick Bonner (Dan Frantz kick) – 50–42 PHI
- 03:19 PHI – Tony Graziani 6 yd run (Connor Hughes kick) – 57–42 PHI
- 00:36 CHI – Dan Alexander 7 yd pass from Sherdrick Bonner (Dan Frantz kick) – 57–49 PHI
- 00:16 PHI – Connor Hughes 22 yd field goal – 60–49 PHI
- Officials: Referee: Bill Athan; Umpire: Matt Jordan; Linesman: Allen Baynes; Line judge: Rusty Baynes; Back judge: Greg Wilson
- Offensive Player of the Game: Chris Jackson (PHI)
- Defensive Player of the Game: Mike Brown (PHI)
- Ironman Player of the Game: Mike Brown (PHI)

=== Week 3: vs. New York Dragons ===
Quarter	1	2	3	4	Total
NY	14	7	7	14	42
PHI	14	14	14	21	63

at Wachovia Center, Philadelphia, Pennsylvania

- Date: March 16
- Game time: 2:00 PM EST
- Game attendance: 16,102

Game information

1st Quarter:

- 12:06 PHI – JACKSON 25 yd pass from GRAZIANI (HUGHES kick) – 7–0 PHI
- 05:40 NY – ANTHONY 2 yd pass from GARCIA (ONORATO kick) – 7–7
- 03:19 PHI – BRACKINS 23 yd pass from GRAZIANI (HUGHES kick) – 14–7 PHI
- 00:15 NY – SWAYNE 21 yd pass from GARCIA (ONORATO kick) – 14–14

2nd Quarter:

- 13:20 PHI – DELL 15 yd pass from GRAZIANI (HUGHES kick) – 21–14 PHI
- 09:33 NY – SWAYNE 17 yd pass from GARCIA (ONORATO kick) – 21–21
- 05:04 PHI – JACKSON 10 yd pass from GRAZIANI (HUGHES kick) – 28–21

3rd Quarter:

- 12:00 NY – WILLIS 5 yd pass from GARCIA (ONORATO kick) – 28–28
- 07:20 PHI – JACKSON 11 yd pass from GRAZIANI (HUGHES kick) – 35–28 PHI
- 00:47 PHI – BRACKINS 21 yd pass from GRAZIANI (HUGHES kick) – 42–28 PHI

4th Quarter:

- 13:37 NY – SWAYNE 9 yd pass from GARCIA (ONORATO kick) – 42–35 PHI
- 09:05 PHI – SMITH 1 yd run (HUGHES kick) – 49–35 PHI
- 04:58 NY – WILLIS 2 yd pass from GARCIA (ONORATO kick) – 49–42 PHI
- 00:50 PHI – D'ORAZIO 1 yd run (HUGHES kick) – 56–42 PHI
- 00:19 PHI – DAVIS 35 yd interception return (HUGHES kick) – 63–42 PHI
- Officials: Referee: Tim McCabe; Umpire: Rick Podraza; Linesman: Rod Pearson; Line judge: Dana McKenzie; Back judge: Scott Helverson
- Offensive Player of the Game: Chris Jackson (PHI)
- Defensive Player of the Game: Gabe Nyenhuis (PHI)
- Ironman Player of the Game: Mike Brown (PHI)

=== Week 4: at Los Angeles Avengers ===
Quarter	1	2	3	4	Total
PHI	13	21	14	23	71
LA	7	20	7	0	34

at Staples Center, Los Angeles, California

- Date: March 20
- Game time: 10:30 PM EST
- Game attendance: 13,398

Game information

1st Quarter:

- 12:01 PHI – JACKSON, Chris 23 yd pass from D'ORAZIO, Matt (HUGHES, Conner kick) – 7–0 PHI
- 07:05 LA – FORD, Lonnie 1 yd run (DAVIS, David kick) – 7–7
- 00:53 PHI – JACKSON, Chris 22 yd pass from D'ORAZIO, Matt (HUGHES, Conner kick failed) – 13–7 PHI

2nd Quarter:

- 13:24 LA – INGRAM, Kevin 6 yd pass from CUMBIE, Sonny (DAVIS, David kick failed) – 13–13
- 10:35 PHI – JACKSON, Chris 28 yd pass from D'ORAZIO, Matt (HUGHES, Conner kick) – 20–13 PHI
- 05:19 LA – INGRAM, Kevin 4 yd pass from CUMBIE, Sonny (DAVIS, David kick) – 20–20
- 02:34 PHI – JACKSON, Chris 5 yd pass from D'ORAZIO, Matt (HUGHES, Conner kick) – 27–20 PHI
- 00:43 LA – WARD, LaShaun 10 yd pass from CUMBIE, Sonny (DAVIS, David kick) – 27–27
- 00:03 PHI – BRACKINS, Larry 24 yd pass from D'ORAZIO, Matt (HUGHES, Conner kick) – 34–27 PHI

3rd Quarter:

- 07:21 LA – FORD, Lonnie 1 yd run (DAVIS, David kick) – 34–34
- 05:50 PHI – DELL, Clif 6 yd pass from D'ORAZIO, Matt (HUGHES, Conner kick) – 41–34 PHI
- 03:41 PHI – NYENHUIS, Gabe 0 yd fumble recovery (HUGHES, Conner kick) – 48–34 PHI

4th Quarter:

- 08:34 PHI – SAVE, Bryan safety – 50–34 PHI
- 06:31 PHI – JACKSON, Chris 15 yd pass from D'ORAZIO, Matt (HUGHES, Conner kick) – 57–34 PHI
- 02:14 PHI – JACKSON, Chris 30 yd pass from D'ORAZIO, Matt (HUGHES, Conner kick) 64–34 PHI
- 00:50 PHI – SAVE, Bryan 5 yd fumble recovery (HUGHES, Conner kick) – 71–34 PHI
- Officials: Referee: Perry Havener; Umpire: Tom Laverty; Linesman: Kavin McGrath; Line judge: David Meslow; Back judge: Keith Washington
- Offensive Player of the Game: Chris Jackson (PHI)
- Defensive Player of the Game: Gabe Nyenhuhis (PHI)
- Ironman Player of the Game: Mike Brown (PHI)

=== Week 5: vs. Tampa Bay Storm ===
Quarter	1	2	3	4	Total
TB	14	9	14	14	51
PHI	13	12	14	20	59

at Wachovia Center, Philadelphia, Pennsylvania

- Date: March 29
- Game time: 2:00 PM EST
- Game attendance: 13,546

Game information

1st Quarter:

- 14:18 PHI – BRACKINS 37 yd pass from D'ORAZIO (HUGHES kick) – 7–0 PHI
- 12:04 TB – SAMUELS 15 yd pass from DIETZ (MARLER kick) – 7–7
- 05:03 TB – HOLMES 14 yd pass from DIETZ (MARLER kick) – 14–7 TB
- 02:27 PHI – D'ORAZIO 5 yd run (HUGHES kick failed) – 14–13 TB

2nd Quarter:

- 13:38 TB – MARLER 41 yd field goal – 17–13 TB
- 08:10 PHI – HUGHES 33 yd field goal – 17–16 TB
- 02:17 TB – SAUNDERS 2 yd pass from DIETZ (MARLER kick failed) – 23–16 TB
- 00:39 PHI – JACKSON 13 yd pass from D'ORAZIO (HUGHES kick failed)- 23–22 TB
- 00:00 PHI – HUGHES 32 yd field goal – 25–23 PHI

3rd Quarter:

- 13:22 TB – EDWARDS 39 yd pass from DIETZ (MARLER kick) – 30–25 TB
- 09:52 PHI – BRACKINS 8 yd pass from D'ORAZIO (HUGHES kick) – 32–30 PHI
- 07:56 PHI – JACKSON 14 yd pass from D'ORAZIO (HUGHES kick) – 39–30 PHI
- 02:07 TB – SAMUELS 28 yd pass from DIETZ (MARLER kick) – 39–37 PHI

4th Quarter:

- 10:52 PHI – BRACKINS 9 yd pass from D'ORAZIO (HUGHES kick) – 46–37 PHI
- 07:46 TB – MARSHALL 2 yd run (MARLER kick) – 46–44 PHI
- 06:08 PHI – WATTS 14 yd pass from D'ORAZIO (HUGHES kick failed) – 52–44 PHI
- 03:12 TB – SAMUELS 22 yd pass from DIETZ (MARLER kick) – 52–51 PHI
- 00:38 PHI – JACKSON 3 yd pass from D'ORAZIO (HUGHES kick) – 59–51 PHI
- Officials: Riley Johnson; Umpire: Rick Lowe; Linesman: Julian Mapp; Line judge: RG Detillier; Back judge: Bud McCleskey
- Offensive Player of the Game: Larry Brackins (PHI)
- Defensive Player of the Game: Anthony Dunn (PHI)
- Ironman Player of the Game: Mike Brown (PHI)

=== Week 6: vs. Utah Blaze ===
Quarter	1	2	3	4	Total
UTA	14	14	14	14	56
PHI	16	20	14	14	64

at Wachovia Spectrum, Philadelphia, Pennsylvania

- Date: April 5
- Game time: 7:00 PM EST
- Game attendance: 16,390

Game information

1st Quarter:

- 12:07 UTA – WHITTAKER 15 yd pass from GERMAINE (AZAR kick) – 7–0 UTA
- 09:53 PHI – JACKSON 13 yd pass from D'ORAZIO (HUGHES kick) – 7–7
- 06:44 UTA – MCKELVEY 8 yd pass from GERMAINE (AZAR kick) – 14–7 UTA
- 03:55 PHI – D'ORAZIO 6 yd run (HUGHES kick) – 14–14
- 02:09 PHI – SAVE safety – 16–14 PHI

2nd Quarter:

- 11:23 PHI – JACKSON 9 yd pass from D'ORAZIO (HUGHES kick) – 23–14 PHI
- 10:02 PHI – JACKSON 7 yd pass from D'ORAZIO (HUGHES kick) – 30–14 PHI
- 08:24 UTA – BOONE 20 yd pass from GERMAINE (AZAR kick) – 30–21 PHI
- 04:55 PHI – JACKSON 7 yd pass from D'ORAZIO (HUGHES kick failed) – 36–21 PHI
- 00:22 UTA – FILER 2 yd run (AZAR kick) – 36–28 PHI

3rd Quarter:

- 11:04 UTA – WHITTAKER 8 yd pass from GERMAINE (AZAR kick) – 36–35 PHI
- 07:42 PHI – BIBLA 14 yd pass from D'ORAZIO (HUGHES kick) – 43–35 PHI
- 06:48 PHI – BROWN 4 yd fumble recovery (HUGHES kick) – 50–35 PHI
- 01:32 UTA – FILER 1 yd run (AZAR kick) – 50–42 PHI

4th Quarter:

- 11:59 PHI – SMITH 3 yd run (HUGHES kick) – 57–42 PHI
- 08:51 UTA – WHITTAKER 6 yd pass from GERMAINE (AZAR kick) – 57–49 PHI
- 06:39 PHI – JACKSON 19 yd pass from D'ORAZIO (HUGHES kick) – 64–49 PHI
- 02:36 UTA – FILER 1 yd run (AZAR kick) – 64–56 PHI
- Officials: Referee: Dennis Lipski; Umpire: Rick Nelson; Linesman: Brent Durbin; Line judge: Darrel Leftwich; Back judge: Reggie Smith
- Offensive Player of the Game: Chris Jackson (PHI)
- Defensive Player of the Game: Bryan Save (PHI)
- Ironman Player of the Game: Mike Brown (PHI)

=== Week 7: at San Jose SaberCats ===
Quarter	1	2	3	4	Total
PHI	0	14	14	30	58
SJ	20	13	7	17	57

at HP Pavilion at San Jose, San Jose, California

- Date: April 12
- Game time: 10:30 PM EST
- Game attendance: 12,462

Game information

1st Quarter:

- 11:35 SJ – WRIGHT, Rodney 10 yd pass from GRIEB, Mark (HAGLUND, A.J. kick failed) – 6–0 SJ
- 04:02 SJ – CARTER, Frank 1 yd run (HAGLUND, A.J. kick) – 13–0 SJ
- 00:20 SJ – ROE, James 7 yd pass from GRIEB, Mark (HAGLUND, A.J. kick) – 20–0 SJ

2nd Quarter:

- 10:49 PHI – WATTS, Darius 20 yd pass from D'ORAZIO, Matt (HUGHES, Connor kick) – 20–7 SJ
- 07:47 SJ – CARTER, Frank 1 yd run (HAGLUND, A.J. pass failed) – 26–7 SJ
- 00:49 SJ – SAINTIL, Cleann 22 yd pass from GRIEB, Mark (HAGLUND, A.J. kick) – 33–7 SJ
- 00:10 PHI – SMITH, Clifton 1 yd run (HUGHES, Connor kick) – 33–14 SJ

3rd Quarter:

- 14:28 PHI – BRACKINS, Larry 17 yd pass from D'ORAZIO, Matt (HUGHES, Connor kick) – 33–21 SJ
- 12:17 SJ – ROE, James 5 yd pass from GRIEB, Mark (HAGLUND, A.J. kick) – 40–21 SJ
- 04:49 PHI – BRACKINS, Larry 4 yd pass from D'ORAZIO, Matt (HUGHES, Connor kick) – 40–28 SJ

4th Quarter:

- 13:05 PHI – JACKSON, Chris 13 yd pass from D'ORAZIO, Matt (HUGHES, Connor kick) – 40–35 SJ
- 07:44 SJ – ROE, James 11 yd pass from GRIEB, Mark (HAGLUND, A.J. kick) – 47–35 SJ
- 06:46 PHI – BROWN, Mike 57 yd kickoff return (HUGHES, Connor kick) – 47–42 PHI
- 01:45 SJ – HAGLUND, A.J. 34 yd field goal – 50–42 SJ
- 01:00 PHI – JACKSON, Chris 41 yd pass from D'ORAZIO, Matt (BRACKINS, Larry pass from D'ORAZIO, Matt) – 50–50
- 00:49 SJ – WRIGHT, Rodney 30 yd pass from GRIEB, Mark (HAGLUND, A.J. kick) – 57–50 SJ
- 00:10 PHI – D'ORAZIO, Matt 5 yd run (SMITH, Clifton rush) – 58–57 PHI
- Officials: Referee: Bill Athan; Umpire: Paul King; Linesman: Bill Ward; Line judge: Bob McElwee; Back judge: James DeBell
- Offensive Player of the Game: Chris Jackson (PHI)
- Defensive Player of the Game: Marquis Floyd (SJ)
- Ironman Player of the Game: Mike Brown (PHI)

=== Week 8: at Columbus Destroyers ===
Quarter	1	2	3	4	Total
PHI	21	21	20	14	76
CLB	21	14	7	13	55

at Nationwide Arena, Columbus, Ohio

- Date: April 21
- Game time: 8:00 PM EST
- Game attendance: 14,974

Game information

1st Quarter:

- 14:22 CLB – RUSSELL, Calvin 42 yd pass from NAGY, Matt (LEWIS, Mark kick) – 7–0 CLB
- 13:10 PHI – BRACKINS, Larry 39 yd pass from GRAZIANI, Tony (HUGHES, Connor kick) – 7–7
- 11:54 CLB – LEE, Derek 45 yd pass from NAGY, Matt (LEWIS, Mark kick) – 14–7 CLB
- 09:27 PHI – BRACKINS, Larry 12 yd pass from GRAZIANI, Tony (HUGHES, Connor kick) – 14–14
- 08:25 CLB – JOHNSON, C.J. 45 yd pass from NAGY, Matt (LEWIS, Mark kick) – 21–14 CLB
- 04:41 PHI – BOGLE, Phil 8 yd pass from GRAZIANI, Tony (HUGHES, Connor kick) – 21–21

2nd Quarter:

- 12:33 PHI – JACKSON, Chris 4 yd pass from GRAZIANI, Tony (HUGHES, Connor kick) – 28–21 PHI
- 09:20 CLB – WELLS, Harold 5 yd run (LEWIS, Mark kick) – 28–28
- 06:14 PHI – JACKSON, Chris 12 yd pass from D'ORAZIO, Matt (HUGHES, Connor kick) – 35–28 PHI
- 01:26 CLB – JOHNSON, C.J. 20 yd pass from NAGY, Matt (LEWIS, Mark kick) – 35–35
- 00:00 PHI – JACKSON, Chris 4 yd pass from D'ORAZIO, Matt (HUGHES, Connor kick) – 42–35 PHI

3rd Quarter:

- 11:27 PHI – D'ORAZIO, Matt 4 yd run (HUGHES, Connor kick blocked) – 48–35 PHI
- 07:55 PHI – WATTS, Darius 11 yd pass from D'ORAZIO, Matt (HUGHES, Connor kick) – 55–35 PHI
- 04:37 CLB – LEE, Derek 9 yd pass from NAGY, Matt (LEWIS, Mark kick) – 55–42 PHI
- 01:48 PHI – BRACKINS, Larry 24 yd pass from D'ORAZIO, Matt (HUGHES, Connor kick) – 62–42 PHI

4th Quarter:

- 09:17 PHI – BOGLE, Phil 4 yd pass from D'ORAZIO, Matt (HUGHES, Connor kick) – 69–42 PHI
- 06:09 CLB – RUSSELL, Calvin 27 yd pass from NAGY, Matt (WELLS, Harold pass failed) – 69–48 PHI
- 05:03 PHI – OURS, Wes 8 yd run (HUGHES, Connor kick) – 76–48 PHI
- 01:05 CLB – THOMPSON, Leroy 1 yd pass from NAGY, Matt (LEWIS, Mark kick) – 76–55 PHI
- Officials: Referee: Dave Cutaia; Umpire: Al Granado; Linesman: Mike McCabe; Line judge: Art Lucky; Back judge: James Cole
- Offensive Player of the Game: Larry Brackins (PHI)
- Defensive Player of the Game: Anthony Dunn (PHI)
- Ironman Player of the Game: N/A

=== Week 9: vs. Dallas Desperados ===
Quarter	1	2	3	4	Total
DAL	0	13	7	8	28
PHI	14	23	6	14	57

at Wachovia Center, Philadelphia, Pennsylvania

- Date: April 28
- Game time: 8:00 PM EST
- Game attendance: 15,426

Game information

1st Quarter:

- 12:02 PHI – D'ORAZIO 7 yd run (HUGHES kick) – 7–0 PHI
- 02:12 PHI – BRACKINS 17 yd pass from D'ORAZIO (HUGHES kick) – 14–0 PHI

2nd Quarter:

- 08:40 PHI – WATTS 4 yd pass from D'ORAZIO (HUGHES kick) – 21–0 PHI
- 04:51 DAL – DOLEZEL 1 yd run (HAMILTON kick blocked) – 21–6 PHI
- 04:51 PHI – BROWN PAT return – 23–6 PHI
- 00:53 PHI – BOGEL 3 yd pass from D'ORAZIO (HUGHES kick) – 30–6 PHI
- 00:33 DAL – DOLEZEL 2 yd run (HAMILTON kick) – 30–13 PHI
- 00:04 PHI – BRACKINS 17 yd pass from D'ORAZIO (HUGHES kick) – 37–13 PHI

3rd Quarter:

- 13:37 DAL – PETTIS 22 yd pass from DOLEZEL (HAMILTON kick) – 37–20 PHI
- 09:51 PHI – JACKSON 17 yd pass from D'ORAZIO (HUGHES kick failed) – 43–20 PHI

4th Quarter:

- 14:56 PHI – D'ORAZIO 1 yd run (HUGHES kick) – 50–20 PHI
- 11:47 DAL – PETTIS 25 yd pass from DOLEZEL (NASH pass from DOLEZEL) – 50–28 PHI
- 09:20 PHI – BRACKINS 12 yd pass from D'ORAZIO (HUGHES kick) – 57–28 PHI
- Officials: Referee: Perry Havener; Umpire: Tom Laverly; Linesman: Kavin McGrath; Line judge: David Meslow; Back judge: Keith Washington; Field judge: Jerry Trice
- Offensive Player of the Game: Matt D'Orazio (PHI)
- Defensive Player of the Game: Eddie Moten (PHI)
- Ironman Player of the Game: Mike Brown (PHI)

=== Week 10: at Cleveland Gladiators ===
Quarter	1	2	3	4	Total
PHI	20	14	14	7	55
CLE	14	13	20	20	67

at Quicken Loans Arena, Cleveland, Ohio

- Date: May 2
- Game time: 7:00 PM EST
- Game attendance: 13,721

Game information

1st Quarter:

- 12:24 PHI – BRACKINS 18 yd pass from D'ORAZIO (HUGHES kick failed) – 6–0 PHI
- 10:53 PHI – WEBB 0 yd net recovery (HUGHES kick) – 13–0 PHI
- 08:07 CLE – JACKSON 2 yd run (BALL kick) – 13–7 PHI
- 04:21 PHI – BRACKINS 6 yd pass from D'ORAZIO (HUGHES kick) – 20–7 PHI
- 02:01 CLE – AMEY 12 yd pass from PHILYAW (BALL kick) – 20–14 PHI

2nd Quarter:

- 12:49 PHI – JACKSON 3 yd pass from D'ORAZIO (HUGHES kick) – 27–14 PHI
- 08:22 CLE – AMEY 21 yd pass from PHILYAW (BALL kick failed) – 27–20 PHI
- 00:36 PHI – D'ORAZIO 4 yd run (HUGHES kick) – 34–20 PHI
- 00:17 CLE – AMEY 16 yd pass from PHILYAW (BALL kick) – 34–27 PHI

3rd Quarter:

- 13:56 CLE – JACKSON 5 yd run (BALL kick) – 34–34
- 12:29 CLE – REDD 0 yd net recovery (BALL kick) – 41–34 CLE
- 09:47 PHI – WATTS 20 yd pass from GRAZIANI (HUGHES kick) – 41–41
- 05:06 CLE – JACKSON 3 yd run (BALL kick blocked) – 47–41 CLE
- 00:09 PHI – JACKSON 8 yd pass from GRAZIANI (HUGHES kick) – 48–47 PHI

4th Quarter:

- 11:24 CLE – JACKSON 4 yd run (AMEY rush) – 55–48 CLE
- 06:57 PHI – JACKSON 7 yd pass from GRAZIANI (HUGHES kick) – 55–55
- 04:04 CLE – MINUCCI 5 yd pass from PHILYAW – 61–55 CLE
- 00:42 CLE – AMEY 23 yd pass from PHILYAW (PHILYAW pass failed) – 67–55 CLE
- Officials: Referee: Bill McCabe; Umpire: Mike Delaney; Linesman: Shawn Hochuli; Line judge: Dirk Bell; Back judge: Jimmy Buchanan
- Offensive Player of the Game: Marlion Jackson (CLE)
- Defensive Player of the Game: Sakeen Wright (CLE)
- Ironman Player of the Game: Willis Marshall (CLE)

=== Week 11: vs. Georgia Force ===
Quarter	1	2	3	4	Total
PHI	14	21	21	6	62
GA	7	27	7	22	63

at The Arena at Gwinnett Center, Duluth, Georgia

- Date: May 12
- Game time: 8:00 PM EST
- Game attendance: 10,278

Game information

1st Quarter:

- 10:36 GA – HUEBNER, Matt 1 yd run (MARTINEZ, Carlo kick) – 7–0 GA
- 07:41 PHI – SMITH, Clifton 1 yd run (HUGHES, Connor kick) – 7–7
- 06:13 PHI – SCOTT, Sean 0 yd net recovery (HUGHES, Connor kick) – 14–7 PHI

2nd Quarter:

- 14:56 GA – GROCE, Damien 3 yd run (MARTINEZ, Carlo kick) – 14–14
- 13:06 PHI – BOGLE, Phil 13 yd pass from D'ORAZIO, Matt (HUGHES, Connor kick) – 21–14 PHI
- 10:28 GA – BERGERON, Troy 22 yd pass from GREISEN, Chris (MARTINEZ, Carlo kick) – 21–21
- 06:08 GA – JONES, Tiger 45 yd pass from GREISEN, Chris (MARTINEZ, Carlo kick) – 28–21 GA
- 02:41 PHI – HENDERSON, Ken 13 yd pass from D'ORAZIO, Matt (HUGHES, Connor kick) – 28–28
- 01:14 GA – HUEBNER, Matt 6 yd pass from GREISEN, Chris (MARTINEZ, Carlo kick failed) – 34–28 GA
- 00:03 PHI – SMITH, Clifton 1 yd run (HUGHES, Connor kick) – 35–34 PHI

3rd Quarter:

- 12:17 PHI – HENDERSON, Ken 3 yd pass from D'ORAZIO, Matt (HUGHES, Connor kick) – 42–34 PHI
- 05:23 PHI – BRACKINS, Larry 8 yd pass from D'ORAZIO, Matt (HUGHES, Connor kick) – 49–34 PHI
- 01:49 GA – HUEBNER, Matt 1 yd run (MARTINEZ, Carlo kick) – 49–41 PHI
- 00:05 PHI – BRACKINS, Larry 22 yd pass from D'ORAZIO, Matt (HUGHES, Connor kick) – 56–41 PHI

4th Quarter:

- 07:25 PHI – SMITH, Clifton 7 yd run (HUGHES, Connor kick failed) – 62–41 PHI
- 02:43 GA – GREISEN, Chris 1 yd run (MARTINEZ, Carlo kick) – 62–48 PHI
- 00:42 GA – BERGERON, Troy 7 yd pass from GREISEN, Chris (MARTINEZ, Carlo kick) – 62–55 PHI
- 00:16 GA – BERGERON, Troy 11 yd pass from GREISEN, Chris (BERGERON, Troy pass from GREISEN, Chris) – 63–62 GA
- Officials: Referee: Dave Lambros; Umpire: Doug Wilson; Linesman: Kelly Saalfeld; Line judge: Brian Matthew; Back judge: Rich Wilborn
- Offensive Player of the Game: Troy Bergeron (GA)
- Defensive Player of the Game: Clifton Smith (PHI)
- Ironman Player of the Game: Matt Huebner (GA)

=== Week 12: vs. Columbus Destroyers ===
Quarter	1	2	3	4	Total
CLB	6	15	7	15	43
PHI	7	14	23	7	51

at Wachovia Spectrum, Philadelphia, Pennsylvania

- Date: May 17
- Game time: 7:00 PM EST
- Game attendance: 18,741

Game information

1st Quarter:

- 08:47 PHI – Chris Jackson 4 yd pass from Matt D'Orazio (Connor Hughes kick) – 7–0 PHI
- 00:35 CLB – Harold Wells 1 yd run (Justin Zwick rush failed) – 7–6 PHI

2nd Quarter:

- 06:25 CLB – C.J. Johnson 20 yd pass from Matt Nagy (Mark Lewis kick) – 13–7 CLB
- 05:07 PHI – Chris Jackson 33 yd pass from Matt D'Orazio (Connor Hughes kick) – 14–13 PHI
- 00:33 CLB – Matt Nagy 1 yd run (Harold Wells rush) – 21–14 CLB
- 00:19 PHI – Larry Brackins 43 yd pass from Matt D'Orazio (Connor Hughes kick) – 21–21

3rd Quarter:

- 14:21 PHI – HOLMES 18 yd pass from Matt D'Orazio (Connor Hughes kick) – 28–21 PHI
- 08:23 CLB – Rasheed Marshall 6 yd run (Mark Lewis kick) – 28–28
- 05:21 PHI – Larry Brackins 7 yd pass from Matt D'Orazio (Connor Hughes kick) – 35–28 PHI
- 03:42 PHI – Gabe Nyenhuis safety – 37–28 PHI
- 01:49 PHI – Chris Jackson 26 yd pass from Matt D'Orazio (Connor Hughes kick) – 44–28 PHI

4th Quarter:

- 12:10 CLB – Derek Lee 11 yd pass from Matt Nagy (Mark Lewis kick) – 44–35 PHI
- 09:10 PHI – Phil Bogle 21 yd pass from Matt D'Orazio (Connor Hughes kick) – 51–35 PHI
- 05:23 CLB – C.J. Johnson 12 yd pass from Matt Nagy (Calvin Russell pass from NAGY) – 51–43 PHI
- Officials: Referee: Bill LeMonnier; Umpire: Paul Frerking; Linesman: Greg Shields; Line judge: Dave Chesney; Back judge: Billy Beckett
- Offensive Player of the Game: Larry Brackins (PHI)
- Defensive Player of the Game: Gabe Nyenhuis (PHI)
- Ironman Player of the Game: Rob Keefe (PHI)

=== Week 13: vs. Kansas City Brigade ===
Quarter	1	2	3	4	Total
KC	20	13	7	14	54
PHI	14	6	14	13	47

at Wachovia Center, Philadelphia, Pennsylvania

- Date: May 22
- Game time: 7:30 PM EST
- Game attendance: 14,473

Game information

1st Quarter:

- 11:38 KC – WARD 0 yd fumble recovery (MARTINEZ kick) – 7–0 KC
- 10:12 KC – SMALLS 0 yd fumble recovery (MARTINEZ kick) – 14–0 KC
- 08:25 PHI – JACKSON 26 yd pass from D'ORAZIO (HUGHES kick) – 14–7 KC
- 03:56 KC – FREDERICK 29 yd pass from BRYANT (MARTINEZ kick failed) – 20–7 KC
- 00:56 PHI – HOLMES 27 yd pass from D'ORAZIO (HUGHES kick) – 20–14 KC

2nd Quarter:

- 10:46 KC – MANNING 8 yd pass from BRYANT (MARTINEZ kick) – 27–14 KC
- 07:32 PHI – BOGLE 3 yd pass from D'ORAZIO (HUGHES kick failed) – 27–20 KC
- 03:36 KC – FREDERICK 4 yd run (MARTINEZ kick failed) – 33–20 KC

3rd Quarter:

- 11:14 PHI – HOLMES 1 yd pass from D'ORAZIO (HUGHES kick) – 33–27 KC
- 06:04 PHI – JACKSON 12 yd pass from D'ORAZIO (HUGHES kick) – 34–33 PHI
- 00:54 KC – MOSS 2 yd run (MARTINEZ kick) – 40–33 KC

4th Quarter:

- 10:59 PHI – SMITH 1 yd run (HUGHES kick) – 41–40 PHI
- 08:35 KC – FREDERICK 15 yd pass from BRYANT (MARTINEZ kick blocked) – 46–41 KC
- 04:12 PHI – JACKSON 8 yd pass from D'ORAZIO (D'ORAZIO pass failed) – 47–46 PHI
- 01:21 KC – MYERS 8 yd pass from BRYANT (WARD pass from BRYANT) – 54–47 KC
- Officials: Referee: Pat Garvey; Umpire: Paul King; Linesman: Bill Ward; Line judge: Bob McElwee; Back judge: James Debell
- Offensive Player of the Game: Chris Jackson (PHI)
- Defensive Player of the Game: Clifton Smith (PHI)
- Ironman Player of the Game: Rob Keefe (PHI)

=== Week 15: at Dallas Desperados ===
Quarter	1	2	3	4	Total
PHI	14	28	14	15	71
DAL	21	15	14	14	64

at American Airlines Center, Dallas, Texas

- Date: June 7
- Game time: 8:00 PM EST
- Game attendance: 11,943

Game information

1st Quarter:

- 14:03 PHI – JACKSON, Chris 33 yd pass from GRAZIANI, Tony (HUGHES, Connor kick) – 7–0 PHI
- 10:18 DAL – PETTIS, Will 14 yd pass from DOLEZEL, Clint (HAMILTON, Remy kick) – 7–7
- 08:35 DAL – PERRY, Bobby 19 yd interception return (HAMILTON, Remy kick) – 14–7 DAL
- 06:28 PHI – JACKSON, Chris 31 yd pass from GRAZIANI, Tony (HUGHES, Connor kick) – 14–14
- 02:57 DAL – ARMSTRONG, Anth 28 yd pass from DOLEZEL, Clint (HAMILTON, Remy kick) – 21–14 DAL

2nd Quarter:

- 14:57 PHI – JACKSON, Chris 2 yd pass from GRAZIANI, Tony (HUGHES, Connor kick) – 21–21
- 09:10 DAL – WHITE, Josh 1 yd run (HAMILTON, Remy kick failed) – 27–21 DAL
- 04:53 PHI – JACKSON, Chris 10 yd pass from D'ORAZIO, Matt (HUGHES, Connor kick) – 28–27 PHI
- 04:01 DAL – BUSH, Josh 56 yd kickoff return (HAMILTON, Remy kick failed) – 33–28 DAL
- 02:44 PHI – D'ORAZIO, Matt 6 yd run (HUGHES, Connor kick) – 35–33 PHI
- 00:13 PHI – HOLMES, Brent 9 yd pass from D'ORAZIO, Matt (HUGHES, Connor kick) – 42–33 PHI
- 00:00 DAL – HAMILTON, Remy 36 yd field goal – 42–36 PHI

3rd Quarter:

- 11:23 DAL – WHITE, Josh 2 yd run (HAMILTON, Remy kick) – 43–42 DAL
- 09:01 PHI – JACKSON, Chris 4 yd pass from D'ORAZIO, Matt (HUGHES, Connor kick) – 49–43 PHI
- 06:36 DAL – ARMSTRONG, Anth 21 yd pass from DOLEZEL, Clint (HAMILTON, Remy kick) – 50–49 DAL
- 00:27 PHI – BRACKINS, Larry 6 yd pass from D'ORAZIO, Matt (HUGHES, Connor kick) – 56–50 PHI

4th Quarter:

- 11:02 DAL – WHITE, Josh 2 yd run (HAMILTON, Remy kick) – 57–56 DAL
- 05:25 PHI – SMITH, Clifton 1 yd run (HUGHES, Connor kick) – 63–57 PHI
- 02:48 DAL – ARMSTRONG, Anth 24 yd pass from DOLEZEL, Clint (HAMILTON, Remy kick) – 64–63 DAL
- 00:55 PHI – JACKSON, Chris 9 yd pass from D'ORAZIO, Matt (D'ORAZIO, Matt rush) – 71–64 PHI
- Officials: Referee: Riley Johnson; Umpire: Wes Fritz; Linesman: Neil Brunner; Line judge: Paul Engelberts; Back judge: Tony Lombardo
- Offensive Player of the Game: Chris Jackson (PHI)
- Defensive Player of the Game: Bobby Perry (DAL)
- Ironman Player of the Game: Josh White (DAL)

=== Week 16: vs. Cleveland Gladiators ===
Quarter	1	2	3	4	Total
CLE	14	21	13	13	61
PHI	20	21	7	14	62

at Wachovia Spectrum, Philadelphia, Pennsylvania

- Date: June 14
- Game time: 7:00 PM EST
- Game attendance: 16,637

Game information

1st Quarter:

- 14:31 PHI – HOLMES, Brent 38 yd pass from D'ORAZIO, Matt (HUGHES, Connor kick) – 7–0 PHI
- 11:36 PHI – HOLMES, Brent 14 yd pass from D'ORAZIO, Matt (HUGHES, Connor kick) – 14–0 PHI
- 08:36 CLE – JACKSON, Marlion 14 yd run (Jason Ball kick) – 14–7 PHI
- 04:22 PHI – JACKSON, Chris 24 yd pass from D'ORAZIO, Matt (HUGHES, Connor kick failed) – 20–7 PHI
- 02:12 CLE – REDD, Robert 22 yd pass from PHILYAW, Raymond (BALL, Jason kick) – 20–14 PHI

2nd Quarter:

- 12:03 PHI – D'ORAZIO, Matt 5 yd run (HUGHES, Connor kick) – 27–14 PHI
- 10:23 CLE – RUE, Joshua 2 yd run (BALL, Jason kick) – 27–21 PHI
- 04:47 PHI – JACKSON, Chris 5 yd pass from D'ORAZIO, Matt (HUGHES, Connor kick) – 34–21 PHI
- 02:28 CLE – AMEY, Otis 17 yd pass from PHILYAW, Raymond (BALL, Jason kick) – 34–28 PHI
- 00:39 PHI – OURS, Wes 2 yd run (HUGHES, Connor kick) – 41–28 PHI
- 00:11 CLE – AMEY, Otis 9 yd pass from PHILYAW, Raymond (BALL, Jason kick) – 41–35 PHI

3rd Quarter:

- 11:01 CLE – AMEY, Otis 8 yd pass from PHILYAW, Raymond (BALL, Jason kick failed) – 41–41
- 08:12 CLE – MARSHALL, Willis 1 yd run (BALL, Jason kick) – 48–41 CLE
- 02:48 PHI – SCOTT, Sean 7 yd pass from D'ORAZIO, Matt (HUGHES, Connor kick) – 48–48

4th Quarter:

- 03:15 PHI – D'ORAZIO, Matt 1 yd run (HUGHES, Connor kick) – 55–48 PHI
- 01:06 CLE – JACKSON, Marlion 22 yd pass from PHILYAW, Raymond (BALL, Jason kick) – 55–55
- 00:37 PHI – JACKSON, Chris 15 yd pass from D'ORAZIO, Matt (HUGHES, Connor kick) – 62–55 PHI
- 00:05 CLE – AMEY, Otis 9 yd pass from PHILYAW, Raymond (PHILYAW, Raymond pass intcpt) – 62–61 PHI
- Officials: Referee: Dave Cutaia; Umpire: Al Granado; Linesman: Mike McCabe; Line judge: Paul Lucky; Back judge: James Cole
- Offensive Player of the Game: Matt D'Orazio (PHI)
- Defensive Player of the Game: Bryan Save (PHI)
- Ironman Player of the Game: Rob Keefe (PHI)

=== Week 17: at New York Dragons ===
Quarter	1	2	3	4	Total
PHI	14	28	10	7	59
NY	7	3	7	13	30

at Nassau Veterans Memorial Coliseum, Uniondale, New York

- Date: June 22
- Game time: 3:00 PM EST
- Game attendance: 9,718

Game information

1st Quarter:

- 10:22 PHI – Wes Ours 1 yd run (Connor Hughes kick) – 7–0 PHI
- 05:17 PHI – Wes Ours 16 yd pass from Chris Jackson (Connor Hughes kick) – 14–0 PHI
- 03:35 NY – Jason Willis 11 yd pass from Aaron Garcia (Steve Azar kick) – 14–7 PHI

2nd Quarter:

- 13:13 PHI – Larry Brackins 3 yd pass from Matt D'Orazio (Connor Hughes kick) – 21–7 PHI
- 09:50 NY – Steve Azar 27 yd field goal – 21–10 PHI
- 06:26 PHI – Larry Brackins 10 yd pass from Matt D'Orazio (Connor Hughes kick) – 28–10 PHI
- 00:55 PHI – Chris Jackson 15 yd pass from Matt D'Orazio (Connor Hughes kick) – 35–10 PHI
- 00:22 PHI – Rod Davis 32 yd interception return (Connor Hughes kick) – 42–10 PHI

3rd Quarter:

- 10:27 NY – Juston Wood 4 yd run (Steve Azar kick) – 42–17 PHI
- 05:07 PHI – Connor Hughes 34 yd field goal – 45–17 PHI
- 01:54 PHI – Eddie Moten 52 yd interception return (Connor Hughes kick) – 52–17 PHI

4th Quarter:

- 11:19 NY – Idris Price 1 yd run (Steve Azar kick failed) – 52–23 PHI
- 06:38 PHI – Larry Brackins 17 yd pass from Glen Gauntt (Connor Hughes kick) – 59–23 PHI
- 00:53 NY – John Walker 9 yd interception return (Steve Azar kick) – 59–30 PHI
- Officials: Referee: Bill LeMonnier; Umpire: Jeff Carr; Linesman: Greg Shields; Line judge: Dave Chesney; Back judge: Billy Beckett
- Offensive Player of the Game: N/A
- Defensive Player of the Game: N/A
- Ironman Player of the Game: N/A

== Playoffs ==
=== National Conference Divisional: vs. (6) New York Dragons ===
Quarter	1	2	3	4	Total
(6) NY	6	19	0	23	48
(1) PHI	16	7	7	19	49

at Wachovia Center, Philadelphia, Pennsylvania

- Date: July 5
- Game time: 7:00 PM EST
- Game attendance: 16,102

Game information

1st Quarter:

- 13:13 PHI – Chris Jackson 37 yd pass from Matt D'Orazio (Connor Hughes kick) – 7–0 PHI
- 06:49 NY – Kevin Swayne 6 yd pass from Aaron Garcia (AZAR kick failed) – 7–6 PHI
- 03:34 PHI – HOLMES 14 yd pass from Matt D'Orazio (Connor Hughes kick) – 14–6 PHI
- 01:41 PHI – Gabe Nyenhuis safety – 16–6 PHI

2nd Quarter:

- 14:53 NY – Kevin Swayne 27 yd pass from Aaron Garcia (AZAR kick) – 16–13 PHI
- 03:10 NY – Henry Taylor safety – 16–15 PHI
- 01:37 NY – Kevin Swayne 14 yd pass from Aaron Garcia (AZAR kick) – 22–16 NY
- 00:12 PHI – Chris Jackson 7 yd pass from Matt D'Orazio (Connor Hughes kick) – 23–22 PHI
- 00:00 NY – AZAR 44 yd field goal – 25–23 NY

3rd Quarter:

- 07:09 PHI – Clifton Smith 1 yd run (Connor Hughes kick) – 30–25 PHI

4th Quarter:

- 14:55 NY – AZAR 26 yd field goal – 30–28 PHI
- 13:03 PHI – Chris Jackson 3 yd pass from Matt D'Orazio (Connor Hughes kick) – 37–28 PHI
- 10:10 NY – Kevin Swayne 25 yd pass from Aaron Garcia (AZAR kick) – 37–35 PHI
- 09:03 PHI – Chris Jackson 11 yd pass from Matt D'Orazio (Connor Hughes kick failed) – 43–35 PHI
- 05:30 NY – Kevin Swayne 5 yd pass from Aaron Garcia (Aaron Garcia pass intcpt) – 43–41 PHI
- 00:57 NY – Keron Henry 2 yd run (AZAR kick) – 48–43 NY
- 00:00 PHI – Larry Brackins 28 yd pass from Matt D'Orazio – 49–48 PHI
- Officials: Referee: Bill Athan; Umpire: Matt Jordan; Linesman: Bill Ward; Line judge: R.J. Detillier; Back judge: James Cole
- Offensive Player of the Game: Gabe Nyenhuis (PHI)
- Defensive Player of the Game: Clifton Smith (PHI)
- Ironman Player of the Game: Chris Jackson (PHI)

=== National Conference Championship: vs. (4) Cleveland Gladiators ===
Quarter	1	2	3	4	Total
(4) CLE	7	14	14	0	35
(1) PHI	14	21	21	14	70

at Wachovia Center, Philadelphia, Pennsylvania

- Date: July 12
- Game time: 1:00 PM EST
- Game attendance: 13,389

Game information

1st Quarter:

- 10:19 PHI – Larry Brackins 13 yd pass from Matt D'Orazio (Connor Hughes kick) – 7–0 PHI
- 06:28 CLE – Otis Amey 17 yd pass from Raymond Philyaw (Jason Ball kick) – 7–7
- 00:41 PHI – HOLMES 7 yd pass from Matt D'Orazio (Connor Hughes kick) – 14–7 PHI

2nd Quarter:

- 12:35 PHI – Chris Jackson 5 yd pass from Matt D'Orazio (Connor Hughes kick) – 21–7 PHI
- 08:07 PHI – Wes Ours 2 yd run (Connor Hughes kick) – 28–7 PHI
- 05:30 CLE – Otis Amey 8 yd pass from Raymond Philyaw (Jason Ball kick) – 28–14 PHI
- 04:36 PHI – Chris Jackson 9 yd pass from Matt D'Orazio (Connor Hughes kick) – 35–14 PHI
- 02:04 CLE – Marlion Jackson 4 yd run (Jason Ball kick) – 35–21 PHI

3rd Quarter:

- 12:52 PHI – Larry Brackins 17 yd pass from Matt D'Orazio (Connor Hughes kick) – 42–21 PHI
- 10:14 CLE – Robert Redd 16 yd pass from Raymond Philyaw (Jason Ball kick) – 42–28 PHI
- 09:30 PHI – Mike Brown 57 yd kickoff return (Connor Hughes kick) – 49–28 PHI
- 04:52 CLE – Robert Redd 22 yd pass from Raymond Philyaw (Jason Ball kick) – 49–35 PHI
- 03:55 PHI – Larry Brackins 18 yd pass from Matt D'Orazio (Connor Hughes kick) – 56–35 PHI

4th Quarter:

- 08:38 PHI – HOLMES 16 yd pass from Matt D'Orazio (Connor Hughes kick) – 63–35 PHI
- 01:31 PHI – HOLMES 2 yd pass from Matt D'Orazio (Connor Hughes kick) – 70–35 PHI
- Officials: Referee: Pat Garvey; Umpire: Rick Nelson; Linesman: Kavin McGrath; Line judge: Paul Engelberts; Back judge: Greg Wilson; Field judge: Alt: B. McElwee
- Offensive Player of the Game: Matt D'Orazio (PHI)
- Defensive Player of the Game: Eddie Moten (PHI)
- Ironman Player of the Game: Mike Brown (PHI)

=== ArenaBowl XXII: vs. (2) San Jose SaberCats ===
Quarter	1	2	3	4	Total
(2) SJ	14	13	7	22	56
(1) PHI	14	23	9	13	59

at New Orleans Arena, New Orleans, Louisiana

- Date: July 27
- Game time: 3:00 PM EDT
- Game attendance: 17,244

Game information

1st Quarter:

- 11:21 SJO – Rodney Wright 8 yd pass from Mark Grieb (AJ Haglund kick)
- 09:30 PHI – Brent Holmes 34 yd pass from Matt D'Orazio (Connor Hughes kick)
- 05:30 SJO – Jason Geathers 5 yd pass from Mark Grieb (AJ Haglund kick)
- 02:59 PHI – Chris Jackson 34 yd pass from Matt D'Orazio (Connor Hughes kick)

2nd Quarter:

- 14:54 SJO – Jason Geathers 22 yd pass from Mark Grieb (AJ Haglund kick failed)
- 08:59 PHI – Chris Jackson 13 yd pass from Matt D'Orazio (Connor Hughes kick failed)
- 05:31 PHI – Larry Brackins 20 yd pass from Matt D'Orazio (Connor Hughes kick)
- 00:54 PHI – Matt D'Orazio 8 yd run (Connor Hughes kick)
- 00:29 SJO – Jason Geathers 23 yd pass from Mark Grieb (AJ Haglund kick)
- 00:00 PHI – Connor Hughes 20 yd field goal

3rd Quarter:

- 07:56 PHI – Chris Jackson 32 yd pass from Matt D'Orazio (Connor Hughes kick)
- 03:48 PHI – Raheem Orr safety
- 00:00 SJO – Jason Geathers 12 yd pass from Mark Grieb (AJ Haglund kick)

4th Quarter:

- 06:49 PHI – Larry Brackins 7 yd pass from Matt D'Orazio (Connor Hughes kick failed)
- 02:13 SJO – Brian Johnson 3 yd pass from Mark Grieb (Cleannord Saintil pass from Mark Grieb)
- 00:39 PHI – Phil Bogle 2 yd pass from Matt D'Orazio (Connor Hughes kick)
- 00:28 SJO – Rodney Wright 26 yd pass from Mark Grieb (Jason Geathers rush failed)
- 00:17 SJO – Jason Geathers 14 yd pass from Mark Grieb (Jason Geathers rush)
- Officials: Referee: Bill LaMonnier; Umpire: Paul King; Linesman: Bill Ward; Line Judge: R.G. Detiller; Back Judge: James Cole; Alternate: Riley Johnson
- Offensive Player of the Game: Chris Jackson (PHI)
- Defensive Player of the Game: Gabe Nyienhuis (PHI)
- Ironman Player of the Game: Mike Brown (PHI)
- Mitsubishi Motors Arenabowl XXII MVP: Matt D'Orazio (PHI)
