= Clint Stoerner =

American football player (born 1977)

No. 5
- Position: Quarterback

Personal information
- Born: December 29, 1977 (age 48); Baytown, Texas, U.S.
- Listed height: 6 ft 2 in (1.88 m)
- Listed weight: 210 lb (95 kg)

Career information
- High school: Robert E. Lee (Baytown)
- College: Arkansas (1996–1999)
- NFL draft: 2000: undrafted

Career history
- Dallas Cowboys (2000–2002); → Scottish Claymores (2001); Miami Dolphins (2003–2004)*; Amsterdam Admirals (2004); Dallas Desperados (2005); Nashville Kats (2006–2007); Philadelphia Soul (2007); Team Arkansas (2008)*; Alabama Vipers (2010)
- * Offseason or practice squad member only

Awards and highlights
- AFL All-Rookie Team (2005); 2× Second-team All-SEC (1998, 1999); Cotton Bowl Classic champion (2000)

Career NFL statistics
- Passing attempts: 54
- Passing completions: 29
- Completion percentage: 53.7%
- TD–INT: 4–5
- Passing yards: 367
- Passer rating: 61.3
- Stats at Pro Football Reference

Career AFL statistics
- Comp. / Att.: 634 / 1,030
- Passing yards: 7,959
- TD–INT: 146-31
- Passer rating: 108.47
- Rushing TD: 6
- Stats at ArenaFan.com

Clinton Jacob Stoerner (born December 29, 1977) is an American former professional football player who was a quarterback in the National Football League (NFL) for the Dallas Cowboys and Miami Dolphins. He also played in the Arena Football League (AFL) and NFL Europe. He played college football for the Arkansas Razorbacks.

== Early life ==
Stoerner attended Robert E. Lee High School in Baytown, Texas, where he was an excellent student and a letterman in football, basketball, and baseball. In football, as a junior, he started as a wide receiver and as a punter. As a wide receiver, he made 50 receptions for 670 yards (13.40 yards per reception avg.) and as a punter, he was named as an All-District selection. As a senior, Stoerner started as a quarterback and was an All-District selection and an All-State Honorable Mention selection. In baseball, he was an All-District selection. Stoerner graduated in 1996.

== College career ==
After being recruited by a number of colleges and universities, Stoerner chose to play football for head coach Danny Ford at the University of Arkansas for the Razorbacks. It was there that he was mentored by Razorback and former National Football League player Joe Ferguson. Stoerner would set single game records for pass attempts (52 against Alabama in 1999), pass attempts in a season (357 in 1997), career pass attempts (1,023), career pass completions (528), passing yards in a game (387 against LSU in 1997), passing yards in a season (2,629 in 1998), touchdown passes in a season (26 in 1998), career touchdown passes (57) and consecutive passes without an interception (134). Most of Stoerner's passing records have since been eclipsed by former Razorback quarterbacks Ryan Mallett and Tyler Wilson. Prior to his junior season of 1998, Ford was fired by Arkansas athletic director Frank Broyles, who hired Houston Nutt as the new head coach.

Stoerner is known for fumbling the ball in a crucial SEC game at Tennessee. The undefeated #10 ranked Arkansas Razorbacks were leading top-ranked Tennessee 24–22 with 1:43 to play, and the Razorbacks needed only to make a first down so they could run out the clock. On a second down naked bootleg play, Stoerner stumbled on the rollout after right guard Brandon Burlsworth stepped on his foot, and he dropped the ball; Tennessee's Billy Ratliff recovered. A few plays later, Travis Henry scored Tennessee's winning touchdown with 28 seconds left and preserved their national championship season with a 28–24 victory.

Arkansas would be forced to share the 1998 SEC West Division title with Mississippi State, after falling to the Bulldogs in Starkville, Mississippi on a last second field goal, just one week after losing to Tennessee. Arkansas finished the season with a record of 9–3, after losing to a Tom Brady-led Michigan team in the 1999 Citrus Bowl.

Stoerner did gain a measure of redemption the following year in Fayetteville vs Tennessee. Down 24–21 late in the 4th quarter, he completed a pass over the middle to wide receiver Anthony Lucas in the end zone, Arkansas' defense held, and the Stoerner-led Razorbacks upset #3 Tennessee 28–24, mimicking the score from the previous seasons game. Stoerner would finish his college career by leading Arkansas to victory over the Texas Longhorns in the 2000 Cotton Bowl, 27–6. It was Arkansas' first bowl victory since the 1985 Holiday Bowl, and their first win in the Cotton Bowl since the 1976 Cotton Bowl Classic. Arkansas finished the 1999 season with a record of 8–4.

Stoerner is well known in the state of Arkansas for his passes to Anthony Lucas. "Stoerner to Lucas" to this day is a call that is widely known around the state.

== Professional career ==
=== National Football League ===
==== Dallas Cowboys ====
After not being selected in the 2000 NFL draft, Stoerner received a tryout invitation for rookie-minicamp, where he performed well enough to be signed by the Cowboys as an undrafted free agent on May 8. He was waived on August 27 and later signed to the practice squad on October 12. He was released from the team and promoted to the roster two additional times during the season.

In 2001, Stoerner was allocated to the Scottish Claymores of NFL Europe, where he was named the starting quarterback. In the 2001 NFL season, the Cowboys would use a combination of Quincy Carter, Anthony Wright, Stoerner and Ryan Leaf, starting a franchise-high four quarterbacks in a season. Stoerner started two games, including week 7, when the Cowboys were leading the New York Giants 24–7 at halftime, but thanks in part to Stoerner's throwing 4 interceptions, the team lost in overtime. In an unusual move, Stoerner was benched in favor of Leaf late in the fourth quarter of a tie game. It was Leaf's debut with the team, but he could not pull out the victory. Stoerner was released on August 23, 2003, when he was passed on the depth chart by undrafted rookie Tony Romo.

==== Miami Dolphins ====
On September 1, 2003, Stoerner was signed by the Miami Dolphins to their practice squad. He was cut on September 17. Stoerner was re-signed to a futures contract on January 15, 2004, and was allocated to the Amsterdam Admirals of NFL Europe, where he was named the starting quarterback. He was released on September 5.

=== Arena Football League ===
After finding limited success in the NFL, Stoerner moved to the Arena Football League. He was signed by the Dallas Desperados for the 2005 season where he was their starting quarterback. He broke nearly every AFL rookie passing record and was named the league's rookie of the year. After being released by the Desperados, Stoerner signed with the Nashville Kats and split starting quarterback duties with Leon Murray. He returned to the Kats in 2007, but was released after two games. He was then signed by the Philadelphia Soul to back up Juston Wood after starting quarterback Tony Graziani was injured with a separated shoulder four games into the season. Stoerner started the final game of the 2010 season for the Alabama Vipers.

=== All American Football League ===
Stoerner was signed to Team Arkansas in the All American Football League. However, he was released from his contract (along with every other AAFL player) when the league postponed its debut season in 2008.

== Personal life ==
Stoerner is active in charity work in Arkansas, Texas and Tennessee focusing primarily on charities providing help to children with Down syndrome. He also devotes time every year helping children develop their football skills at several camps including the Clint Stoerner Football Camp held every summer in Fayetteville, Arkansas and Little Rock, Arkansas. He had one brother, Ernest Henry "Hank" Stoerner, who died in 2016 from very rare gallbladder cancer. Son of Ernie, retiree of ExxonMobil Baytown.

He had opened an Insurance agency in Central Arkansas called the Stoerner and Havas Insurance Agency. He was an independent insurance agent, focusing his efforts on property and casualty insurance. He is a member of the Professional Insurance Agents Association (PIA).

Stoerner is a sports radio host on Houston-based Sports Radio 610AM KILT (AM), specializing in college and pro football analysis. He married Lorin Lewis, a UT-Austin graduate.
