= Wes Ours =

American football player (born 1977)

No. 40
- Positions: Fullback, linebacker

Personal information
- Born: December 30, 1977 (age 48); Christian County, Kentucky, U.S.
- Listed height: 6 ft 3 in (1.91 m)
- Listed weight: 300 lb (136 kg)

Career information
- High school: Westmar (Lonaconing, Maryland)
- College: West Virginia
- NFL draft: 2001: undrafted

Career history
- Indianapolis Colts (2001); Tennessee Titans (2001); Indianapolis Colts (2001); Pittsburgh Steelers (2003)*; Los Angeles Avengers (2004); Philadelphia Soul (2005–2008)
- * Offseason or practice squad member only

Awards and highlights
- ArenaBowl champion (2008)

Career AFL statistics
- Rushing touchdowns: 23
- Tackles: 26
- Sacks: 1.5
- Stats at Pro Football Reference

John Wesley Ours (born December 30, 1977) is an American former Arena football running back and linebacker. He played college football for the West Virginia Mountaineers. He was nicknamed "Wes Express" in college because of his ability to run over other players. He also was the biggest fullback in the country during his senior season. He was signed as an undrafted free agent by the Indianapolis Colts of the National Football League (NFL). He ended his professional football career by winning ArenaBowl XXII with the Philadelphia Soul of the Arena Football League (AFL) in 2008.

In his career, Ours also played for the AFL's Los Angeles Avengers and the NFL's Pittsburgh Steelers and Tennessee Titans.

== Early life ==
Ours attended Westmar High School in Lonaconing, Maryland, where he rushed for 1,423 yards and 26 touchdowns as a senior.

== College career ==
While at West Virginia, Ours played defensive line, offensive guard and fullback. As a sophomore, he started three games at Fullback. As a junior, he began the season on the defensive line before being switched to offense where he started three games at Left Guard. As a senior, he was the largest Fullback in college football and rushed 29 times for 77 yards and four touchdowns and caught 14 passes for 170 yards. He only totaled 83 rushing yards with four touchdowns and 199 receiving yards for his career, but he blocked for two record breaking running backs: Amos Zereoué and Avon Cobourne.

== Professional career ==
=== National Football League (2001–2003) ===
Ours went unselected in the 2001 NFL draft and signed as an undrafted free agent on April 21 with the Indianapolis Colts. He was then waived by the Colts, and then signed by the Tennessee Titans on September 27. He was cut again, then signed as a free agent by the Colts once more on November 21. He played in one game for the Colts and two games for the Titans in his rookie season, catching one pass for three yards while with the Titans.

In 2002, Ours was with the Colts during their training camp, only to be cut before the season. In 2003, He spent his last season in the National Football League. He signed as a free agent with the Pittsburgh Steelers on January 23, but was released by the Steelers on August 22, one day after catching the game-winning two-point conversion in a 15–14 preseason victory over the Dallas Cowboys.

=== Arena Football League (2004–2008) ===
==== Los Angeles Avengers ====
After being released by the Steelers, Ours signed a two-year contract with the Los Angeles Avengers on November 23. In the 2004 season, Ours was placed on the injured reserve list by the Avengers on February 2. He eventually was activated by the Avengers from the injured reserve list on June 3.

=== Philadelphia Soul ===
In 2005, Ours played in seven games for the Philadelphia Soul. He had four carries for 10 yards and one touchdown. On the defense, he recorded five tackles, one sack, one pass broken up and one forced fumble. In 2006, Ours played in 14 games for the Soul, he was also named Offensive Player of the Game once. He had four receptions for 33 yards and one touchdown for the season, and led the team with 50 carries for 130 yards with 11 touchdowns. He scored a total of 13 touchdowns on the season, and recorded 14 total tackles and two fumble recoveries on the defense. In 2007, Ours played in all 16 games while taking the majority of the rushes. He carried the ball 39 times, for 129 yards and eight touchdowns. He also had 12 receptions for 112 yards and a touchdown. He was first on the team in carries, rushing yards, tied for first with rushing touchdowns, fifth in scoring with 56 points, and seventh with 112 receiving yards. In the first game of 2008, a victory over the Orlando Predators, Ours scored the first touchdown of the game with a seven-yard reception. In the second game of the season, a victory over the Chicago Rush, he made a 20-yard reception. He finished the season with 13 receptions for 96 yards and two touchdowns, and 23 carries for 78 yards and three touchdowns. He also won his first championship on the professional level when the Philadelphia Soul defeated the San Jose SaberCats 59–56 in ArenaBowl XXII.

==== Career summary ====
Ours totaled 347 rushing yards and 23 rushing touchdowns and 29 receptions 240 receiving yards and three receiving touchdowns for his career. On the defense, he totaled 26 career tackles, along with 1.5 sacks, one pass breakup, one forced fumble, and two fumble recoveries.

== Personal life ==
During his career, Ours would live in Keyser, West Virginia in the offseason.

== See also ==
- List of Arena Football League and National Football League players
