= Larry Brackins =

American football player (born 1982)

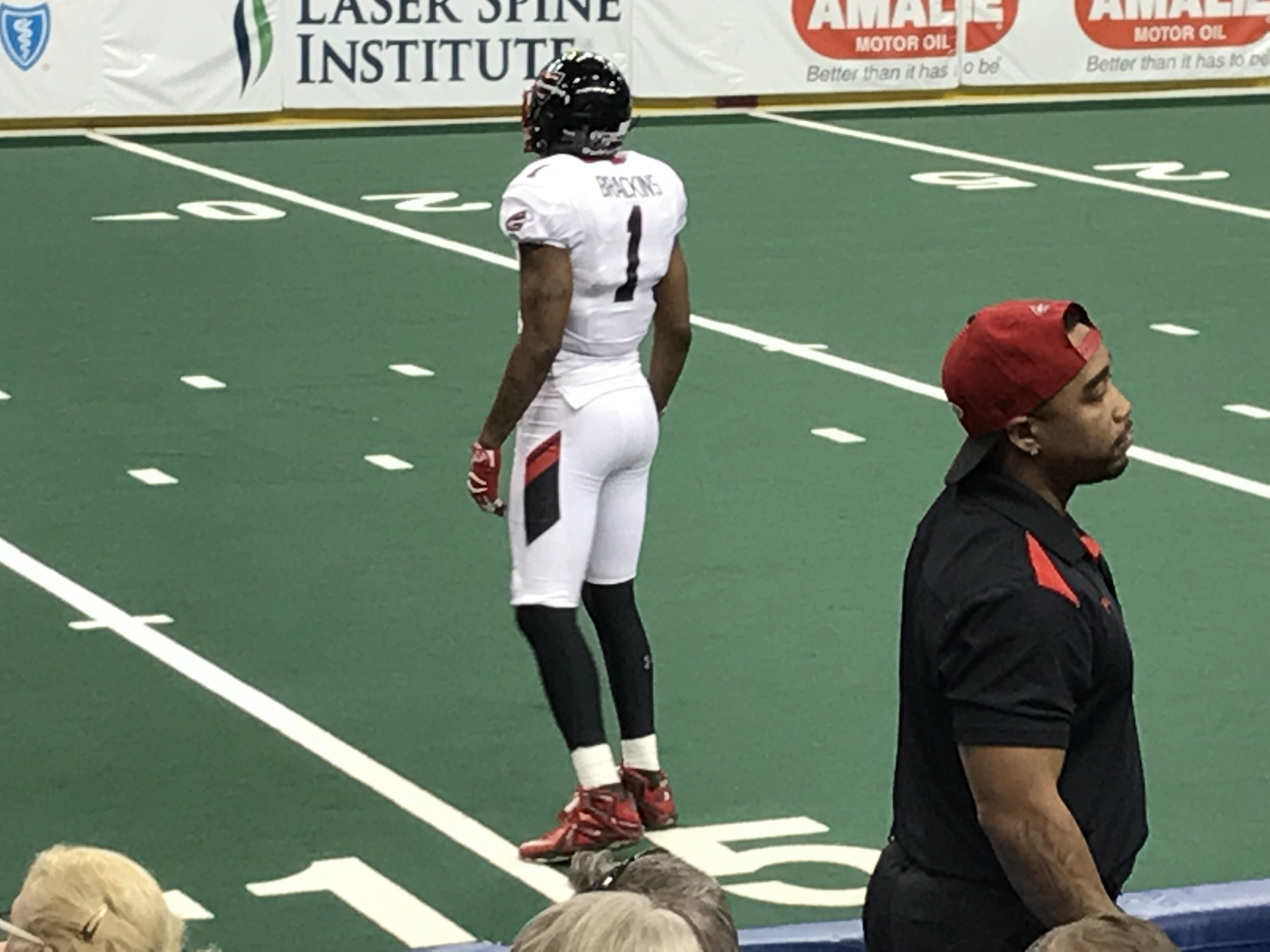
- Brackins with the Cleveland Gladiators in 2017

No. 1, 4
- Position: Wide receiver

Personal information
- Born: November 5, 1982 (age 44); Dothan, Alabama, U.S.
- Listed height: 6 ft 5 in (1.96 m)
- Listed weight: 218 lb (99 kg)

Career information
- High school: Dothan (AL)
- College: Pearl River CC
- NFL draft: 2005: 5th round, 155th overall pick

Career history
- Tampa Bay Buccaneers (2005–2006)*; Philadelphia Soul (2007–2008); New York Jets (2008)*; California Redwoods (2009)*; Dallas Vigilantes (2010); Philadelphia Soul (2011–2014); Orlando Predators (2014–2016); Cleveland Gladiators (2017); Jacksonville Sharks (2018)
- * Offseason or practice squad member only

Awards and highlights
- ArenaBowl champion (2008); 2× All-MACJC (2003–2004); First-team NJCAA (2004)

Career AFL statistics
- Receptions: 484
- Receiving yards: 5,778
- Receiving touchdowns: 177
- Total touchdowns: 187
- Stats at ArenaFan.com

Larry Brackins (born November 5, 1982) is an American former professional football wide receiver. He was selected by the Tampa Bay Buccaneers in the fifth round of the 2005 NFL draft. He played college football at Pearl River Community College. Brackins was also a member of the New York Jets, New York Sentinels, Philadelphia Soul, Dallas Vigilantes, Orlando Predators and Cleveland Gladiators.

== Early life ==
Brackins attended Dothan High School where he was an All-State selection in both basketball and football. During his senior season, he recorded 32 receptions for 643 yards and six touchdowns, and also scored four rushing touchdowns as well. For his high school career, he averaged 31.0 yards per kickoff return and recorded 57 total tackles and one touchdown on an interception return. In basketball, he averaged 17 points, 12 rebounds, and five blocks a game while helping lead his team to the Class 6A state championship game.

== College career ==
Brackins attended Pearl River Community College where he majored in Physical education. As a freshman, he recorded 43 receptions for 772 yards, and nine touchdowns he was also named First-team All-State and First-team All-Region in both football and basketball. For his career, he recorded 101 receptions for 1,834 yards and 19 touchdowns, while starting 23 games. While there he also won numerous awards, such as: 2003 All-MACJC, 2003 All-Region 23, 2004 First-team NJCAA All-American, 2004 All-MACJC, and 2004 All-Region 23.

== Professional career ==
=== Tampa Bay Buccaneers ===
Brackins was selected in the fifth round (155th overall) of the 2005 NFL draft by the Tampa Bay Buccaneers on April 24, 2005, and signed with the team on July 28. He had two receptions for 19 yards in a preseason game vs. the Jacksonville Jaguars. However, he did not make the final roster and was released on September 7. On January 10, 2006, he re-signed with the Buccaneers, and went to training camp with the team. However, once again he was released on July 25.

=== Philadelphia Soul (first stint) ===
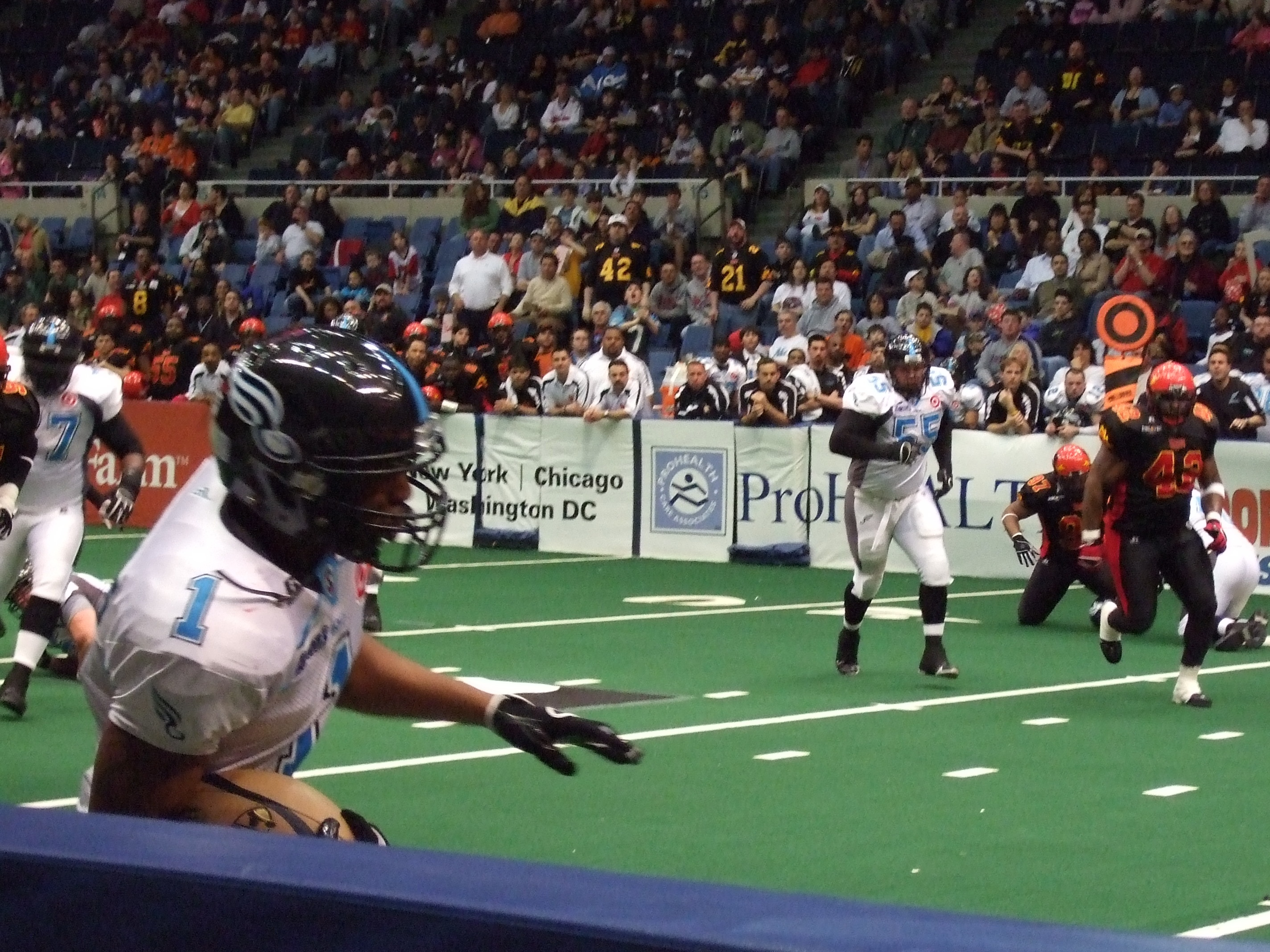
Brackins in a 2007 game against the New York Dragons

In 2007, Brackins signed with the Philadelphia Soul of the Arena Football League (AFL). As a rookie, he played in 10 regular season games and one playoff game. He was named Offensive Player of the Game twice, and recorded 56 receptions for 786 yards, 20 receiving touchdowns and one fumble return for a touchdown. His fumble return TD on March 22, 2007, vs. the Colorado Crush is included as a receiving TD in some records.

In 2008, Brackins finished ranked 17th in the league in receiving with 107 receptions for 1,395 yards and 29 touchdowns with a long of 43. He also finished 14th on the team in tackles with nine, and he returned one kickoff for zero yards. He was also named Offensive Player of the Game on three occasions that season. Brackins was the receiver of the game-winning touchdown pass, in the playoffs against the New York Dragons. It was the first major video review in AFL history. The ruling was a touchdown, and Philadelphia would advance to host the Cleveland Gladiators the next week. Also, on July 27, 2008, he won his first championship of his professional career when the Soul defeated the San Jose SaberCats 59–56 in ArenaBowl XXII.

=== New York Jets ===
On August 19, 2008, Brackins was signed by the New York Jets. However, he was released on August 30 during final cuts.

=== California Redwoods ===
On July 18, 2009, Brackins was drafted by the United Football League's California Redwoods. He signed with the team on September 2.

=== Dallas Vigilantes ===
Brackins was a member of the Dallas Vigilantes. In his first game, he totaled 6 receptions for 104 yards and one touchdown. He finished the season with totals of 61 catches for 734 yards and 20 receiving touchdowns. He also had a net recovery for a touchdown in a game vs. the Tulsa Talons in Week 11.

=== Philadelphia Soul (second stint) ===
Brackins re-joined the Soul in the 2011 season when the team returned to the AFL. However, he was placed on waivers after a poor performance in a game vs. the Tampa Bay Storm in Week 6, but was brought back a week later due to his contributions on Special Teams and to be a Red Zone wide receiver specialist. He earned Ironman of the Game honors in two games later that year, as well as being named MVP and Offensive Player of the Game for his performance vs. the Cleveland Gladiators in Week 18 when he had 9 receptions for 133 yards and 3 touchdowns.

In 2012, Brackins became the Philadelphia Soul's all-time franchise leader in touchdown receptions. He had his best game of the regular season in Week 20 vs. Utah in which he caught 5 passes for 33 yards and 4 touchdowns while earning MVP of the Game honors. Brackins excelled in the 2012 playoffs, scoring 14 total touchdowns in three games and set a Soul franchise record, as well as an Arena Football League playoff record for a single game when he scored 8 touchdowns (5 receiving, 2 rushing, 1 kick return) in the Soul's American Conference championship victory against the Jacksonville Sharks.

The 2013 season saw Brackins catch another 15 touchdown passes for the Soul and in the process, went over 100 total touchdowns for his career, which included his first regular season kick return touchdown. He also recorded the first two interceptions of his career in a game vs. the Iowa Barnstormers while playing the entire game on defense as the Jack Linebacker. He also hauled in another three touchdowns during two playoff games. However, due to a hamstring injury, he was unable to play in ArenaBowl 26, which proved to be significant for the Soul, as they lost in the ArenaBowl to the Arizona Rattlers for the second straight year, struggling to convert in the red zone without Brackins, with two costly turnovers that proved to be the difference. Despite not playing due to his injury, he still earned the distinction of becoming the first professional football player to play on three Philadelphia teams that played in a championship title game.

=== Orlando Predators ===
On April 22, 2014, Brackins was traded to the Orlando Predators for future considerations. In his 12 games with the Predators, Brackins amassed 48 receptions for 612 yards and 17 receiving TDs to bring his career regular season total to 126 receiving touchdowns. He appeared in his third consecutive American Conference Championship game, making 5 catches for 69 yards and a touchdown, while adding two rushes for 13 yards and another touchdown in the Predators' 56–46 loss to the Cleveland Gladiators.

In 2015, Brackins led the Predators in TD receptions with 29, which tied him for 10th overall in the AFL and also tied his career high. With the addition of four rushing touchdowns, his first ones in the regular season, he set a new career-high of 33 total touchdowns in 16 games, helping the Predators win the South Division for the second consecutive season. He also set another career-high with 154 receiving yards in a Week 13 match-up vs. the Arizona Rattlers. He followed that up with a 5 reception, 5 touchdown performance against New Orleans in Week 14 that earned him AFL MVP of the Week honors. Other game honors Brackins' received during the season were: J.Lewis Small Playmaker of the Game in Week 6 and Week 14, in which he was also awarded Cutters Catch of the Game and twice being named Offensive Player of the Game in Week 19 and Week 20. He finished the regular season by scoring touchdowns in Orlando's final nine games. He also continued his great special teams play and even made three kickoffs in emergency duty after Orlando's kicker was injured in the Week 20 game vs. Tampa Bay. Brackins caught a touchdown pass in the Orlando's first round playoff loss to the Jacksonville Sharks.

Brackins played in eight regular season games in 2016, catching 31 passes for 315 yards and 14 touchdowns. He remains in second place all-time in AFL history in TD to reception ratio. He also had one rushing touchdown and one kick return for a TD during the season, as well as a recovered fumble for a touchdown after an Orlando kickoff in a game vs. the Los Angeles Kiss. In the final week of the regular season, Brackins was awards Cutters Catch of the Week for his touchdown grab vs. the Philadelphia Soul. That catch was also #6 on SportsCenter's Top 10 plays for Saturday, July 30. He was also a candidate for both Offensive and Playmaker of the Week. Brackins was named J.Lewis Small Playmaker of the Game in Orlando's final two games, the Week 18 matchup vs. the Soul and the first round of the playoffs vs. the Jacksonville Sharks. He had four receiving touchdowns and over 100 receiving yards in each contest, including his longest postseason TD, a 41-yard catch and run past two defenders.

=== Cleveland Gladiators ===
On February 1, 2017, Brackins was assigned to the Cleveland Gladiators.

=== Jacksonville Sharks ===
Brackins signed with the Jacksonville Sharks in 2018.

== See also ==
- List of Arena Football League and National Football League players
