= J. J. McKelvey =

American football player (born 1980)

Profile
- Position: Wide receiver

Personal information
- Born: March 15, 1980 (age 46); Moncks Corner, South Carolina
- Listed height: 6 ft 1 in (1.85 m)
- Listed weight: 240 lb (109 kg)

Career information
- College: Clemson
- NFL draft: 2003: undrafted

Career history
- Tampa Bay Buccaneers (2003)*; Manchester Wolves (2004–2005); Philadelphia Soul (2006–2007); Utah Blaze (2008); Arizona Rattlers (2010); Chicago Rush (2011)
- * Offseason or practice squad member only

Career AFL statistics
- Receptions: 339
- Receiving yards: 4,109
- Touchdowns: 112
- Stats at ArenaFan.com

J. J. McKelvey (born March 15, 1980) is an American former football wide receiver. He was signed by the Tampa Bay Buccaneers as an undrafted free agent in 2003. He played college football at Clemson.

McKelvey also played for the Philadelphia Soul, Utah Blaze, Arizona Rattlers and Chicago Rush.

On October 13, 2005, the Philadelphia Soul announced the signing of McKelvey.
