= Aric Williams =

American football player (born 1982)

Willamette Bearcats
- Title: Head coach

Personal information
- Born: March 21, 1982 (age 44); Los Angeles, California, U.S.
- Listed height: 6 ft 0 in (1.83 m)
- Listed weight: 180 lb (82 kg)

Career information
- High school: Diamond Bar (Diamond Bar, California)
- College: Oregon State
- NFL draft: 2005: undrafted

Career history

Playing
- Philadelphia Eagles (2005)*; Washington Redskins (2006)*; Philadelphia Soul (2007); Arizona Rattlers (2008, 2010)*
- * Offseason or practice squad member only

Coaching
- Northern Arizona (2009) Graduate assistant; Montana (2010–2014) Cornerbacks coach; Idaho (2015–2017) Cornerbacks coach; San Jose State (2018–2021) Cornerbacks coach; Montana Tech (2022–2023) Defensive coordinator; Willamette (2024–present) Head coach

Awards and highlights
- Second-team All-Pac-10 (2004)

Career AFL statistics
- Total tackles: 58
- Pass deflections: 10
- Interceptions: 2
- Stats at ArenaFan.com

Head coaching record
- Career: 3–17 (.150)

Aric Vencint Williams (born March 21, 1982) is an American college football coach and former defensive back. He is the head football coach for Willamette University, a position he has held since 2024. He was signed by the Philadelphia Eagles as an undrafted free agent in 2005. He played college football at Oregon State.

Williams was also a member of the Washington Redskins and Philadelphia Soul. He is the younger cousin of former NFL safety Shaun Williams.

In 2009, Williams was a graduate assistant at Northern Arizona University. After his playing career ended, Williams became a college football coach, beginning as cornerbacks coach at Montana from 2010 to 2014. From 2015 to 2017, Williams was cornerbacks coach at Idaho. Then from 2018 to 2021, Williams was cornerbacks coach at San Jose State. From 2022 to 2023 he was the defensive coordinator at Montana Tech.

== Head coaching record ==
Year	Team	Overall	Conference	Standing	Bowl/playoffs
Willamette Bearcats (Northwest Conference) (2024–present)
2024	Willamette	2–8	0–7	8th	
2025	Willamette	1–9	0–7	8th	
2026	Willamette	0–0	0–0		
Willamette:		3–17	0–14		
Total:		3–17			
