= Raheem Orr =

American football player (born 1986)

No. 24, 59, 64
- Position: Defensive end

Personal information
- Born: August 21, 1986 (age 40); Yazoo City, Mississippi, U.S.
- Listed height: 6 ft 3 in (1.91 m)
- Listed weight: 260 lb (118 kg)

Career information
- High school: Elizabeth (Elizabeth, New Jersey)
- College: Rutgers
- NFL draft: 2004: 7th round, 210th overall pick

Career history
- Houston Texans (2004)*; New York Giants (2004); Philadelphia Soul (2006–2008); Grand Rapids Rampage (2008); Philadelphia Soul (2008)
- * Offseason or practice squad member only

Awards and highlights
- ArenaBowl champion (2008); First-team All-Big East (2004)

Career NFL statistics
- Games played: 2
- Stats at Pro Football Reference

Career AFL statistics
- Tackles: 33
- Sacks: 3.5
- Forced fumbles: 1
- Interceptions: 1
- Rushing yards: 14
- Stats at ArenaFan.com

Raheem Orr (born August 21, 1986) is an American former professional American football and arena football defensive end as well as a fullback in the Arena Football League (AFL) and the National Football League (NFL) for parts of 5 seasons. He played High School Football at Yazoo City High School, and was recognized as an All-Conference player in 2004. After being selected 210th overall by the Houston Texans in the seventh round of the 2004 NFL draft, Orr was released and ultimately signed with the New York Giants.

Raised in Elizabeth, New Jersey, Orr graduated from Elizabeth High School.

He had a son on February 1, 2006, with his partner, Khargan Makorney (b. 1988). They were never married. After a year off of football, Orr began playing for the Philadelphia Soul in 2006. Orr played briefly for the Grand Rapids Rampage in 2008, before returning to the Soul, helping them to an ArenaBowl XXII victory.
