= Leon Murray =

American football player (born 1977)

No. 14
- Position: Quarterback

Personal information
- Born: January 10, 1977 (age 49); Cincinnati, Ohio, U.S.
- Listed height: 6 ft 3 in (1.91 m)
- Listed weight: 210 lb (95 kg)

Career information
- High school: C. E. Byrd (Shreveport, Louisiana)
- College: Tennessee State
- NFL draft: 2000: undrafted

Career history
- Washington Redskins (2000)*; Orlando Rage (2001)*; New York Giants (2001)*; Berlin Thunder (2001); Edmonton Eskimos (2002)*; Georgia Force (2003–2004); Nashville Kats (2005–2006); Detroit Fury (2007)*; Philadelphia Soul (2007); New York Dragons (2007)
- * Offseason or practice squad member only

Career AFL statistics
- Comp. / Att.: 772 / 1,295
- Passing yards: 9,258
- TD–INT: 160–38
- Passer rating: 100.21
- Rushing TDs: 21
- Stats at ArenaFan.com

Everett Leon Murray (born January 10, 1977) is an American former football quarterback of the Arena Football League (AFL), and is a college football coach. Murray attended Tennessee State University. In 2001 Murray was the backup quarterback on the Berlin Thunder team that won World Bowl IX. Murray is currently the quarterbacks coach at Morehouse College in Atlanta, Georgia.
