= Idris Price =

American football player (born 1977)

Profile
- Positions: Linebacker, fullback

Personal information
- Born: August 30, 1977 (age 49); Norwalk, Connecticut, U.S.
- Listed height: 6 ft 2 in (1.88 m)
- Listed weight: 240 lb (109 kg)

Career information
- High school: Brien McMahon (Norwalk)
- College: New Haven (CT)
- NFL draft: 2002: undrafted

Career history
- New York Jets (2002)*; New England Patriots (2002)*; Tampa Bay Buccaneers (2002–2003)*; Frankfurt Galaxy (2003); Orlando Predators (2004–2006); Philadelphia Soul (2007); New York Dragons (2008)
- * Offseason or practice squad member only

Awards and highlights
- Super Bowl champion (XXXVII); World Bowl champion (XI)
- Stats at ArenaFan.com

Idris Price (born August 30, 1977) is an American former professional football player who was a linebacker/fullback for the Orlando Predators, Philadelphia Soul and New York Dragons of the Arena Football League (AFL). He was also a member of the New York Jets, New England Patriots, Tampa Bay Buccaneers and Frankfurt Galaxy. He won Super Bowl XXXVII as a member of the Buccaneers.

== Early life ==
Price began his football career at Brien McMahon High School in Norwalk, Connecticut. During his junior year, the Senators recorded 9 shutouts throughout the season and won a state championship. In one account the referee had asked Idris to remove his shoulder pads. Idris, in fact, did not have on shoulder pads, rather he was just that broad of a man. During his high school years in several games, it took as many as 4 or 5 defenders to actually take him down.

== College career ==
Price graduated from the University of New Haven and was a two-year letterman in football. Idris was looking at top tier Division I-A schools for football, along the lines of Syracuse, Clemson, and Rutgers.

== Professional career ==
=== New York Jets ===
Price signed with the New York Jets on April 26, 2002. after going undrafted in the 2002 NFL draft. He was released by the Jets on August 26, 2002.

=== New England Patriots ===
Price was signed to the New England Patriots' practice squad on November 20, 2002. He was released by the Patriots on December 11, 2002.

=== Tampa Bay Buccaneers/Frankfurt Galaxy ===
Price was signed to the practice squad of the Tampa Bay Buccaneers on December 17, 2002. The Buccaneers won Super Bowl XXXVII against the Oakland Raiders on January 26, 2003. On February 5, 2003, he was allocated to NFL Europe to play for the Frankfurt Galaxy. The Galaxy won World Bowl XI against the Rhein Fire on June 14, 2003. He was released by the Buccaneers on August 29, 2003.

=== Orlando Predators ===
Price signed with the Orlando Predators on October 20, 2003. He played for the Predators from 2004 to 2006.

=== Philadelphia Soul ===
Price was signed by the Philadelphia Soul on October 9, 2006. He played for the Soul during the 2007 season.

=== New York Dragons ===
Price signed with the New York Dragons on October 31, 2007. and played for the team during the 2008 season.

== Coaching years ==
In the offseason of the AFL, Price gave back to the community by returning to his alma mater and coaching at McMahon. After watching Rob Trifone cross the border and begin coaching at Darien High School, Price followed in suit. In 2013, Price began coaching at St. Luke's School in New Canaan, Connecticut.
