= Sean Scott (American football) =

American football player (born 1978)

No. 86, 88
- Positions: Wide receiver, linebacker

Personal information
- Born: September 25, 1978 (age 48); Philadelphia, Pennsylvania, U.S.
- Listed height: 6 ft 1 in (1.85 m)
- Listed weight: 196 lb (89 kg)

Career information
- High school: Archbishop Carroll (Radnor, Pennsylvania)
- College: Millersville
- NFL draft: 2001: undrafted

Career history
- Philadelphia Eagles (2001–2002)*, (2003)*; Berlin Thunder (2003); Philadelphia Soul (2004–2007); Cleveland Gladiators (2008); Philadelphia Soul (2008)
- * Offseason or practice squad member only

Awards and highlights
- ArenaBowl champion (2008); 4× All-PSAC (1997–2000)

Career AFL statistics
- Receptions: 274
- Receiving yards: 3,207
- Receiving touchdowns: 64
- Stats at ArenaFan.com

Sean Scott (born September 25, 1978) is an American former professional Arena Football League (AFL) wide receiver/linebacker for the Philadelphia Soul and Cleveland Gladiators. He went to Millersville University.

== Early life ==
Scott attended Archbishop Carroll High School in Radnor, Pennsylvania and was a star in football and basketball. Sean spent the preseason in 2001 on the Eagles roster.

== College career ==
While attending Millersville University, Scott was a four-year letterman, and a four-time All-PSAC selection. He finished his career as the school's all-time leader in receptions (240), receiving yards (3,293), touchdowns (27).

== Professional career ==
While on the Philadelphia Eagles roster, Scott made the game winning catch from A.J. Feeley against the New York Jets in the preseason finale, earning him Player of the Game honors. Scott did not make the 53-man roster, but spent the rest of the 2001 season on the practice squad. He resigned from the Eagles and participated in the 2002 and 2003 Eagles training camps before making his debut in the Arena Football League in 2004 for the Philadelphia Soul. In 2006, while on the Philadelphia Soul, He came up 1 yard short of 1,000 yards receiving, and led his team in Receiving Yards that season.
