= Mike Mabry =

American football player (born 1980)

No. 65
- Position: Center

Personal information
- Born: April 26, 1980 (age 46); Houston, Texas, U.S.
- Listed height: 6 ft 1 in (1.85 m)
- Listed weight: 300 lb (136 kg)

Career information
- High school: Dayton (Dayton, Texas)
- College: UCF
- NFL draft: 2003: 7th round, 250th overall pick

Career history
- Baltimore Ravens (2003)*; Cincinnati Bengals (2003–2004)*; → Cologne Centurions (2004); Atlanta Falcons (2004)*; → Cologne Centurions (2005); Philadelphia Soul (2006–2008); Cleveland Browns (2006)*; California Redwoods/Sacramento Mountain Lions (2009–2010); Jacksonville Sharks (2011)
- * Offseason or practice squad member only

Awards and highlights
- ArenaBowl champion (2008); Second-team All-Arena (2007)
- Stats at ArenaFan.com

Mike Allen Mabry (born April 26, 1980) is an American former professional football center. He was selected by the Baltimore Ravens in the seventh round of the 2003 NFL draft. He played college football at UCF.

Mabry was also a member of the Cincinnati Bengals, Cologne Centurions, Atlanta Falcons, Philadelphia Soul, Cleveland Browns, California Redwoods/Sacramento Mountain Lions and Jacksonville Sharks.

== Early life ==
Mabry was born in Houston, Texas. He attended Dayton High School in Dayton, Texas, participating in football, basketball, track, and powerlifting.

== College career ==
Mabry first played college football at Southwest Mississippi Community College from 1999 to 2000. He earned All-Region, All-Mississippi junior college and MVP Lineman of the South honors in his sophomore year in 2000.

Mabry transferred to play for the UCF Knights from 2001 to 2002 and was a starter both years. He started 23 straight games for the Knights. He majored in liberal studies at UCF.

== Professional career ==
Mabry was selected by the Baltimore Ravens in the seventh round, with the 250th overall pick, of the 2003 NFL draft. He officially signed with the team on July 27. He was waived on August 25, 2003.

Mabry was signed to the practice squad of the Cincinnati Bengals on December 9, 2003. He was allocated to NFL Europe in 2004 to play for the Cologne Centurions. He played in 10 games, starting four, for the Centurions during the 2004 NFL Europe season. Mabry was waived by the Bengals on August 23, 2004. He was signed to the Bengals' practice squad on September 14 but was later released on November 30, 2004.

He was signed to the practice squad of the Atlanta Falcons on December 21, 2004. Mabry re-signed with the team on January 27, 2005. He was allocated to NFL Europe to play for the Centurions for the second straight year. Mabry started all 10 games for the Centurions during the 2005 NFL Europe season. He was waived by the Falcons on September 3, 2005.

Mabry signed with the Philadelphia Soul of the Arena Football League (AFL) on October 13, 2005. He spent time playing both offensive line and defensive line during his time in the AFL as the league played under ironman rules. He played in all 16 games for the Soul in 2006, recording six solo tackles, four assisted tackles and two sacks. Mabry return to the Soul in 2007 after his stint with the Browns. He played in all 16 games for the second consecutive year, earning second-team All-Arena honors. He played his final season for the Soul in 2008, winning ArenaBowl XXII. The 2009 AFL season was cancelled.

He signed with the Cleveland Browns on August 6, 2006. He was waived on August 24, 2006.

Mabry appeared in six games, all starts, for the California Redwoods of the United Football League in 2009. The Redwoods became the Sacramento Mountain Lions in 2010. He started all eight games for the Mountain Lions during the 2010 season.

Mabry was assigned to the Jacksonville Sharks of the AFL on August 9, 2011.
