= Gabe Nyenhuis =

American gridiron football player (born 1981)

No. 97
- Position: Defensive lineman

Personal information
- Born: June 26, 1981 (age 45); Corpus Christi, Texas, U.S.
- Listed height: 6 ft 4 in (1.93 m)
- Listed weight: 275 lb (125 kg)

Career information
- High school: St. Charles (IL) East
- College: Colorado
- NFL draft: 2004: undrafted

Career history
- Seattle Seahawks (2004)*; Jacksonville Jaguars (2004)*; Atlanta Falcons (2004–2005)*; Indianapolis Colts (2005–2006)*; Philadelphia Soul (2007–2008); Saskatchewan Roughriders (2009)*; Dallas Vigilantes* (2010); Tulsa Talons (2010); San Jose SaberCats (2011–2012)
- * Offseason or practice squad member only

Awards and highlights
- ArenaBowl champion (2008); AFL Defensive Player of the Year (2010); AFL Lineman of the Year (2010); First-team All-Arena (2010); Second-team All-Arena (2008)

Career AFL statistics
- Total tackles: 76
- Sacks: 35
- Forced fumbles: 22
- Interceptions: 2
- Stats at ArenaFan.com

Gabriel Nyenhuis (born June 26, 1981) is a former professional gridiron football defensive lineman. His nickname at the San Jose SaberCats according to some fans is Hunger Games, as he is seen reading the books during practice. He was named AFL Defensive Player of the Year as well as Lineman of the Year in 2010. He was signed as an undrafted free agent by the Seattle Seahawks in 2004. He played college football for the Colorado Buffaloes.

Nyenhuis was also a member of the Jacksonville Jaguars, Atlanta Falcons, Indianapolis Colts, Philadelphia Soul, Saskatchewan Roughriders, Dallas Vigilantes and Tulsa Talons.

== Professional career ==
=== Seattle Seahawks ===
Nyenhuis went undrafted in the 2004 NFL draft and was signed by the Seattle Seahawks on April 30, 2004. He was released as a late training camp cut on August 31.

=== Jacksonville Jaguars ===
On September 7, 2004, the Jacksonville Jaguars signed Nyenhuis to their practice squad.

=== Indianapolis Colts ===
He re-signed on January 24, 2006.

He was released on August 18, 2006.

=== Saskatchewan Roughriders ===
Nyenhuis signed with the Saskatchewan Roughriders on April 15, 2009. He was released on September 16.

=== Philadelphia Soul ===
In 2007, Nyenhuis signed with the Philadelphia Soul of the Arena Football League. Nyenhuis would play two years with the Soul, posting 9.5 sacks in 2008 to lead the Soul.

=== Tulsa Talons ===
In 2010, Nyenhuis signed with the Tulsa Talons. Nyenhuis posted career highs in tackles (19) and sacks (15.5) on his way to winning the Arena Football League Defensive Player of the Year Award.

=== San Jose SaberCats ===
Since 2011, Nyenhuis has played for the San Jose SaberCats. He has yet to replicate his 2010 season.
