= Bryan Save =

American football player (born 1981)

No. 98
- Position: Defensive tackle

Personal information
- Born: December 16, 1981 (age 44); Honolulu, Hawaii, U.S.
- Listed height: 6 ft 1 in (1.85 m)
- Listed weight: 313 lb (142 kg)

Career information
- College: Colorado State
- NFL draft: 2004: undrafted

Career history
- Indianapolis Colts (2004)*; San Francisco 49ers (2004)*; Baltimore Ravens (2004)*; Tampa Bay Buccaneers (2005)*; Cologne Centurions (2006); Denver Broncos (2006)*; Philadelphia Soul (2007–2008); New York Sentinels (2009); Spokane Shock (2010)*; Florida Tuskers (2010)
- * Offseason or practice squad member only

Awards and highlights
- ArenaBowl champion (2008); 2× First-team All-NFL Europe (2005, 2006); AFL All-Rookie Team (2007); Second-team All-Arena (2008); 2× First-team All-UFL (2009, 2010); First-team All-MW (2003)

Career AFL statistics
- Total tackles: 85
- Sacks: 14
- Forced fumbles: 4
- Stats at ArenaFan.com

Bryan Save [Sah-vay] (born December 16, 1981) is an American former football defensive tackle. He was signed by the Indianapolis Colts as an undrafted free agent in 2004. He played college football at Colorado State.

Save was also a member of the San Francisco 49ers, Baltimore Ravens, Tampa Bay Buccaneers, Cologne Centurions, Denver Broncos, Philadelphia Soul, New York Sentinels, Spokane Shock, and Florida Tuskers.

== Professional career ==
=== Cologne Centurions ===
Save was selected by the Cologne Centurions in the fourth round of the 2006 NFL Europe Free Agent Draft.

=== Florida Tuskers ===
On June 7, 2010, Save requested a trade to the Florida Tuskers and was acquired from the Hartford Colonials in exchange for Keith Gray. This was the first documented trade in the UFL history.
