= Tony Graziani =

American football player (born 1973)

No. 7, 13
- Position: Quarterback

Personal information
- Born: December 23, 1973 (age 52); Las Vegas, Nevada, U.S.
- Listed height: 6 ft 3 in (1.91 m)
- Listed weight: 210 lb (95 kg)

Career information
- High school: Thomas Downey (Modesto, California)
- College: Oregon
- NFL draft: 1997: 7th round, 204th overall pick

Career history
- Atlanta Falcons (1997–2000); Barcelona Dragons (2000); Cleveland Browns (2000); Los Angeles Avengers (2001–2004); Philadelphia Soul (2005–2008)

Awards and highlights
- ArenaBowl XXII champion (2008); First-team All-Arena (2004)

Career NFL statistics
- Passing attempts: 174
- Passing completions: 85
- Completion percentage: 48.9%
- TD–INT: 2–8
- Passing yards: 999
- Passer rating: 51.4
- Stats at Pro Football Reference

Career AFL statistics
- Comp. / Att.: 1,812 / 2,943
- Passing yards: 23,606
- TD-INT: 494-68
- Passer rating: 116.77
- Rushing TD: 21
- Stats at ArenaFan.com

Anthony Robert Graziani (born December 23, 1973) is an American former professional football player who was a quarterback for the Atlanta Falcons of the National Football League (NFL), and the Los Angeles Avengers and Philadelphia Soul of the Arena Football League (AFL). He played college football for the Oregon Ducks.

Graziani was the highest-paid player in the history of the AFL, earning over $200,000 for the 2007 season.

== Early life ==
Graziani attended Thomas Downey High School in Modesto, California. As a quarterback, he passed for 3,956 yards and 35 touchdowns in his prep career while leading his team to a share of the Central California Conference title.

== College career ==
Graziani was a four-year letterman the University of Oregon, playing in 28 games in his collegiate football career. At Oregon he majored in political science. He accumulated the following stats:

- Completed 362-of-670 for 4,498 yards and 25 touchdowns
- Was 92-of-171 for 1,353 yards and eight touchdowns during an injury-plagued senior season in 1996
- As a junior, led the Ducks to the Cotton Bowl Classic, completing 231-of-426 passes for 2,604 yards and 13 touchdowns
- Passed for 287 yards in Oregon's first victory over USC at the Coliseum in 23 years in 1994
- Was on the Ducks team that went to the 1995 Rose Bowl

== Professional career ==
=== National Football League ===
Graziani was a seventh round pick of the Atlanta Falcons in the 1997 NFL draft. He played for the Falcons for three seasons. During his NFL career, he threw for 999 yards, two touchdowns with eight interceptions. He also had 16 carries for 51 yards. Also, during his one-year tenure with the Cleveland Browns, he played for the Barcelona Dragons, of NFL Europe, in 2000.

=== Arena Football League ===
==== Los Angeles Avengers ====
Graziani signed with the Los Angeles Avengers prior to the 2001 season. He completed 23 out of 37 passes that season for 262 yards, seven touchdowns and one interception. He became the starter in 2002 as he completed 282 out of 467 passes for 3,568 yards, 67 touchdowns, and 1 interception. In 2003, he completed 304 of 495 passes for 4,290 yards, 96 touchdowns, and 15 interceptions. In 2004, he had his finest season as he completed 333 of 510 passes for 4,265 yards, 99 touchdowns, and five interceptions.

==== Philadelphia Soul ====
Prior to the 2005 season, Graziani signed with the Philadelphia Soul and became the highest-paid player in the league. He completed 328 out of 555 passes that year for 4,272 yards, 90 touchdowns, and 15 interceptions as Philadelphia had a disappointing 6–10 season. In an injury-riddled 2006, he completed 232 of 389 passes for 2,981 yards, 41 touchdowns, and 11 interceptions, but Philadelphia went 9-7 and made the playoffs for the first time ever. Through Week 4 of the 2007 Arena Football League season, Graziani had completed 75 of 116 passes for 1,041 yards, 24 touchdowns, and only three interceptions. At the time, the Soul were undefeated at 5–0. In Graziani's third start against the Colorado Crush he threw for eight touchdowns topping out over 300 yards and only one interception. He suffered a shoulder injury in week 6, and was unable to play for the next five games. He came back in week 12 against the New Orleans VooDoo and went 7-of-15 for 81 yards and four touchdowns. The Soul won the game 78–34.

During Week 1 of the 2008 season Graziani set the Soul franchise single game record for most touchdown passes in a game (nine). In Week 3, he suffered a sprained ankle. He was scheduled to return Week 7 against the San Jose SaberCats, but before the game it was decided he wouldn't play. He returned Week 8 against the Columbus Destroyers, but left the game with an injury. He briefly returned against the Dallas Desperados, but left the game with a concussion. He did not play in the AFL after that.

== Post-football career ==
Graziani has worked as a real estate/insurance agent. He has also been an occasional football analyst for the ESPN family of networks. He is the co-founder of TD Desert Properties. In 2011, he was named field representative for Assemblyman Brian Nestande, who represents portions of the Inland Empire and Coachella Valley. He makes his home in Bend, Oregon where he sits on the board for The Office Group, an academic mentoring program for youth. He is also the assistant head football coach at Summit High School.

Graziani has worked as an analyst on the Sports USA Radio Network.

== See also ==
- List of NFL quarterbacks who have posted a passer rating of zero
- List of Arena Football League and National Football League players
