= Philadelphia Soul =

Arena football team

Logo

General information
- Founded: 2004
- Folded: 2019
- Headquartered: Philadelphia, Pennsylvania, U.S.
- Colors: Light blue, gray, white, black
- Mascot: Soul Man
- PhiladelphiaSoul.com

Personnel
- Owners: Trifecta Sports and Entertainment
- General manager: Beau Bell
- Head coach: Clint Dolezel

Team history
- Philadelphia Soul (2004–2019)

Home fields
- Spectrum (part-time, 2004–2008); Wells Fargo Center (2004–2008, 2011–2019); Boardwalk Hall (Atlantic City, one game, 2015); PPL Center (Allentown, Pennsylvania, late season 2016)

League / conference affiliations
- Arena Football League (2004–2019): National Conference (2004–2008); American Conference (2011–2016); East Division (2004–2008, 2011–2015)

Championships
- League championships: 3: 2008, 2016, 2017
- Conference championships: 4: 2008, 2012, 2013, 2016
- Division championships: 4: East: 2008, 2012, 2013, 2015

Playoff appearances (11)
- 2006, 2007, 2008, 2012, 2013, 2014, 2015, 2016, 2017, 2018, 2019

The Philadelphia Soul were a professional arena football team based in Philadelphia that competed in the Arena Football League (AFL) from 2004 to 2007 and from 2011 to 2019. The Soul made five ArenaBowl appearances, winning their first appearance (2008 against the San Jose SaberCats) and losing their next two appearances (2012 and 2013 both to the Arizona Rattlers). The Soul won in their fourth appearance, against the Rattlers in 2016, winning 56–42. They also won in their fifth appearance in 2017 against the Tampa Bay Storm, winning 44–40.

The club was established in 2004 when a group, led by Jon Bon Jovi, secured the rights to an AFL franchise in Philadelphia. The AFL folded before the proposed 2009 season was to begin, but was purchased and revived in 2010. After two seasons of inactivity in 2009 and 2010, the Soul returned in 2011 headed by Ron Jaworski. Following the 2019 season, the AFL ceased operations again.

== History ==
=== Jon Bon Jovi era (2004–2008) ===
The team was owned by co-majority owners Jon Bon Jovi and Craig Spencer along with minority owners Richie Sambora, Ron "Jaws" Jaworski (former QB of the NFL's Philadelphia Eagles) and Leo Carlin, Jr. The Soul began play in February 2004, and played its home games at the Wells Fargo Center (then known as the Wachovia Center), home of the Philadelphia Flyers of the NHL and the Philadelphia 76ers of the NBA. When there was a scheduling conflict with the NBA or NHL, games were played at the now-demolished Wachovia Spectrum—the former home of the Flyers, 76ers, Philadelphia Phantoms AHL hockey team and the Philadelphia KiXX MISL soccer franchise. The Soul played in the Eastern Division of the National Conference of the AFL. The name "Soul" referred to the Philadelphia soul music genre, a play on Bon Jovi's career as a musician (Bon Jovi's style of pop rock, however, bore no resemblance to the genre of music known as Philadelphia soul). The official mascot of the Soul was the Blues Brother-like "Soul Man".

In 2005, the Soul began the season by beating the Austin Wranglers 66–35. However, after five games, the Soul had two wins and three losses, which led to the firing of head coach Michael Trigg.

The Soul made Tony Graziani the highest-paid player in Arena League history. The move left them with little money under the salary cap to improve their defense, and as a result, they were not in competition for the playoffs. The elimination came even after NBC scheduled 14 games of the Soul to be shown on national or regional television.

In 2006, the Soul began 2–0. They went 2–0 against division rival Dallas Desperados (who finished a league best 13–3), and finished the season at 9–7 and earned their first playoff berth through the wild card. In their wild card playoff game, the Soul defeated the Austin Wranglers in Austin, 52–35. The score was 21–21 at halftime, but the #5 seed Soul outscored the #4 Wranglers 21–7 in the third quarter and ran away with the game. The Soul lost their Divisional Round Playoff game 31–27 to the Orlando Predators in the infamous "round of golf", so-called because viewers missed much of the 1st quarter of that game and another AFL game being broadcast simultaneously due to a PGA Golf tournament that was televised on NBC.

The Soul started 4–0 in 2007 before losing to the Georgia Force, 57–49. Afterwards, they lost on a Monday night contest to their division rival, the Dallas Desperados, 51–41. In the game, Tony Graziani left the game early with a separated left shoulder from a sack by OL/DL Rickie Simpkins. He would miss the next four weeks, all losses, dropping the team to 4–6. Graziani returned in week 12 against the New Orleans VooDoo and led the team to its highest scoring output in its short franchise history, winning 78–34. In a Week 16 "win-and-in" matchup with the Columbus Destroyers, Graziani led the Soul down the field and threw a touchdown pass to Charles Pauley with seven seconds left, giving the Soul a 56–53 win and their second trip to the playoffs in their four-year history. In the playoffs, they defeated the Orlando Predators 41–26, then traveled to Atlanta to take on the Georgia Force in the Divisional Round, but lost 65–39.

In 2008, the Soul signed WR Chris Jackson in the off-season. He was united with a former teammate in Tony Graziani. In the offseason the Soul were picked by many as the favorite to win the championship. However, after another good start, once again Graziani was injured. He was replaced by Matt D'Orazio. Unlike previous years, in 2008 the Soul backup was able to keep the team going. He played well enough that when Graziani was healthy once more, the coaching staff decided to allow D'Orazio to keep the starting job. The Soul finished the 2008 season with a 13–3 record and earned a first-round bye. In the divisional round the Soul defeated the New York Dragons. In the conference finals the Soul were able to defeat the Cleveland Gladiators to earn their first berth to the ArenaBowl. They then won their first ArenaBowl on Sunday, July 27, 2008 in a 59–56 win over the San Jose SaberCats in ArenaBowl XXII.

The team suspended operations along with the rest of the Arena Football League in 2009. Bon Jovi would then form another ownership group with members of Maple Leaf Sports & Entertainment five years later seeking to purchase the National Football League's Buffalo Bills; the Bon Jovi consortium was outbid by Terry and Kim Pegula.

=== Ron Jaworski era (2011–2019) ===
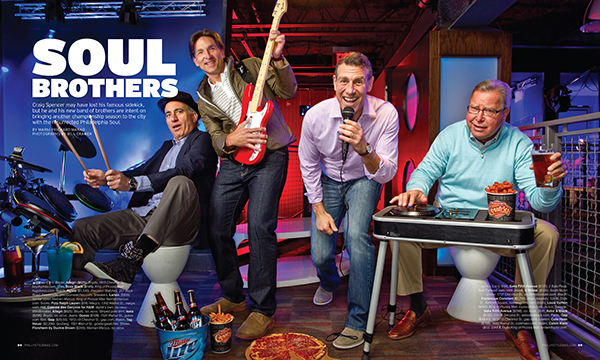
Cosmo DeNicola, Craig Spencer, Pete Ciarrocchi, Ron Jaworski in 2011

On February 17, 2010, the Arena Football League extended an offer to the Soul to make a return to arena football. That offer was accepted, as the Soul returned in 2011 playing all their home games at the then-recently renamed Wells Fargo Center. Jaworski and Spencer returned from the prior ownership group, and Pete Ciarrocchi (owner of local sports bar Chickie's and Pete's) and Cosmo DeNicola (who was the owner of the Wilkes-Barre/Scranton Pioneers from the now-defunct af2 league) joined the new Soul's ownership. Notably absent was Jon Bon Jovi, who cited his group's tour as a reason for declining ownership, but still maintains his support for the Soul and their new ownership. The team hired future Arena Football Hall of Famer, Mike Hohensee, to lead the revived team. Despite high expectations, the Soul stumbled out of the gate and never recovered, finishing just 6–12, last place in the East.

In 2012, the Soul began the season with new head coach Doug Plank. They finished the regular season with the league's best record at 15–3. They would advance to ArenaBowl XXV, but lost to the Arizona Rattlers 72–54. Less than a week later, Plank announced his resignation.

In 2013, the Soul hired offensive coordinator, Clint Dolezel, to succeed Plank. Dolezel's familiarity with many of the Soul players made it easy for the team to maintain success through the 2013 season. The Soul finished the regular season 12–6, winning the Eastern Division for a second season in a row. Dolezel would lead the Soul back to ArenaBowl XXVI, but the team once again fell to the Rattlers 48–39.

In September 2014, New Orleans Saints wide receiver Marques Colston bought a share of the team; Jaworski remained the majority owner. In August 2015, additional pieces of the team were sold to Colston's Saints teammate, Philadelphia native Jahri Evans, and to former Eagles coach Dick Vermeil.

In 2016, the Soul finished the regular season with a 13–3 record, the best in the American Conference. In the playoffs, they first defeated the Tampa Bay Storm, then the Jacksonville Sharks, to claim the American Conference Championship. In ArenaBowl XXIX, they defeated the National Conference Champion Arizona Rattlers 56–42 to claim their second AFL Championship.

Before 2017, the AFL contracted to five teams and the conferences were abolished. In 2017, the Soul went 13–1. On August 12, 2017, the Soul defeated the Baltimore Brigade 69–54 to advance to their fifth ArenaBowl in ArenaBowl XXX on August 26, 2017, at Wells Fargo Center against the Tampa Bay Storm. In that game, the Soul came back from an ArenaBowl record 13-point deficit to win 44–40 and repeat as AFL Champions.

In March 2017, the Philadelphia Soul signed a deal with Total Turf Experience in Mantua Township, New Jersey. The indoor practice facility became home to the Soul for its daily practices, team events, tryouts, combines, and clinics.

=== Revival ===
An unrelated traveling team bearing the same name played in the short-lived 2024 Arena Football League.

=== Franchise highlights ===
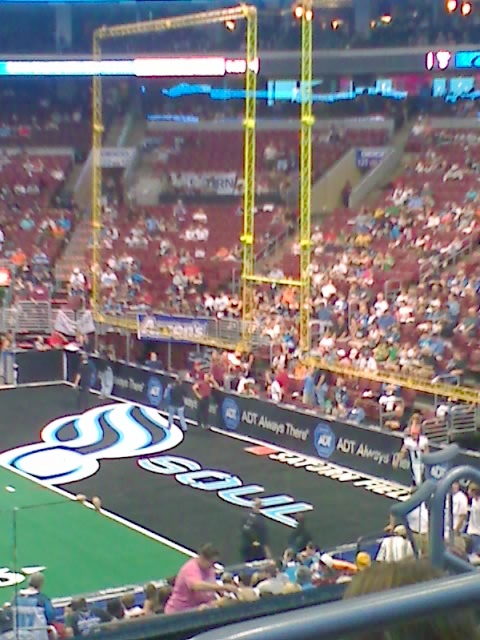
One of the Philadelphia Soul's end zones

- On Sunday, February 13, 2005, in a week-three home game against the Nashville Kats, quarterback Tony Graziani threw for six touchdowns, one of which came on a third-quarter play from their own five-yard line. Graziani got the snap, tripped over his own fullback's foot, and threw a 45-yard touchdown pass to OS Steve Smith off his own knee. The Soul won the game. It appeared on The Best Damn Sports Show Period's Top 50 Spectacular Plays.
- On Saturday, April 24, 2004, the Soul were trailing to the New York Dragons by a point with 1.3 seconds left in the fourth quarter. The Soul had the ball at their own two-yard line. Ken Hinsley kicked a field goal from the back of the endzone which just barely made it over the crossbar as the buzzer went off, winning the game for the Soul, 60–58.
- Since its inception, the Philadelphia Soul has been deeply involved in the community. In 2006, The Philadelphia Soul Foundation was formed to further the organization's commitment to the Philadelphia area. Former President Bill Clinton joined Soul majority owner Jon Bon Jovi on stage to announce a project that would rehab 15 townhouses in North Philadelphia. Scheduled to open in November 2007, the homes will also be eco-friendly, not only saving money for its new tenants, but improving the environment as well.
- On Saturday, July 12, 2008, the Philadelphia Soul defeated the Cleveland Gladiators 70–35 in the AFL National Conference Title game, earning their first ArenaBowl berth in ArenaBowl XXII.
- On Sunday, July 27, 2008, the Philadelphia Soul defeated the San Jose SaberCats in ArenaBowl XXII, 59–56, capturing their first ArenaBowl championship.
- On August 26, 2016, the Soul defeated the Arizona Rattlers in ArenaBowl XXIX, 56-42, to win their second championship in franchise history after two previous unsuccessful attempts against the Rattlers. Their final regular-season home game and two playoff games were moved to the PPL Center in nearby Allentown, Pennsylvania, as the Wells Fargo Center hosted the Democratic National Convention weeks earlier.
- On Saturday, August 26, 2017, the Soul won their third AFL title by defeating the Tampa Bay Storm in ArenaBowl XXX, 44–40 at Wells Fargo Center, to win back-to back AFL championships.

== Rivalries ==
=== Power ===
The Soul and Pittsburgh Power were both located in Pennsylvania. The Power began play in 2011, and both the Power and Soul were placed in the now-defunct East Division. As members of the East Division, the Soul and Power met twice a year, with each team hosting one home game. The series was tied 4–4 by the end of the 2014 season. The Power franchise folded in the 2014-15 off season due to poor attendance numbers, and many of the Power's key franchise players signed with the Soul when Pittsburgh folded.

=== Desperados ===
The Dallas Desperados were one of the Soul's biggest rivals. This rivalry originally spurred from the rivalry of the NFL's Philadelphia Eagles and the Dallas Cowboys, but made its way indoors with the Soul and Desperados battling for Eastern Division titles. The Soul lost the first game in this rivalry 51–47 on February 15, 2004. The all-time series ended tied at 5–5 at the demise of the Desperados franchise.

=== Gladiators ===
Though originally not as important as the rivalries with the Power and Desperados, the Cleveland Gladiators would soon become the Soul's biggest rival. The rivalry started in 2008 when the Gladiators moved from Las Vegas to Cleveland, moving them into the same division as the Soul. In their first meeting, the Gladiators defeated the Soul 63–35. For the 2017 season, the AFL abolished the conferences, and the Soul and Gladiators played four games against one another, with Philadelphia winning all four. The Gladiators announced that they would not play the 2018 or 2019 seasons due to renovations on Quicken Loans Arena that required it to close during the basketball off-season.

=== Sharks ===
The rivalry between the Soul and the Jacksonville Sharks truly began in 2012, the Sharks' defending ArenaBowl championship season and just their second year in the league. Philadelphia hosted the defending champions in the American Conference championship, which the Soul ran away with 89–34 to advance to the ArenaBowl. The following season, the Sharks would finish with the highest record in the conference and would host the Soul in the conference championship, which the Soul would win again, this time 75–59. In the 2015 off season, Soul legends Derrick Ross, Tiger Jones and Jason Holman left the Soul and signed with Jacksonville, and when the Sharks returned to Philadelphia for their third conference championship match up in four seasons, Jacksonville finally overcame the Soul 61–56 to advance to the ArenaBowl. In the 2016 AFL playoffs, the Soul got revenge, defeating the Sharks in the American Conference Championship game, advancing to ArenaBowl XXIX. The Jacksonville Sharks left the AFL for the National Arena League after the 2016 season, ending the Soul-Sharks rivalry.

=== Rattlers ===
Their biggest rival would become the Arizona Rattlers. The two teams faced off in back-to-back ArenaBowls in 2012 and 2013. The Rattlers would win both games. The Soul would finally beat the Rattlers in ArenaBowl XXIX in 2016. Following that season, the Rattlers moved to the Indoor Football League, ending the rivalry.

=== Popular culture ===
The Soul logo appeared on a 2008 episode of It's Always Sunny in Philadelphia entitled "Dennis Reynolds: An Erotic Life". Actress Lisa LoCicero played the role of a "representative" of the team.

Ashton Kutcher's character, Colt Bennett, wore a Soul T-shirt in season 1 episode 4 of The Ranch.

On a Season 5 punishment of Impractical Jokers, Joe Gatto has to shoot his own clothes into the crowd at a Soul game.

== Logo and uniforms ==
The Soul logo is a music note with a white football inside. Their original home jersey was a dark grey, and the road jersey was white. After experimenting with white and silver helmets during the 2004 Preseason, they adopted a dark grey helmet. In 2008, they introduced a blue alternate jersey, with "PHL" on the chest, and grey pants. The blue jersey was worn throughout the entire 2008 playoffs, including ArenaBowl XXII. However, the blue jerseys were not retained when the Soul returned in 2011. On March 13, 2012, the Soul unveiled a modified version of their blue jerseys to become their new home jerseys and matching white road jerseys, as well as a powder blue helmet for their road uniforms. For 2016 and 2017, they reverted to grey home jerseys. Prior to the start of the 2019 season, the AFL partnered with Phenom Elite to provide uniforms for the league. Their jerseys would be blue with an enlarged black logo across the chest and back.

== Notable players ==
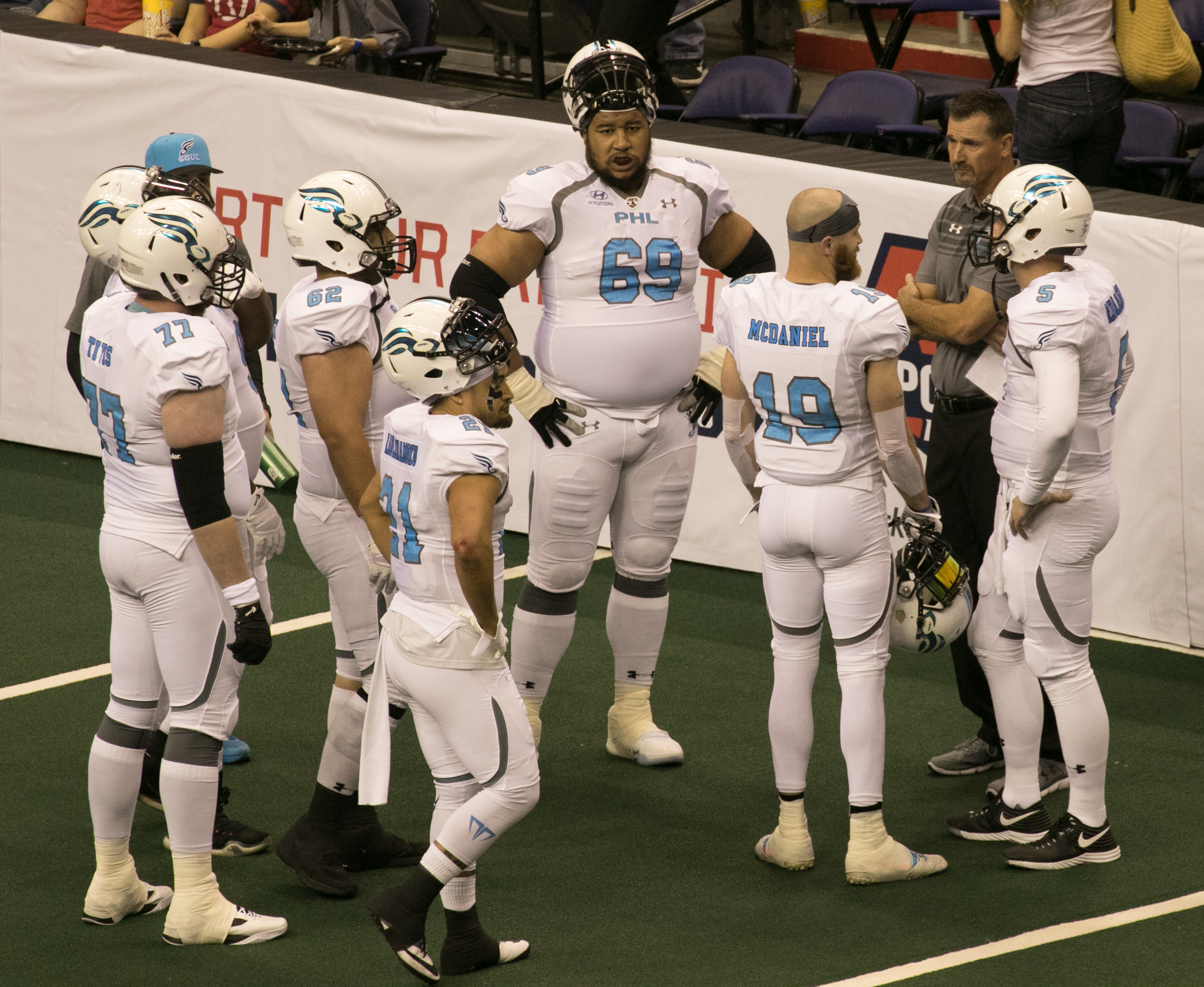
The Soul in 2017

=== Arena Football League Hall of Famers ===
Philadelphia Soul Hall of Famers
No.	Name	Year Inducted	Position(s)	Years w/ Soul
--	Clint Dolezel	2012	Head coach	2013–2019
--	Mike Hohensee	2012	Head coach	2011

=== Individual awards ===
Offensive Player of the Year
Season	Player	Position
2008	Chris Jackson	WR
2015	Dan Raudabaugh	QB

Quarterback of the Year
Season	Player	Position
2008	Matt D'Orazio	QB

Al Lucas Hero Award
Season	Player	Position
2008	Mike Brown	DB

ArenaBowl MVP
ArenaBowl	Player	Position
XXII	Matt D'Orazio	QB

Ironman of the Year Award
Season	Player	Position
2012	Jeff Hughley	WR/KR

Defensive Back of the Year
Season	Player	Position
2012	Kent Richardson	DB
2017	Dwayne Hollis	DB
2019	James Romain	DB

Offensive Lineman of the Year
Year	Player	Position
2015	Shannon Breen	OL
2017	Wayne Tribue	OL

AFL Most Valuable Player
Year	Player	Position
2015	Dan Raudabaugh	QB

Kicker of the Year
Year	Player	Position
2015	Tommy Frevert	K
2016	Tommy Frevert	K
2017	Adrian Trevino	K

Defensive Lineman of the Year
Year	Player	Position
2016	Jake Metz	DL

Defensive Player of the Year
Season	Player	Position
2016	Tracy Belton	DB
2017	Beau Bell	LB
2019	James Romain	DB

=== All-Arena players ===
The following Soul players have been named to All-Arena Teams:

- QB Matt D'Orazio (1), Dan Raudabaugh (2)
- FB Derrick Ross (3), Tommy Taggart (1), Jeramie Richardson (1)
- WR Chris Jackson (1), Donovan Morgan (1), Tiger Jones (2), Marco Thomas (1)
- OL/DL Ernest Allen (1)
- OL Phil Bogle (2), Mike Mabry (1), Martin Bibla (1), Brennen Carvalho (1), Christian Johnson (1), Wayne Tribue (1), Shannon Breen (1), Adam Smith (2), Neal Tivis (1)
- DL Bryan Save (1), Gabe Nyenhuis (1), Bryan Robinson (3), Ted Jennings (2), Jake Metz (1)
- LB Joe Goosby (1)
- DB Eddie Moten (2), Kent Richardson (1), Rayshaun Kizer (2), James Romain (1), Tracy Belton (1), Dwayne Hollis (1)
- DS Eddie Moten (1)
- K Carlos Martinez (1), Tommy Frevert (2)

=== All-Ironman players ===
The following Soul players have been named to All-Ironman Teams:

- FB/LB Idris Price (1), Clifton Smith (1)
- WR/DB Mike Brown (1)
- WR/KR Jeff Hughley (1)

=== All-Rookie players ===
The following Soul players have been named to All-Rookie Teams:

- OL Phil Bogle, Martin Bibla
- DL Bryan Save
- K Todd France, Connor Hughes

== Coaches and personnel ==
=== Head coaches ===
Note: Statistics are correct through the 2019 Arena Football League season.

Name	Term	Regular season			Playoffs			Awards
Name	Term	W	L	Win%	W	L	Win%	Awards
Michael Trigg	2004–2005	7	14	.333	0	0	–	
James Fuller	2005	4	7	.364	0	0	–	
Bret Munsey	2006–2008	30	18	.625	5	2	.714	
Mike Hohensee	2011	6	12	.333	0	0	–	
Doug Plank	2012	15	3	.833	2	1	.667	
Clint Dolezel	2013–2019	76	32	.704	10	6	.625	Coach of the Year (2015, 2016)

=== Staff ===
Philadelphia Soul staff
Front office: Majority owner – Craig A. Spencer; Majority owner – Ron Jaworski; Ownership group – Pete Ciarrocchi; Ownership group – Cosmo DeNicola; Ownership group – Martin E. Judge; Ownership Group - Marques Colston; Ownership Group - Dick Vermeil; Ownership Group - Nicholas Giuffre; Ownership Group - Jahri Evans; Ownership Group - Philip Jaurigue; Ownership Group - Stewart Anmuth; Ownership Group - Gil Peter; Ownership Group - Hal Brunson; Team president – John Adams; General manager – Phil Bogle; CIO – Greg Strickland	Coaches: Head coach – Clint Dolezel; Assistant head coach/linemen – Phil Bogle; Assistant offensive coach – Steve Criswell; Defensive backs coach – Bernie Nowotarski

== Season-by-season records ==
ArenaBowl champions	ArenaBowl appearance	Division champions	Playoff berth

Season	League	Conference	Division	Regular season			Postseason results
Season	League	Conference	Division	Finish	Wins	Losses	Postseason results
Philadelphia Soul
2004	AFL	National	Eastern	5th	5	11	
2005	AFL	National	Eastern	4th	6	10	
2006	AFL	National	Eastern	3rd	9	7	Won Wild Card Round (Austin) 52–35; Lost Divisional Round (Orlando) 31–27
2007	AFL	National	Eastern	2nd	8	8	Won Wild Card Round (Orlando) 41–26; Lost Divisional Round (Georgia) 65–39
2008	AFL	National	Eastern	1st	13	3	Won Divisional Round (New York) 49–48; Won Conference Championship (Cleveland) 70–35; Won ArenaBowl XXII (San Jose) 59–56
2009	The AFL suspended operations for the 2009 season.						
2010	Did not play in 2010.						
2011	AFL	American	East	4th	6	12	
2012	AFL	American	East	1st	15	3	Won Conference Semifinals (New Orleans) 66–53; Won Conference Championship (Jacksonville) 89–34; Lost ArenaBowl XXV (Arizona) 72–54
2013	AFL	American	East	1st	12	6	Won Conference Semifinals (Orlando) 59–55; Won Conference Championship (Jacksonville) 75–59; Lost ArenaBowl XXVI (Arizona) 48–39
2014	AFL	American	East	3rd	9	9	Lost Conference Semifinals (Cleveland) 39–37
2015	AFL	American	East	1st	15	3	Won Conference Semifinals (Cleveland) 47–35; Lost Conference Championship (Jacksonville) 61–56
2016	AFL	American	—	1st	13	3	Won Conference Semifinals (Tampa Bay) 63–41; Won Conference Championship (Jacksonville) 55–50; Won ArenaBowl XXIX (Arizona) 56–42
2017	AFL	—	—	1st	13	1	Won Semifinals (Baltimore) 69–54; Won ArenaBowl XXX (Tampa Bay) 44–40
2018	AFL	—	—	3rd	7	5	Lost in Playoffs (Baltimore)
2019	AFL	—	—	3rd	7	5	Won semifinals (Baltimore); Lost ArenaBowl XXXII (Albany) 45–27
Total					138	86	(includes only regular season)
Total					17	9	(includes only the postseason)
Total					155	95	(includes both regular season and postseason)

== See also ==
- Sports in Philadelphia
- Pennsylvania Sports Hall of Fame
