= Donald Chumley =

American football player (born 1962)

Profile
- Position: Defensive tackle

Personal information
- Born: March 14, 1962 (age 64); Hamburg, West Germany
- Listed height: 6 ft 4 in (1.93 m)
- Listed weight: 265 lb (120 kg)

Career information
- High school: Groves (Garden City, Georgia, U.S.)
- College: Georgia
- NFL draft: 1985: 12th round, 336th overall pick

Career history

Playing
- 1985: San Francisco 49ers*
- 1985: Calgary Stampeders
- * Offseason or practice squad member only

Coaching
- 2005–2016: Savannah Christian Raiders (HC)

Donald Chumley (born March 14, 1962) is a former American football defensive tackle who played one season with the Calgary Stampeders of the Canadian Football League (CFL). He was selected by the San Francisco 49ers of the National Football League (NFL) in the 12th round of the 1985 NFL draft. He played college football at the University of Georgia and attended Groves High School in Garden City, Georgia.

== Professional career ==
Chumley was selected by the San Francisco 49ers of the NFL with the final pick in the 1985 NFL Draft, earning him the title of Mr. Irrelevant. He signed with the CFL's Calgary Stampeders in September 1985 after being released by the 49ers.

== Coaching career ==
Chumley became head coach of the Savannah Christian Raiders of Savannah, Georgia in 2005. He left after the 2016 season.
