= Andrew Hawkins =

American football player (born 1986)

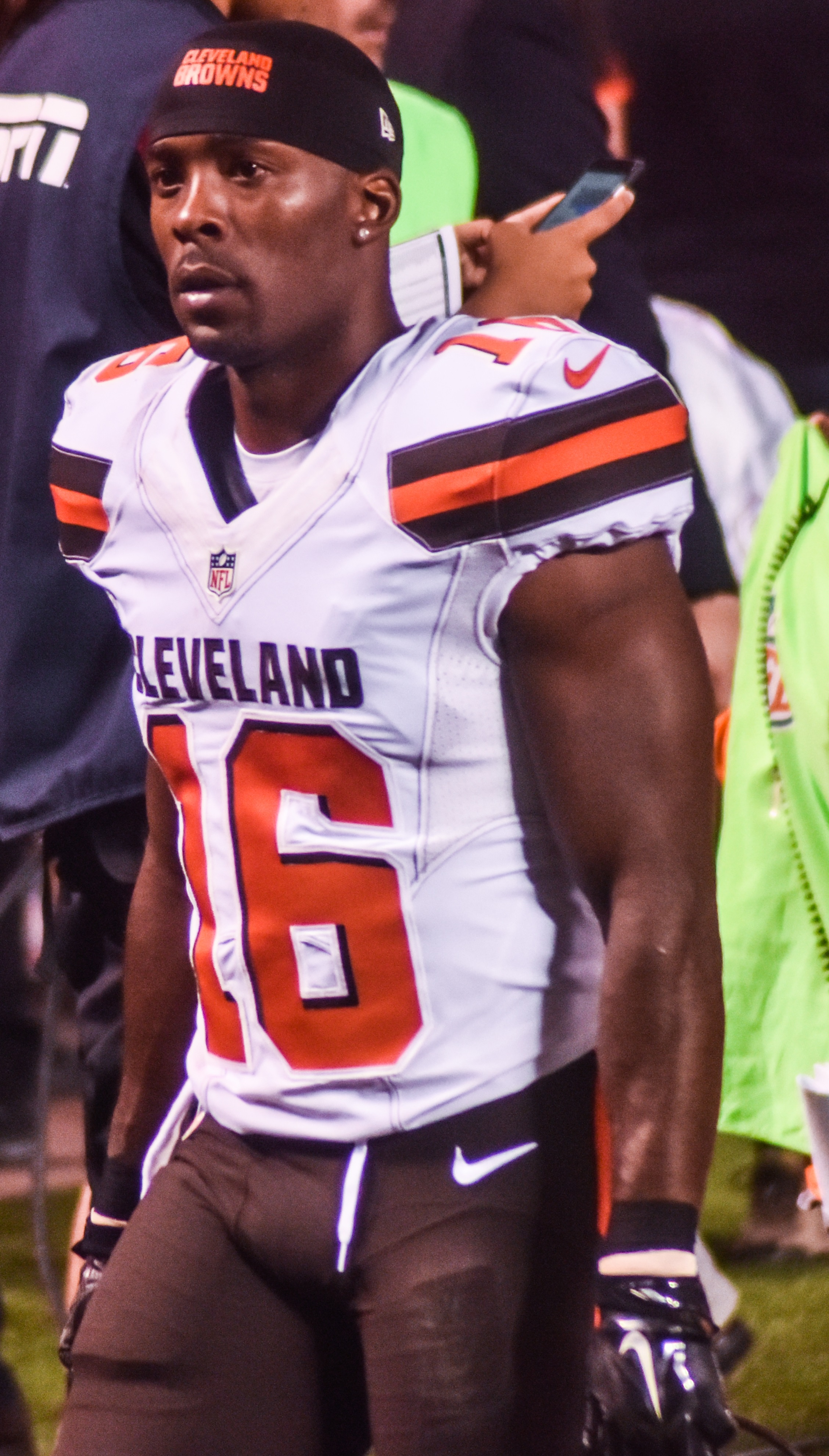
- Hawkins with the Cleveland Browns in 2015

No. 16, 19
- Position: Wide receiver

Personal information
- Born: March 10, 1986 (age 40); Johnstown, Pennsylvania, U.S.
- Listed height: 5 ft 7 in (1.70 m)
- Listed weight: 180 lb (82 kg)

Career information
- High school: Bishop McCort (Johnstown)
- College: Toledo (2004–2007)
- NFL draft: 2008: undrafted

Career history
- Montreal Alouettes (2009–2010); St. Louis Rams (2011)*; Cincinnati Bengals (2011–2013); Cleveland Browns (2014–2016); New England Patriots (2017)*
- * Offseason or practice squad member only

Awards and highlights
- 2× Grey Cup champion (2009, 2010)

Career NFL statistics
- Receptions: 209
- Receiving yards: 2,419
- Receiving touchdowns: 9
- Stats at Pro Football Reference

Career CFL statistics
- Receptions: 41
- Receiving yards: 457
- Receiving touchdowns: 5
- Stats at CFL.ca (archived)

Andrew Austin Wyatt Hawkins (born March 10, 1986) is an American former professional football player who was a wide receiver in the National Football League (NFL) and Canadian Football League (CFL). He played six seasons in the NFL with the Cincinnati Bengals and Cleveland Browns and two seasons for the Montreal Alouettes in the CFL, where he was part of back-to-back Grey Cup Championships. He had signed with the New England Patriots in the 2017 offseason, but announced his retirement just days before training camp. He played college football for the Toledo Rockets from 2004 to 2007.

== Early life ==
Hawkins attended Bishop McCort High School in his hometown of Johnstown, Pennsylvania, where he played football and ran track. In football, he played as a running back and had 562 yards rushing and 10 touchdowns as a senior. He was named second-team All-state as a defensive back by PA Football News and Associated Press, and All-conference as a running back. In track & field, Hawkins competed in sprinting and jumping events. In sprints, he recorded a personal-best time of 11.33 seconds in the 100 meters, and was a member of the 4 × 100 m relay squad. He also participated in long jump (20 ft 2 in) and triple jump (41 ft 8 in).

== College career ==
Hawkins chose to attend college at the University of Toledo in Toledo, Ohio. He played at wide receiver and cornerback, making him the first Rocket to play both ways in 48 years. Over four seasons, he played in 37 games, starting in 25. He finished his career with 67 receptions for 1,107 yards and five touchdowns. As a cornerback, he had two forced fumbles, one blocked punt and 21 tackles.

== Professional career ==
Pre-draft measurables
Height	Weight	Arm length	Hand span	40-yard dash	10-yard split	20-yard split	20-yard shuttle	Three-cone drill	Vertical jump	Broad jump	Bench press
5 ft 7 3/8 in (1.71 m)	182 lb (83 kg)	32 7/8 in (0.84 m)	9 1/4 in (0.23 m)	4.34 s	1.53 s	2.52 s	4.03 s	6.81 s	38.0 in (0.97 m)	9 ft 6 in (2.90 m)	9 reps
All values from Toledo Pro Day

Hawkins worked out with the Cleveland Browns after going undrafted in the 2008 NFL draft. He was not signed to play in the NFL and was out of football the entire 2008 season.

=== Montreal Alouettes ===
He then signed with the Montreal Alouettes of the Canadian Football League (CFL) on December 5, 2008.

However, before his first CFL season in 2009, Hawkins went to compete on Michael Irvin's football reality show 4th and Long to compete for a spot on the Dallas Cowboys roster. He was named the runner-up to fellow receiver Jesse Holley. Hawkins was cut on the final episode along with future CFL player Ahmaad Smith.

Hawkins then went on to play with the Alouettes for two seasons. He scored his first CFL touchdown on October 12, 2009, during a Thanksgiving Day match-up against the Calgary Stampeders. He totaled only 41 receptions, 457 yards and five touchdowns in two seasons for the Alouettes, but was a part of the back-to-back Grey Cup championship teams.

=== St. Louis Rams ===
On January 12, 2011, Hawkins signed a contract with the St. Louis Rams of the National Football League (NFL). He was waived by St. Louis on August 1.

=== Cincinnati Bengals ===
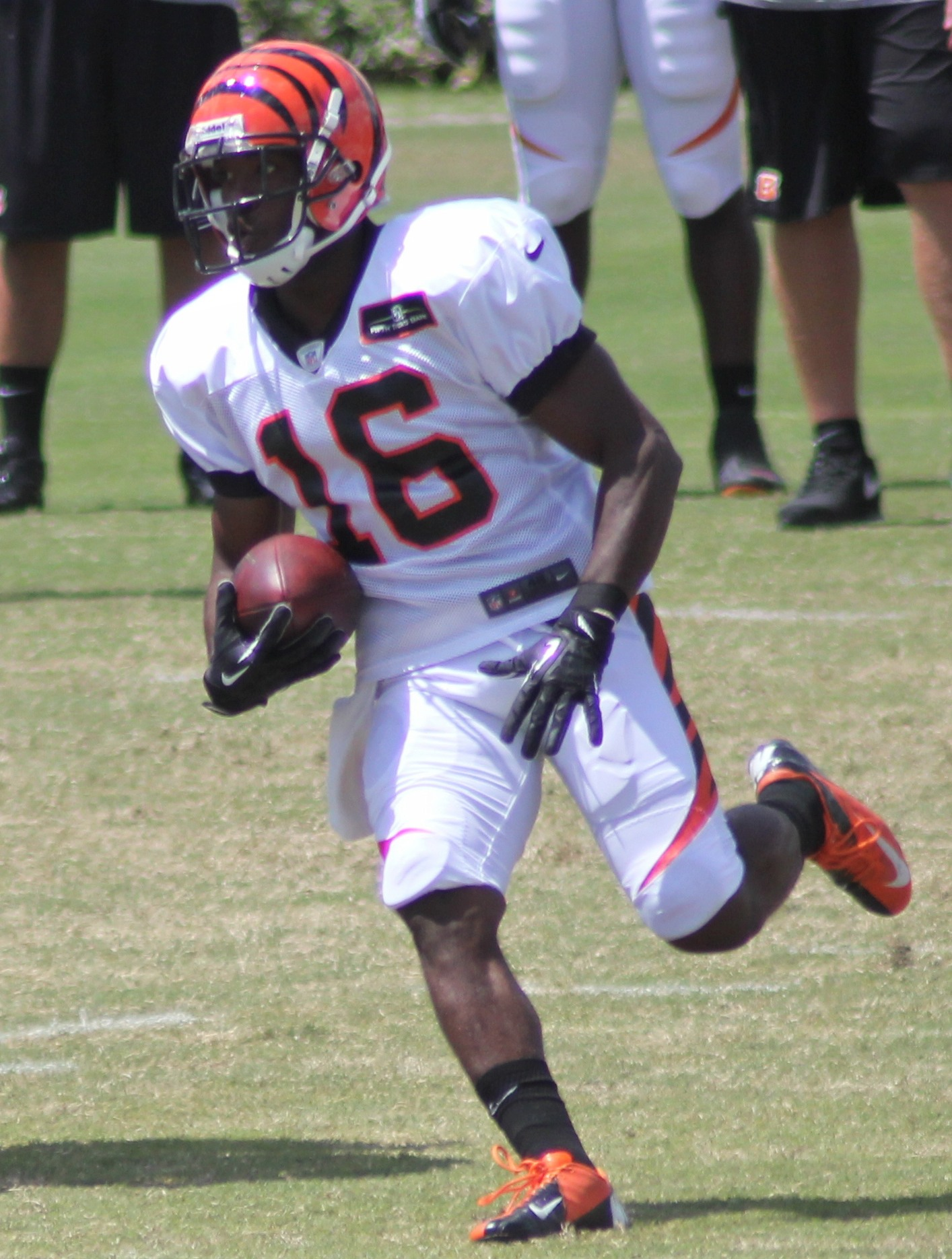
Hawkins at Bengals training camp in 2013

The Cincinnati Bengals claimed Hawkins off waivers on August 1, 2011. He debuted for the team on August 21, in Week 2 of the preseason against New York Jets, catching a 15-yard pass from Dan LeFevour. Hawkins was waived during final-day cuts on September 3, but he was re-signed to the team's practice squad the following day. Hawkins was added to the active roster after Jordan Shipley was placed on injured reserve.

Hawkins went on to record 23 receptions for 263 yards, both fifth among the team's receivers. He also had five rushes for 25 yards converted on nine third-down situations. His on-the-field performance made Hawkins a bit of a "fan favorite" among Bengals fans, who referred to him as "Baby Hawk".

He had a breakout season in 2012 for the Bengals, playing in 14 games and totaling 51 receptions for 533 yards and four touchdowns, plus six rushes for 30 yards.

In 2013, Hawkins suffered a serious ankle injury prior to the preseason and was placed on injured reserve with a designation for a possible return, meaning he could return and play by Week 9. He did return and played in the Bengals final eight games, totaling 12 receptions for 199 yards.

=== Cleveland Browns ===
Hawkins signed an offer sheet with the Cleveland Browns on March 12, 2014. The Bengals had until March 18 to match or the offer sheet would become an official contract. The Bengals declined to match the offer, and Hawkins became a member of the Browns with a reported four-year, $13.6 million contract, including a $3.8 million signing bonus. In his first season in Cleveland, Hawkins led the Browns with 63 catches for 824 yards and two touchdowns. On December 23, 2015, the Browns placed him on injured reserve.

On February 27, 2017, Hawkins was released by the Browns.

=== New England Patriots ===
On May 24, 2017, Hawkins signed a one-year contract with the New England Patriots. On July 25, just two months after signing with the Patriots, Hawkins announced his retirement from the NFL.

== Statistics ==
=== NFL ===
Season	Team	Receiving							Rushing					Fumbles	
Season	Team	GP	Rec	Tgts	Yds	Avg	Lng	TD	Att	Yds	Avg	Lng	TD	Fum	Lost
2011	CIN	13	23	34	263	11.4	26	0	5	25	5.0	8	0	0	0
2012	CIN	14	51	80	533	10.5	59	4	6	30	5.0	11	0	1	0
2013	CIN	8	12	18	199	16.6	50	0	2	3	1.5	6	0	1	0
2014	CLE	15	63	113	824	12.9	65	2	1	8	8.0	8	0	0	0
2015	CLE	8	27	44	276	10.2	25	0	0	0	0.0	0	0	1	1
2016	CLE	16	33	54	324	9.8	33	3	2	0	0.0	1	0	1	1
Total		59	209	343	2,419	11.6	65	9	18	73	4.1	11	0	4	2

all stats from espn.com

=== CFL ===
Season	Team	Receiving					Rushing				
Season	Team	Rec	Yds	Avg	Lng	TD	Att	Yds	Avg	Lng	TD
2009	MTL	13	131	10.1	19	3	1	5	5.0	5	0
2010	MTL	28	326	11.6	45	2	4	52	13.0	15	0
	Total	41	457	11.1	45	5	5	57	11.4	15	0

== Personal life ==
Hawkins is the younger brother of former NFL cornerback Artrell Hawkins. He is also the cousin of retired CFL slotback Geroy Simon, and former NFL offensive guard Carlton Haselrig.

Hawkins is a Christian. Hawkins has spoken about his faith saying, "I literally thank God every day for what I'm doing right now. I wouldn't change the way I got here at all. It taught me so much. It made me a better person and a better man. I'm just so thankful for where I am, and I wake up every day and thank God for it."

Hawkins graduated from Columbia University in 2017 with a master's degree in sports management from the School of Professional Studies with a 4.0 GPA.

== Film and television career ==
Hawkins appears as an extra in the George Clooney film, The Ides of March.

Hawkins is now a host on SportsCenter on Snapchat. In addition to this Hawkins co-hosts a football based podcast called the Thom & Hawk Football Show with his former teammate from the Browns, Joe Thomas.

Hawkins hosts Discovery Channel's reality competition TV show Dodgeball Thunderdome along with YouTube star David Dobrik and Erin Lim.

Hawkins cohosts variety program "Roku Recommends" with actress Maria Menounos which premiered July 2021
