= Preston McGann =

American football player

No. 26, 83
- Position: Wide receiver

Personal information
- Listed height: 6 ft 3 in (1.91 m)
- Listed weight: 205 lb (93 kg)

Career information
- High school: Groves (Garden City, Georgia)
- College: Seminole State (FL)

Career history
- Orlando Rage (2006–2009); Columbus Lions (2009–2010); Orlando Rage (2011–2015?); Pittsburgh Power (2012)

Career AFL statistics
- Receptions: 1
- Receiving yards: 6
- Tackles: 2
- Stats at ArenaFan.com

Preston McGann is an American former football wide receiver. He played college baseball at Seminole Community College. He was a member of the Orlando Rage, Columbus Lions, and Pittsburgh Power. McGann appeared on Michael Irvin's reality show 4th and Long.

== Early life ==
McGann played high school baseball at Groves High School in Garden City, Georgia. He did not play football in high school.

== College career ==
McGann played college baseball for the Seminole Community College Raiders from 2005 to 2006.

== Professional career ==
McGann played for the semi-pro Orlando Rage from 2006 to 2009, earning 2008 Southern States Football MVP honors as the team won two league championships.

McGann was the second cut on Michael Irvin's reality show 4th and Long.

McGann signed with the Columbus Lions of the Southern Indoor Football League in December 2009 and played for the team during the 2010 season.

McGann returned to the Rage, earning FFA All Star honors in 2011 after recording 31 receptions for 720 yards and 11 touchdowns during the regular season. He has played for the Rage each season since 2011.

McGann played in two games for the Pittsburgh Power in 2012, recording a reception and two tackles. He joined the Power for the first game of the 2012 season due to some of the regular players holding out due to disagreements between the AFL and the AFL Players' Union. In a game between the Power and the Orlando Predators, several former and current Orlando Rage players, including McGann, were assigned to either the Power or the Predators during an impromptu draft.
