= Ahmaad =

Ahmaad is a given name. Notable people with the name include:

- Ahmaad Galloway (1980–2023), American football player
- Ahmaad Moses (born 2004), American football player
- Ahmaad Rorie (born 1996), American basketball player
- Ahmaad Smith (born 1983), American football player

== See also ==
- Ahmad
