= Groves High School (Georgia) =

Public school in Georgia, United States

Robert W. Groves High School
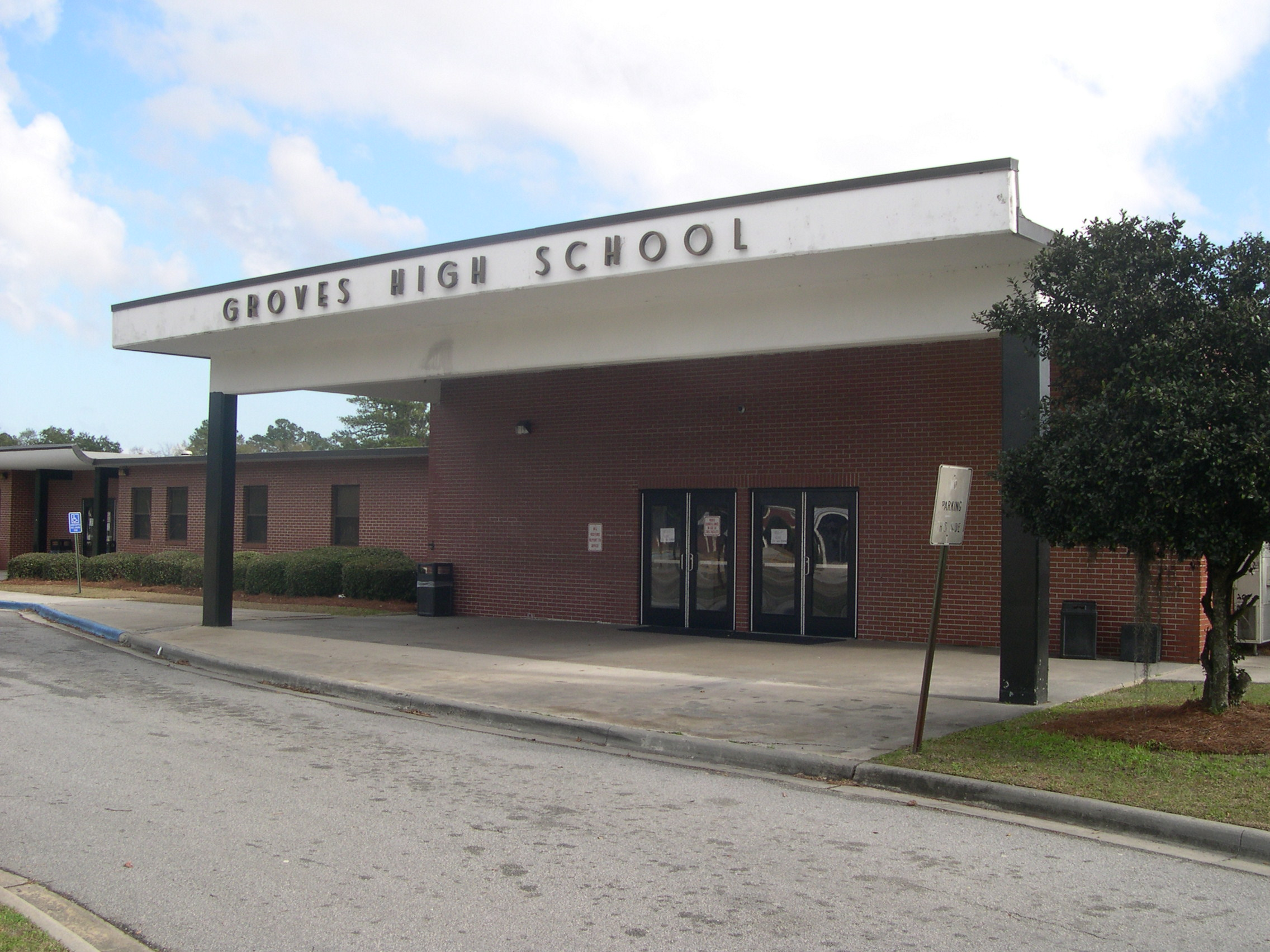
- The main entrance of Robert W. Groves High School

Location
- 100 Priscilla D Thomas Way; Garden City, Georgia 31408; United States; 32°6′24″N 81°9′25″W

Information
- Type: Public secondary school
- Established: 1958 (68 years ago)
- School district: Savannah-Chatham County Public Schools
- CEEB code: 112680
- Principal: Dr. Monique Hazzard-Robinson
- Staff: 68.30 (FTE)
- Grades: 9–12
- Enrollment: 1,064 (2023-2024)
- Student to teacher ratio: 15.58
- Colors: Black and gold
- Mascot: Rebels
- Website: groves.sccpss.com

Robert W. Groves High School (also known as Groves High School or GHS) is a public secondary school located in Garden City, Georgia, United States, serving students in grades 9–12. The school is part of Savannah-Chatham County Public Schools, with admission based primarily on the locations of students' homes.

== History ==
Groves High School was founded in 1958. Established to serve the young people and families of West Chatham County, the school is named for Robert W. Groves, a business and civic leader in the county. Besides his roles in business, commerce, and the community, Groves was concerned with the youth of the area and their educational needs. To that end, he was a supporter, both financially and morally, for programs at the school.

As of August 13, 2020, the school is being demolished to make way for a new institution accommodating grades K-12.

== Notable alumni ==
- Donald Chumley, football player
- James "Ron" Helmly, retired U.S. Army lieutenant general
- Preston McGann, football player
