= Donte Gamble =

American gridiron football player (born 1978)

No. 15
- Position: Defensive back

Personal information
- Born: July 14, 1978 (age 48); Los Angeles, California, U.S.
- Listed height: 5 ft 7 in (1.70 m)
- Listed weight: 165 lb (75 kg)

Career information
- High school: Centennial (Compton, California)
- College: San Diego State
- NFL draft: 2002: undrafted

Career history
- 2002: Calgary Stampeders*
- 2002: Peoria Pirates
- 2002: Ottawa Renegades
- 2004: Sioux City Bandits
- * Offseason or practice squad member only

Donte Kavon Gamble (born July 14, 1978) is an American former professional football defensive back who played one season with the Ottawa Renegades of the Canadian Football League (CFL). He played college football at El Camino Junior College and San Diego State University. Gamble was also a member of the Calgary Stampeders, Peoria Pirates, and Sioux City Bandits. He appeared on Michael Irvin's reality show 4th and Long.

== Early life ==
Gamble was a two-year letterman in football at Centennial High School in Compton, California. He earned first team all-conference honors at cornerback and punt returner. He led the league in punt-return yardage and won the team's big hitter award. Gamble also lettered in basketball for the Apaches.

== College career ==
Gamble was a two-year starter for the El Camino Junior College Warriors. He twice garnered first team all-Mission Conference recognition as a corner and punt returner. He also earned coaches first-team all-state honors his sophomore year.

Gamble transferred to play for the San Diego State Aztecs from 2000 to 2001. He played in nine games, starting six, in 2000 before being slowed down due to a knee injury. He recorded 28 total tackles, two interceptions, six pass break-ups and two forced fumbles during the 2000 season. Gamble played in eleven games in 2001, accumulating 29 kick returns and 27 punt returns.

== Professional career ==
Gamble spent the 2002 off-season with the Calgary Stampeders of the CFL and was released by the team on June 15, 2002. He played for the Peoria Pirates of the af2 in 2002. He played in eight games for the Ottawa Renegades of the CFL during the 2002 season. Gamble was signed by the Sioux City Bandits of the National Indoor Football League on March 22, 2004 and played for the team during the 2004 season. He also played in the LCFL. He was the sixth cut on Michael Irvin's reality show 4th and Long.

== Personal life ==
Gamble has worked with mentally challenged adults in helping them feel comfortable being a part of the workforce. He has also coached youth football.
