= 4th and Long =

- Created by: Michael Irvin
- Presented by: Michael Irvin; Joe Avezzano; Bill Bates
- Country of origin: United States
- Original language: English
- No. of episodes: 10

Production
- Executive producers: J. D. Roth; Todd Nelson
- Running time: 60 minutes (including commercials)

Original release
- Network: Spike
- Release: May 18 – July 20, 2009

4th and Long is an American reality television series hosted by Michael Irvin that premiered on Spike on May 18, 2009. The winner of the show earned a spot at the Dallas Cowboys training camp, with a shot of making the roster. The show puts six wide receivers against six defensive backs. The show was filmed at the Cotton Bowl, with Joe Avezzano as the coach for the receivers and Bill Bates as the coach for the backs.

The athletes have varying backgrounds, including national champions, CFL players, arena league veterans, semi-pro players, and those who have tried to make NFL rosters.

== Contestants ==
Position	Name	Jersey number	Age	Height	Weight	College	Result
WR	Jesse Holley	83	25	6'3	216	North Carolina	Winner in Episode 10
WR	Andrew Hawkins	82	22	5'7	175	Toledo	Runners Up in Episode 10
DB	Ahmaad Smith	25	25	6'0	196	Tennessee State	Runners Up in Episode 10
DB	Eddie Moten	24	27	5'10	185	Texas A&M–Kingsville	Runners Up in Episode 10
DB	Moses Washington	26	28	6'0	164	Oklahoma	Cut in Episode 9
WR	Montrell Jones	84	27	6'2	205	Tennessee/Louisville	Cut in Episode 8
DB	Donte Gamble	22	30	5'8	165	San Diego State	Cut in Episode 7
WR	Steve Gonzalez	81	24	6'2	205	Menlo College	Cut in Episode 5
WR	Luke Swan	86	24	6'0	193	Wisconsin	Cut in Episode 4
DB	Erick Jackson	23	24	6'1	195	Texas	Cut in Episode 3
WR	Preston McGann	85	25	6'3	203	Seminole Community College	Cut in Episode 2
DB	Stephen Andrews	21	25	5'9	185	College of New Jersey	Cut in Episode 1

== Episode progress ==
Contestants	Episodes									
Contestants	1	2	3	4	5	6	7	8	9	10
Jesse Holley	SAFE	SAFE	SAFE	SAFE	SAFE	SAFE	BTM	SAFE	SAFE	WON
Andrew Hawkins	SAFE	SAFE	SAFE	SAFE	SAFE	SAFE	BTM	SAFE	SAFE	CUT
Ahmaad Smith	SAFE	SAFE	SAFE	SAFE	BTM 2	SAFE	BTM	SAFE	SAFE	CUT
Eddie Moten	SAFE	SAFE	SAFE	SAFE	SAFE	SAFE	BTM	SAFE	BTM 2	CUT
Moses Washington	SAFE	SAFE	BTM 3	SAFE	SAFE	SAFE	BTM	BTM 2	CUT	
Montrell Jones	BTM 3	BTM 2	SAFE	SAFE	SAFE	SAFE	BTM	CUT		
Donte Gamble	SAFE	SAFE	SAFE	BTM 2	SAFE	SAFE	CUT			
Steve Gonzalez	BTM 2	BTM 3	SAFE	SAFE	CUT					
Luke Swan	SAFE	SAFE	BTM 3	CUT						
Erick Jackson	SAFE	SAFE	CUT							
Preston McGann	SAFE	CUT								
Stephen Andrews	CUT									

The contestant won the competition.
The contestant was summoned to the war room.
The contestant was cut.
The contestant was cut immediately after a drill or practice
The contestant performed the best or won the challenge therefore winning the reward.
The contestant performed the best or won the challenge therefore winning the reward but was still called into the war room.

- In episode 6, all of the remaining players were safe.
- In episode 7, all of the eliminated players returned to compete for one of the remaining player's jersey.

== Episodes ==
=== 4th Quarter Training ===
First aired May 18, 2009 Three of the twelve players were called into the coaches room and given one last chance to explain why they should stay. After careful consideration, Irvin sends Andrews home. Irvin tells Andrews that he is cut and could still play in the NFL, just not for Dallas. Before Steve Gonzalez leaves the roombox, Irvin pulls out a sports bag of jerseys and gives one to Gonzalez and then gives the bag to him to give to the rest.

- Bottom 3: Stephen Andrews, Steve Gonzalez, Montrell Jones
- Bottom 2: Stephen Andrews, Steve Gonzalez
- Cut: Stephen Andrews for his poor showing in the punt return drill.

=== Within Your Grasp ===
First aired May 25, 2009

While in the war room, Irvin and the other coaches tell the three players why they are here and let them have one last chance to redeem themselves. Irvin tells Steve he is safe and lets him continue in the competition. The final two are then lectured by the three coaches, Irvin then tells McGann he could still play in the NFL, just not for Dallas. Preston leaves the room and writes a note to the remaining cast members. Irvin pulls out a set of playbooks and gives one to Jones then tells Jones not to lose it or he will be cut immediately. Jones agrees and then is given the rest of the playbooks to give to the team. Before Jones leaves the war room, Irvin tells him to tell the others not to lose their playbooks or they will be cut immediately as well as Jones for not stressing the importance of the book.

- Bottom 3: Preston McGann, Steve Gonzalez, Montrell Jones
- Bottom 2: Preston McGann, Montrell Jones
- Cut: Preston McGann for his perceived lack of interest in getting physical during the drills.

=== Game Day ===
First aired June 1, 2009

In a game with unnumbered players rounding out roster spots on two complete teams, the DB's take on the WR's to see who is better at their positions. In one play, Luke Swan (who is billed as "Prone To Injury") stretches to catch a touchdown pass and gets injured when one of the DB's lands on his legs as he hits the turf. As a result, he sufferes a groin injury that hampers his playing ability. His senior year of college play was cut short when he was tackled awkwardly and his hamstrings were torn from the leg bone, ending his season as he recuperated from surgery. One of the coaches questions whether the groin injury is as bad as Swan makes it out to be, or whether he is having "ghost pain" from his earlier hamstring trauma.

During the game, DB's Jackson and Smith are called into the bleachers by Michael Irvin to discuss their lack of aggressive play. One DB is pointed out for "opening the gate" and not jamming the receivers at the line of scrimmage; the other seems to be tentative in tackling larger fullbacks swinging out of the backfield.

Erick Jackson is criticized for his performance. Moses Washington is called in to warn him to practice his football skills. Luke Swan is called in to address his injury situation.

- Bottom 3: Erick Jackson, Luke Swan, Moses Washington
- Cut: Erick Jackson for his poor performance during the scrimmage game.

=== The Red Zone ===
First aired June 8, 2009

After being called into the War Room, Moses Washington asks Donte Gamble to help him with jamming receivers at the line and coverage on short yardage plays. Donte agrees and coaches Washington on his technique.

The players started the next practice with jump balls in the endzone, simulating a common Red Zone offensive play. Michael Irvin is assisted in his demonstrations and coaching by All-Pro Darren Woodson, who works with the DB's while Michael works with the WR's. The DB's dominated for most of the drills. Because of this, Michael Irvin awarded phone calls to whomever the players wanted, based on performance during the drill in an attempt to get the receivers to play harder.

The next drill was a 100-yard passing scrimmage in single-man (aka "one on one") defense, with only a quarterback and no linemen or running backs or safeties. Because the receivers had more room and the defensive backs had no help downfield, the receivers broke free and dominated. The defensive backs became noticeably winded from all the running. Donte Gamble got burned on a "hook and ladder" score at the end of the drill that Michael Irvin compared to a high school football play.

While this was going on, Luke Swan could not practice for the day due to his injury and spent the time warming up on the stationary bike under the watchful eye of the trainer, Hollie.

The next day they had morning practice and Luke Swan finally practiced but the trainer was not happy with the decision. She said he felt that he had something to prove, but the only thing he was proving was that he was injured. Luke ended up reinjuring himself in an agility drill against a defensive back.

Michael and the coaches reviewed the game tapes and deliberated about Swan's injury and whether his history of leg injuries would haunt him during a full NFL season, or whether they might be cutting a guy that could heal up and have a 15-year career. Donte Gamble was called into the War Room because of his losing sight of receivers during the one-on-one coverage drills and then getting badly beaten by the "hook and ladder" play because he didn't stay with his man. Luke Swan was called in to address his injury situation. Luke expressed regret that he ended his college career with a leg injury, and was now ending his shot at the NFL with another leg injury.

- Bottom 2: Luke Swan, Donte Gamble
- Cut: Luke Swan for his injuries being too consistent to have an NFL career

=== Halfway There ===
First aired June 15, 2009

The players are awakened in pre-dawn darkness and put on a bus to Irving, where they are each given a football and told to run the 8.5 miles back to the Cotton Bowl. The DB's win the contest and receive a DVD of their scrimmage game against the WR's as a reward.

The next drill is a form of "musical chairs" where the eight players go downfield as seven machines send simulated punts deep. The players have to catch a ball or get another player to fumble his ball, recover it, and bring it back to the end zone. The player who returns without a ball is out. After each elimination, one less ball is "punted".

Afterwards, there is a drill involving "yards after contact", where the WR's run a ten-yard crossing pattern and then have to go through the tackling DB to advance the ball ten yards at a time to score. Gamble is embarrassed when Gonzalez hurdles him. Smith gets beat several times by other WR's. The WR's march down the field before the DB's can stop them and send them back ten yards. The WR's score soon after.

During the call-back to determine who gets cut, WR Gonzalez says that performance on the field should determine whether he or DB Smith gets cut, so a new drill is run, in full pads, with the other players watching. The two players go "best 3 out of 5", with DB Smith defending against WR Gonzalez on simulated Red Zone plays. With each player earning two wins, the final play comes down to Gonzalez running a crossing pattern across the front of the end zone. Smith undercuts him at the turn and manages to break up the pass, sending Gonzalez home to his young family.

- Bottom 2: Steve Gonzalez, Ahmaad Smith
- Cut: Steve Gonzalez for losing the challenge drill against Smith.

=== Great Sacrifices, Great Rewards ===
First aired June 22, 2009

With 3 WRs and 4 DBs left, the coaches decide to do a kick-off return drill with each player having a chance to receive the ball while three other players try to tackle him. Included in the drill are three black-out players: the kicker (who is eligible to make tackles) and two blockers for the returner. After each candidate has had a chance to return a kick, one blocker is removed and each candidate gets another chance to score. Then, the last blocker is removed, so that it is just the returner and three opposing players (and the kicker). Andrew Hawkins is the only player return a kick for a touchdown, but a fumble is recovered by Montrell Jones on the kicking team and returned for a touchdown.

Afterwards, the candidates are given a chance to play twenty minutes of flag football, with the losing team cooking steaks, corn, and other food on a grill for the winning team.

Later that night, all of the candidates are shuttled in a limo to a club owned by one of the coaches, where they enjoy a good meal, music, and dancing with local women. After being kidded in the limo by the other players because he was the only one wearing a blazer and a tie, Moses Washington ended up meeting the most women (who complimented him on his style). Unbeknownst to the players, this was a test to see how well they could handle the glamour that goes along with being a player in the NFL.

When the players return to the Cotton Bowl, the DBs find that their belongings have been moved into the WRs common sleeping area, so that the WRs and DBs now share the same bedroom, except that there are 6 beds and 7 players, so 1 of them is forced to sleep on the couch in the living room, in which was Moses Washington.

The next morning, the players are put through a grueling series of drills, including running the stadium stairs, until at least one of them decides to quit and turn in his jersey. After 5 hours of physically demanding workouts, none of the players quit (although Montrell Jones did complain of a hamstring injury that was looked at by the trainers), so none of them were cut.

- Bottom 2: None
- Cut: None

=== The Rivals ===
First aired June 29, 2009

All seven remaining players – four DBs and three WRs – are called to the entrance of the Cotton Bowl where they are told that they will be faced with something they haven't had to face as a group yet; a rivalry game.

The five players that had already been cut are brought back as a team, coached by famous NFL All-Pro and Super Bowl champion wide receiver Jerry Rice. The players are told that if one of Rice's players outplays him, he could lose his jersey to the player, and that player (who had formerly been cut) would take his place in the competition. Swan states that his leg injury has been rehabilitated and he's ready to play at 100%.

Irvin says the average NFL play is 6 seconds. The total time of play in an average game is 24 seconds of intensity. The players are told that they will run head-to-head against Rice's players on a treadmill set at 20 mph to simulate constant play, and the first team to reach 12 minutes will get the right to receive the kick-off at the Rivalry Game. Rice's team wins, with several players on both teams vomiting on the ground and into garbage cans.

The Rivalry Game is played between Rice's team and Irvin's team, with AFL and semi-pro players filling the spots not assigned to the competing players. Rice's team takes an early lead, with Swan, McGann, and Gonzalez making big plays. Irvin's team scores on a touchdown catch by Holley. Rice's team gets the ball but Swan and Gonzalez suffer shoulder injuries and have to withdraw. The Irvin team wins on a fumble recovery for a touchdown.

After the game, all of the players are brought into the Film Room and shown clips of the game. McGann, Swan, Gamble, and Gonzalez are told to stay after the other players leave. Gonzalez and Swan are told that they have talent, but their injuries are too great and there isn't time left for them to heal, and they are dismissed. McGann is complimented on his improved play and terrific performance in the game (he scored a touchdown and gained more yardage than the other players), but is also dismissed. Gamble is complimented on his intelligence and ability to analyze a play as it is developing, but Irvin notes that Rice kept sending bigger WRs at Gamble to take advantage of the size difference, and says that the real NFL teams will do the same thing. Gamble is dismissed.

- Bottom: All 12 original competitors
- Cut: Donte Gamble for his inability to match up with bigger wide receivers, as shown during the rivalry game.

=== Moose Crossing ===
First aired July 6, 2009

In this episode, former Cowboys fullback, Daryl "Moose" Johnston, explains and demonstrates the first drill for the contestants. The drill is running a gauntlet. The goal is to catch fifty balls as fast as possible while running between two players with pads hitting them at the start and end of the course. Jesse Holley earned the best time. The last drill of the episode was "Control the Clock". The DB's wanted to break up passes, tackle a wide out in-bounds, or return an interception for a touchdown. The wide receivers wanted to get out of bounds in order to improve field position or score. The first team to five touchdowns would be declared the winner. The wide receivers won five to zero, with Hawkins and Holley scoring multiple times.

- Bottom 2: Montrell Jones and Moses Washington
- Cut: Montrell Jones for losing a one on one drill against Moses Washington

=== Beating the Blocker ===
First aired July 13, 2009

During a drill where each player had to beat two other players blocking in order to tackle the QB dummy, Washington got so beat up that he could hardly walk. Consequently, he lost the respect of the other players and Michael Irvin, who felt he lacked the physical toughness he expects from a Dallas Cowboy player.

- Bottom: Moses Washington and Eddie Moten
- Cut: Moses Washington

=== Amongst the Stars ===
First aired July 20, 2009

The drills for this episode were focused on special teams' play. Each player received a kick while the other players beat blockers to make the tackle. Hawkins impressed with his quickness and agility.

The final drill was a scrimmage game with black-out players, with the WRs playing against the DBs. The WRs took an early lead with two scores by Holley and one by Hawkins. The DBs were down with the clock winding down. Smith was told that he had to make something happen. On the final kick-off, Smith managed to get Hawkins to fumble the ball which was returned for a touchdown. The DBs assumed that since they won the game, they wouldn't get cut. However, Moten's unremarkable play, excuse-making, and lateness to practices caught up to him and he was sent home.

The remaining three players take a tour of the new Cowboys stadium and meet Jerry Jones, where Jones informs Holley that he has been accepted into the Dallas Cowboys training camp for the upcoming season.

- Winner: Jesse Holley
- Runner up: Ahmaad Smith and Andrew Hawkins
- Cut: Eddie Moten

== Notes ==
Jesse Holley: Member of 2004-05 national championship basketball team, failed tryout with Cincinnati Bengals in 2007 and BC Lions in 2008.

Andrew Hawkins: Tried out for Cleveland Browns in 2007 and was signed by Montreal Alouettes in 2008. His father (Artrell Hawkins Sr.), brother (Artrell Hawkins), and cousin (Carlton Haselrig) played in the NFL and one cousin (Geroy Simon) played in the CFL.

Ahmaad Smith: Played for semi-pro Mississippi Mudcats and tried out for BC Lions.

Eddie Moten: Four seasons with Philadelphia Soul. (AFL) (2005–2008)

Moses Washington: Also ran track at Oklahoma, member of 2000 national championship football team.

Montrell Jones: Played for Montreal Alouettes in 2007 and Columbus Destroyers in 2008.

Donte Gamble: Played for Sioux City Bandits.

Steve (Speedy) Gonzalez: Arena League veteran Manchester Wolves (AFL2) and Philadelphia Soul (AFL). Broke a number of Wolves records.

Luke Swan: Tried out for Kansas City Chiefs, injured in college.

Erick Jackson: Member of 2005 national championship football team

Preston McGann: Baseball player; did not play high school football.

Stephen Andrews: Tried out for CFL's BC Lions.

=== After the show ===
Jesse Holley was signed to the Dallas Cowboys. He made his debut for the team and the NFL against the Raiders in a preseason game and scored the game-winning touchdown on a punt return against the Vikings in the final preseason game. He was cut by the Cowboys to make room for other players for the 53-man roster limit, but was signed to the practice squad. However, on 10/15/2010 he was called up to the main 53 man roster as a special teams player. On Sept. 18th, 2011, Holley again found himself with the Cowboys being put into play after injuries limited the choices of wide receivers. He made his first regular season catches, including a 77-yard reception to the 1-yard line which set up a dramatic overtime win.

Andrew Hawkins, although a runner-up, went on to have the best career of any contestant on the show. On March 18, 2014, he signed a 13.6 million-dollar contract with the Cleveland Browns. Directly after the show, Hawkins went on to play two seasons for the CFL's Montreal Alouettes. After being a part of two back-to-back Grey Cup champions, Hawkins signed a two-year contract with the St. Louis Rams on January 13, 2011. After being placed on waivers by the Rams, he was claimed by the Cincinnati Bengals and was initially on the practice squad. He was activated to the 53-man roster on 9-20-11. Hawkins has become a fan favorite in Cincinnati, scoring touchdowns in Weeks 2 and 3 of the 2012–2013 NFL season, including a 59-yard game winner against the Washington Redskins in Week 3 on September 23. After four NFL seasons in both Cincinnati and Cleveland he has accumulated 149 receptions for 1,819 yards and 6 touchdowns. He is now one of the top 30 paid WRs in the NFL. Hawkins currently works as an NFL analyst at ESPN and one of the hosts of SportsCenter on Snapchat.

Eddie Moten was signed to the California Redwoods of the United Football League. In 2010, he was a member of the Dallas Vigilantes.

Montrell Jones was signed to the Spokane Shock of the af2.

Erick Jackson was signed to the Rio Grande Valley Dorados of the AF2.

Preston McGann played semi-professional football with the Orlando Rage (Southern States Football League) in 2009. He signed with Columbus Lions of the Southern Indoor Football League in December 2009.

Moses Washington is currently a Student Success Advocate at Broward College's South Campus, and is in charge of the Summer Learning Institute.
