= Eddie Moten =

American football player (born 1981)

Profile
- Position: Cornerback

Personal information
- Born: August 30, 1981 (age 45); Dallas, Texas, U.S.
- Listed height: 5 ft 10 in (1.78 m)
- Listed weight: 185 lb (84 kg)

Career information
- High school: Lancaster (Lancaster, Texas)
- College: Texas A&M–Kingsville
- NFL draft: 2004: undrafted

Career history
- Rio Grande Valley Dorados (2004); Philadelphia Soul (2005–2008); California Redwoods (2009)*; Dallas Vigilantes (2010); San Jose SaberCats (2011); Orlando Predators (2012); New Orleans VooDoo (2013–2014); Orlando Predators (2014); Las Vegas Outlaws (2015); Portland Steel (2016)*
- * Offseason or practice squad member only

Awards and highlights
- ArenaBowl champion (2008); 2× First-team All-Arena (2006, 2007); Second-team All-Arena (2008); First-team All-af2 (2004); First-team Division II All-American (2003); 2× First-team All-LSC (2002–2003); LSC Defensive Back of the Year (2003)

Career AFL statistics
- Tackles: 663
- Interceptions: 56
- Pass breakups: 129
- Touchdowns: 9
- Stats at ArenaFan.com

Eddie Moten (born August 30, 1981) is an American former professional football cornerback. He was signed by the Rio Grande Valley Dorados as a street free agent in 2004. He played college football at Texas A&M–Kingsville.

Moten has also played for the Philadelphia Soul and California Redwoods. He was featured on the football reality show 4th and Long in 2009.

== Professional career ==
=== Rio Grande Valley Dorados ===
Moten signed with the Rio Grande Valley Dorados of af2 in 2004, recording 47.5 tackles, two forced fumbles, 10 interceptions and 18 pass-breakups on his way to first-team All-af2 honors.

=== Philadelphia Soul ===
Moten was a member of the Philadelphia Soul of the Arena Football League from 2005 to 2008. In 2008, Moten helped the Soul win ArenaBowl XXII. He received All-Arena honors his final three seasons in the AFL, earning first-team selections in 2006 and 2007 as well as second-team honors in 2008.

=== 4th and Long ===
Moten was a member of former Dallas Cowboys wide receiver Michael Irvin's reality show 4th and Long. The winner of the show was giving the opportunity of participating in the Cowboys training camp to earn a spot on the team. Moten was the first one cut in the season finale after he had the worst stats in the game that was played.

=== California Redwoods ===
On August 18, 2009, it was announced that Moten had signed with the California Redwoods of the United Football League. He was released before the season began.

=== Dallas Vigilantes ===
Moten signed with the Dallas Vigilantes on January 8, 2010.

=== Portland Steel ===
Moten signed with the Portland Steel on February 12, 2016.
