= Jalen Myrick =

American football player and coach (born 1995)

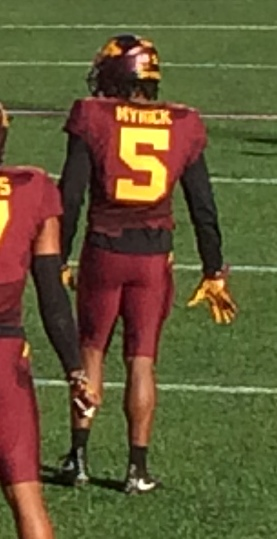
- Myrick with the Minnesota Golden Gophers in 2016

Midland Warriors
- Title: Defensive backs coach

Personal information
- Born: February 27, 1995 (age 31); Bloomingdale, Georgia, U.S.
- Listed height: 5 ft 11 in (1.80 m)
- Listed weight: 200 lb (91 kg)

Career information
- Position: Cornerback (No. 31)
- High school: Savannah Christian Preparatory (Savannah, Georgia)
- College: Minnesota
- NFL draft: 2017: 7th round, 222nd overall pick

Career history

Playing
- Jacksonville Jaguars (2017); Minnesota Vikings (2018–2019)*; Atlanta Falcons (2019)*; DC Defenders (2020)
- * Offseason or practice squad member only

Coaching
- Winona State (2022) Wide receivers coach; Winona State (2023) Defensive backs coach; Midland (2026–present) Defensive backs coach

Career NFL statistics
- Total tackles: 1
- Stats at Pro Football Reference

Jalen Myrick (born February 27, 1995) is an American former professional football cornerback and coach. He played college football at Minnesota, and was selected by the Jacksonville Jaguars in the seventh round of the 2017 NFL draft.

== Early life ==
Myrick attended Savannah Christian Preparatory School in Savannah, Georgia. He played football and ran track in high school with personal bests of 10.61 and 22.15 seconds in the 100 and 200 meters, respectively.

== College career ==
Myrick played at Minnesota from 2013 to 2016. During his career he had 93 tackles, five interceptions and two touchdowns.

== Professional career ==
=== Pre-draft ===
Myrick's 4.28 in the 40-yard dash marked the fastest time out of all the defensive backs at the 2017 NFL Combine.

Pre-draft measurables
Height	Weight	Arm length	Hand span	40-yard dash	10-yard split	20-yard split	20-yard shuttle	Three-cone drill	Vertical jump	Broad jump	Bench press
5 ft 9 5/8 in (1.77 m)	200 lb (91 kg)	31 5/8 in (0.80 m)	8 3/4 in (0.22 m)	4.28 s	1.49 s	2.50 s	4.15 s	7.02 s	37.5 in (0.95 m)	10 ft 4 in (3.15 m)	13 reps
All values from NFL Combine/Pro Day

=== Jacksonville Jaguars ===
The Jacksonville Jaguars selected Myrick in the seventh round (222nd overall) in the 2017 NFL draft. On May 11, the Jaguars signed Myrick to a four-year, $2.49 million contract with a signing bonus of $93,666. On December 24, Myrick blocked an extra point attempt by the San Francisco 49ers that was returned to the end zone for two points.

On September 1, 2018, Myrick was waived by the Jaguars.

=== Minnesota Vikings ===
On September 5, 2018, Myrick was signed to the practice squad of the Minnesota Vikings. He was released by Minnesota on October 16, but was re-signed a week later. Myrick was released again on October 27. He was re-signed to the practice squad on November 27.

Myrick signed a reserve/future contract with the Vikings on January 2, 2019. He was waived by the Vikings on April 11.

=== Atlanta Falcons ===
On August 18, 2019, Myrick signed with the Atlanta Falcons. However, he was waived by the Falcons on August 31 during final roster cuts.

=== DC Defenders ===
Myrick was drafted by the DC Defenders of the XFL in the 3rd round during phase four in the 2020 XFL draft. He was placed on injured reserve on January 31, 2020. Myrick was waived from injured reserve on March 7.
