= Demetris Robertson =

American football player (born 1997)

Profile
- Position: Wide receiver

Personal information
- Born: April 13, 1997 (age 29)
- Listed height: 6 ft 0 in (1.83 m)
- Listed weight: 185 lb (84 kg)

Career information
- High school: Savannah Christian (Savannah, Georgia)
- College: California (2016–2017); Georgia (2018–2020); Auburn (2021)
- NFL draft: 2022: undrafted

Career history
- Seattle Seahawks (2022)*
- * Offseason or practice squad member only

Demetris Rashaad Robertson (born April 13, 1997) is an American former football wide receiver. He played college football for the California Golden Bears, Georgia Bulldogs, and Auburn Tigers.

== Early life ==
Robertson attended Savannah Christian Preparatory School in Savannah, Georgia. A multi-sport athlete, he played basketball and participated in track and field in addition to football. Robertson initially attended Savannah Country Day School, before transferring to Savannah Christian prior to his junior year. As a senior, he rushed for 1,043 yards on 107 carries and nine touchdowns. As a result of his performance, Robertson was selected to play in the US Army All-American Game. A five-star recruit, he committed to play college football at the University of California, Berkeley.

== College career ==
As a true freshman, Robertson made an instant impact, becoming one of California's leading receivers. He finished the 2016 season totaling 50 receptions for 767 yards and seven touchdowns, earning freshman All-American honors. During the 2017 season, Robertson appeared in just two games before sustaining a lower-body injury that required surgery, resulting in him missing the rest of the season. He received a medical redshirt and transferred to the University of Georgia the following summer. Prior to the 2018 season, Robertson was ruled eligible to immediately play for the Bulldogs, rather than having to sit out the season to satisfy NCAA transfer rules. In the first game of the season against Austin Peay, he ran for a 72-yard touchdown run in the 45–0 rout. Robertson played sparingly during the 2018 season, recording no receptions. His production increased the following season, as he hauled in a touchdown reception during the season opener against Vanderbilt. Robertson finished the 2019 season totaling 30 receptions for 333 yards and three touchdowns. After recording 12 catches for 110 yards in 2020, he entered the transfer portal. In July 2021, Robertson announced his decision to transfer to Auburn University. In his final season, he caught 37 passes for 489 yards and four touchdowns.

=== Statistics ===
College statistics
Season	Team	GP	Receiving				Rushing			
Season	Team	GP	Rec	Yds	Avg	TD	Att	Yards	Avg	TD
2016	California	12	50	767	15.3	7	–	–	–	–
2017	California	2	7	70	10.0	0	2	40	20.0	1
2018	Georgia	9	–	–	–	–	4	109	27.3	1
2019	Georgia	13	30	333	11.1	3	6	52	8.7	0
2020	Georgia	10	12	110	9.2	0	–	–	–	–
2021	Auburn	12	37	489	13.2	4	5	42	8.4	1
Career		58	136	1,769	13.0	14	17	243	14.3	3

== Professional career ==
After going undrafted in the 2022 NFL draft, Robertson signed with the Seattle Seahawks as an undrafted free agent. On May 13, 2022, he was waived by the Seahawks.
