= List of mayors of Garden City, Georgia =

Garden City, Georgia was incorporated on February 8, 1939. It operates under a council-administrator form of government. By 2011, its city council was scheduled to be composed of one mayor and five city council members, each representing a different section of town.

The current mayor is Tennyson Holder. Re-elected to the city council in 2009, he was appointed by his colleagues to serve the remainder of Anthony "Andy" Quinney's unexpired mayoral term.

As of 2010, Garden City has never collected property taxes.

== Council meetings ==
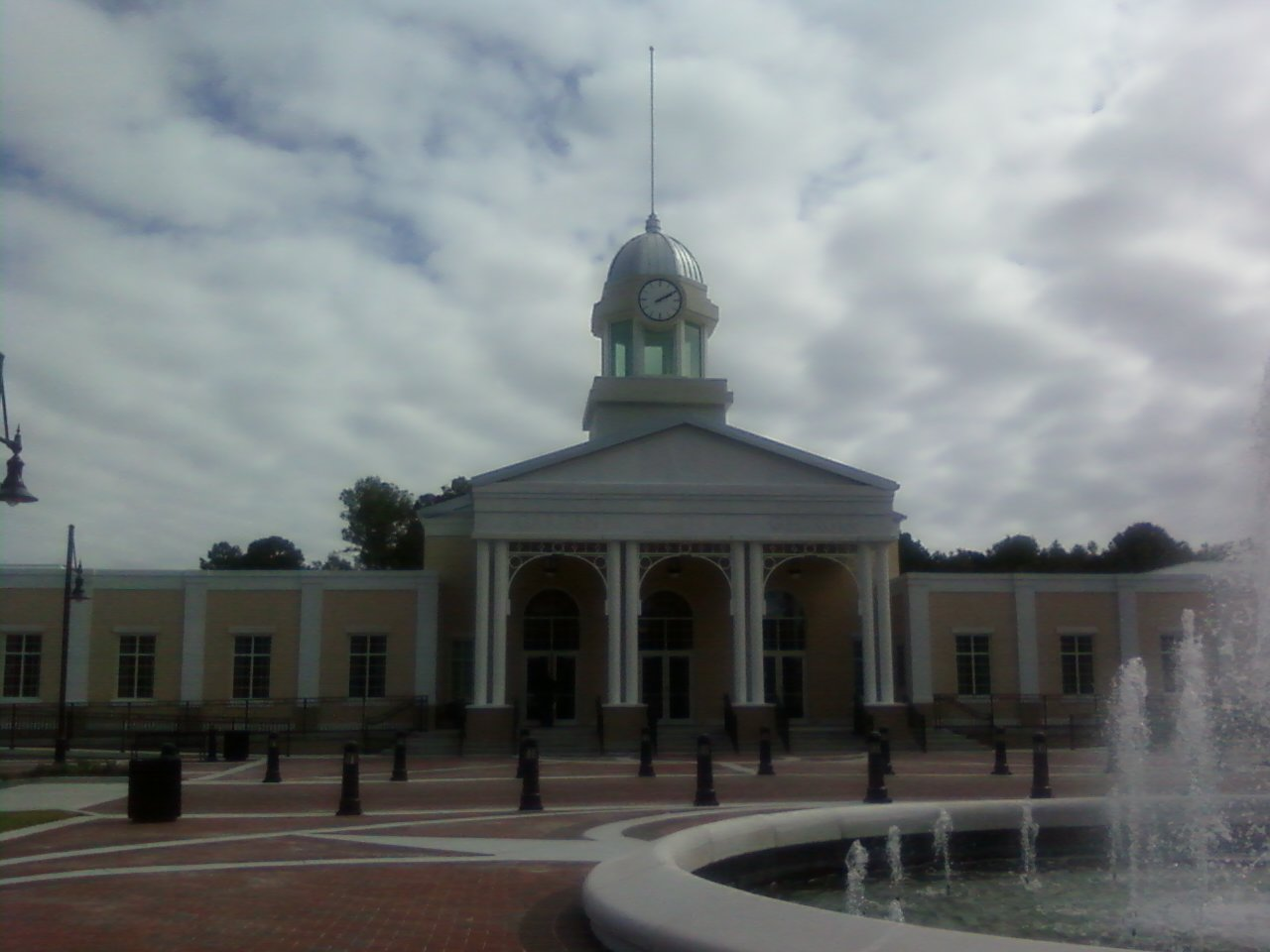
Located at 100 Central Avenue, the building that is currently used as the Town Center of Garden City, was opened to the public in 2009.

The council meets on the first and the third Mondays of each month at 7:00 p.m. Meetings have taken place at:

- Garden City Community House, 78 Varnedoe Avenue, from 1951 until 1963
- Garden City City Hall, 100 Main Street, from 1963 to 2009
- Garden City Town Center, 100 Central Avenue, since 2009

== Mayors ==
Until 2003, the mayor and the council members were elected to two-year terms of office. In 2003, staggered four-year terms were introduced.

Past and presents mayors are:

Inauguration	Term expiration	Mayor	Party	Other elective offices
April 7, 1939	December 11, 1941	Edgar C. Pipkin	Democrat	Chatham County commissioner, 1951–1961
December 11, 1941	December 9, 1943	Edgar C. Pipkin	Democrat	
December 9, 1943	December 13, 1945	Edgar C. Pipkin	Democrat	
December 13, 1945	December 11, 1947	Edgar C. Pipkin	Democrat	
December 11, 1947	December 8, 1949	Edgar C. Pipkin	Democrat	
December 8, 1949	December 13, 1951	J. Arlie Rowe	Democrat	Garden City Council member, 1939–1941
December 13, 1951	December 10, 1953	J. Arlie Rowe	Democrat	
December 10, 1953	September 3, 1954	J. Arlie Rowe	Democrat	
October 5, 1954	December 8, 1955	Warren F. Oglesby Sr.	Democrat	Garden City Council member, 1949–1954
December 8, 1955	December 12, 1957	Warren F. Oglesby Sr.	Democrat	
December 12, 1957	December 10, 1959	Warren F. Oglesby Sr.	Democrat	
December 10, 1959	December 14, 1961	Warren F. Oglesby Sr.	Democrat	
December 14, 1961	December 12, 1963	Rupert W. Bazemore	Democrat	Garden City Council member, 1955–1959
December 12, 1963	December 9, 1965	Rupert W. Bazemore	Democrat	
December 9, 1965	December 14, 1967	Rupert W. Bazemore	Democrat	
December 14, 1967	December 11, 1969	Rupert W. Bazemore	Democrat	
December 11, 1969	December 9, 1971	Rupert W. Bazemore	Democrat	
December 9, 1971	December 13, 1973	Rupert W. Bazemore	Democrat	
December 13, 1973	December 11, 1975	James M. "Jimmie" DeLoach	Democrat	Garden City Council member, 1971–1973; Chatham County commissioner, 1980–1992
December 11, 1975	December 8, 1977	James M. "Jimmie" DeLoach	Democrat	
December 8, 1977	December 13, 1979	James M. "Jimmie" DeLoach	Democrat	
December 13, 1979	December 10, 1981	Ralph O. Kessler	Republican	Garden City Council member, 1975–1979
December 10, 1981	December 8, 1983	Ralph O. Kessler	Republican	
December 8, 1983	December 12, 1985	Ralph O. Kessler	Republican	
December 12, 1985	December 10, 1987	E. James "Jimmy" Burnsed	Republican	Garden City Council member, 1979–1985; Bryan County commission chairman since 2005
December 10, 1987	December 14, 1989	E. James "Jimmy" Burnsed	Republican	
December 14, 1989	January 6, 1992	Ralph O. Kessler	Republican	
January 6, 1992	January 3, 1994	LeRoy "Roy" L. Crager	Republican	Garden City Council member, 1981–1992; 2000–2002
January 3, 1994	January 8, 1996	LeRoy "Roy" L. Crager	Republican	
January 8, 1996	January 5, 1998	James "Jay" W. Harrell	Republican	Garden City Council member, 1969–1987; 1989–1992; 2000–2002
January 5, 1998	January 2, 2000	Dean Kicklighter	Republican	Garden City Council member, 1996–1998; Chatham County commissioner, since 2000
January 2, 2000	January 6, 2002	Ralph O. Kessler	Republican	
January 6, 2002	January 5, 2004	Anthony "Andy" Quinney	Republican	Garden City Council member, 1998–2000
January 5, 2004	January 7, 2008	Anthony "Andy" Quinney	Republican	
January 7, 2008	September 25, 2009	Anthony "Andy" Quinney	Republican	
October 5, 2009	January 2, 2012	Tennyson Holder		Garden City Council member, 1992–2009

Color code: Democrat or non-partisan leaning Democrat Republican or non-partisan leaning Republican Independent

== Council members ==
Past and present council members are:

Willie L. Adams	1959–1961
Rupert W. Bazemore	1955–1961	Mayor of Garden City, 1961–1973
Viola W. Bell	1985–2000
Don Bethune	Since 2010
Frederick Dekle Blackburn Jr.	1988–1992
M.O. Blackburn Jr.	1954–1959
M.O. Blackburn Sr.	1940–1941; 1943–1945
John R. Blackwell	1949–1953
I. Clifford Blount Jr.	1947–1949
Bobby G. Bohler	1973–1975
Jessie L. Bowman	1953–1958
Clark F. Branch	1959–1961
James A. Bridgforth	1961–1965; 1969–1971
Elbert N. Brown	1953–1954
Ernest M. Brown Sr.	1961–1973
Robert "Bob" Bryant Sr.	1996–2004	Georgia House Representative, since 2005
E. James "Jimmy" Burnsed	1979–1985	Mayor of Garden City, 1985–1989; Chair of the Bryan County Commission, since 2005
J. Lawrence Cavanah	1961–1969; 1971–1973
Stanley Childers	1996–2000
Keith Cox	1971–1978
LeRoy "Roy" L. Crager	1981–1992; 2000–2002	Mayor of Garden City, 1992–1996
Lois T. Dasher	1978–1985
James M. "Jimmie" DeLoach	1971–1973	Mayor of Garden City, 1973–1979; Chatham County commissioner, 1980–1992
J.A. "Sonny" Dixon	1985–1988	Georgia House representative, 1989–1997
Ralph V. Dodd	1971–1981
Fred S. Elliott	1959–1961
C. Marvin Exley	1949–1959
Welcome G. Farr	1961–1967
Kay A. Ford	1996–1998	Member of the school board
Alton D. Fryer	1947–1958
W.J. Fussell	1947–1949
Scott A. George	2012–present	Mayor pro tem
Dan W. Gray	1941–1943
L. Fred Griffin, III	1989–1992
Joseph W. Guill	1943–1947
Gwyn L. Hall Sr.	1996–1998; since 2004
James "Jay" W. Harrell Jr.	1969–1987; 1989–1992; 2000–2002	Mayor of Garden City, 1996–1998
Amos C. Hathaway	1957–1959
Steve T. Hattrich Jr.	1965–1971
Edwin B. Hemby	1943–1947
Lawrence E. Hill Jr.	1973–1987
Claude Hodges Jr.	1973–1977
A. Tennyson Holder	1992–2009	Mayor of Garden City, since 2009
Connie S. Holland	1994–1996
Darrel Hutcheson	1977–1987
J.Q. James	1945–1947
M.C. Jones	1947–1949
R. Bowen Jones	1971–1992; since 2000
William B. Jones	1939–1945
Ralph O. Kessler	1975–1979	Mayor of Garden City, 1979–1985; 1989–1992
Bessie Kicklighter	Since 2002
Dean Kicklighter	1996–1998	Mayor of Garden City, 1998–2000; Chatham County commissioner, since 2000
W.A. Marks	1940–1943
John C. McCord	1939–1945
S.L. McDonald	1939–1941
William Durward Motes	Since 2004
Wendell P. Neville	1961–1965
Warren F. Oglesby Sr.	1949–1954	Mayor of Garden City, 1954–1961
Marion F. Peterson	1967–1969
W. Roy Poe	1952–1953; 1955–1957
Anthony "Andy" Quinney	1998–2000	Mayor of Garden City, 2002–2009
Ted O. Romine	1969–1971
J. Arlie Rowe	1939–1941	Mayor of Garden City, 1949–1954
George A. Seckinger	1961–1965
Misty Bethune Selph	2006–2010
Judy Moore Shuman	Since 2002
Carlie L. Smith	1965–1969
Edsel Smith	1965–1971
James "Jimmy" Lee Spilliards	2000–2004; since 2009
Jack C. Stafford	1961–1969
Ron Stephens	1994–1996	Georgia House representative, since 1997
Carl G. Story	1949–1953
Shelby Strickland	1996–2000
H.W. Tuten	1939–1940; 1941–1943
John Underwood	1969–1971
Hal A. Van Sickle	1940–1941; 1945–1949; 1954–1959
Robert Edward Wilder	1987–1992; 1994–1996; 2000–2002
Earl Wilson	2002–2004

== See also ==
- Garden City, Georgia
- Savannah, Georgia
- Mayors of Savannah, Georgia
