= Dylan McMahon =

American football player (born 2001)

No. 63 – Los Angeles Rams
- Position: Center
- Roster status: Injured reserve

Personal information
- Born: January 22, 2001 (age 25); Savannah, Georgia, U.S.
- Listed height: 6 ft 3 in (1.91 m)
- Listed weight: 290 lb (132 kg)

Career information
- High school: Savannah Christian (GA)
- College: NC State (2019–2023)
- NFL draft: 2024: 6th round, 190th overall pick

Career history
- Philadelphia Eagles (2024)*; Los Angeles Rams (2024–present)
- * Offseason or practice squad member only

Career NFL statistics as of Week 10, 2026
- Games played: 5
- Games started: 1
- Stats at Pro Football Reference

Dylan McMahon (born January 22, 2001) is an American professional football center for the Los Angeles Rams of the National Football League (NFL). He played college football for the NC State Wolfpack and was selected by the Philadelphia Eagles in the sixth round of the 2024 NFL draft.

== Early life ==
McMahon went to high school at Savannah Christian Preparatory School in Savannah, Georgia. While there, he lettered in wrestling and track, finishing second in the state of Georgia as a junior in the shot put and discus. In football, he played both offensive and defensive line in high school. Coming out of high school, he was ranked as a top-10 center nationally in the class of 2019. He committed to playing college football at NC State.

== College career ==
McMahon attended NC State University in Raleigh, North Carolina, from 2019 through 2024. In college and beyond, he stuck to playing on the offensive side of the ball.

McMahon redshirted his freshman year. In his subsequent four seasons at NC State, he logged 44 career starts. He played all three inside offensive line (OIL) positions in college, starting 22 games at right guard, 14 games at center, and 8 games at left guard. Eleven of those starts at center came during the 2023 season. He also missed two games in 2023 due to a knee sprain.

In his senior season, he earned an All-ACC Honorable Mention at center. He also accepted his invitation to play at the 2024 East–West Shrine Bowl.

== Professional career ==
Pre-draft measurables
| Height | Weight | Arm length | Hand span | Wingspan | 40-yard dash | 10-yard split | 20-yard split | 20-yard shuttle | Three-cone drill | Vertical jump | Broad jump | Bench press |
|---|---|---|---|---|---|---|---|---|---|---|---|---|
| 6 ft 3 3/8 in (1.91 m) | 299 lb (136 kg) | 31 3/4 in (0.81 m) | 9 3/8 in (0.24 m) | 6 ft 3 1/8 in (1.91 m) | 5.10 s | 1.75 s | 2.92 s | 4.33 s | 7.26 s | 33.0 in (0.84 m) | 9 ft 7 in (2.92 m) | 25 reps |
All values from NFL Combine/Pro Day

=== Philadelphia Eagles ===
McMahon was selected in the sixth round (190th overall) of the 2024 NFL draft by the Philadelphia Eagles. Prior to rookie minicamp, McMahon met Jason Kelce, who spent his entire 13-year career as the Eagles' starting center. Kelce told McMahon, "Undersized center? We have that in common."

McMahon was waived on August 27, 2024, and re-signed to the practice squad.

=== Los Angeles Rams ===
On September 11, 2024, McMahon was signed by the Los Angeles Rams off the Eagles practice squad.

On August 26, 2025, McMahon was waived by the Rams as part of final roster cuts and re-signed to the practice squad the next day. On January 27, 2026, he signed a reserve/futures contract with Los Angeles.
