= Savannah Christian Preparatory School =

Private school in Georgia, US

Location
- 1599 Chatham Parkway; Savannah, Georgia 31408; United States; 32°04′27″N 81°09′42″W

Information
- Type: Private Christian
- Motto: "To develop the whole person to the glory of God."
- Established: 1951 (75 years ago)
- CEEB code: 112698
- Grades: Pre-kindergarten - 12th grade
- Campus size: 250 acres (1.0 km^{2})
- Colors: Red and white
- Nickname: Raiders
- Affiliation: Christian, non-denominational
- Website: savcps.com

Savannah Christian Preparatory School (SCPS) is a private, college preparatory, non-denominational Christian school located in Savannah, Georgia, United States.

== Campuses ==
=== Chatham Parkway ===
The 254-acre (1.03 km^{2}) Chatham Parkway campus hosts over 1,180 lower, middle and upper school students, and 250 daycare/preschool students. Facilities include thirteen buildings with classrooms, labs, media centers, gyms, a dining hall, an outdoor pool, a track, five athletic fields, three playgrounds, and the Ecological Diversity for Educational Networking (E.D.E.N.) Outdoor Education Center.

This campus is the site of the Eckburg Center (opened in November 2007) which is the new fine arts and athletic facility for the Upper School as well as the new daycare/preschool center (opened in August 2008).

== History ==
On September 17, 1951, Rev. George and Mrs. Harold Deane Akins, launched SCPS as the "Evangelical Bible Institute" with eight students. It officially became Savannah Christian School in 1954, and then Savannah Christian Preparatory School (SCPS) in 1978.

== Student activities ==
=== Athletics ===
The Upper School currently competes in Region 3-A of the Georgia High School Association (GHSA). The Middle School competes in the Savannah Parochial Athletic League (SPAL).

Middle school:

- Boys - football, cross country, basketball, baseball, soccer, golf, track
- Girls - volleyball, cross country, basketball, soccer, golf, track, softball

Upper school:

- Boys - football, cross country, basketball, baseball, soccer, golf, tennis, track, wrestling, lacrosse, swimming
- Girls - volleyball, cross country, softball, competitive cheerleading, basketball, soccer, golf, tennis, track, lacrosse, swimming

=== Fine arts ===
Band is offered to 5th grade, with nearly 70% of the class participating. Students are divided into four groups that meet once per week and perform in concert at least twice each year. Choir is not provided for fifth grade.

=== Drama ===
Savannah Christian Preparatory School annually produces classic Broadway musical productions with casts of 3rd through 12th grade students.

== Notable alumni ==
- Warren Brinson - NFL defensive tackle for the Green Bay Packers (transferred to IMG Academy)
- Brian Harman - professional golfer
- Diane Lane - actress
- Dylan McMahon - NFL center for the Philadelphia Eagles
- Jalen Myrick - NFL cornerback for the Jacksonville Jaguars
- Demetris Robertson - former NFL wide receiver
