= Jesse Holley =

American football player (born 1984)

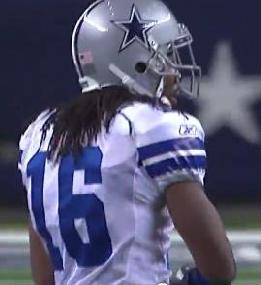
- Holley in the 2009 preseason

No. 16
- Position: Wide receiver

Personal information
- Born: January 8, 1984 (age 42); Roselle, New Jersey, U.S.
- Listed height: 6 ft 2 in (1.88 m)
- Listed weight: 213 lb (97 kg)

Career information
- High school: Abraham Clark (Roselle)
- College: North Carolina
- NFL draft: 2007: undrafted

Career history
- Cincinnati Bengals (2007)*; BC Lions (2008)*; Dallas Cowboys (2009–2011); New England Patriots (2012)*
- * Offseason or practice squad member only

Awards and highlights
- NCAA basketball champion (2005); 4th and Long winner (2009)

Career NFL statistics
- Receptions: 7
- Receiving yards: 169
- Stats at Pro Football Reference

Jesse Holley (born January 8, 1984) is an American former professional football player who was a wide receiver for the Dallas Cowboys of the National Football League (NFL). He was signed by the Cincinnati Bengals as an undrafted free agent in 2007. He played college football and basketball for the North Carolina Tar Heels. He won the reality TV show 4th and Long in 2009.

== Early life ==
Holley played in the band at Abraham Clark High School in Roselle, New Jersey, where he is the all-time leader in receptions (106), receiving yards (1,449) and touchdown catches (27). Holley also played quarterback, starting five games at the position. In his junior year, Holley caught 44 passes for 865 yards and 13 touchdowns. He finished his career with 106 receptions for 1,449 yards, and 27 touchdown receptions, and was ranked in the top 20 receivers by most recruiting websites and magazines. In basketball, Holley averaged 20 points per game and broke the school's career basketball scoring record.

== College career ==
Holley played for both the Tar Heels basketball and football teams at the University of North Carolina at Chapel Hill. He was a member of their 2004–05 basketball squad that won a national championship.

In football, he played in all 12 games as a freshman, had 12 receptions for 168 yards, two touchdowns and one tackle on special teams. Holley walked-on to the Tar Heels men's basketball team, where he was a backup guard and scored 11 points in 15 games as a freshman.

Holley played in all 12 games and became one of the starting receivers his sophomore season. He finished the season second on the team with 30 catches for 456 yards and two touchdowns. His 45-yard touchdown reception with 36 seconds left to play, was the go ahead score in a 31–24 win over Wake Forest University. He also played his last season of basketball, scoring 13 points in 10 games and was a part of the 2005 National Championship team.

Again starting all games his junior year, Holley led the team with 47 receptions for 670 yards and scored one touchdown. He was ranked fifth in the league in receiving yards per game and sixth in receptions.

Holley had 37 receptions for 466 yards and scored two touchdowns as a senior. At the time, he finished his career eighth in school history in career receptions (126) and receiving yards (1,760), averaging 14.0 yards per-catch and scoring 7 touchdowns.

== Professional career ==
Pre-draft measurables
Height	Weight	40-yard dash	10-yard split	20-yard split	20-yard shuttle	Three-cone drill	Vertical jump	Broad jump	Bench press
6 ft 2 1/8 in (1.88 m)	208 lb (94 kg)	4.65 s	1.55 s	2.70 s	4.40 s	6.98 s	34.5 in (0.88 m)	9 ft 9 in (2.97 m)	18 reps
All values from Pro Day

=== Cincinnati Bengals ===
Holley was signed as an undrafted free agent by the Cincinnati Bengals after the 2007 NFL draft. He finished the preseason with 3 catches for 25 yards. He was waived on September 4 and signed to the Bengals' practice squad three days later. On October 4, he was released to make room for wide receiver Marcus Maxwell.

=== BC Lions ===
After safety Barron Miles sent tapes to the BC Lions of the Canadian Football League; Holley signed with the team on May 22, 2008, and was released on June 15, following the team's first pre-season game.

=== Dallas Cowboys ===
Holley was the winner of Michael Irvin's football reality show 4th and Long and received an invitation to attend the Dallas Cowboys training camp. Before being on 4th and Long, he was working as a security guard, as well as selling cell phones in North Carolina. On July 21, 2009, he was officially signed by the Cowboys. Holley caught a pass on August 21, 2009, in the fourth quarter of the preseason game against the Tennessee Titans. On September 4, Holley returned a punt 82 yards for a touchdown against the Minnesota Vikings. The Cowboys released Holley the following day as a final cut. He cleared waivers and was signed to the Cowboys' practice squad on September 6, where he would spend the rest of the year.

Holley signed a futures contract with the Cowboys on January 22, 2010, after his previous agreement expired at season's end. On September 4, he was again waived at the final cuts and was signed to the team's practice squad the day after. He was promoted to the active roster on October 15 to play mainly on special teams. During that season he was active for 14 games and ranked third on the team with 16 special teams tackles.

In the August 27, 2011 preseason game, against the Minnesota Vikings, Holley recorded three catches for 51 yards. At the conclusion of the preseason he made the 53-man roster to be the fifth receiver on the depth chart.

On September 18, during the second game of the season against the San Francisco 49ers, he was the team's third receiver because Dez Bryant was inactive with a bruised quadriceps. He recorded his first NFL reception for 11 yards and made two more during the Cowboys' final drive in regulation, leading to overtime. In overtime, after a three-and-out by the 49ers offense, Holley was not supposed to be on the field for the first series, but he replaced Miles Austin, who had tweaked his hamstring. He ended up making a 77-yard reception during Dallas' first offensive play, taking the ball to the 1-yard line and setting up the game winning 19-yard field goal by Dan Bailey.

For the 2011 season (and career) he made a total of 7 receptions for 169 yards for an average of 24.1 yards per catch. He was not re-signed at the end of the year, as he was facing a knee injury.

=== New England Patriots ===
Holley was signed by the New England Patriots on June 11, 2012. He was released on September 1 and retired from professional football, wanting to further rehab an injured knee.

== Personal life ==
Holley is the younger brother of Jamel Holley, former mayor of Roselle, New Jersey, and current New Jersey Assemblyman from the 20th Legislative District. In 2013, Jesse became a member of the KRLD-FM Dallas Cowboys pre and post-game coverage. He also contributes and co-hosts other shows and podcasts at the station.

In 2023, Jesse launched his own podcast "Unfiltered With Jesse Holley" with sports media company Fanatics View, which covers the Cowboys and other NFL topics.

In 2024 Jesse started covering the Cowboys for the DLLS Cowboys podcast, a part of the ALLCITY sports network.
