= Garden City, Georgia =

City in the United States

- City
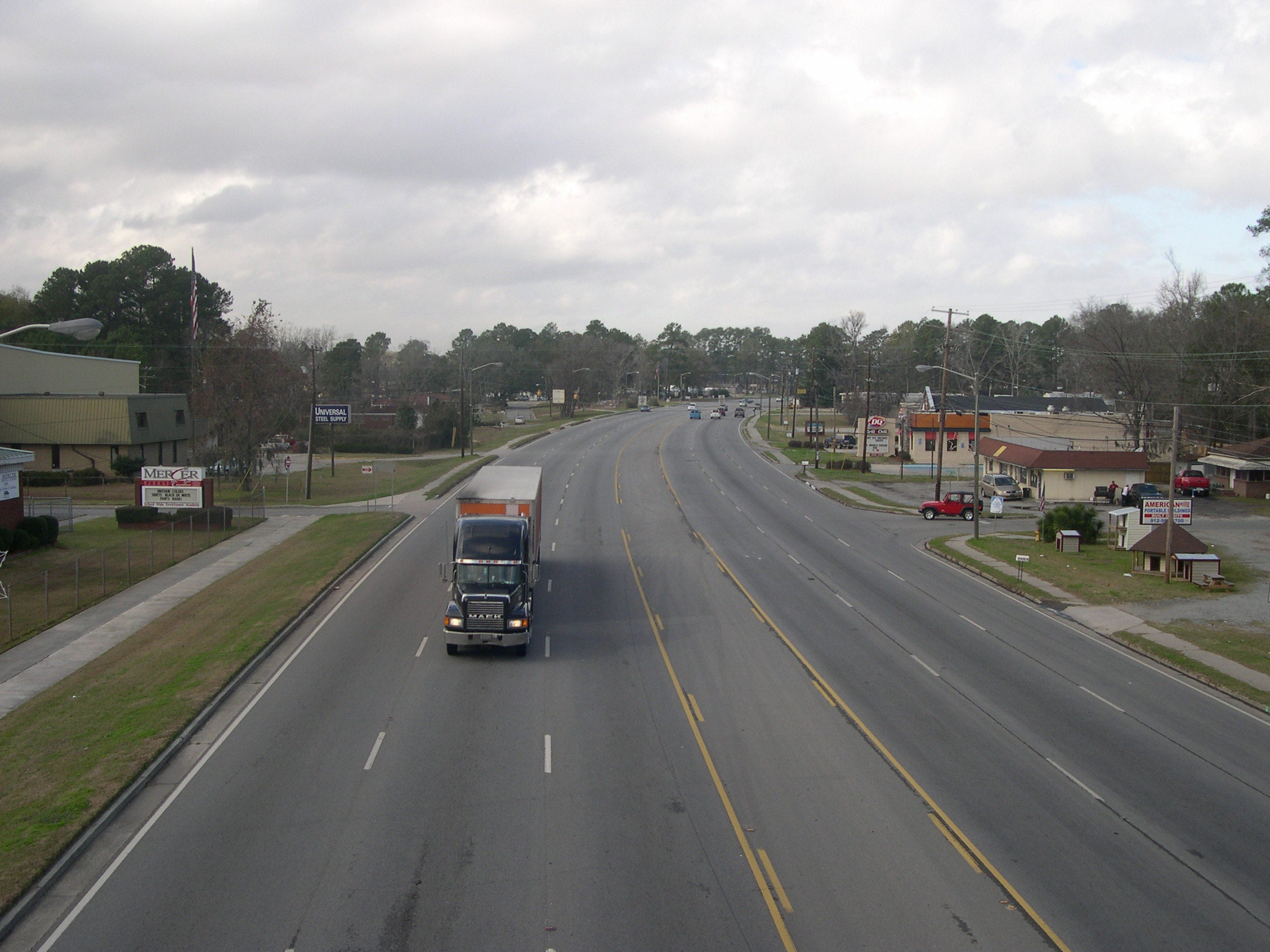
- The 5000 block of the six-lane Augusta Road with George A. Mercer Middle School on the left as well as a few businesses

- Flag Seal Logo
- Motto: "Faith - Fairness - Family - Freedom - Future"
- Location in Chatham County and the state of Georgia
- Coordinates: 32°6′1″N 81°9′54″W
- Country: United States
- State: Georgia
- County: Chatham

Government
  - Mayor: Bruce Campbell
  - City Manager: Scott Robider

Area
  - Total: 14.47 sq mi (37.48 km^{2})
  - Land: 14.32 sq mi (37.08 km^{2})
  - Water: 0.15 sq mi (0.40 km^{2})
- Elevation: 16 ft (4.9 m)

Population (2020)
  - Total: 10,289
  - Density: 718.6/sq mi (277.46/km^{2})
- Time zone: UTC-5 (Eastern (EST))
  - Summer (DST): UTC-4 (EDT)
- 31408: 31405
- Area code: 912
- FIPS code: 13-32048
- GNIS feature ID: 0331788
- Website: www.gardencity-ga.gov

Garden City is a city in Chatham County, Georgia, United States, located just northwest of Savannah. As of the 2020 census, the city had a population of 10,289. Part industrial and part residential, the city is home to much of the heavy industry in Chatham County. It is part of the Savannah metropolitan area. It hosts the largest and busiest ocean terminal of the Port of Savannah, the flagship operation of the Georgia Ports Authority.

Garden City was created in 1939 as Industrial City Gardens, a community intended to house the large workforce required by the new factories and chemical plants just west of downtown Savannah. Garden City is part of the Savannah metropolitan statistical area.

== Geography ==
Garden City is located northwest of the center of Chatham County at 32°6′1″N 81°9′54″W (32.100372, −81.164965). It is bordered to the southeast by the city of Savannah, to the west by the city of Pooler, and to the north by the city of Port Wentworth. To the northeast in unincorporated land is the Port of Savannah and the Savannah River.

According to the United States Census Bureau, Garden City has a total area of 14.3 square miles (37.1 km^{2}), of which 13.7 square miles (35.5 km^{2}) is land and 0.62 square miles (1.6 km^{2}), or 4.35%, is water.

== Demographics ==
Historical population
Census	Pop.	Note	%±
1940	734		—
1950	1,557		112.1%
1960	5,451		250.1%
1970	5,790		6.2%
1980	6,895		19.1%
1990	7,410		7.5%
2000	11,289		52.3%
2010	8,778		−22.2%
2020	10,289		17.2%
2025 (est.)	10,513	▲	2.2%
U.S. Decennial Census; 2025

=== 2020 census ===
As of the 2020 census, Garden City had a population of 10,289. The median age was 35.7 years. 24.0% of residents were under the age of 18 and 12.7% of residents were 65 years of age or older. For every 100 females there were 99.7 males, and for every 100 females age 18 and over there were 98.7 males age 18 and over.

97.7% of residents lived in urban areas, while 2.3% lived in rural areas.

There were 4,064 households in Garden City, of which 32.7% had children under the age of 18 living in them. Of all households, 32.1% were married-couple households, 26.5% were households with a male householder and no spouse or partner present, and 32.8% were households with a female householder and no spouse or partner present. About 29.3% of all households were made up of individuals and 8.7% had someone living alone who was 65 years of age or older. There were 1,734 families residing in the city.

There were 4,521 housing units, of which 10.1% were vacant. The homeowner vacancy rate was 1.8% and the rental vacancy rate was 6.5%.

Garden City racial composition as of 2020
Race	Num.	Perc.
White (non-Hispanic)	3,148	30.6%
Black or African American (non-Hispanic)	3,956	38.45%
Native American	17	0.17%
Asian	124	1.21%
Pacific Islander	11	0.11%
Other/mixed	339	3.29%
Hispanic or Latino	2,694	26.18%

== Economy ==
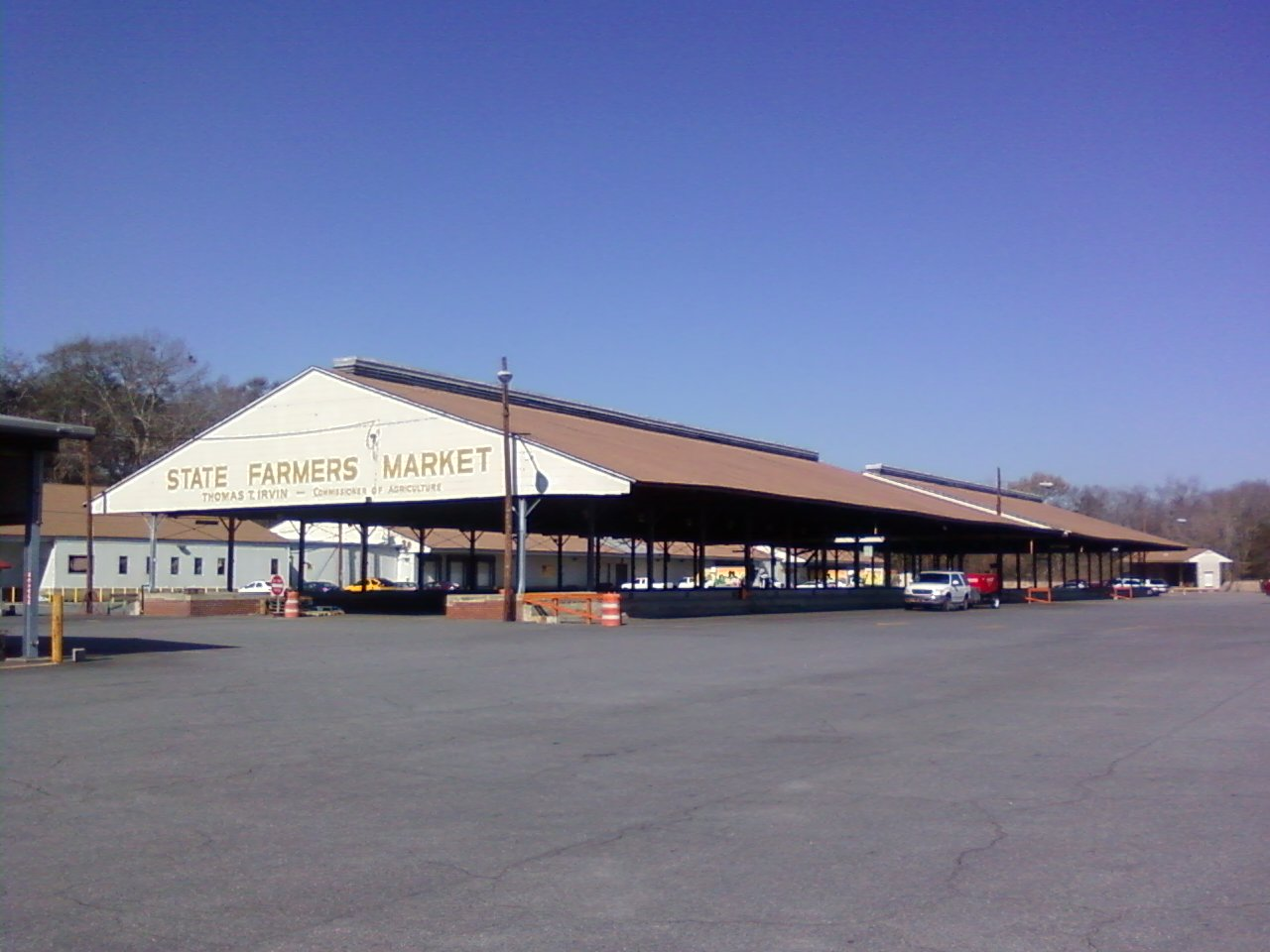
Located at 701 West U.S. Highway 80, the Savannah State Farmers' Market is one of twelve facilities operated by the State Department of Agriculture and used to support the local economy.

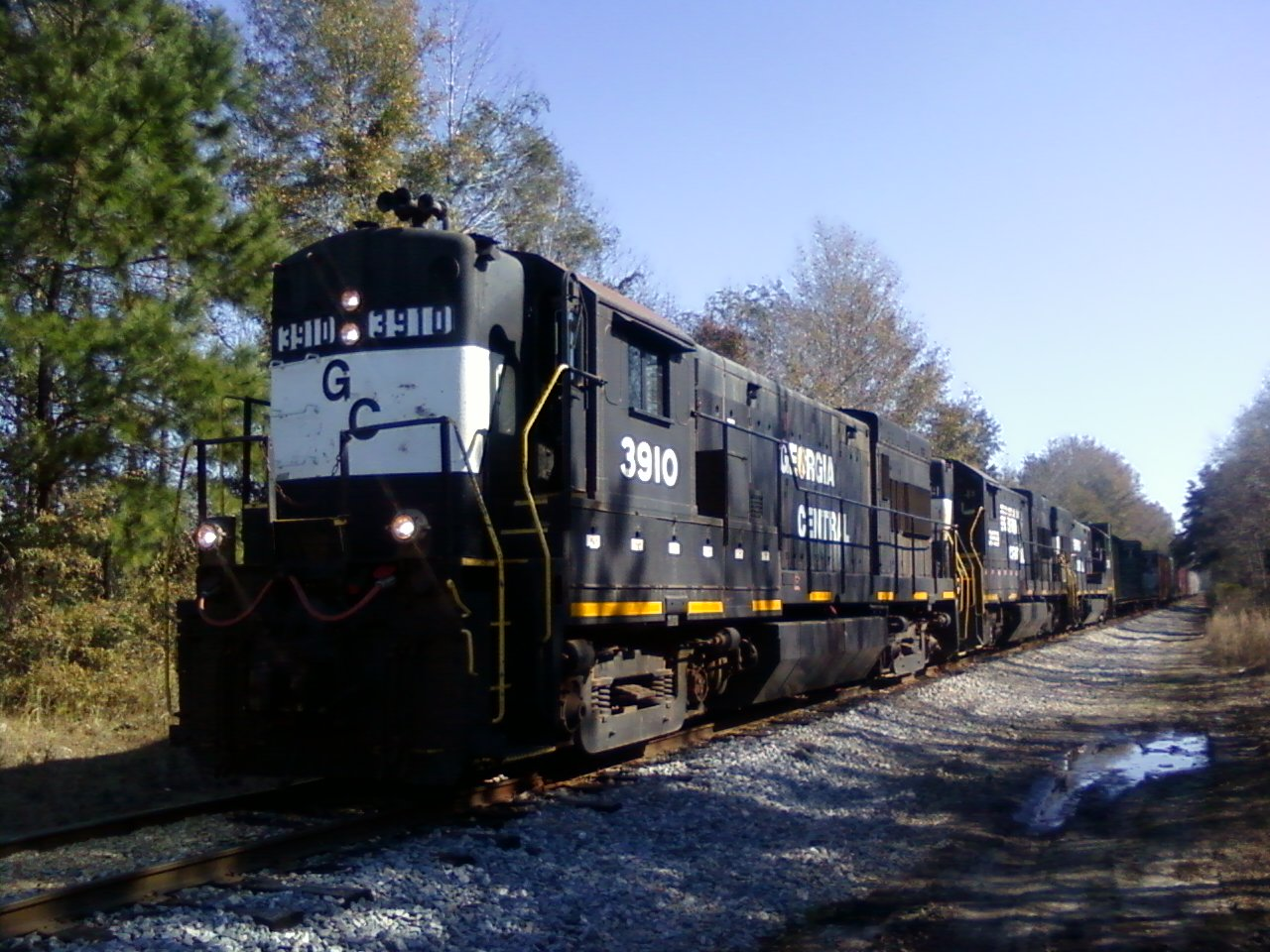
This Georgia Central Railway train transports merchandise at Telfair Road.

=== Agriculture ===
Located at 701 West U.S. Highway 80, the State Farmers Market is a farmers' market run by the Georgia Department of Agriculture.

=== Business ===
Commercial activities are traditionally concentrated near the junction of U.S. Highway 80, U.S. Highway 17 and State Highway 21 (an area once known as Traffic Circle), as well as along Augusta Road (Highway 21), where several long-term-stay hotels, franchise and independently owned fast food restaurants, financial institutions, pawn shops, strip shopping malls, gas stations, car repair shops and automotive retail stores are located.

=== Industry ===
Garden City's industry is located primarily on its waterfront, as is the case for surrounding communities. The Georgia Ports Authority operates a terminal, located at 2 Main Street. Garden City is also home to numerous trucking and railway companies. Other industries are:

== Politics ==
=== Municipal ===
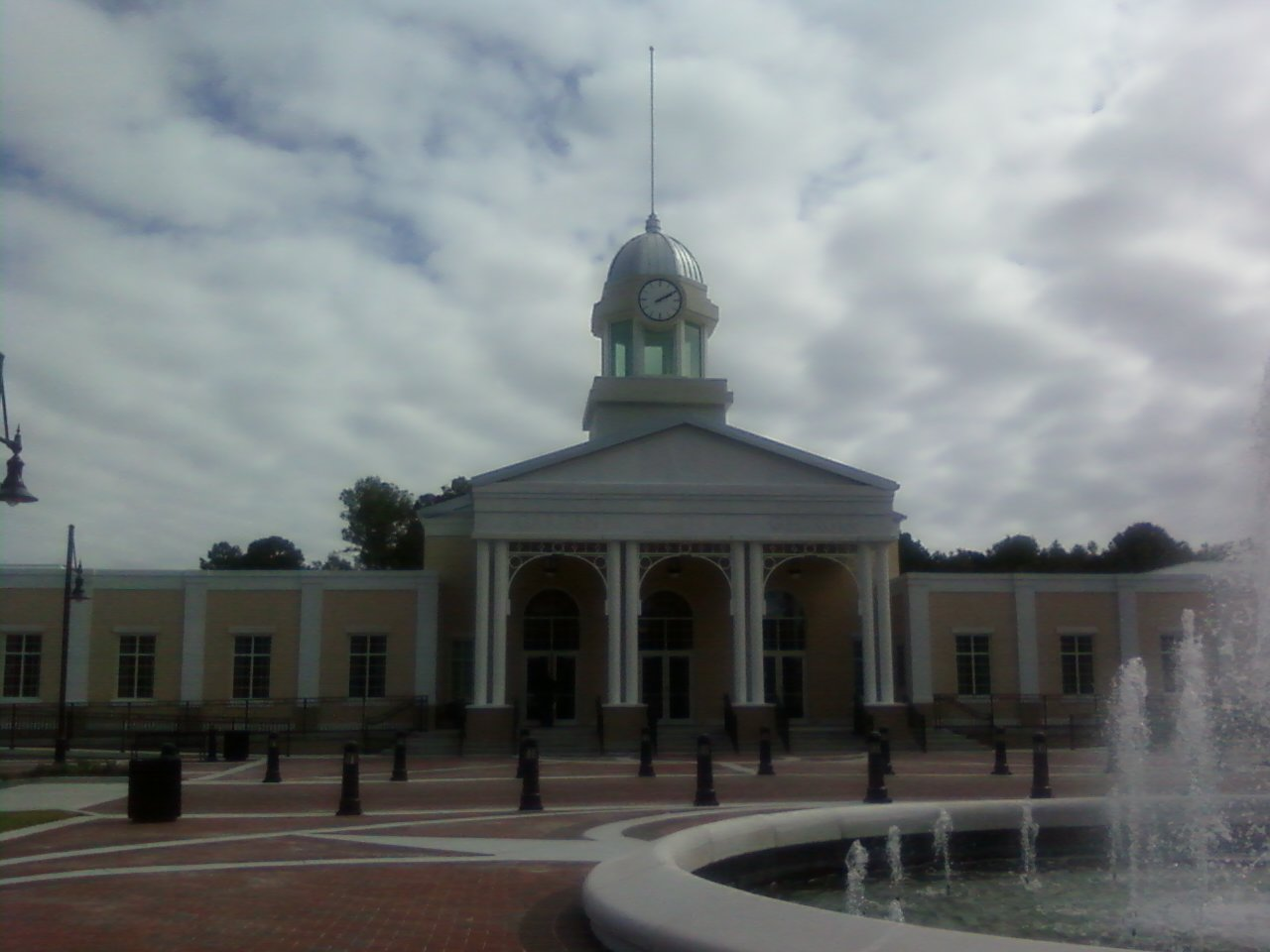
The building that is currently used as the Town Center of Garden City was opened to the public in 2009, under the administration of Mayor Andy Quinney.

Garden City operated under a mayor–council form of government until 2009. It has adopted a council-administrator style, and by 2011 it planned to replace its seven at-large council members by one at-large and five district-elected ones.

For a list of past and present mayors and council members of Garden City, see List of mayors of Garden City, Georgia.

As of 2010, Garden City has never collected property taxes.

=== Other levels of government ===
Garden City is represented by:

- the 7th and the 8th districts on the boards of the Chatham County Commission and the Savannah Chatham County Public School System
- the 162nd district in the State House
- the 2nd district in the State Senate
- the 1st congressional district in Congress

In the last three decades, the area's county commissioners have been:

Inauguration	Term expiration	7th district commissioner	Party	8th district commissioner	Party
1981	1985	James M. “Jimmie” DeLoach	Democrat	L. Scott Stell Jr.	Democrat
1985	1989	James M. “Jimmie” DeLoach	Democrat	Dorothy Barnes Pelote	Democrat
1989	1993	James M. “Jimmie” DeLoach	Democrat	Dorothy Barnes Pelote	Democrat
1993	1997	Eddie DeLoach	Democrat	Dr. Priscilla D. Thomas	Democrat
1997	2001	Eddie DeLoach	Democrat	Dr. Priscilla D. Thomas	Democrat
2001	2005	Dean Kicklighter	Republican	Dr. Priscilla D. Thomas	Democrat
2005	2009	Dean Kicklighter	Republican	Dr. Priscilla D. Thomas	Democrat
2009	2013	Dean Kicklighter	Republican	Dr. Priscilla D. Thomas	Democrat
2013	2017	Dean Kicklighter	Republican	Dr. Priscilla D. Thomas	Democrat
2017	present	Dean Kicklighter	Republican	Chester A. Ellis	Democrat

Color code: Democratic Republican Independent

=== State representation ===
The Georgia Department of Corrections operates the Coastal State Prison near Garden City.

== Public education ==
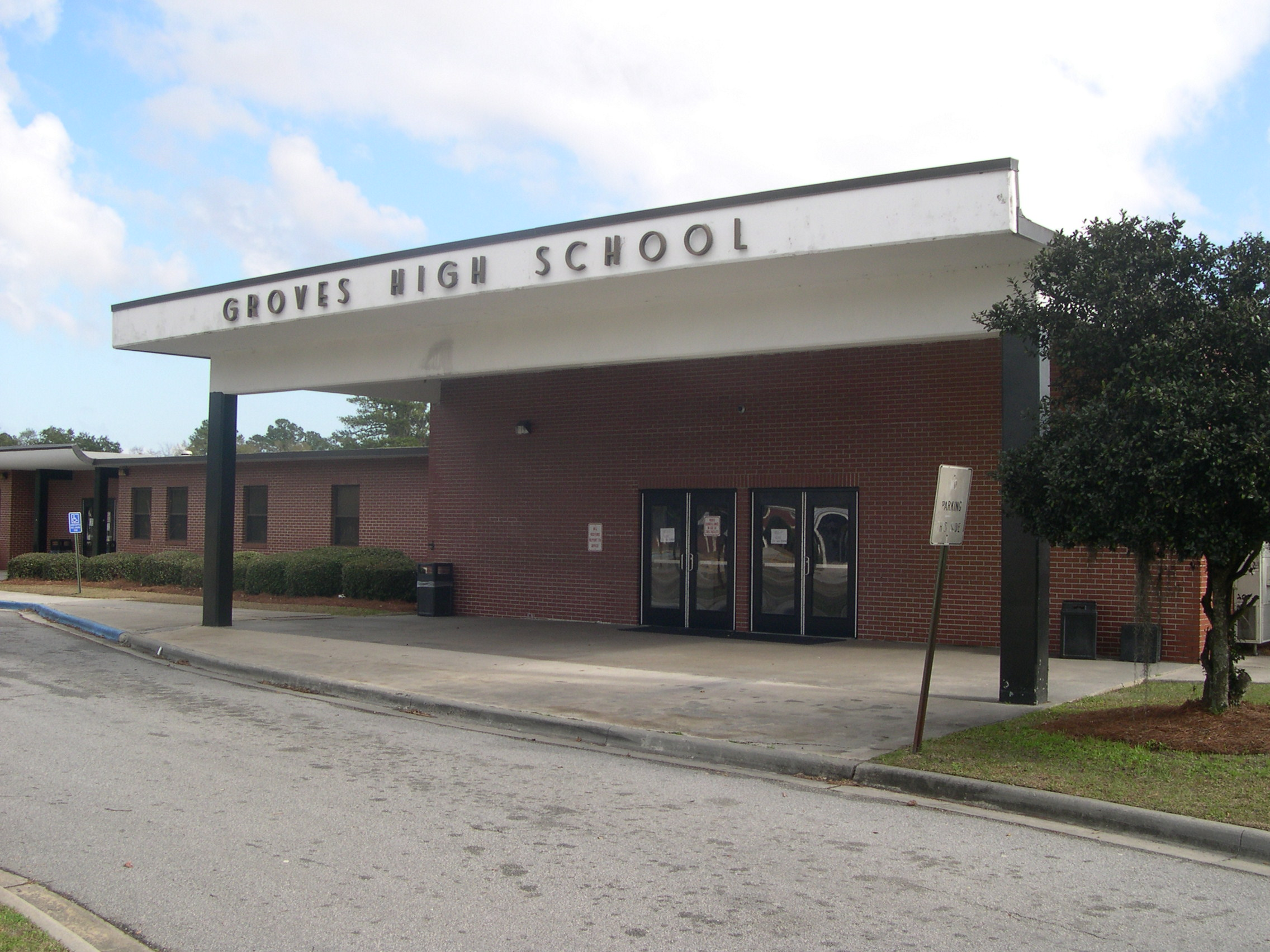
Robert W. Groves High School

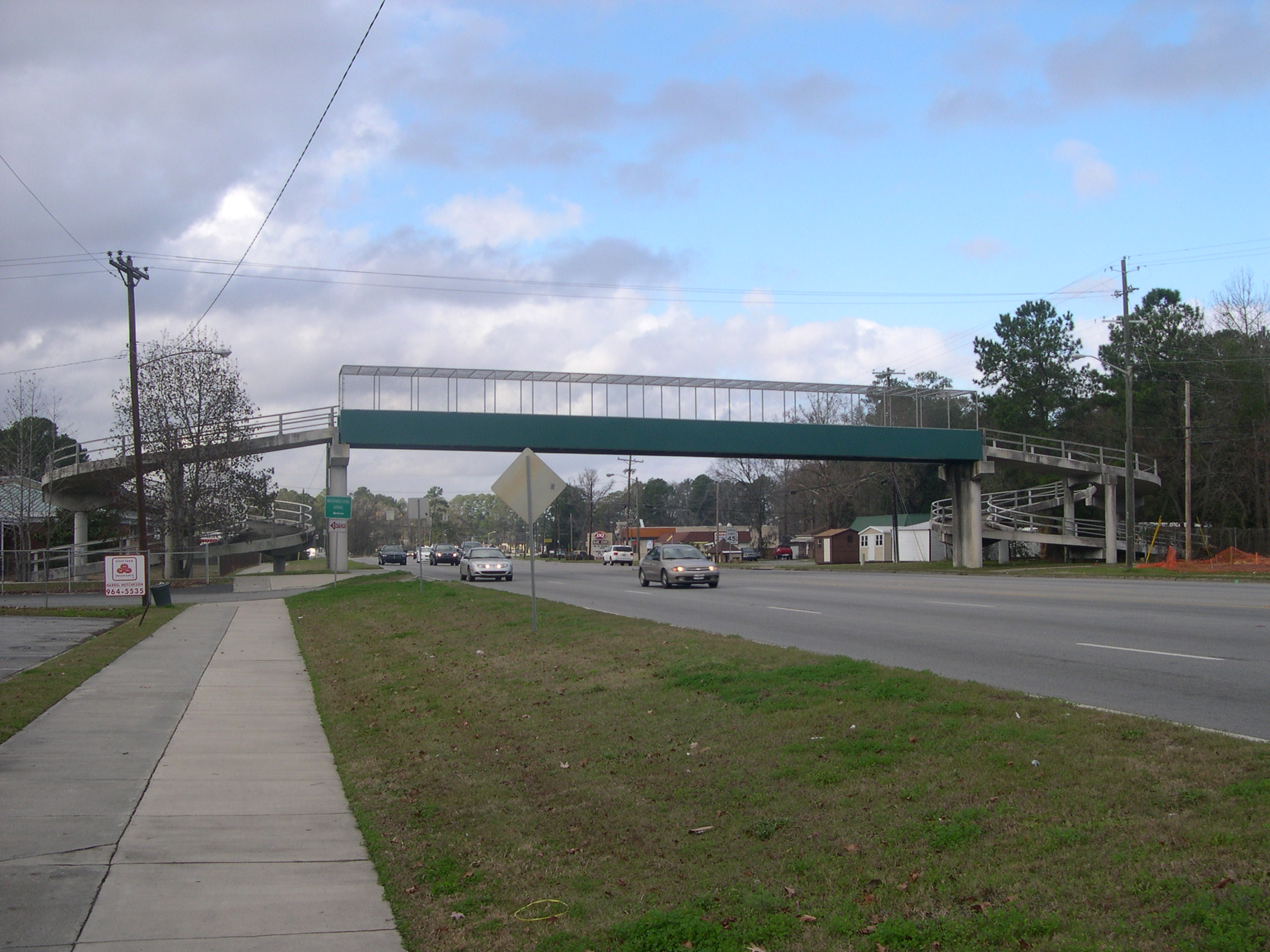
The Rommel Avenue Catwalk is used by the students of George A. Mercer Middle School and other pedestrians to safely cross Augusta Road (State Highway 21).

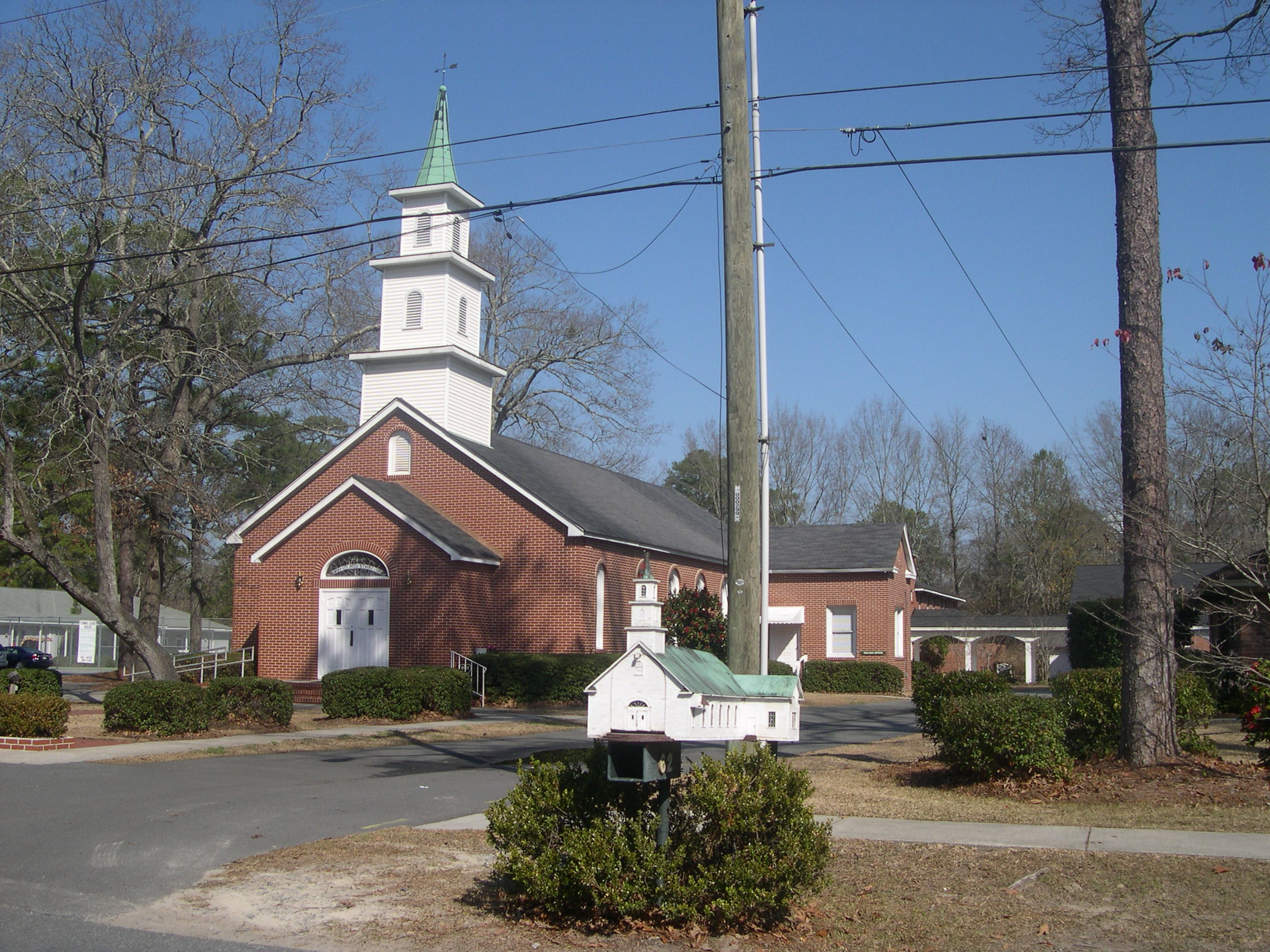
The Garden City United Methodist Church building is located at 62 Varnedoe Avenue, next to the Senior Citizen Center.

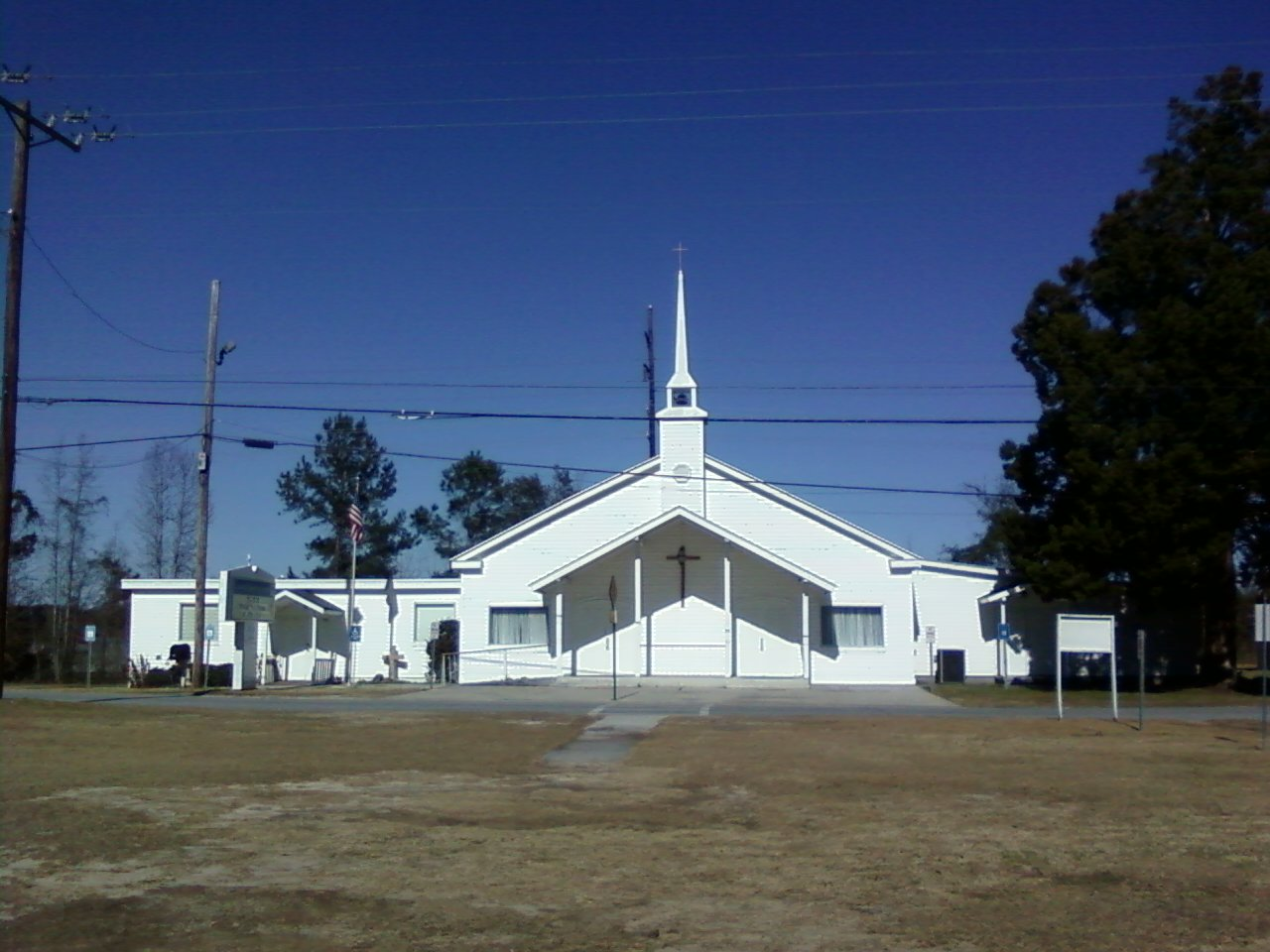
Central Baptist Church

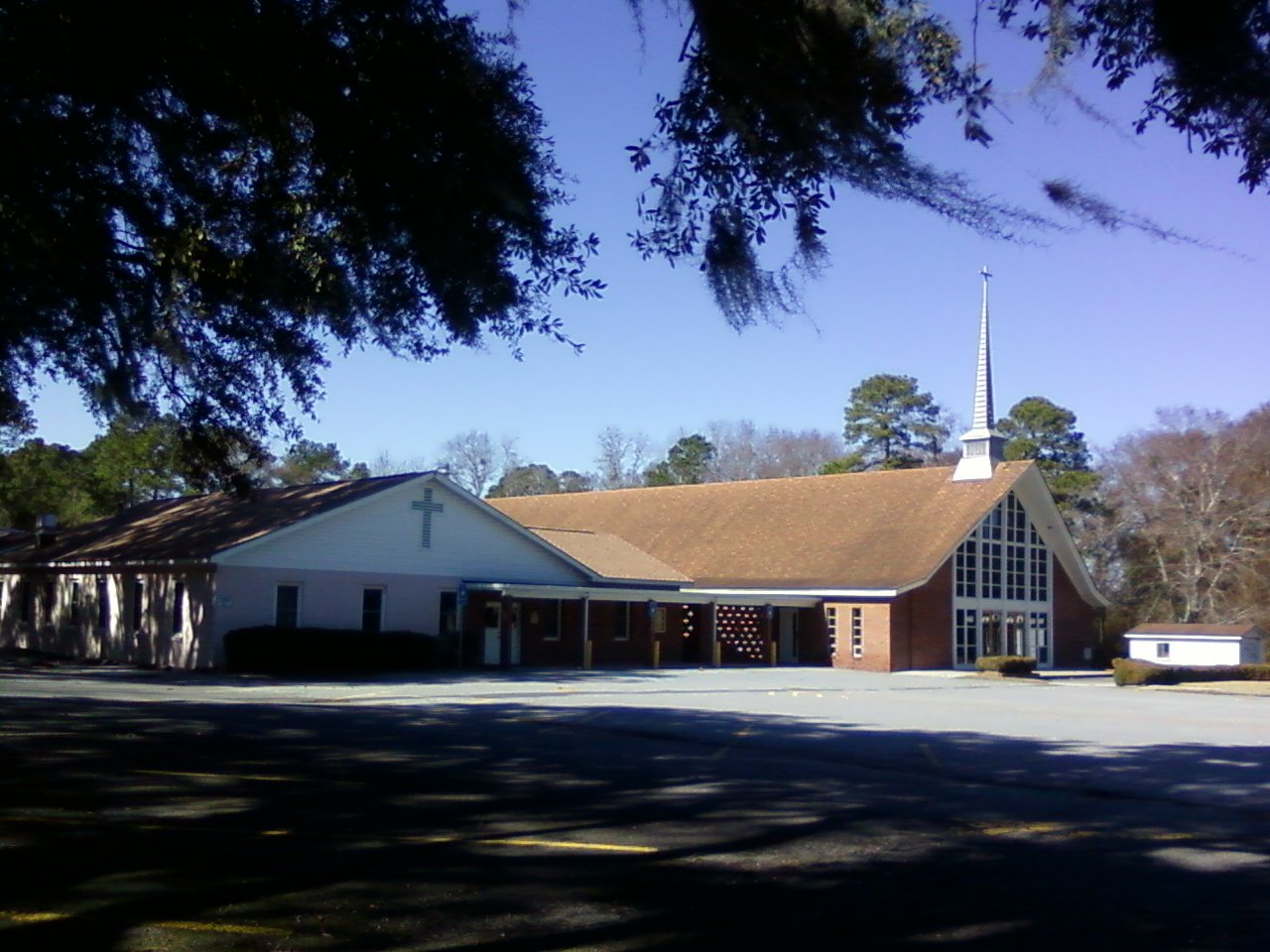
Woodlawn Baptist Church

Three public schools can be found within Garden City limits. They are managed by the Savannah Chatham County Public School System.

School	Location	Year established	Number of students
Garden City Elementary School	4037 Kessler Avenue	1996	575
George A. Mercer Middle School	201 Rommel Avenue	1962	880
Robert W. Groves High School	100 Priscilla D. Thomas Way	1958	1,454

Long known as "the pride of the Westside", Groves High School has a rich community tradition that dates back to its founding in 1958. Established to serve the young people and families of West Chatham County, the school is named for Robert W. Groves, a prominent business and civic leader in the county. Besides his role in business and his many commercial and community activities, Groves took particular concern for the youth of the area and their educational needs.

Groves High School is the home of the Fighting Scottish Rebels football and basketball teams. Campus points of interest include the Woodville-Tompkins Annex, where the automotive and construction programs are offered; and Cumming Field, named to honor Second Lieutenant Britt C. Cumming, a World War II veteran who was killed in action.

Mercer Middle School serves grades six through eight and is a part of the Savannah Chatham County School System (SCCPSS). Originally called Mercer Junior High School, Mercer Middle School first opened on September 4, 1962, and was the first climate-controlled school in Georgia. Mercer was named for George Anderson Mercer, an attorney who served as the president of the Board of Education from 1883 until his death in 1907.

Garden City Elementary School was built to serve the consolidated student population of the former Benjamin Sprague and Martin G. Haynes elementary schools.

== Parks and recreation ==
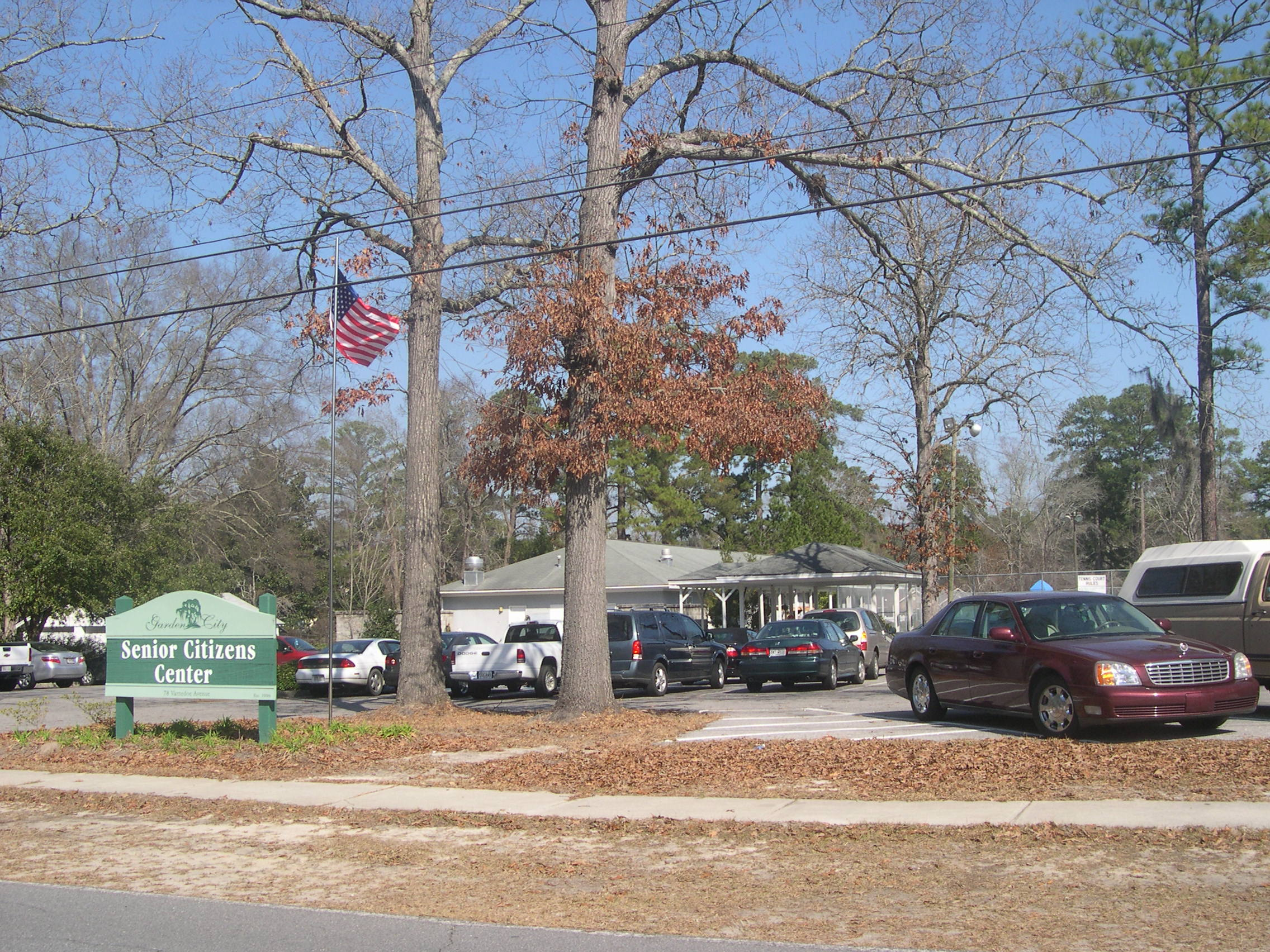
The Senior Citizens Center was dedicated in January 1996, under the administration of Mayor Roy L. Crager.

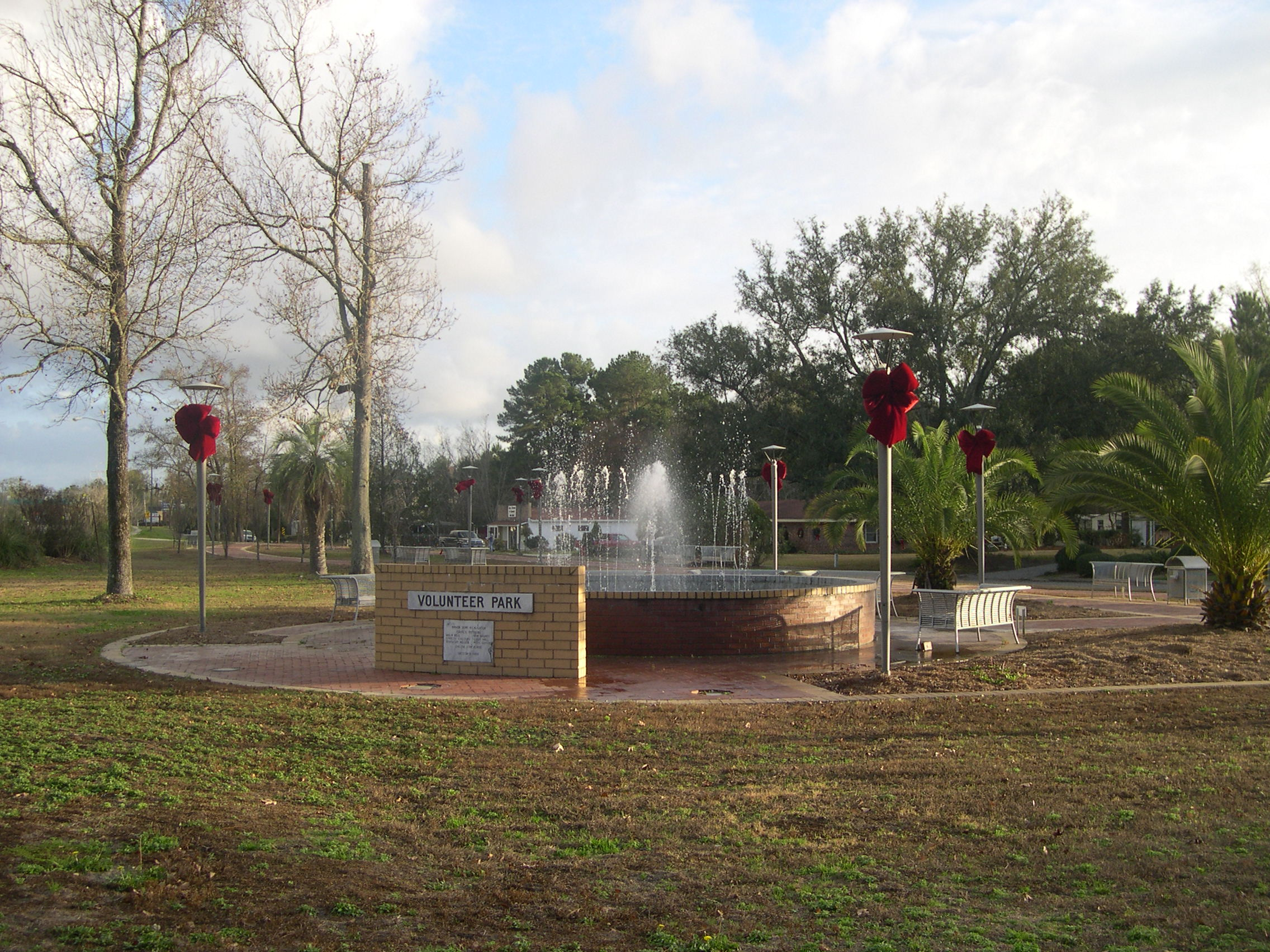
Volunteer Park was dedicated in December 1999, under the administration of Mayor Dean Kicklighter.

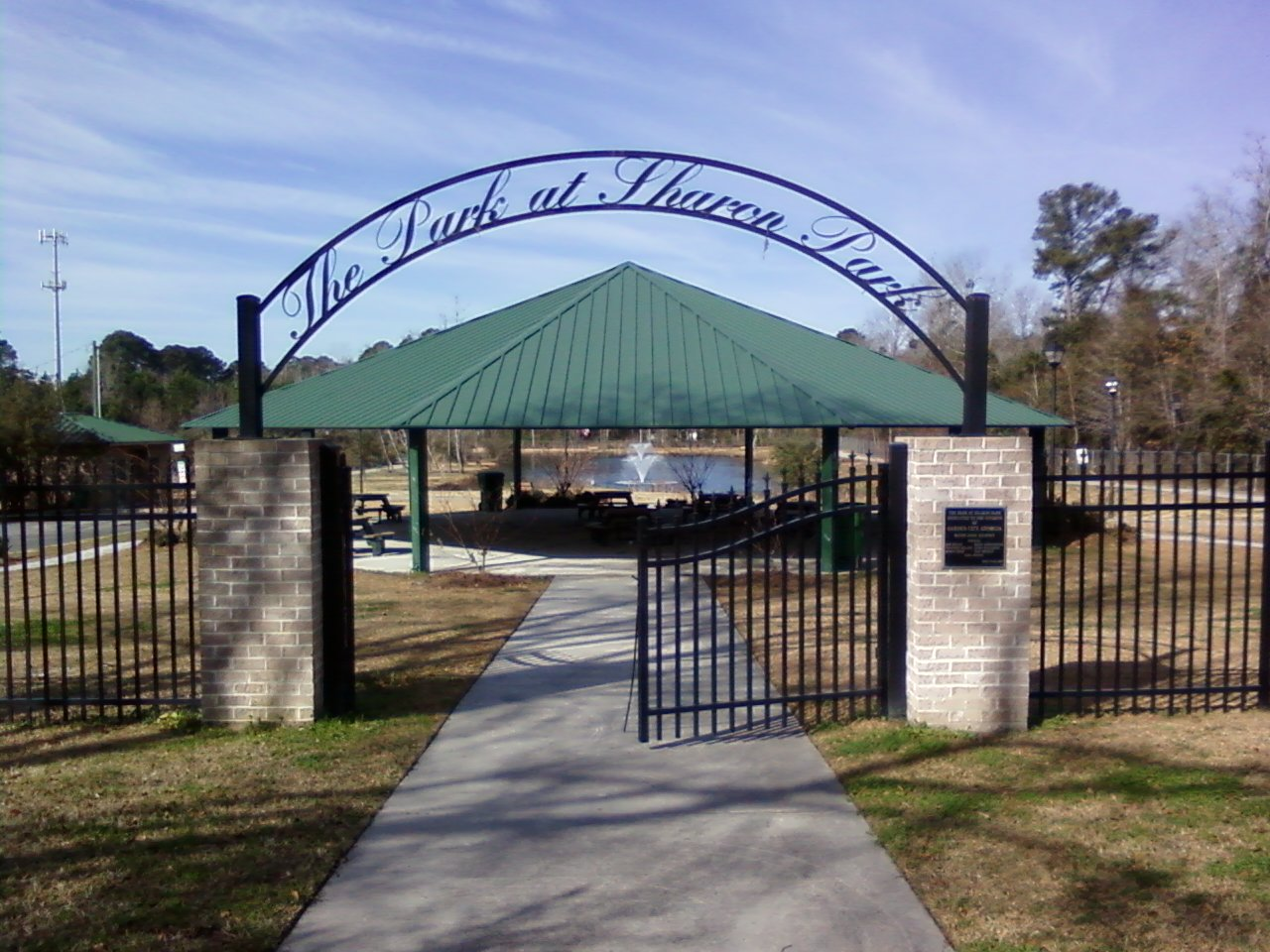
The Park at Sharon Park was dedicated in December 1999, under the administration of Mayor Dean Kicklighter, and rededicated in 2004, under the administration of Mayor Andy Quinney.

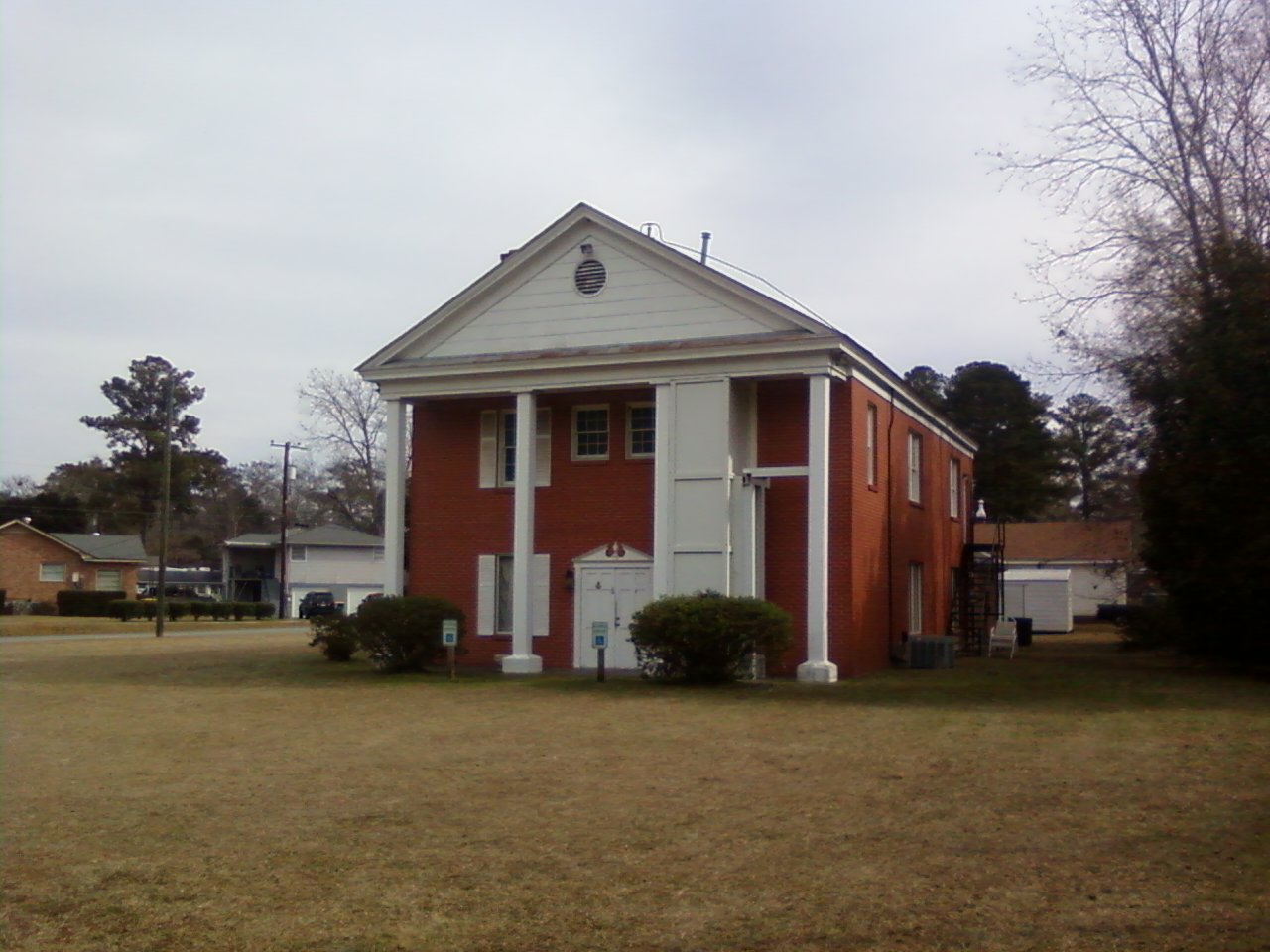
By 1950, the Eastern Star Masonic Hall, located at 131 Rommel Avenue, was listed in R.L. Polk's Savannah City Directory.

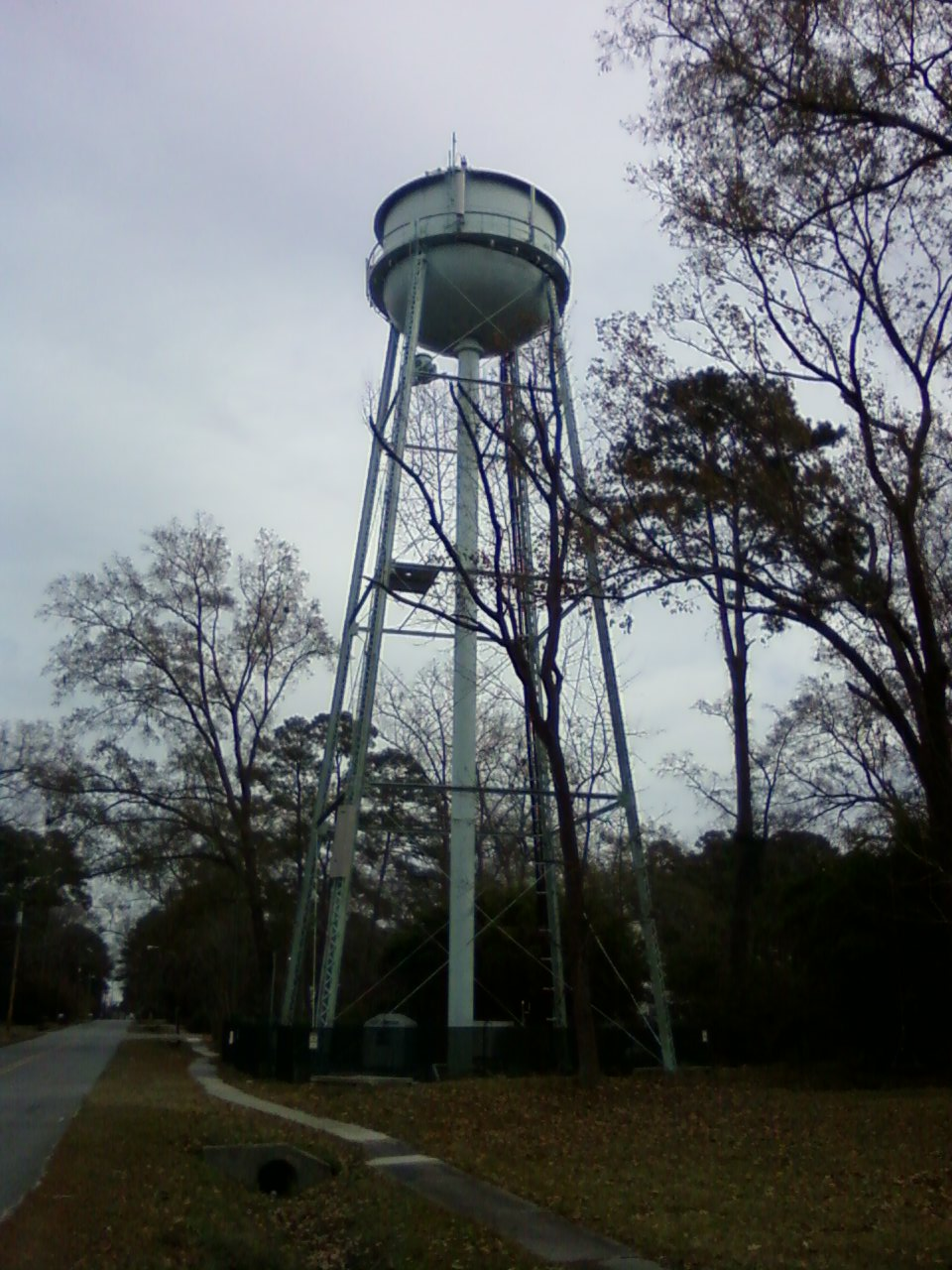
The geographical reference of this water tower, located at the intersection of Nelson and Rommel avenues, is 32°6′49.7″N 81°9′16.4″W.

Services to the citizens of Garden City include:

Facility	Location
Garden City Branch of the Live Oak Public Libraries	104 Sunshine Avenue
Port City Branch of the Live Oak Public Libraries	3501 Houlihan Avenue
Garden City Community & Senior Citizens	78 Varnedoe Avenue

The Garden City Parks and Recreation Department has year-round programs available for citizens. Youth sports include baseball, girls' fast pitch softball, T-ball, football, cheerleading, soccer, gymnastics and basketball. The city also provides non-team activities such as a summer day camp (Camp Eagle), roller skating, after-school programs, and a center for senior citizens. Garden City is home to five public parks. All are managed by the municipal City Parks & Recreation Department, headquartered at 160B Priscilla D. Thomas Way.

Park	Location	Primary use	Monuments/facilities
Bazemore Park	1 Bud Brown Drive	Recreational	Baseball complex
Griffin Park	500 Griffin Road	Recreational	Playground
The Park at Sharon Park	507 Sharon Park Drive	Recreational	Two playgrounds, gazebo, pond and hiking trail
Town Green	100 Central Avenue	Esthetic	Fountain and benches
Volunteer Park	5100 Augusta Road (State Highway 21)	Commemorative	Fountain and benches

== Other landmarks ==
Other landmarks located in Garden City include:

- The Air National Guard facility at 1401 Robert B. Miller Jr. Road
- Coastal State Prison, located at 200 Gulfstream Road and dedicated on May 12, 1981; it replaced the Chatham Correctional Institution as the local-based state-run correctional facility
- The Dotson House (the oldest residence in Garden City), built in 1850 and moved from the surroundings of George A. Mercer School to the site of the current town center
- Fire Department Station No. 1, 160 Main Street
- Fire Department Station No. 2, 2406 U.S. Highway 80 West
- The Order of the Eastern Star's local branch, located at 131 Rommel Avenue
- Hillcrest Abby West Cemetery, located on Dean Forest Road
