= Ahmaad Smith =

American football player and coach (born 1983)

Rice Owls
- Title: Quality control coordinator

Personal information
- Born: February 28, 1983 (age 43); Nashville, Tennessee, U.S.
- Listed height: 6 ft 0 in (1.83 m)
- Listed weight: 205 lb (93 kg)

Career information
- College: Tennessee State
- NFL draft: 2006: undrafted

Career history

Playing
- Mississippi MudCats (2007); Texas Copperheads (2007); Team Tennessee (2008); BC Lions (2008)*; Toronto Argonauts (2010)*; Iowa Barnstormers (2010); Pittsburgh Power (2012)*
- * Offseason or practice squad member only

Coaching
- Hampden–Sydney Tigers (2012–2014) Defensive backs coach; Tennessee Titans (2015) Coaching intern; Catawba Indians (2015–2017) Defensive backs coach; Minnesota Vikings (2017) Coaching intern; Tennessee State (2018–2020) Defensive backs coach & passing game coordinator; Cincinnati Bengals (2020) Coaching intern; Dartmouth (2021) Defensive assistant; Dartmouth (2022) Assistant secondary coach & nickelbacks coach; Rice (2023) Quality control coordinator & safeties coach; Rice (2024–present) Quality control coordinator
- Stats at CFL.ca (archive)
- Stats at ArenaFan.com

Ahmaad Smith (born February 28, 1983) is an American football coach and former defensive back who played one season with the Iowa Barnstormers of the Arena Football League (AFL). He is the quality control coordinator for Rice University, a position he has held since 2024. He played college football at Tennessee State University. He was also a member of the Mississippi MudCats, Texas Copperheads, Team Tennessee, BC Lions, Toronto Argonauts and Pittsburgh Power. Smith appeared on Michael Irvin's reality show 4th and Long.

== Early life ==
Smith played basketball in high school and did not play football until his senior year.

== College career ==
Smith was a four-year letterman and two-year starter for the Tennessee State Tigers from 2002 to 2005, recording 13 tackles, three pass break ups and one interception. He was a defensive captain his senior season in 2005. He also played basketball for the Tigers. Smith earned his BBA in business information systems from Tennessee State University in 2006.

== Professional career ==
Smith played in six games for the Mississippi MudCats of the American Indoor Football Association during the 2007 season, recording 14.5 tackles, five pass breakups and four interceptions for 34 yards and one touchdown. He played for the Texas Copperheads of the af2 in 2007, recording 14.5 total tackles, one interception, 8 pass breakups and one forced fumble. He was selected by Team Tennessee of the All American Football League (AAFL) with the 218th pick in the 2008 AAFL draft and signed with the team on February 7, 2008. The AAFL later cancelled the 2008 season and never began play. Smith was signed by the BC Lions of the Canadian Football League (CFL) on May 13, 2008. He was released by the Lions on June 15, 2008. He was a finalist on Michael Irvin's reality show 4th and Long. Smith signed with the Toronto Argonauts of the CFL on January 29, 2010. He was released by the Argonauts on June 20, 2010. He was assigned to the Iowa Barnstormers of the Arena football League (AFL) on November 10, 2009, and played for the team during the 2010 season, recording two tackles. Smith was assigned to the Pittsburgh Power of the AFL on October 12, 2011. He was reassigned by the Power on February 27, 2012.

== Coaching career ==
Smith served as defensive backs coach of the Hampden–Sydney Tigers of Hampden–Sydney College. He was the runner-up for the American Football Coaches Association Division III Assistant Coach of the Year Award in 2013. He was awarded The Bill Walsh Minority Coaching Internship to the Tennessee Titans in 2015, working with the defensive backs. Smith has also served as a football coach at Northview High School in Johns Creek, Georgia. He became defensive backs coach of the Catawba Indians of Catawba College in 2015.

== Personal life ==
Smith's father John Henry Smith also played football for the Tennessee State Tigers and drafted to the Cleveland Browns. NFL player Richard Dent is Ahmaad's godfather.
