= Don Silvestri =

American football player (born 1968)

No. 2, 5, 6
- Position: Placekicker

Personal information
- Born: December 25, 1968 (age 57); Pittsburgh, Pennsylvania, U.S.
- Listed height: 6 ft 4 in (1.93 m)
- Listed weight: 204 lb (93 kg)

Career information
- High school: Pennridge (PA)
- College: Pittsburgh
- NFL draft: 1992: undrafted

Career history
- Seattle Seahawks (1992)*; Sacramento Gold Miners (1993)*; Buffalo Bills (1994)*; Baltimore Stallions (1994)*; London Monarchs (1995); New York Jets (1995–1996); London Monarchs (1997-1998); Albany Firebirds (1998–1999); Florida Bobcats (2000–2001)
- * Offseason or practice squad member only

Awards and highlights
- ArenaBowl champion (1999)

Career NFL statistics
- Punts: 5
- Punt yards: 238
- Longest punt: 61
- Stats at Pro Football Reference

Career AFL statistics
- Field goals made: 16
- Field goal attempts: 48
- Field goal %: 33.3
- Stats at ArenaFan.com

Donald G. Silvestri (born December 25, 1968) is an American former professional football player who was a placekicker for various teams and leagues, including the New York Jets of the National Football League (NFL). He played college football for the Pittsburgh Panthers. Silvestri was signed by the Seattle Seahawks, of the NFL, as an undrafted free agent in 1993. He is the president of Debt.com and a founding member of the charity organization Parkland Cares. Silvestri was also the winner of the President's Volunteer Service Award. The award honors those who have had more than 4,000 hours of volunteer service.

== Early years ==
Silvestri was a two-year football letterman at the University of Pittsburgh from 1990 to 1991. Silvestri attended Pennridge High School in Perkasie, Pennsylvania.

== Professional career ==
Silvestri has been a member of the Seattle Seahawks (1993), Buffalo Bills (1994), New York Jets (1995–1997), London Monarchs (1995, 1997, 1998), Albany Firebirds (1998–1999), Florida Bobcats (2000) and the Canadian Football League's American expansion team Baltimore Stallions (1993).

=== NFL Europe ===
On May 7, 1995, Silvestri created history with the London Monarchs after kicking professional football's first four-point field goal, awarded for successful attempts from 50 yards or more in the NFL sanctioned World League of American Football (WLAF).

=== National Football League ===
Silvestri established himself as one of the NFL's leading kickoff specialists in 1995. He led the AFC and finished 2nd in the NFL to Morten Anderson with 14 touchbacks. He had 8 games with at least 1 touchback and had 5 games with 2 or more.

=== Arena Football League ===
Silvestri is the only Arena Football League player in history to finish a season with a perfect extra point percentage with the Florida Bobcats in 2000. Silvestri was a key member of the Arena League champion Albany Firebirds in 1999.

== Personal life ==
Silvestri lives in South Florida and is active in his local community. He is currently a member of the National Football League Alumni Association and the South Florida Pitt Club, an Alumni club of the University of Pittsburgh.
