= Mike Pawlawski =

American football player (born 1969)

No. 9
- Position: Quarterback

Personal information
- Born: July 18, 1969 (age 57); Los Angeles, California, U.S.

Career information
- High school: Troy (Fullerton, California)
- College: California
- NFL draft: 1992: 8th round, 222nd overall pick

Career history
- Tampa Bay Buccaneers (1992); Baltimore Stallions (1994)*; Miami Hooters (1995); San Jose SaberCats (1995); Shreveport Pirates (1995); Albany Firebirds (1996–2000); San Francisco Demons (2001)
- * Offseason or practice squad member only

Awards and highlights
- ArenaBowl champion (1995); First-team All-Arena (1999); Second-team All-Arena (2001); AFL passing yards leader (1997); AFL passer rating leader (1999); Second-team AFL 15th Anniversary Team (2001); Pac-10 Co-Offensive Player of the Year (1991); First-team All-Pac-10 (1991)

Career AFL statistics
- TD–INT: 303–45
- Passing yards: 16,673
- Passer rating: 118.98
- Stats at ArenaFan.com

Mike Pawlawski (born July 18, 1969) is an American former professional football player who was a quarterback in the National Football League (NFL), Arena Football League (AFL), and XFL. He played college football for the California Golden Bears.

== Early life and college ==
Born in Los Angeles, Pawlawski attended the University of California, Berkeley. Pawlawski was the backup quarterback to Troy Taylor his freshman and sophomore seasons. In 1990, he became the starting quarterback and led the Golden Bears to a bowl game victory. As a senior, he led the Golden Bears to a 10–2 record and a No. 8 national ranking in 1991. For his play, he was named first-team all-conference and Pac-10 conference offensive player of the year.

== Professional career ==
=== Tampa Bay Buccaneers ===
He was selected by the Tampa Bay Buccaneers in the eighth round of the 1992 NFL draft, playing one season for the team while mostly on injured reserve.

=== Baltimore Stallions ===
On March 13, 1994, Pawlawski signed with the Baltimore Stallions of the Canadian Football League (CFL). He was later released and did not appear in a regular season game.

=== Miami Hooters ===
In 1995, Pawlawski signed with the Miami Hooters of the Arena Football League (AFL) for its inaugural season. He began the year as the team’s starting quarterback but was later benched in favor of Matt Vogler. Pawlawski completed 66 of 133 passes for six touchdowns and five interceptions over five games. He was released following the team’s fifth game on June 15, 1995.

=== San Jose SaberCats ===
Pawlawski finished the 1995 season with the San Jose SaberCats. He was signed to be the backup to Tony Kimbrough and recorded one rushing touchdown during the regular season. In the playoffs against the Orlando Predators, Pawlawski replaced Kimbrough in the second half where he completed 12-of-23 passes for 163 yards and three touchdowns in the loss.

=== Shreveport Pirates ===
Following the completion of the SaberCats season, Pawlawski signed with the Shreveport Pirates of the Canadian Football League (CFL). He dressed for ten games, completing one of four passes for 12 yards and rushing five times for 24 yards. His only passing statistics came in Week 12 against the Baltimore Stallions, when he entered the game in relief of Billy Joe Tolliver, who had suffered a broken pinky.

=== Albany Firebirds ===
In 1996, Pawlawski signed with the Albany Firebirds. He was the backup quarterback to Mike Perez during his first season. In 1996, Pawlawski completed a career high 69% of his passes for 4,272 yards and 69 touchdowns. In 1997, Pawlawski led the Firebirds to a playoff appearance and threw 74 touchdowns. In 1999, Pawlawski led the Firebirds to a ArenaBowl XIII victory over the Orlando Predators. During that season he threw a career high 79 touchdowns and was named first team All-Arena team. In his final season with Albany, Pawlawski threw 70 touchdowns and led the Firebirds to their third consecutive playoff appearance. Over five seasons he established several league records.

=== San Francisco Demons ===
On October 28, 2000, Pawlawski signed with the San Francisco Demons of the XFL. He won the starting quarterback competition against fellow California alumnus Pat Barnes. In the season debut against the Los Angeles Xtreme he completed 31-of-47 passes for 288 yards and two touchdowns. He led the Demons on a game winning field goal drive to defeat the Xtreme 15−13. In week four, Pawlawski sustained an injury against the Las Vegas Outlaws that forced him to miss the Birmingham, and NY/NJ games. Pawlawski returned in week seven against Chicago. In the season finale against Los Angeles, Pawlawski would injury his shoulder, which forced him to miss the playoff game against Orlando. He returned the following week in the league championship, but the Demons fell to the Xtreme. It was later revealed, however, that Pawlawski had played the season with a fractured vertebra in his neck. It ended his football career. On the season, Pawlawski appeared in eight regular season games (eight starts) and completed 186-of-297 passes for 1,659 yards and 12 touchdowns to six interceptions.

== Career statistics ==
Legend
**Bold**	Career high
	Led the league

=== AFL ===
Regular season

Year	Team	Games			Passing								Rushing			
Year	Team	GP	GS	Record	Cmp	Att	Pct	Yds	Y/A	TD	Int	Rtg	Att	Yds	Y/A	TD
1995	MIA	5	4	0–4	66	133	49.6	674	5.1	6	5	60.2	19	19	1.0	2
1995	SJ	4	0	—	0	0	0.0	0	0.0	0	0	0.0	1	2	2.0	1
1996	ALB	7	0	—	23	35	65.7	296	8.5	5	0	**127.8**	2	6	3.0	0
1997	ALB	**14**	**14**	6–8	**351**	**509**	**69.0**	**4,272**	8.4	69	14	117.0	**36**	**77**	2.1	**8**
1998	ALB	**14**	**14**	**10**–4	293	447	65.5	3,795	8.5	74	11	121.4	18	31	1.7	5
1999	ALB	13	13	**10**–3	294	442	66.5	3,864	**8.7**	**79**	7	126.9	7	31	**4.4**	2
2000	ALB	**14**	**14**	9–5	324	479	67.6	3,772	7.9	70	8	120.8	10	15	1.5	1
Career		71	59	35–24	1,351	2,045	66.1	16,673	8.2	303	45	119.0	93	181	1.9	19

=== XFL ===
Regular season

Year	Team	Games			Passing									Rushing				
Year	Team	GP	GS	Record	Cmp	Att	Pct	Yds	Y/A	Lng	TD	Int	Rtg	Att	Yds	Y/A	Lng	TD
2001	SF	8	8	4–4	186	297	62.6	1,659	5.6	35	12	6	82.6	24	42	1.8	18	0
Career		8	8	4–4	186	297	62.6	1,659	5.6	35	12	6	82.6	24	42	1.8	18	0

Postseason

Year	Team	Games			Passing									Rushing				
Year	Team	GP	GS	Record	Cmp	Att	Pct	Yds	Y/A	Lng	TD	Int	Rtg	Att	Yds	Y/A	Lng	TD
2001	SF	1	1	0–1	8	20	40.0	74	3.7	19	0	2	11.3	1	-1	-1.0	-1	0
Career		1	1	0–1	8	20	40.0	74	3.7	19	0	2	11.3	1	-1	-1.0	-1	0

=== College ===
Bowl games only began counting toward single-season and career statistics in 2002

- 1990 Copper Bowl − 15/26 for 172 yards with 1 touchdown, 1 interception. Named MVP.
- 1992 Florida Citrus Bowl − 21/32 for 230 yards with 1 touchdown. Named MVP.

Season	Team	Games			Passing								Rushing			
Season	Team	GP	GS	Record	Cmp	Att	Pct	Yds	Avg	TD	Int	Rtg	Att	Yds	Avg	TD
1988	California	11	0	—	6	13	46.2	124	9.5	0	0	126.3	2	7	3.5	0
1989	California	11	0	—	7	17	41.2	69	4.1	0	2	51.7	3	-1	-0.1	0
1990	California	12	12	7−4−1	179	299	59.9	2,069	6.9	17	13	128.1	54	-68	-1.3	3
1991	California	12	12	10−2	191	316	60.4	2,517	8.0	21	13	141.1	37	-66	-1.8	1
Career		46	24	17−6−1	383	645	59.4	4,779	7.4	38	28	132.4	96	-128	-1.3	4

== Personal life ==
Pawlawski has been the host of color Gridiron Outdoors on Outdoor Channel and is a radio color commentator for Cal football on KGO 810 and the Cal radio network. He also announced San Jose SaberCats and Bay Area Panthers games.
