= Aaron Garcia (American football) =

American football player and coach (born 1970)

No. 8
- Position: Quarterback

Personal information
- Born: October 28, 1970 (age 56); Sacramento, California, U.S.
- Listed height: 6 ft 1 in (1.85 m)
- Listed weight: 195 lb (88 kg)

Career information
- High school: Grant Union (Sacramento)
- College: Sacramento State
- NFL draft: 1994: undrafted

Career history

Playing
- Arizona Rattlers (1995); Connecticut Coyotes (1996); New Jersey Red Dogs (1997–1998); Iowa Barnstormers (1998–2000); Orlando Rage (2001)*; New York Dragons (2001); San Francisco 49ers (2002)*; New York Dragons (2002–2008); Jacksonville Sharks (2010–2011); San Antonio Talons (2012); San Jose SaberCats (2013); Orlando Predators (2013); Jacksonville Sharks (2014); Los Angeles KISS (2014)
- * Offseason or practice squad member only

Coaching
- Los Angeles Kiss (2014) Offensive coordinator; Las Vegas Outlaws (2015) Head coach

Awards and highlights
- ArenaBowl champion (2011); ArenaBowl MVP (2011); 2× AFL Offensive Player of the Year (2001, 2011); 3× First-team All-Arena (2000, 2001, 2011); 3× AFL passing touchdowns leader (2000, 2001, 2003); 2× AFL passing yards leader (2001, 2013); AFL's 20 Greatest Players #11 (2006); AFL's 25 Greatest Players #3 (2012)

Career AFL statistics
- Comp. / Att.: 4,963 / 7,794
- Passing yards: 62,159
- TD–INT: 1,336–229
- QB rating: 115.72
- Rushing TDs: 46
- Stats at ArenaFan.com

Head coaching record
- Regular season: 5–12–1 (.306)
- Postseason: 0–0 (–)
- Career: 5–12–1 (.306)

Aaron Garcia (born October 28, 1970) is an American former professional football quarterback who played 19 seasons in the Arena Football League (AFL) from 1995 to 2014. Born in Sacramento, California, Garcia attended high school in Sacramento at Grant Union High School. After graduation from high school in 1988, Garcia enrolled at Washington State University and played quarterback for the Cougars, starting for two seasons. He transferred to California State University, Sacramento in 1992, where he started for two seasons.

Garcia signed with the Arizona Rattlers and became their starting quarterback in 1995. In his career, Garcia also played for the Connecticut Coyotes, New Jersey Red Dogs, Iowa Barnstormers, New York Dragons, Jacksonville Sharks, San Antonio Talons, San Jose SaberCats, Orlando Predators, and Los Angeles KISS. Garcia set AFL career records for passing yards, passing touchdowns, and interceptions, winning ArenaBowl XXIV while a member of the Sharks. Garcia was also a two-time AFL Offensive Player of the Year Award recipient, in 2001 and 2011. Garcia was the head coach of the AFL's Las Vegas Outlaws in 2015.

== Early life ==
Garcia attended Grant Union High School where he played high school football, and basketball with his father as coach, where he broke John Elway’s California state high school passing, yardage and touchdown records with a two-year prep total of 5,800 yards and 57 touchdown passes.

== College career ==
Garcia first played college football for the Washington State Cougars of Washington State University. He was redshirted in 1988. He started as a redshirt freshman in 1989, contributing 1,591 yards and 11 touchdown passes, leading the Pac-10 in passing efficiency that year. During that year, quarterbacking duties also were shared by junior Brad Gossen, who threw for 1,372 yards and nine touchdowns in an injury shortened season, prior to Garcia being named the starter. In 1990, a mid-season quarterback controversy erupted when second-year coach Mike Price benched veterans Gossen and Garcia in favor of true-freshman Drew Bledsoe.

After Bledsoe's emergence at Washington State in 1990, Garcia transferred to Sacramento State in Division I-AA and finished his college football career as the starter there, throwing for 1,796 yards and 13 touchdowns in his senior season.

== Professional career ==
=== Arizona Rattlers ===
Following his college career, Garcia turned to arena football. He played for the Arizona Rattlers of the Arena Football League (AFL) in 1995.

=== Connecticut Coyotes ===
Garcia was traded to the Connecticut Coyotes during the 1996 season.

=== New Jersey Red Dogs ===
Garcia would change teams again in 1997, playing for the New Jersey Red Dogs from 1997 to 1998.

=== Iowa Barnstomers ===
In early June 1998, Garcia was traded to the Iowa Barnstormers for Chris Spencer and future considerations. Garcia finished the 1998 season with the Barnstormers and also played for them from 1999 to 2000. He was named first-team All-Arena for the 2000 season after leading the league in touchdown passes.

=== Orlando Rage ===
In late 2000, Garcia signed with the Orlando Rage of the XFL for the 2001 season. However, he was released before the season started.

=== New York Dragons (first stint) ===
The Barnstormers became the New York Dragons in 2001. Garcia signed a three-year deal worth $150,000.00 per year to remain with the Dragons. In the 2001 season, Garcia threw a league record 104 touchdown passes, but this was passed by Clint Dolezel in 2006. Garcia earned first-team All-Arena and AFL Offensive Player of the Year honors for the 2001 season. Garcia also led the AFL in passing yards that year.

=== San Francisco 49ers ===
Garcia briefly left the AFL in 2002, when he was signed by the NFL's San Francisco 49ers. He was released after minicamp in June and returned to the Dragons, who finished 3–11 that year.

=== New York Dragons (second stint) ===
Garcia led the AFL in passing touchdowns in 2003. On February 26, 2006, he suffered a fractured tibia and fibula, ending his season. He was replaced by Juston Wood and later Nick Browder. At the time of the injury, Garcia had thrown more touchdown passes than any pro quarterback, however, Andy Kelly and Clint Dolezel moved ahead of Garcia while he was injured.

On June 2, 2007, Garcia became the fourth quarterback in AFL history to throw 800 touchdowns, joining Dolezel, Sherdrick Bonner, and Kelly.

In 2008, Garcia led the Dragons to the playoffs despite finishing the season with an 8–8 record. In the first round playoff game, Garcia and the Dragons defeated a heavily favored Dallas Desperados team who finished the year at 12–4. Garcia and Dolezel squared off at quarterback against each other, and Garcia out dueled Dolezel throwing nine touchdown passes to Dolezel's seven. The following week, New York lost on the final play of the game to the Philadelphia Soul, who would go on to win ArenaBowl XXII.

=== Jacksonville Sharks (first stint) ===
The AFL suspended operations in 2009. On January 21, 2010, Garcia signed with the expansion Jacksonville Sharks when the AFL reformed in 2010. On May 1, 2010, Garcia threw his 900th touchdown pass to Sale' Key in a 62–60 win over the Tulsa Talons. On June 5, 2010, Garcia became the all-time leader in passing touchdowns in Arena Football history, with 932 touchdown passes thrown. On April 30, 2011, Garcia connected with Jeron Harvey for his 1,000th career touchdown pass. Jacksonville Sharks went on to beat in-state rival Orlando Predators 76–55. On July 22, 2011, Garcia became the first AFL quarterback to cross the 50,000 yard milestone in a 75–56 victory over the Spokane Shock. On August 12, 2011, with two seconds remaining in the 4th quarter, Garcia threw the winning touchdown pass as time expired in ArenaBowl XXIV to win his first ArenaBowl title for the Jacksonville Sharks. Garcia garnered AFL Offensive Player of the Year and first-team All-Arena recognition for his performance during the 2011 season.

=== San Antonio Talons ===
On September 27, 2011, Garcia was officially announced as the first player to sign with the relocated San Antonio Talons franchise. On March 29, 2012, Garcia was strip sacked on the six yard line but was able to recover the ball and go into the end zone for a fumble recovery score in a 47–34 road victory over the Orlando Predators. Garcia lead the Talons to a 14–4 record, and a Central Division Championship. With the top seed in the National Conference, the Talons were upset 35–34 by the Utah Blaze after Garcia was sacked on 4th and goal with 2:50 remaining in the game. After the 2012 season, the Talons offered a contract to Garcia, but Garcia decided to sign elsewhere.

=== San Jose SaberCats ===
On November 8, 2012, Garcia signed with the San Jose SaberCats. On April 22, 2013, after a slow start to the 2013 season (98 for 159, 24 TD's and 13 INT's) the SaberCats announced that they have been assigned former Chicago Rush quarterback Russ Michna on a two-year contract. The SaberCats then placed Garcia on recallable reassignment to make room on the 24-man roster.

=== Orlando Predators ===
On April 25, 2013, Garcia was traded, along with Devin Clark, to the Orlando Predators in exchange for Amarri Jackson. He led the AFL in passing yards in 2013.

=== Jacksonville Sharks (second stint) ===
On February 8, 2014, Garcia was traded back to Jacksonville for Bernard Morris, Matt Marcorelle and Trevis Turner. Garcia started one game for the Sharks, while refusing to report for most of the season.

=== Los Angeles KISS ===
On May 12, 2014, Garcia was traded to the Los Angeles KISS for J. J. Raterink.

== Coaching career ==
Garcia was named head coach of the Las Vegas Outlaws of the AFL in September 2014. The Outlaws folded in August 2015.

== Career statistics ==
Legend
	AFL Offensive Player of the Year
	Won the ArenaBowl
	AFL record
	Led the league
**Bold**	Career high

=== Playing career ===
==== AFL ====
Year	Team	Passing							Rushing		
Year	Team	Cmp	Att	Pct	Yds	TD	Int	Rtg	Att	Yds	TD
1995	Arizona	175	284	61.6	2,416	43	8	114.99	15	44	0
1996	Connecticut	136	271	50.2	1,779	31	4	93.70	12	17	3
1997	New Jersey	76	138	55.1	950	16	7	84.51	14	19	2
1998	New Jersey	91	140	65.0	1,158	18	5	107.98	19	94	8
1998	Iowa	200	343	58.3	2,457	43	9	100.93	20	23	7
1999	Iowa	283	468	60.5	3,815	68	15	109.41	**53**	**115**	**15**
2000	Iowa	270	466	57.9	4,026	92	8	118.79	13	18	0
2001	New York	368	529	69.6	4,515	104	16	122.60	9	32	2
2002	New York	112	188	59.6	1,390	29	9	101.15	11	34	0
2003	New York	329	513	64.1	4,279	100	10	121.74	11	33	1
2004	New York	279	459	60.8	3,797	91	13	114.99	14	13	4
2005	New York	345	516	66.7	4,112	90	13	120.09	8	−11	0
2006	New York	121	157	**77.1**	1,417	32	4	**132.88**	5	12	0
2007	New York	149	227	65.6	1,724	46	4	120.67	0	0	0
2008	New York	336	500	67.2	3,533	78	9	119.03	7	6	2
2010	Jacksonville	312	486	64.2	3,718	82	16	113.32	9	−29	1
2011	Jacksonville	402	562	71.5	4,933	116	17	125.24	4	24	1
2012	San Antonio	405	610	66.4	4,985	**118**	16	120.12	10	8	0
2013	San Jose	**98**	**159**	61.6	**1,154**	24	**13**	87.36	0	0	0
2013	Orlando	**317**	**488**	65.0	**4,015**	84	**15**	117.27	2	−1	0
2014	Jacksonville	27	42	64.3	277	6	1	108.93	0	0	0
2014	Los Angeles	132	248	53.2	1,709	26	17	72.80	3	0	0
Career		4,963	7,794	63.7	62,159	1,336	229	115.72	239	451	46

==== College ====
Year	Passing							Rushing			
Year	Comp	Att	Yards	Pct.	TD	Int	QB rating	Att	Yards	Avg	TD
Washington State Cougars
1989	115	189	1,591	60.8	11	11	139.1	52	8	0.2	0
1990	17	41	236	41.5	1	5	73.5	13	11	0.8	0
Sacramento State Hornets
1992	41	73	672	56.2	6	2	155.1	27	−83	−3.1	0
1993	137	253	1,796	54.2	13	16	118.1	48	−68	−1.4	0
Career	310	556	4,295	55.8	31	34	126.8	140	-132	-0.9	0

=== Head coaching record ===
Team	Year	Regular season					Postseason				
Team	Year	Won	Lost	Tie	Win %	Finish	Won	Lost	Tie	Win %	Result
LV	2015	5	12	1	.306	**2nd in West**	–	–	–	–	–
Total		5	12	1	.306		–	–	–	–	–
