= Herb Coleman (defensive lineman) =

American gridiron football player (born 1971)

No. 95
- Position: Defensive lineman

Personal information
- Born: September 4, 1971 (age 55); Chicago, Illinois, U.S.
- Listed height: 6 ft 4 in (1.93 m)
- Listed weight: 285 lb (129 kg)

Career information
- High school: Country Club Hills (IL) Hillcrest
- College: Trinity International
- NFL draft: 1995: 7th round, 238th overall pick

Career history
- San Francisco 49ers (1995)*; Kansas City Chiefs (1996)*; New Orleans Saints (1996)*; San Francisco 49ers (1997)*; Rhein Fire (1997); Milwaukee Mustangs (1998–1999); Saskatchewan Roughriders (1998); Denver Broncos (1999)*; Orlando Predators (1999); Milwaukee Mustangs (1999–2000); Colorado Crush (2002–2004)
- * Offseason or practice squad member only
- Stats at ArenaFan.com

Herbert Coleman (born September 4, 1971) is an American former professional football defensive lineman. He was selected by the San Francisco 49ers of the National Football League (NFL) in the seventh round of the 1995 NFL draft after playing college football at Trinity International University. Coleman was also a member of the Kansas City Chiefs, New Orleans Saints, and Denver Broncos of the NFL, the Rhein Fire of NFL Europe, the Milwaukee Mustangs, Orlando Predators, and Colorado Crush of the Arena Football League (AFL), and the Saskatchewan Roughriders of the Canadian Football League (CFL).

== Early life ==
Coleman attended Hillcrest High School in Country Club Hills, Illinois.

== College career ==
Coleman played for the Trinity International Trojans from 1989 to 1990. He then transferred to South Suburban College to improve his grades while also working at a post office. He later returned to Trinity International to finish his college education, while playing for the Trojans.

== Professional career ==
Coleman was selected by the San Francisco 49ers in the seventh round with the 238th overall pick in the 1995 NFL draft and signed with the team on June 29, 1995. He was released by the 49ers on August 20 and signed to the team's practice squad on August 28, 1995. He was released by the 49ers on August 20, 1996. On August 27, 1996, Coleman was signed to the practice squad of the Kansas City Chiefs of the NFL. On December 4, 1996, he was signed to the practice squad of the New Orleans Saints of the NFL. He signed with the San Francisco 49ers on January 24, 1997. Coleman played for the Rhein Fire of the World League of American Football during the 1997 season. He was released by the 49ers on August 19, 1997. He was signed by the Milwaukee Mustangs of the Arena Football League (AFL) on January 9, 1998. Coleman was placed on Other League Exempt by the Mustangs on January 23, 1998, upon joining the CFL's Saskatchewan Roughriders. He signed with the Roughriders in 1998 and played in two games, starting both, for the team during the 1998 season. He was placed on Other League Exempt by the Mustangs on March 10, 1999, upon joining the Denver Broncos of the NFL. Coleman was signed by the Broncos in March 1999. He was released by the Broncos on August 10, 1999. The Milwaukee Mustangs traded his rights to the Orlando Predators for Chris Barber on April 1, 1999. The Predators traded Coleman and Alvin Ashley to the Mustangs for Ernest Allen on November 4, 1999. Herb played for the Mustangs during the 2000 season. He signed with the AFL's Colorado Crush on November 22, 2002, and played for the team during the 2003 season. He was placed on the refused to report list on January 12, 2004, and released by the Crush on November 15, 2004.
