= Darryl Hammond =

American football player (1967–2017)

No. 7
- Position: Wide receiver / Defensive back

Personal information
- Born: September 24, 1967; Tappahannock, Virginia, U.S.
- Died: February 19, 2017 (aged 49)
- Listed height: 6 ft 4 in (1.93 m)
- Listed weight: 225 lb (102 kg)

Career information
- High school: Essex
- College: Virginia
- NFL draft: 1988: undrafted

Career history
- New Orleans Saints (1989)*; New York Jets (1990)*; Albany Firebirds (1991–1994); St. Louis Stampede (1995–1996); Nashville Kats (1997–2001); Georgia Force (2002–2003); Austin Wranglers (2004); Nashville Kats (2005–2006)
- * Offseason or practice squad member only

Awards and highlights
- 3× First Team All-Arena (1995, 1996, 1999); 4× All-Ironman Team (2000, 2001, 2003, 2005); AFL's 25 Greatest Players #19; Arena Football Hall of Fame inductee (2013)

Career AFL statistics
- Receptions: 802
- Receiving yards / avg.: 8,559 / 10.7
- Receiving TDs: 144
- Tackles: 728
- Interceptions: 31
- Stats at ArenaFan.com

Darryl Hammond (September 24, 1967 – February 19, 2017) was an American arena football wide receiver / defensive back in the Arena Football League (AFL).

Hammond is ranked in the top 20 in numerous career record books. His sixteen-year career is currently the longest career in Arena Football League history. His 8,559 receiving yards are sixteenth-most in Arena football history and his 802 receptions rank 10th, and 144 touchdown receptions rank 20th in league history. His 728 career tackles rank second, and his 31 career interceptions are tied for 20th in league history as well. He was named as one of the 25 greatest players in Arena football history on the list compiled in 2012 as part of the league's 25th anniversary celebration.

== High school and college ==
Hammond was an All-State player football player at Essex High School. He then attended Ferrum College for his freshman and sophomore years. He then transferred to the University of Virginia, where he was the team's leading receiver in 1985. He recorded 11 receptions for 115 yards and one touchdown in 1986. He was switched from wide receiver to strong safety for his senior season in 1987, and he recorded 61 tackles and earned honorable All-ACC mention honors.

== Professional career ==
=== National Football League (1989–1990) ===
Hammond went unselected in the 1988 NFL draft and worked at a Ben & Jerry's plant while completing his Sociology degree. He also spent time working as a deputy sheriff in Manassas, Virginia. He then spent two years as a graduate assistant at Penn State under head coach Joe Paterno where he completed his degree in Turf management.

In 1989, he was invited to the New Orleans Saints' training camp as a free agent, but released before the season began. The following year, he signed with the New York Jets. However, the night before his flight to camp, he decided he was too "burned out" to focus on football and did not attend.

=== Arena Football League (1991–2006) ===
==== Albany Firebirds (1991–1994) ====
Hammond joined the Albany Firebirds of the Arena Football League in 1991, and recorded five interceptions, which ranked him second in the league. He was also the Firebirds second-leading tackler, with 48 tackles, and he broke up 11 passes. He also ranked second among Firebird receivers with 27 receptions for 254 yards and seven touchdowns. He also was 1-of-1 passing the ball, a 27-yard completion. He also returned two kickoffs for a total of 39 yards.

In 1992, Hammond ranked fourth in the league with 60 total tackles. He recorded two interceptions and four passes broken up. He also recorded 13 receptions for 138 yards, and one touchdown. Once again he was 1-of-1 passing a 26-yard touchdown.

In 1993, Hammond was Albany's second-leading tackler, recording 65 tackles and 1.5 sacks. He had two interceptions and eight passes broken up. He recorded 35 receptions for 454 yards and six touchdowns. He also recorded 12 total return yards on both a missed field goal and a kickoff.

In 1994 Hammond ranked fifth among Albany receivers with 10 receptions for 101 yards and two touchdowns. He finished as the team's fifth-leading tackler, recording 35 total tackles. He was also second on the team with three interceptions.

==== St. Louis Stampede (1995–1996) ====
In 1995, Hammond joined the St. Louis Stampede and was a First-team All-Arena selection. He led St. Louis with 80 receptions for 979 yards, and 12 touchdowns. He also had 11 carries for a career-high 36 yards and three touchdowns. He also recorded 49 tackles, four interceptions one sack, four passes broken up and a fumble recovery.

In 1996, Hammond was a First-team All-Arena selection for the second time, after leading the Stampede 74 receptions for 860 yards, and 16 touchdowns. He also recorded 60 tackles and two interceptions, seven passes broken up and two fumble recoveries. He also returned one kickoff for 17 yards and a missed field goal for five yards. He also carried the ball four times for 21 yards.

==== Nashville Kats (1997–2001) ====
In 1997, Hammond joined the expansion Nashville Kats and was the team's second-leading receiver, recording 50 receptions for 607 yards and four touchdowns. He also recorded 49 tackles, one sack, two interceptions, a pass broken up, and a fumble recovery. He also caught two two-point conversions, returned 15 kickoffs for 205 yards and two missed field goals for 23 yards. He tied a career-best with seven tackles in opening win against the San Jose SaberCats. He won his first Ironman of the Game award with Nashville, catching seven passes for 77 yards, making five tackles, a pass break up and one interception in a home win over the New York Dragons.

In 1998, Hammond recorded 31 receptions for 292 yards and seven touchdowns, despite missing six weeks with an injury. He recorded 22 tackles, two broken up passes and two fumble recoveries. He was named Ironman of the Game twice for the season, as well as the Dick Butkus Football Network Defensive Player of the Week twice. He was placed on injured reserve on June 4, and in his first game back, against the Tampa Bay Storm, he recorded four receptions for 32 yards, for one touchdown. He also recorded one fumble recovery, on a kickoff, for a touchdown, and two tackles.

In 1999, Hammond was an All-Arena Team selection for the third time, and chosen as Nashville's co-Ironman of the Year, an award he shared with James Baron. He recorded a career-high 88 receptions for 788 yards and 19 touchdowns. He carries the ball 14 times for 31 yards and four touchdowns. He finished second on the team in tackles, yet he recorded a career-high with 61. In the last seven games of the season he recorded 65 receptions for 570 yards and 15 touchdowns. He also recorded one interception, two fumble recoveries, and three passes broken up.

In 2000 Hammond was an All-Ironman Team. He finished tied for the team lead with 71 total tackles. He ranked second in the league with five fumble recoveries. He finished as the team's second-leading receiver with 55 receptions for 581 yards and nine touchdowns. He had 10 carries for a career-high 52 yards, and one touchdown. He had five kickoffs returns for 56 yards and, two missed field goals returns for 43 yards, and two interceptions for 50 yards. The Kats made their way through the playoff and to ArenaBowl XIV in Orlando, where he recorded three receptions, for 88 yards, two touchdowns, and two tackles.

In 2001, Hammond statistically had one of the best seasons of his career. He led the Kats with 60 receptions for 708 yards and 10 touchdowns. He recorded 36 tackles, and two interceptions, despite missing two late season games due to injury. He was named to the All-Time All-Ironman team for the second time in his career. The Kats once again made their way to the ArenaBowl. In ArenaBowl XV in Grand Rapids he recorded one receptions for 11 yards, 2.5 tackles, and one pass broken up.

==== Georgia Force (2002–2003) ====
In 2002, the Nashville Kats moved to Atlanta, Georgia, and were renamed the Georgia Force, similar to the Cleveland Browns/Baltimore Ravens move of 1996, whereas Nashville retained the Kats' name, colors, logo, and history.

With the start of the season, Hammond tied the league career record for longest AFL career, at the time it was shared between himself, Sylvester Bembery (1988–2000) and George LaFrance (1988–2000). He finished third on the team with 50 tackles, and had two interceptions. He also led the team with 65 receptions for 620 yards and nine touchdowns.

In 2003, Hammond led the team in receptions with 88 for 969 yards, and a career-high 20 touchdowns. He finished fourth on the team in rushing with three carries for 22 yards and one touchdown. On defense, he recorded 33.5 total tackles, three for a loss, three forced fumbles, one fumble recovery, and two interceptions for 13 yards.

==== Austin Wranglers (2004) ====
In 2004, Hammond recorded 47 receptions for 427 yards and 12 touchdowns in his only season with the Austin Wranglers. He recorded 25 tackles and three fumble recoveries. He also carried the ball nine times for 14 yards and a touchdown. He also earned Army Ironman of the Game honors twice. He was Injured early in the season and spent four weeks on injured reserve.

==== Nashville Kats (2005–2006) ====
In 2005, Hammond rejoined the reborn Nashville Kats for his final two seasons as a player. In his 15th season, he was named to the league's All-Ironman team. He finished as the Kats’ second-leading receiver, recording 66 receptions for 632 yards and eight touchdowns. He also had seven carries for 10 yards and one touchdown. He also finished with 42.5 tackles, one tackle for loss, two interceptions and a fumble recovery.

In 2006, Hammond recorded 21 tackles, one sack, two passes broken up, one fumble recovery, and two interceptions, one for a touchdown. He also recorded 13 receptions for 149 yards, and two touchdowns. He also carried the ball seven times for 10 yards and three touchdowns and had three kickoff returns for nine yards.

== Outside of football ==
Hammond was an avid golfer. Also, in 2004, he was Michael Irvin's stunt double on the set of the Adam Sandler movie The Longest Yard, and played Philadelphia Eagles wide receiver Harold Carmichael in the Mark Wahlberg film, Invincible. He was the volleyball coach in Hannah Montana – The Movie (2009); he also served as an assistant football coach at The Ensworth School in Nashville in the fall of 2005.

Hammond served as a STARS counselor as well as an assistant football coach for the Independence High School football team in Thompsons Station, Tennessee

== Personal life ==
Darryl Hammond died from Lou Gehrig's disease on February 19, 2017. He was one of at least 345 former NFL players to be diagnosed after death with chronic traumatic encephalopathy (CTE), which is caused by repeated hits to the head. He had a wife, Robin, and three children: two daughters, Darryn and Sydney, and a son, Todd.
