= Mike Wilpolt =

American football player and coach (born 1968)

Profile
- Position: Wide receiver/defensive back

Personal information
- Born: January 4, 1968 (age 58); Broomfield, Colorado, U.S.
- Listed height: 5 ft 9 in (1.75 m)
- Listed weight: 165 lb (75 kg)

Career information
- College: Mesa State (CO)
- NFL draft: 1992: undrafted

Career history

Playing
- Charlotte Rage (1992); Las Vegas Sting (1994–1995); Anaheim Piranhas (1996)

Coaching
- Mesa State (CO) (DB) (1998); Albany Firebirds (STC) (1999–2000); Indiana Firebirds (DB/DC/HC) (2001–2004); Los Angeles Avengers (DC) (2005–2007); Cleveland Gladiators (HC) (2008)

Awards and highlights
- 2× All-Rocky Mountain Conference (1990, 1991); NAIA All-American (1991); ArenaBowl champion (1999); AFL Coach of the Year (2008)

Career AFL statistics
- Tackles: 179
- Interceptions: 6
- Receptions: 33
- Receiving yards: 315
- Receiving TDs: 2
- Stats at ArenaFan.com

Head coaching record
- Regular season: 17–10 (.630)
- Postseason: 2–1 (.667)
- Career: 19–11 (.633)

Mike Wilpolt (born January 4, 1968) is an American former football wide receiver/defensive back for the Charlotte Rage (1992–1993), the Las Vegas Sting (1994–1995), and the Anaheim Piranhas (1996) in the Arena Football League (AFL). He also coached for 10 years in the AFL with the Indiana Firebirds, Los Angeles Avengers and Cleveland Gladiators.

== Professional career ==
Key: Rec – receptions; Yards – Yards gained through receptions; TD – receiving touchdowns

Year	Team	Rec	Yards	TD
1992	Charlotte Rage	11	119	1
1994	Las Vegas Sting	19	170	1
1996	Anaheim Piranhas	3	26	0
Career		33	315	2

== Coaching career ==
=== Albany Firebirds ===
Wilpolt was the special teams coordinator for the Albany Firebirds, helping them win Back-to-Back Eastern Division Titles in 1999–2000. Wilpolt helped lead the Firebirds to the 1999 AFL World Championship, winning Arena Bowl XIII.

=== Indiana Firebirds ===
Wilpolt was the head coach in 2004 for the Indiana Firebirds. He took over the Firebirds after Steve DeBerg was fired after an 0–5 start to the season. Wilpolt led the Firebirds to eight wins in their last 11 games and were favored by many to win the 2005 championship, but the Firebirds folded before the 2005 season started due to an ownership dispute.

=== Los Angeles Avengers ===
Wilpolt was signed by the Los Angeles Avengers as the team's defensive coordinator in 2005. Over the course of the next 3 seasons, Wilpolt's defense has been in the top 5 twice and the top 10 all three years. He left the Avengers on October 10, 2007, when he was named the new head coach of the Las Vegas Gladiators who then relocated to Cleveland, Ohio.

=== Cleveland Gladiators ===
In week 1, Wilpolt coached the Gladiators to a 61–49 victory against the New York Dragons in his first game as the team's head coach. After their stunning victory over New York, Wilpolt led his team to a 66–63 victory over the Utah Blaze. The following week, the Gladiators defeated the defending National Conference Champion Columbus Destroyers 66–63. After losing three consecutive games, the Gladiators defeated the Los Angeles Avengers 83–69. In just seven games, Wilpolt had doubled the number of wins the Gladiators had in 2007. Wilpolt finished the regular season with a 9–7 record, and a 2–1 record in the playoffs, helping them reach the AFL National Conference Championship Game.

=== Career win–loss record ===
Key: W: Wins; L: Losses; Div: Division W-L; Conf: Conference W-L; N/C: Non-conference W-L; Home: Home W-L; Road: Road W-L; PS: Points for; PA: Points against

Year	Team	W	L	Div	Conf	N/C	Home	Road	PF	PA
2004	Indiana	8	3	5–1	5–3	3–0	5–1	3–2	604	515
2008	Cleveland	9	7	4–4	2–2	1–1	2–1	1–2	327	359
Career		17	10	9–5	7–5	4–1	7–2	4–4	931	874
