= Eddie Brown (arena football) =

American football player and coach (born 1969)

No. 17
- Position: Offensive specialist

Personal information
- Born: October 2, 1969 (age 57); Miami, Florida, U.S.
- Listed height: 5 ft 11 in (1.80 m)
- Listed weight: 192 lb (87 kg)

Career information
- College: Louisiana Tech
- NFL draft: 1991: undrafted

Career history

Playing
- Phoenix Cardinals (1991–1992)*; Albany/Indiana Firebirds (1994–2003)
- * Offseason or practice squad member only

Coaching
- Tamarac (NY) HS (basketball coach); Shaker HS (JV WR); Ben Davis HS (WR) (2006); Fort Wayne Fusion (2007); Wabash (assistant) (2007–2008); Fort Scott (assistant) (2009–2010); Wyandotte HS (2011–2014); Northwestern HS (2014); Boyd Anderson HS (2015–2016); Coral Springs HS (2023–2024); Miami Central (athletic director) (2024–present)

Awards and highlights
- ArenaBowl champion (1999); AFL MVP (1994); 2× AFL Offensive Player of the Year (1996, 1999); 3× First-team All-Arena (1994, 1996, 1999); Second-team All-Arena (1998); AFL 15th Anniversary Team (2001); AFL's 20 Greatest Players #1 (2006); AFL's 25 Greatest Players #2 (2012); Arena Football Hall of Fame inductee (2011); No. 17 jersey retired by Albany (2018)

Career AFL statistics
- Receptions: 950
- Rec. Yards: 12,736
- Rec. Touchdowns: 303
- Rush-Yards-TDs: 89-213-32
- KR-KR Yards-KR TDs: 166-2,756-9
- Stats at ArenaFan.com

Eddie Brown (born October 2, 1969), nicknamed "Touchdown", is an American former professional football offensive specialist who played for the Albany/Indiana Firebirds of the Arena Football League (AFL) from 1994 to 2003. He played college football at Louisiana Tech.

== Professional career ==
Brown played for the Albany Firebirds from 1994 until 2000, when he had to retire after the first game of the 2000 season due to the custody battle of his daughter. In his time in Albany, Eddie won ArenaBowl XIII in 1999 and won ArenaBowl MVP. He also won the AFL's Most Valuable Player award in 1994. Eddie unretired when the Firebirds franchise moved to Indianapolis, Indiana where he played for three more seasons until 2003, and retired in 2004 after being cut by the Firebirds. In January 2006, as the AFL celebrated its 20th anniversary, Brown was voted the best player in league history. On August 12, 2011, Brown was named as an inductee into the AFL Hall of Fame.

== Personal life ==
Brown is the father of NFL wide receiver Antonio Brown.
