= Mark Ricks (gridiron football) =

American gridiron football player (born 1970)

No. 28, 9, 17, 18, 14
- Position: Defensive back

Personal information
- Born: December 16, 1970 (age 55); Los Angeles, California, U.S.
- Listed height: 5 ft 10 in (1.78 m)
- Listed weight: 175 lb (79 kg)

Career information
- College: Western Michigan
- NFL draft: 1992: undrafted

Career history
- Saskatchewan Roughriders (1993); Toronto Argonauts (1993); Saskatchewan Roughriders (1994)*; Winnipeg Blue Bombers (1995); Ottawa Rough Riders (1995); St. Louis Stampede (1996); Nashville Kats (1997); Portland Forest Dragons/Oklahoma Wranglers (1998–2000); Los Angeles Avengers (2000–2002); Arizona Rattlers (2002–2003); Grand Rapids Rampage (2003–2004); New York Dragons (2006)
- * Offseason or practice squad member only

Awards and highlights
- First-team All-Arena (2001); Second-team All-Arena (1999)

Career AFL statistics
- Tackles: 486.5
- Interceptions: 45
- Pass breakups: 121
- Return yards: 3,641
- Totals TDs: 11
- Stats at ArenaFan.com

Mark L. Ricks (born December 16, 1970) is an American former professional football defensive back who played ten seasons in the Arena Football League (AFL) with the St. Louis Stampede, Nashville Kats, Portland Forest Dragons, Portland Forest Dragons/Oklahoma Wranglers, Los Angeles Avengers, Arizona Rattlers, Grand Rapids Rampage, and New York Dragons. He played college football at Western Michigan University. He was also a member of the Saskatchewan Roughriders, Toronto Argonauts, Winnipeg Blue Bombers, and Ottawa Rough Riders of the Canadian Football League (CFL).

== Early life ==
Mark L. Ricks was born on December 16, 1970, in Los Angeles. He was a two-year letterman for the Western Michigan Broncos of Western Michigan University from 1991 to 1992.

== Professional career ==
Ricks played for the Saskatchewan Roughriders of the Canadian Football League (CFL) in 1993.

Ricks also played for the Toronto Argonauts of the CFL in 1993.

Ricks was a member of the Roughriders during the 1994 off-season. He released by the Roughriders on July 2, 1994.

Ricks played for the CFL's Winnipeg Blue Bombers in 1995.

Ricks was signed by the Ottawa Rough Riders of the CFL on July 31, 1995.

Ricks played for the St. Louis Stampede of the Arena Football League (AFL) in 1996.

Ricks played for the Nashville Kats of the AFL in 1997.

Ricks played for the Portland Forest Dragons/Oklahoma Wranglers of the AFL from 1998 to 2000, earning second-team All-Arena honors in 1999. The Forest Dragons relocated to Oklahoma for the 2000 season.

Ricks was signed by the AFL's Los Angeles Avengers on November 2, 2000. He earned first-team All-Arena honors in 2001. He was released by the Avengers on December 11, 2002.

Ricks signed with the Arizona Rattlers of the AFL on December 31, 2002. He was released by the Rattlers on March 11, 2003.

Ricks played for the AFL's Grand Rapids Rampage from 2003 to 2004.

Ricks was signed by the New York Dragons of the AFL on March 7, 2006.
