= James Bowden (American football) =

American football player (born 1973)

No. 10
- Position: Wide receiver / Linebacker

Personal information
- Born: June 4, 1973 (age 53)
- Listed height: 5 ft 10 in (1.78 m)
- Listed weight: 185 lb (84 kg)

Career information
- College: North Carolina A&T (1991–1994)

Career history
- Baltimore Ravens (1996)*; New York CityHawks (1997–1998); New England Sea Wolves (1999); Tampa Bay Storm (2000–2001); New Jersey Gladiators (2002); Buffalo Destroyers (2003); Orlando Predators (2004)
- * Offseason or practice squad member only

Awards and highlights
- Second-team All-Arena (2001)

Career AFL statistics
- Receptions: 361
- Receiving yards: 4,454
- Tackles: 84
- Interceptions: 2
- Total TDs: 85
- Stats at ArenaFan.com

James Bowden (born June 4, 1973) is an American former professional football wide receiver who played eight seasons in the Arena Football League (AFL) with the New York CityHawks, New England Sea Wolves, Tampa Bay Storm, New Jersey Gladiators, Buffalo Destroyers and Orlando Predators. He played college football at North Carolina A&T State University. He was also a member of the Baltimore Ravens of the National Football League (NFL).

== Early life ==
James Bowden was born on June 4, 1973. He was a four-year letterman for the North Carolina A&T Aggies from 1991 to 1994.

== Professional career ==
Bowden signed with the NFL's Baltimore Ravens on July 19, 1996. He was released by the Ravens on August 19, 1996. He played for the New York CityHawks of the AFL from 1997 to 1998. Bowden played for the New England Sea Wolves of the AFL in 1999. He played for the AFL's Tampa Bay Storm from 2000 to 2001, earning Second-team All-Arena in 2001. He was traded to the New Jersey Gladiators on November 12, 2001. Bowden played for the team during the 2002 season. He signed with the Buffalo Destroyers of the AFL on March 6, 2003. He played for the AFL's Orlando Predators in 2004.
