= Tommy Jones (defensive back) =

American gridiron football player (born 1971)

Profile
- Position: Defensive back

Personal information
- Born: January 25, 1971 (age 55)
- Listed height: 6 ft 0 in (1.83 m)
- Listed weight: 190 lb (86 kg)

Career information
- College: Fresno State

Career history
- Saskatchewan Roughriders (1994); Amsterdam Admirals (1996–1997); Anaheim Piranhas (1996–1997); San Jose SaberCats (1998–2001)

Awards and highlights
- Second-team All-Arena (1998)

Career AFL statistics
- Tackles: 169.5
- Pass breakups: 46
- Interceptions: 19
- Receiving TDs: 2
- Fumble recoveries: 4
- Stats at ArenaFan.com

Thomas Jones (born January 25, 1971) is an American former professional football defensive back who played six seasons in the Arena Football League with the Anaheim Piranhas and San Jose SaberCats. He played college football at California State University, Fresno. Jones was also a member of the Saskatchewan Roughriders and Amsterdam Admirals. He is from Lemoore, California.
