= Clay Rush =

American football player (born 1973)

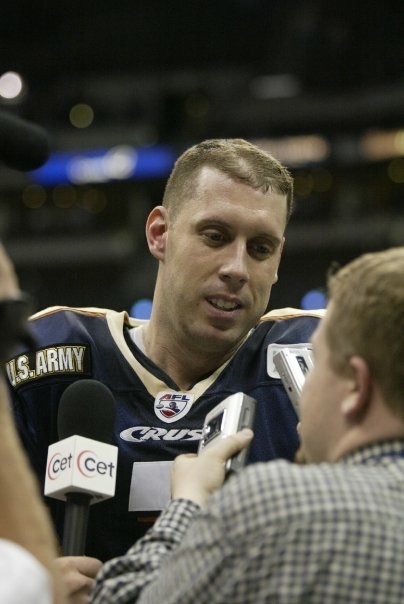
- Rush with the Colorado Crush in 2005

No. 3
- Position: Kicker

Personal information
- Born: October 27, 1973 (age 53); St. Louis, Missouri, U.S.
- Listed height: 6 ft 3 in (1.91 m)
- Listed weight: 220 lb (100 kg)

Career information
- High school: Riverview Gardens (St. Louis)
- College: Triton (1992); Harper (1993); Missouri Western (1994)

Career history
- Detroit Lions (1998)*; Shreveport Knights (1999); Iowa Barnstormers (1999); Atlanta Falcons (2000)*; Iowa Barnstormers (2000); Washington Redskins (2000)*; New York Dragons (2001–2002); Indiana Firebirds (2003); New York Jets (2003)*; Indiana Firebirds (2004); Colorado Crush (2005–2006); Kansas City Brigade (2007); Arizona Rattlers (2007); Colorado Crush (2008)
- * Offseason or practice squad member only

Awards and highlights
- ArenaBowl champion (2005); 2× First-team All-Arena (2000, 2003); 2× Second-team All-Arena (2005, 2006); 2× AFL Kicker of the Year (2000, 2003); Third-team All-American (1994)

Career AFL statistics
- Field goals made: 127 / 250 (50.8%)
- Extra points made: 798 / 911 (87.6%)
- Stats at ArenaFan.com

Clay Jackson Rush (born October 27, 1973) is an American former professional football kicker who played ten seasons in the Arena Football League (AFL) with the Iowa Barnstormers/New York Dragons, Indiana Firebirds, Colorado Crush, Kansas City Brigade, and Arizona Rattlers. He played college football at Triton College, Harper College, and Missouri Western State University, earning third-team All-American honors as a junior in 1994. After playing minor league football, Rush signed with the Detroit Lions of the National Football League (NFL) in 1998 but was later released before playing for them. He then played in the AFL from 1999 to 2008. He was named the AFL Kicker of the Year in both 2000 and 2003. Rush was also a four-time All-Arena selection. He made the game-winning kick as time expired in ArenaBowl XIX. He also had offseason stints in the NFL with the Atlanta Falcons, Washington Redskins, and New York Jets.

== Early life and college ==
Clay Jackson Rush was born on October 27, 1973, in St. Louis, Missouri. He played football, soccer, baseball, and basketball at Riverview Gardens High School in St. Louis. He began playing football his freshman year of high school.

Rush first played college football at Triton College in 1992 and at Harper College in 1993. He then transferred to play for the Missouri Western Griffons of Missouri Western State University in 1994. As a junior in 1994, he made a school record 12 field goals and also converted a school record 50-yard field goal. He was named an NCAA Division II third-team All-American for his performance during the 1994 season. Rush left the team after his junior year. He majored in exercise science at Missouri Western State.

== Professional career ==
In April 1998, Rush signed with the Detroit Lions of the National Football League (NFL). Prior to signing with the Lions, he had been playing with the minor league St. Louis Bulldogs. He was waived by the Lions in late July 1998. Rush then returned to play for the Bulldogs in August 1998.

Rush signed with the Shreveport Knights of the Regional Football League in May 1999, and played for them during the spring 1999 season. Through his first two games, he was perfect on extra points and had converted three of four field goals. Rush also punted for the Knights.

On June 24, 1999, Rush was signed by the Iowa Barnstormers of the Arena Football League (AFL) after the struggling Steve Opstad was released. On June 26, in his first game with the Barnstormers, he made a game-winning 21-yard field goal to help Iowa beat the Albany Firebirds by a score of 77–76. He played in five games for the Barnstormers during the 1999 AFL season, converting eight of nine field goals and 34 of 39 extra points.

Rush signed with the Atlanta Falcons of the NFL on February 12, 2000. He was allocated to play for the Scottish Claymores of NFL Europe. He was released by the Falcons on March 14, 2000. Rush had reportedly wanted to play for the Barnstormers instead of going to Europe. He played in all 14 games for the Barnstormers during the 2000 season, recording 16 of 28 field goals, 99 of 105 extra points, four solo tackles, one assisted tackle, and one fumble recovery as the Barnstormers finished the season with a 9–5 record. Rush set a team kicking record for total points that year and also made a Barnstormers-record 56-yard field goal. He led the league in field goal percentage (57.1%), extra points made (99), extra point percentage (94.3%), and kicking points (147). He was named first-team All-Arena and the AFL Kicker of the Year for his performance during the 2000 season. While with the Barnstormers, Rush revealed that his kicking strategy involved aiming for signs above the end zones. At one end of the field at Veterans Memorial Auditorium in Des Moines, Iowa, Rushed aimed for the "m" in "Family Zone" and at the other end of the field, he aimed between the "r" and "s" in "Barnstormers".

After the 2000 AFL season, Rush signed with the NFL's Washington Redskins on August 9, 2000, after Redskins kicker Brett Conway suffered a hamstring injury. Rush played in two preseason games for the Redskins as a kickoff specialist. Three of his seven kickoffs reached the end zone in his first game but none of them reached the end zone in his second game. He was released on August 21, 2000, after Conway returned from injury.

The Barnstormers moved to New York in 2001, becoming the New York Dragons. Rush appeared in all 14 games for the Dragons during the 2001 season, scoring 12 of 23 field goals and 110 of 118 extra points while also posting three solo tackles and two assisted tackles. His 110 extra points set a league record. On July 7, 2001, against the Carolina Cobras, Rush tied an AFL record with 13 extra points. He played in all 14 games for the third consecutive season in 2002, converting 22 of 43 field goals and 70 of 80 extra points while making five solo tackles.

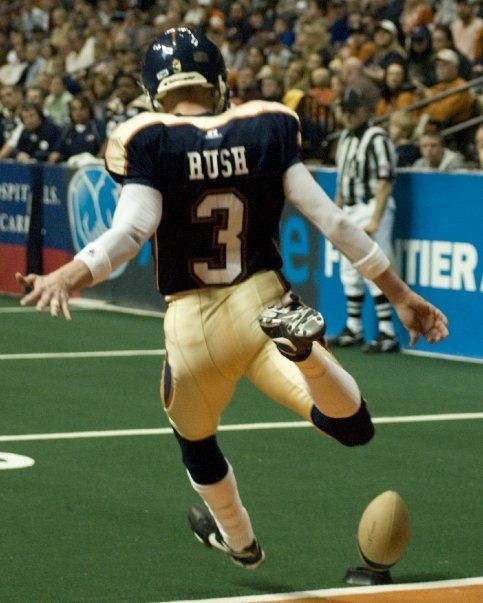
Rush kicking off in 2005

On November 11, 2002, Rush signed with the Indiana Firebirds of the AFL for the 2003 season. He had a workout with the Tampa Bay Buccaneers of the NFL in January 2003 but was not signed. On January 22, 2003, The Indianapolis Star noted that Rush's specialties were kicking the ball over the rebound net in order to prevent a return by the opposing team, and also kicking the ball high off of the net to try and cause a turnover. He played in all 16 games for the Firebirds in 2003, making 23 of 42 field goals and 83 of 100 extra points while also posting three solo tackles. He led the AFL with 23 field goals and 152 kicking points. Rush was named first-team All-Arena and AFL Kicker of the Year for the second time in his career. He also limited opposing teams to a 18.4 kickoff-return average, which was the third lowest in the AFL that year. Rush signed with the NFL's New York Jets on June 4, 2003, for the league minimum of $225,000. He shared kickoff duties with Danny Kight during the preseason. Rush was released by the Jets on August 12, 2003, after the second preseason game. Rush appeared in all 16 games for Indiana again in 2004, converting 15 of 36 field goals and 83 of 99 extra points while posting four solo tackles and leading the league with 47 touchbacks.

On October 15, 2004, Rush was signed by the AFL's Colorado Crush. He made a 62-yard field goal on February 27, 2005, which was the second longest in AFL history. He played in all 16 AFL games for the third straight season in 2005, making 14 of 31 field goals and 105 of 118 extra points while also leading the AFL in touchbacks again. He earning second-team All-Arena honors for the 2005 season. On June 12, 2005, in ArenaBowl XIX, Rush made a 20-yard game-winning field goal as time expired. The next year, he was placed on emergency hold on March 5, 2006, and placed on injured reserve the next day. He was activated from injured reserve on March 18, 2006. He appeared in 14 games during the 2006 season, converting seven of 12 field goals and 101 of 108 extra points, garnering second-team All-Arena recognition for the second consecutive season.

On October 12, 2006, Rush signed with the Kansas City Brigade of the AFL. He played in nine games for the Brigade during the 2007 season, recording two of eight field goals, 50 of 64 extra points, and three solo tackles. He was released on May 11, 2007, and replaced by Gary Kral, with head coach Kevin Porter stating, "We weren't getting production out of the position. But you can't completely fault Clay. It's hard to be a kicker in this league".

Rush then signed with the Arizona Rattlers of the AFL on May 15, 2007. He played in the final five games of the season for the Rattlers, converting four of eight field goals and 24 of 29 extra points.

Rush re-signed with the Crush on November 5, 2007. He made four of 10 field goals and 39 of 51 extra points during the 2008 season before being placed on injured reserve on April 30, 2008. The AFL folded after the 2008 season. Rush finished his AFL career with 127 field goals and 798 extra points, third most in league history (at the time) behind Steve Videtich and Remy Hamilton in both categories.

== Personal life ==
Rush also spent time as a youth and college kicking coach during his AFL career. On March 17, 2010, Rush filed a lawsuit alleging that he suffered permanent damage in 2008 after a Colorado Crush team doctor misevaluated Rush's concussion as a headache and allowed him to play after he had suffered hits to the head in several games. However, the team doctor denied these claims, stating that he told the Crush that Rush should not be allowed to play. In June 2012, a "seven-figure" settlement was reached between Rush and a Denver hospital.
