= Robert Stewart (lineman) =

American football player (1967–2022)

- Stewart with the New York Dragons

No. 77, 8
- Position: Offensive lineman / Defensive lineman

Personal information
- Born: April 12, 1967; Ashford, Alabama, U.S.
- Died: June 4, 2022 (aged 55); Charlotte, North Carolina, U.S.
- Listed height: 6 ft 0 in (1.83 m)
- Listed weight: 308 lb (140 kg)

Career information
- High school: Houston County (Columbia, Alabama)
- College: Alabama (1987–1988, 1990–1991)
- NFL draft: 1992: 8th round, 218th overall pick

Career history
- New Orleans Saints (1992)*; Hamilton Tiger-Cats (1993)*; Charlotte Rage (1994–1996); New Jersey Red Dogs (1997–2000); New York Dragons (2001–2002); Colorado Crush (2003)*; Arizona Rattlers (2003); Carolina Cobras (2003–2004)
- * Offseason or practice squad member only

Awards and highlights
- 3× First-team All-Arena (1994, 1999, 2001); 3× Second-team All-Arena (1995, 1997, 1998); AFL Lineman of the Year (1999); First-team All-American (1991); First-team All-SEC (1991); Second-team All-SEC (1990)

Career AFL statistics
- Tackles: 124.5
- Sacks: 38.5
- Forced fumbles: 7
- Touchdowns: 1
- Stats at ArenaFan.com

Robert Stewart (April 12, 1967 – June 4, 2022) was an American professional football lineman who played eleven seasons in the Arena Football League (AFL) with the Charlotte Rage, New Jersey Red Dogs, New York Dragons, Arizona Rattlers, and Carolina Cobras. He played college football at the University of Alabama, where he spent time at three different positions and was named an Associated Press second-team All-American. As a senior, Stewart was named a permanent team captain by the Alabama Crimson Tide: his hand and shoe prints are on the Walk of Fame at Denny Chimes tower. He was selected by the New Orleans Saints in the eighth round of the 1992 NFL draft but was released before the regular season. Stewart began his AFL career in 1994, earning first-team All-Arena honors as a rookie. He played in the AFL from 1994 to 2004, earning All-Arena honors six times and winning the Lineman of the Year award in 1999. He also set an AFL single-game record with four sacks in 2001.

== Early life ==
Robert Stewart was born on April 12, 1967, in Ashford, Alabama. He played high school football at Houston County High School in Columbia, Alabama. He was a four-year starter at fullback. Stewart led the state in rushing yards his junior year with 2,155. He only played in six games his senior year due to injury, rushing for 1,020 yards. He recorded high school totals of 759 carries for 4,471 yards (5.9 yards per carry) and 57 touchdowns. Stewart was considered one of the country's best fullback prospects in the class of 1986. On February 12, 1986, he committed to play college football for the Alabama Crimson Tide. Stewart graduated from high school in 1986.

== College career ==
Stewart could not play in 1986 due to academic issues and spent the season at the Tennessee Military Institute. He played linebacker for the Crimson Tide as a true freshman in 1987, earning Southeastern Conference (SEC) All-Freshman Team honors. He was moved to his high school position of fullback in 1988. Stewart started four games during the 1988 season, rushing 42 times for 135 yards and one touchdown while also catching eight passes for 52 yards and one touchdown.

On January 18, 1989, he was arrested and charged with breaking into a car on campus. The car's sunroof had been damaged and a jacket and sweatshirt were stolen. Before his arrest, Stewart had been expected to enter spring practices as a co-starter at fullback with Kevin Turner. On January 18, 1989, Stewart was suspended from the team indefinitely. On May 30, 1989, he pleaded guilty to automobile burglary and was given a year's suspended sentence, two years of probation, and 60 hours of community service. Alabama head coach Bill Curry said "Stewart will not participate in football during the 1989 season. He will remain in school, and at the end of the season I will evaluate him and see where we go from there." Stewart returned to the team in 1990 and moved to the defensive line, where he garnered Associated Press (AP) second-team All-SEC recognition. He posted 59 tackles and six sacks as a senior in 1991, earning AP first-team All-SEC and second-team All-American honors. He was also named a first-team All-American by United Press International.

Overall, he was a letterman in 1987, 1988, 1990, and 1991. At the conclusion of his college career, Stewart was named a permanent team captain with his hand and shoe prints placed on the Walk of Fame at Denny Chimes tower. In 2022, AL.com called Stewart one of the strongest players in Crimson Tide history. He majored in sport fitness management at Alabama.

== Professional career ==
=== NFL and CFL ===
Stewart was selected by the New Orleans Saints in the eighth round, with the 218th overall pick, of the 1992 NFL draft as a defensive lineman. On July 29, 1992, in a joint practice with the Minnesota Vikings, Stewart was noted for overpowering eight-year veteran Viking center Kirk Lowdermilk twice in one-on-one drills. Stewart was waived by the Saints on August 25, 1992.

On April 2, 1993, it was reported that Stewart had been signed by the Hamilton Tiger-Cats of the Canadian Football League. He was released on June 18, 1993. Stewart then started working at a steel mill in Northport, Alabama, in shipping and receiving when he received a phone call about arena football.

=== Charlotte Rage ===
Stewart signed with the Charlotte Rage of the Arena Football League (AFL) for the 1994 season. He was an offensive lineman/defensive lineman during his time in the AFL as the league played under ironman rules. In regards to playing offense, Stewart stated "I actually like going both ways. You have to be in the best shape of your life to play this game. If a guy can play arena football, he can play anywhere he wants to play." He played center and nose guard with the Rage. During his first game of arena football, Stewart knocked Tampa Bay Storm quarterback Jay Gruden, who had thrown five touchdowns, out of the game late in the fourth quarter. The Rage won 44–39. Stewart played in all 14 games for the Rage during the 1994 season, recording 13 solo tackles, two assisted tackles, one sack, and one pass breakup. The Rage finished the year with a 5–7 record and lost in the first round of the playoffs to the Arizona Rattlers by a score of 52–24. Stewart was named first-team All-Arena for his performance during the 1994 season.

Stewart appeared in all 12 games for Charlotte for the second consecutive year in 1995, totaling seven solo tackles, two assisted tackles, two sacks, and one forced fumble. The Rage went 5–7 for the second straight season but missed the playoffs this time. Stewart earned second-team All-Arena honors. He played in 10 games for the Rage during the 1996 season, accruing three solo tackles, four assisted tackles, two sacks, one forced fumble, and two pass breakups. Charlotte finished the year with a 5–9 record.

=== New Jersey Red Dogs ===
Stewart was selected by the New Jersey Red Dogs in the tenth round, with the 30th overall pick, of the 1997 AFL expansion draft. On May 23, 1997, against the New York CityHawks, Stewart blocked a 60-yard field goal attempt and recovered it in the end zone for a touchdown. New Jersey won 59–27. Stewart played in all 14 games for the Red Dogs in 1997, posting eight solo tackles, four assisted tackles, and five sacks. New Jersey went 9–5 and lost in the quarterfinals to the Orlando Predators by a margin of 45–37. Stewart earned second-team All-Arena honors once again.

Stewart appeared in all 14 games for the second straight year in 1998, recording eight solo tackles, 11 assisted tackles, four sacks, and one pass breakup as the team finished 8–6. They beat the Albany Firebirds in the first round of the postseason but lost in the semifinals to the Storm. Stewart was named second-team All-Arena for the third time in his career.

Stewart had the best season of his career in 1999, totaling a career-high 17 solo tackles, seven assisted tackles, a career-high eight sacks, one forced fumble, two pass breakups, and one blocked kick. His eight sacks were also the most in the league that year. Stewart garnered AFL Lineman of the Year and first-team All-Arena honors for his performance during the 1999 season. Despite his strong season, the Red Dogs finished with a 6–8 record.

After missing the playoffs for the first time in three years, the Red Dogs revamped their team for the 2000 season. New Jersey signed former NFL quarterback Tommy Maddox and a slew of AFL rookies, with Stewart stating "The whole team is new players or rookies. That's what I like. It's going to be a shock to [the league]." Despite Stewart's prediction, the Red Dogs ended up going 4–10. He played in all 14 of the games that year, posting seven solo tackles, nine assisted tackles, four sacks, one fumble recovery, and one pass breakup. He became a free agent after the 2000 season.

=== New York Dragons ===
Stewart signed with the AFL's New York Dragons on November 17, 2000. In regards to his decision to leave the Red Dogs, Stewart said "I wanted to get out of a situation that was on the verge of going down and I wanted to put myself in the best position to win a championship." On June 30 against his former team the Red Dogs, Stewart became the first player in AFL history to have four sacks in one game. He was named the AFL Ironman of the Week. Stewart played in all 14 games overall in 2001, accumulating seven solo tackles, ten assisted tackles, two forced fumbles, one fumble recovery, three pass breakups, and tying his career-high with eight sacks. He also caught three passes for 27 yards. He was named first-team All-Arena for the third time. The Dragons finished the 2001 season with an 8–6 record and lost in the first round to the Toronto Phantoms 64–57.

The next year, Stewart was placed on the refused to report list on March 24, 2002. He was activated from refused to report on April 2, and re-signed with New York the same day. He played in all 14 games for the sixth consecutive season, starting 13, in 2002 and recorded six solo tackles, six assisted tackles, two sacks, two forced fumbles, one pass breakup, and two receptions for 15 yards. The Dragons went 3–11.

=== Later career ===
Stewart joined the Colorado Crush of the AFL for the 2003 season. He was placed on the refused to report list on January 8, activated the next day, signed on January 17, and released on January 24. He was then signed by the Arizona Rattlers on January 31, 2003, a few days before the start of the 2003 AFL season. He was placed on injured reserve on March 7 and activated on March 23. He was released on April 2, 2003. Stewart appeared in six games, starting five, overall for the Rattlers in 2003, posting seven solo tackles, two assisted tackles, and one sack.

Stewart then signed with the Carolina Cobras of the AFL on April 9, 2003. He played in six games, starting four, for Carolina during the 2003 season, recording four solo tackles, three assisted tackles, 1.5 sacks, and one pass breakup. He became a free agent after the season and re-signed with the Cobras on October 31, 2003. Stewart was a starter for the Cobras during his final AFL season in 2004, playing in a career-high 16 games while totaling four solo tackles and seven assisted tackles as Carolina went 6–10.

== Personal life ==
After his football career, Stewart worked as a school security officer. He worked for the Charlotte Mecklenburg School System, Turning Point Academy, and Thomasboro Elementary. He died of heart complications on June 4, 2022, in Charlotte, North Carolina.
