= Jay Jones (American football) =

American football player (born 1974)

No. 5
- Position: Wide receiver / Defensive back

Personal information
- Born: February 25, 1974 (age 52)
- Listed height: 6 ft 1 in (1.85 m)
- Listed weight: 190 lb (86 kg)

Career information
- High school: George Wythe (Richmond, Virginia)
- College: James Madison (1993–1996)
- NFL draft: 1997: undrafted

Career history
- New York Jets (1997)*; Albany/Indiana Firebirds (1998–2003)
- * Offseason or practice squad member only

Awards and highlights
- ArenaBowl champion (1999); Second-team All-Arena (2001)

Career AFL statistics
- Receptions: 197
- Receiving yards: 2,165
- Tackles: 154.5
- Interceptions: 6
- Total TDs: 39
- Stats at ArenaFan.com

Jay Jones (born February 25, 1974) is an American former professional football wide receiver who played six seasons with the Albany/Indiana Firebirds of the Arena Football League (AFL). He played college football at James Madison University.

== Early life ==
Jay Jones was born on February 25, 1974. He attended George Wythe High School in Richmond, Virginia.

== College career ==
Jones played college football for the James Madison Dukes of James Madison University, and was a four-year letterman from 1993 to 1996. He recorded career totals of 151 receptions, 1,862 receiving yards, 14 receiving touchdowns, 819 kickoff return yards, and 2,760 all-purpose yards. He set the NCAA Division I-AA record with 268 kickoff return yards in a win against the Richmond Spiders during the 1996 season after returning a kickoff for a touchdown and another for 92 yards.

== Professional career ==
Jones signed with the New York Jets on April 25, 1997, after going undrafted in the 1997 NFL draft. On August 5, 1997, it was reported that Jones had voluntarily left the team after not playing in the Jets' first preseason game.

Jones played in 78 games for the Albany/Indiana Firebirds of the Arena Football League from 1998 to 2003, totaling 197 catches for 2,165 yards and 36 touchdowns, 126 solo tackles, 57 assisted tackles, six interceptions, 28 pass breakups, one forced fumble, three fumble recoveries, and 125 kick returns for 2,346 yards and two touchdowns. He was a wide receiver/defensive back during his time in the AFL as the league played under ironman rules. He earned second-team All-Arena honors in 2001.

== Personal life ==
In January 2018, Jones became the dean of students at Logansport Junior High School in Logansport, Indiana.
