= Arena Football League 25 Greatest Players =

The Arena Football League 25 Greatest Players was compiled in 2012 to show the league's top 25 players in its 25-year history.

= AFL Hall of Famer

Rank	Player	Teams played for	Position	Ref
1	Barry Wagner	Orlando Predators; San Jose SaberCats; Tampa Bay Storm	Wide receiver/Defensive back	
2	Eddie Brown	Albany/Indiana Firebirds	Offensive Specialist	
3	Aaron Garcia	Arizona Rattlers; Connecticut Coyotes; New Jersey Red Dogs; Iowa Barnstormers; New York Dragons; Jacksonville Sharks; San Antonio Talons	Quarterback	
4	Jay Gruden	Tampa Bay Storm; Orlando Predators	Quarterback	
5	Hunkie Cooper	Arizona Rattlers	Wide Receiver/Linebacker	
6	George LaFrance	Detroit Drive; Tampa Bay Storm; New Jersey Red Dogs	Offensive Specialist	
7	Sherdrick Bonner	Arizona Rattlers; Chicago Rush	Quarterback	
8	Clint Dolezel	Milwaukee Mustangs; Texas Terror/Houston Thunderbears; Grand Rapids Rampage; Las Vegas Gladiators; Dallas Desperados	Quarterback	
9	Sam Hernandez	Las Vegas Sting; Anaheim Piranhas; San Jose SaberCats	Offensive Lineman/Defensive Lineman	
10	Damian Harrell	New England Sea Wolves; Toronto Phantoms; Colorado Crush; Chicago Rush; Milwaukee Mustangs	Wide receiver/Defensive back	
11	Sylvester Bembery	New England Steamrollers; Albany Firebirds; Tampa Bay Storm; Buffalo Destroyers; Tampa Bay Storm	Offensive Lineman/Defensive Lineman	
12	Stevie Thomas	Tampa Bay Storm; Orlando Predators	Wide receiver/Linebacker	
13	Kenny McEntyre	Orlando Predators	Defensive Specialist	
14	John Corker	Detroit Drive; Miami Hooters	Offensive Lineman/Defensive Lineman	
15	Dwayne Dixon	Washington Commandos; Detroit Drive	Wide receiver/Linebacker	
16	Kurt Warner	Iowa Barnstormers	Quarterback	
17	Bob McMillen	Arizona Rattlers; San Jose SaberCats; Chicago Rush	Fullback/Linebacker	
18	Mark Grieb	Anaheim Piranhas; Milwaukee Mustangs; San Jose SaberCats	Quarterback	
19	Darryl Hammond	Albany Firebirds; St. Louis Stampede; Nashville Kats; Georgia Force; Austin Wranglers	Wide Receiver/Defensive Back	
20	Alvin Rettig	Detroit Drive	Fullback/Linebacker	
21	Durwood Roquemore	Chicago Bruisers; Albany Firebirds; Orlando Predators	Wide Receiver/Defensive Back	
22	Chris Jackson	Los Angeles Avengers; Grand Rapids Rampage; Georgia Force; Philadelphia Soul; Arizona Rattlers	Wide receiver/Linebacker	
23	Ben Bennett	Chicago Bruisers; Dallas Texans; Orlando Predators; San Jose SaberCats; Portland Forest Dragons	Quarterback	
24	Clevan Thomas	San Jose SaberCats	Wide receiver/Defensive back	
25	Gary Mullen	Denver Dynamite; Los Angeles Cobras; Detroit Drive; Cincinnati Rockers; Milwaukee Mustangs	Wide receiver/Defensive back	
