= Arena Football League 20 Greatest Players =

The Arena Football League 20 Greatest Players was compiled in 2006 to show the league's top 20 players in its 20-year history.

= AFL Hall of Famer

Rank	Player	Teams played for	Position	Ref
1	Eddie Brown	Albany/Indiana Firebirds	Offensive specialist	
2	Barry Wagner	Orlando Predators; San Jose SaberCats	Wide receiver/defensive back	
3	George LaFrance	Detroit Drive; Tampa Bay Storm; New Jersey Red Dogs	Offensive specialist	
4	Jay Gruden	Tampa Bay Storm; Orlando Predators	Quarterback	
5	Hunkie Cooper	Arizona Rattlers	Wide receiver/Linebacker	
6	James Baron	Nashville Kats; Chicago Rush	Offensive lineman/Defensive lineman	
7	Sylvester Bembery	New England Steamrollers; Albany Firebirds; Tampa Bay Storm; Buffalo Destroyers	Offensive lineman/Defensive lineman	
8	Sherdrick Bonner	Arizona Rattlers	Quarterback	
9	Stevie Thomas	Tampa Bay Storm; Orlando Predators	Wide receiver/Linebacker	
10	Dwayne Dixon	Washington Commandos; Detroit Drive	Wide receiver/Linebacker	
11	Aaron Garcia	Arizona Rattlers; Connecticut Coyotes; New Jersey Red Dogs; Iowa Barnstormers; New York Dragons	Quarterback	
12	Kurt Warner	Iowa Barnstormers	Quarterback	
13	Sam Hernandez	Las Vegas Sting; Anaheim Piranhas; San Jose SaberCats	Offensive lineman/Defensive lineman	
14	Cory Fleming	Nashville Kats; Carolina Cobras; Orlando Predators	Wide receiver/Linebacker	
14	Greg Hopkins	Albany/Indiana Firebirds; Los Angeles Avengers	Wide receiver/Linebacker	
16	Alvin Rettig	Detroit Drive	Fullback/Linebacker	
17	Randy Gatewood	Arizona Rattlers	Wide receiver/Defensive back	
17	Gary Mullen	Denver Dynamite; Los Angeles Cobras; Detroit Drive; Cincinnati Rockers; Milwaukee Mustangs	Wide receiver/Defensive back	
19	John Corker	Detroit Drive; Miami Hooters	Offensive lineman/Defensive lineman	
20	Bob McMillen	Arizona Rattlers; Chicago Rush	Fullback/Linebacker	
