= Jon Krick =

American football player (born 1972)

Profile
- Positions: Fullback, linebacker

Personal information
- Born: November 24, 1972 (age 53)
- Listed height: 6 ft 2 in (1.88 m)
- Listed weight: 280 lb (127 kg)

Career information
- College: Purdue

Career history
- Albany/Indiana Firebirds (1997–2002)

Awards and highlights
- ArenaBowl champion (1999); Second-team All-Arena (1999); AFL Most Inspirational Player of the Year (2000)

Career AFL statistics
- Rushes: 27
- Rushing yards: 108
- Rushing TDs: 7
- Tackles: 46
- Sacks: 7.5
- Stats at ArenaFan.com

Jon Krick (born November 24, 1972) is an American former football player who played four seasons with the Albany Firebirds of the Arena Football League (AFL). He played college football at Purdue.

== College career ==
Krick played for the Purdue Boilermakers, recording 89 tackles, 53 assists and 15 tackles for losses. A two-year captain, he was All-Big Ten honorable mention from 1994 to 1996. He overcame a season-ending injury in 1992 to return a year later but was diagnosed with diabetes. Krick started all but two games in his final three seasons with the Boilermakers.

== Professional career ==
Krick played for the Albany Firebirds from 1997 to 2002, earning second-team All-Arena honors in 1999 and was named the AFL's Most Inspirational Player of the Year in 2000.
