= Evan Hlavacek =

American football player (born 1974)

Profile
- Position: Wide receiver/defensive back

Personal information
- Born: November 27, 1974 (age 51); San Jose, California, U.S.
- Listed height: 5 ft 10 in (1.78 m)
- Listed weight: 185 lb (84 kg)

Career information
- College: San Diego
- NFL draft: 1998: undrafted

Career history
- Albany/Indiana Firebirds (1999–2004); Arizona Rattlers (2005); Colorado Crush (2006)

Awards and highlights
- ArenaBowl champion (1999); Second-team All-Arena (2003); AFL All-Ironman Team (2003)

Career AFL statistics
- Receptions: 55
- Rec. Yards: 738
- Rec. Touchdowns: 17
- Tackles: 205
- KR-KR Yards-KR TDs: 154-3,454-12
- Stats at ArenaFan.com

Evan Hlavacek (born November 27, 1974) is an American former football wide receiver/defensive back most recently playing for the Colorado Crush in the Arena Football League (AFL).

He is now a firefighter with the Central Yavapai Fire District in Prescott Valley, Arizona.

== College years ==
Hlavacek graduated from the University of San Diego and was a standout athlete in football, and baseball. In football, he was a three-time All-Pioneer Football League selection.

== Professional career ==
On March 21, 2002, Hlavacek re-signed with the Indiana Firebirds.
