= Rich McKenzie =

American football player (born 1971)

No. 99, 90
- Position: Linebacker

Personal information
- Born: April 15, 1971 (age 55); Fort Lauderdale, Florida, U.S.
- Listed height: 6 ft 2 in (1.88 m)
- Listed weight: 258 lb (117 kg)

Career information
- High school: Boyd Anderson (Lauderdale Lakes, Florida)
- College: Penn State
- NFL draft: 1993: 6th round, 153rd overall pick

Career history
- Cleveland Browns (1993–1995); New England Patriots (1996)*; Tampa Bay Buccaneers (1997)*; Orlando Predators (1998–2001); Chicago Rush (2002)
- * Offseason or practice squad member only

Awards and highlights
- 2× ArenaBowl champion (1998, 2000); Second-team All-Arena (1999); Second-team All-East (1991)

Career NFL statistics
- Tackles: 5
- Sacks: 1.5
- Fumble recoveries: 1
- Stats at Pro Football Reference

Career AFL statistics
- Tackles: 30
- Sacks: 3
- Passes defended: 9
- Stats at ArenaFan.com

Richard Anthony McKenzie (born April 15, 1971) is an American former professional football player who was a linebacker in the National Football League (NFL). An All-American linebacker in high school, McKenzie played college football for the Penn State Nittany Lions and left the team after the 1992 season. Although regarded as a dominant linebacker and considered by some to be the best athlete on that year's football team, Mckenzie was benched in the final bowl game due to disciplinary issues with Coach Joe Paterno. McKenzie's off-the-field issues caused many NFL teams to pass on him, leading to his selection in the sixth round of the 1993 NFL draft. After three years and only eight game appearances, McKenzie left the NFL.
