= Greg Hopkins =

American football player (born 1971)

No. 82
- Positions: Wide receiver, linebacker

Personal information
- Born: November 16, 1971 (age 54); Waynesburg, Pennsylvania, U.S.
- Listed height: 6 ft 2 in (1.88 m)
- Listed weight: 205 lb (93 kg)

Career information
- High school: Waynesburg Central (PA)
- College: Slippery Rock

Career history
- Albany/Indiana Firebirds (1996–2001); Los Angeles Avengers (2002–2006)

Awards and highlights
- ArenaBowl champion (1999); 2× First-team All-Arena (2002, 2003); 2× Second-team All-Arena (1998, 2000); AFL Ironman of the Year (2002); 4× AFL All-Ironman Team (1999, 2001, 2002, 2003); AFL's 20 Greatest Players #14 (2006); Arena Football Hall of Fame (2013)

Career AFL statistics
- Receptions: 833
- Receiving yards: 10,206
- Tackles: 267
- Interceptions: 26
- Total touchdowns: 213
- Stats at ArenaFan.com

Greg Hopkins (born November 16, 1971) is an American former Arena Football League (AFL) wide receiver/linebacker with the Albany Firebirds and the Los Angeles Avengers.

== Early life ==
Greg Hopkins was born in Waynesburg, Pennsylvania. He attended West Greene Junior/Senior High School and then Waynesburg Central High School in Waynesburg, Pennsylvania and was a quarterback in football, a wrestler on the wrestling team, and a record-setting javelin thrower on the track and field team.

== College career ==
While attending Slippery Rock University of Pennsylvania, Greg Hopkins was a four-year letterman in football and a two-year letterman in wrestling. In football, he was a three-time All America honoree, a three-time All-Pennsylvania State Athletic Conference selection, and won Academic All-America honors as a senior. He set nine school records, and finished his spectacular college career with 215 receptions for 3,382 yards (15.73 yards per reception avg.).

== Arena Football League career ==
- 1996 - Albany Firebirds: Was limited to two games due to a hand injury and finished the year with two receptions and three tackles.
- 1997 - Albany Firebirds: He had a solid year, making 58 receptions for 908 yards (15.66 yards per rec. avg.) and 15 touchdowns on offense, and 22 tackles and two pass deflections on defense.
- 2001 - Indiana Firebirds: Hopkins was a strong candidate for "Ironman of the Year" honors. On offense, he made 102 receptions for 1,226 yards (12.02 yards per rec. avg.) and 18 touchdowns. On defense, he made 0.5 sack, 34 tackles, four forced fumbles, a fumble recovery, two interceptions, and three pass deflections.
- 2002 - Los Angeles Avengers: Hopkins had a spectacular year, and won first team All-Arena honors, All-Ironman honors (at both WR and LB), and was voted "Ironman of the Year." He finished the year with 102 receptions for 1,185 receiving yards (11.62 yards per rec. avg.) and 29 touchdowns on offense. As a linebacker, he posted five interceptions, 45 tackles, a forced fumble, and two fumble recoveries.
- 2003 - Los Angeles Avengers: Hopkins had another superb year and made 87 receptions for 1192 yards and won All-Arena honors after the conclusion of the season.

On June 17, 2007, his number, #82, was officially retired by the Los Angeles Avengers during a halftime ceremony. He was named to the Arena Football Hall of Fame on August 10, 2013.

== Political career ==
In 2006, Hopkins was the Republican nominee for the Pennsylvania House of Representatives from that state's 50th Legislative District, which includes all of Greene County and small parts of Washington and Fayette counties. He received approximately 47 percent of the vote against the district's longtime incumbent legislator, Bill DeWeese, winning in Greene County and losing by small margins in the other counties.

Hopkins announced that he would make a second run for the Republican nomination for the seat in 2008. He was defeated by the incumbent, Bill DeWeese.
