= Leroy Thompson =

American gridiron football player and coach (born 1971)

No. 33
- Position: Linebacker

Personal information
- Born: January 23, 1971 (age 55); Camden, New Jersey, U.S.
- Listed height: 6 ft 2 in (1.88 m)
- Listed weight: 270 lb (122 kg)

Career information
- High school: Williamstown (NJ)
- College: Delaware State
- NFL draft: 1993: undrafted

Career history

Playing
- Toronto Argonauts (1994); Philadelphia Eagles (1996)*; Albany / Indiana Firebirds (1996–2004); New Orleans VooDoo (2005); Columbus Destroyers (2006–2008)
- * Offseason or practice squad member only

Coaching
- Los Angeles Avengers (2008) Defensive line/Linebackers coach; Wesley College (2010) Defensive line coach; Lincoln University (PA) (2011) Defensive line coach; Philadelphia Soul (2012) Defensive line coach; Pittsburgh Power (2014) Defensive line coach; Atlanta Legends (2019) Defensive line coach

Awards and highlights
- ArenaBowl champion (1999); First-team All-Arena (2002); AFL Built Ford Tough Man of the Year (2002); All-MEAC First Team (1992)

Career AFL statistics
- Rush attempts: 383
- Rush yards: 1,121
- Rush touchdowns: 68
- Tackles: 116
- Sacks: 14.5
- Stats at ArenaFan.com

Leroy Thompson (born January 23, 1971) is a former fullback/linebacker in the Arena Football League for 13 years. He has played for the Albany / Indiana Firebirds (1996–2004), the New Orleans VooDoo (2005) and the Columbus Destroyers (2006–2008). He played college football at Delaware State University where he was a first team Division I-AA All-American and holds all quarterback sack records. Played with the Philadelphia Eagles of the NFL in 1996 and also with the Toronto Argonauts of the CFL in 1994.

== College career ==
Thompson attended Delaware State University where he was a two-time All Mid-Eastern Athletic Conference selection. During his junior season, he recorded a school record 16 sacks, and five sacks in one game against North Carolina A&T which is also a school record. As a senior, Thompson earned First Team Division I-AA Kodak All-America honors as he led the team with 89 tackles and 11 sacks. Leroy's 30 career sacks rate third all-time for the Hornets.

== Professional career ==
Thompson played an astounding thirteen seasons in the AFL, and is considered one of the leagues all-time greatest linebacker/fullbacks. Previously playing for the Albany / Indiana Firebirds (1996–2004), New Orleans VooDoo (2005), and the Columbus Destroyers (2006–08). His best statistical season came in 2000 while playing for the Firebirds, rushing the ball 59 times for 191 yards and 14 touchdowns. Defensively, his best season came in 2002 tallying 16 tackles and five sacks including 37 rushes for 117 yards and 10 touchdowns. His efforts were rewarded that season by being named First Team All-Arena FB/LB, and the AFL's Ford Tough Man of the Year.

Thompson was a participant in the 2007 ArenaBowl as a member of the National Conference Champion, Columbus Destroyers, and also won an ArenaBowl Championship in 1999 with the Albany Firebirds. When he retired in 2008, he was only one of six AFL players who had rushed for over 1,000 career yards. He led his team in rushing six of his 13 seasons in the League, while being in the Top 10 overall in that same category five out of those 13 seasons.

== Coaching career ==
Thompson was invited by the San Diego Chargers in the 2015 training camp to work as the assistant to defensive line coach Don Johnson through the Bill Walsh NFL Minority Coaches Internship Program. In 2012 and 2013, Thompson was also a member of Chuck Pagano's Indianapolis Colts coaching staff through the same program. Pagano states that Thompson is an up-and-coming defensive line coach on the NFL level. He was also a member of the Philadelphia Eagles coaching staff in the 2011 training camp where he served as assistant coach under former defensive line coach Jim Washburn. He also coached on the college level as an assistant coach at Wesley College and Lincoln University (Pa.). While at Lincoln, he helped the second-year program win two more games than the previous season, working with a defensive unit that shaved nearly two touchdowns per game off of its points allowed. In 2013, Thompson was named the defensive line coach for the Pittsburgh Power.

In 2018, Thompson became the defensive line coach for the Atlanta Legends of the newly formed Alliance of American Football.

== Personal ==
Thompson also played the role of Philadelphia Eagles defensive end Carl "Big Daddy" Hairston in the Vince Papale movie Invincible.
