= Oklahoma Wranglers =

Arena football team

Logo

General information
- Founded: 1995
- Folded: 2001
- Headquartered: Myriad Convention Center in Oklahoma City
- Colors: Maroon, black, silver, white

Personnel
- Owner: Ed Gatlin
- General manager: David Vance
- Head coach: Bob Cortese

Team history
- Memphis Pharaohs (1995–1996); Portland Forest Dragons (1997–1999); Oklahoma Wranglers (2000–2001)

Home fields
- Myriad Convention Center (2000–2001); Rose Garden Arena (Portland, Oregon, 1997–1999); The Pyramid (Memphis, Tennessee, 1995–1996)

League / conference affiliations
- Arena Football League (1995–2001): American Conference (1995–2001); Central (1995–1997); Western (1998–2001)

Playoff appearances (1)
- 2000

The Oklahoma Wranglers were a professional arena football team based in Oklahoma City, Oklahoma. They were members of the Central (1996–1997) and Western (1998–2001) Division of the American Conference of the Arena Football League (AFL). They previously played as the Memphis Pharaohs and Portland Forest Dragons. The team played at the Myriad, now known as the Myriad Convention Center, in downtown Oklahoma City.

== History ==
=== Memphis Pharaohs (1995–1996) ===
The Memphis Pharaohs played at the Pyramid Arena in Memphis, Tennessee, in 1995 and 1996. The team was named the Pharaohs because the capital of ancient Egypt was Memphis, Egypt, and because they literally played their home games in a pyramid. Memphis saw a return of the sport with the Memphis Xplorers of af2.

=== Portland Forest Dragons (1997–1999) ===
After a winless 1996 season, the team relocated to Portland, Oregon, where they played for three seasons as the Portland Forest Dragons. In years of 1997, 1998, and 1999, the Forest Dragons compiled records of 2–12, 4–10, and 7–7, never making the playoffs while in Portland. During the 1998 season the team featured receiver Oronde Gadsden, who won the league's Rookie of the Year award, and went on to sign with the NFL's Miami Dolphins. Portland would see a return of the AFL in 2014 with the Portland Thunder, renamed the Portland Steel in 2016.

=== Oklahoma Wranglers (2000–2001) ===
After three seasons in Portland, the franchise relocated again, this time to Oklahoma City. The franchise moved after its owner attempted and failed to sell the team to an owner committed to keeping the team in Portland. After relocating, the team changed their name to the Oklahoma Wranglers. The team played in Oklahoma City for two seasons before being disbanded by the league after the 2001 season.

== AFL return to Oklahoma City ==
The AFL's developmental league af2 welcomed the Oklahoma City Yard Dawgz to play from 2004 to 2009. In 2010, nearly a decade after the Wranglers last played, the Yard Dawgz joined the newly reorganized AFL and played only one season before folding.

== Season-by-season ==
ArenaBowl champions	ArenaBowl appearance	Division champions	Playoff berth

Season	League	Conference	Division	Regular season			Postseason results
Season	League	Conference	Division	Finish	Wins	Losses	Postseason results
Memphis Pharaohs
1995	AFL	American	Central	3rd	6	6	Lost Quarterfinals (Tampa Bay) 53–31
1996	AFL	American	Central	4th	0	14	
Portland Forest Dragons
1997	AFL	American	Central	4th	2	12	
1998	AFL	American	Western	3rd	4	10	
1999	AFL	American	Western	2nd	7	7	
Oklahoma Wranglers
2000	AFL	American	Western	3rd	7	7	Won Wild Card Round (New England) 52–38; Lost Quarterfinals (San Jose) 63–40
2001	AFL	American	Western	4th	5	9	
Total					31	53	(includes only regular season)
Total					1	2	(includes only the postseason)
Total					32	55	(includes both regular season and postseason)

== Notable players ==
=== Arena Football Hall of Famers ===
Oklahoma Wranglers Hall of Famers
No.	Name	Year Inducted	Position(s)	Years w/ Wranglers
25	Michael Madison	2001	LB	2000

=== Individual awards ===
Rookie of the Year
Season	Player	Position(s)
1998	Oronde Gadsden	OS

Most Inspirational Player of the Year
Season	Player	Position(s)
1999	James Guidry	QB

Don't Blink! Player of the Year
Season	Player	Position(s)
2001	Lamart Cooper	OS

=== All-Arena players ===
The following Wranglers players were named to All-Arena Teams:

- WR/DB Darren Hughes (1), Brian Greene (1)
- OL/DL Tom Briggs (1)
- DS Mark Ricks (1)
- K Daron Alcorn (2)

=== All-Ironman players ===
The following Wranglers players were named to All-Ironman Teams:

- OL/DL Tom Briggs (1)

=== All-Rookie players ===
The following Wranglers players were named to All-Rookie Teams:

- WR/LB Bobby McGowens
- OS Oronde Gadsden

== In popular culture ==
The character Colt Bennett portrayed by Ashton Kutcher in the Netflix series The Ranch says he was cut by the Portland Forest Dragons.
