= Cornelius Coe =

American football player (born 1975)

No. 22
- Position: Defensive specialist

Personal information
- Born: September 17, 1975 (age 51)
- Listed height: 5 ft 10 in (1.78 m)
- Listed weight: 185 lb (84 kg)

Career information
- High school: Taft (Chicago, Illinois)
- College: Northern Michigan (1995–1998)
- NFL draft: 1999: undrafted

Career history
- Peoria Pirates (1999); Quad City Steamwheelers (2000); Indiana Firebirds (2001–2002); Las Vegas Gladiators (2003); Los Angeles Avengers (2003–2004)

Awards and highlights
- ArenaCup champion (2000); af2 Defensive Player of the Year (2000); Second-team All-Arena (2001); AFL All-Rookie Team (2001); IFL All-Star (1999)

Career AFL statistics
- Tackles: 237.5
- Pass breakups: 27
- Forced fumbles: 4
- Interceptions: 12
- Total TDs: 1
- Stats at ArenaFan.com

Cornelius Coe (born September 17, 1975) is an American former professional football defensive specialist who played four seasons in the Arena Football League (AFL) with the Indiana Firebirds, Las Vegas Gladiators, and Los Angeles Avengers. He played college football at Northern Michigan University. He was also a member of the Peoria Pirates of the Indoor Football League (IFL) and the Quad City Steamwheelers of the af2.

== Early life ==
Coe participated in football and wrestling at William Howard Taft High School in Chicago, Illinois.

== College career ==
Coe played college football for the Northern Michigan Wildcats, and was a four-year letterman from 1995 to 1998. He recorded career totals of 291 tackles and ten interceptions as a four-year letterman for the Northern Michigan Wildcats. He was also a two-time ALL-MIFC Defense First Team selection and twice named Northern Michigan’s Outstanding Defensive Back. Coe led the Wildcats in tackles his senior year with 102, including 13 for losses.

== Professional career ==
Coe played for the Peoria Pirates of the Indoor Football League (IFL) in 1999, earning IFL all-star honors as a special teamer.

Coe played for the Quad City Steamwheelers of the af2 in 2000. He helped the 19–0 Steamwheelers win ArenaCup I. Coe was named af2 Defensive Player of the Year after leading the league with 169 tackles and also leading with six fumble recoveries. He was tied for third in the af2 with nine interceptions and second with three forced fumbles.

Coe signed with the Indiana Firebirds of the Arena Football League (AFL) on January 22, 2001. He played in all 14 games for the Firebirds in 2001, earning second-team All-Arena and AFL All-Rookie Team honors. He only played in five games (all starts) in 2002, spending the rest of the year on injured reserve.

Coe signed with the Las Vegas Gladiators of the AFL on January 16, 2003. He played in one game for the Gladiators but did not record any statistics. He was placed on recallable waivers on February 5, 2003.

Coe was signed by the AFL's Los Angeles Avengers on March 15, 2003. He appeared in ten games, all starts, for Los Angeles during the 2003 season. He played in the first two games of the 2004 season before being placed on the left the squad list on February 20, 2004, after being charged with multiple cocaine-related felony counts. Coe never played in the AFL again, and was released by the Avengers on November 24, 2004.
