= Sherdrick Bonner =

American football player and broadcaster (born 1968)

No. 13
- Position: Quarterback

Personal information
- Born: October 19, 1968 (age 58); Azusa, California, U.S.
- Listed height: 6 ft 4 in (1.93 m)
- Listed weight: 240 lb (109 kg)

Career information
- High school: Azusa
- College: Cal State Northridge
- NFL draft: 1991: undrafted

Career history
- Arizona Rattlers (1993–1998); Miami Dolphins (1995)*; Atlanta Falcons (1998)*; Arizona Cardinals (1999); San Diego Chargers (1999); Arizona Rattlers (2000–2007); Chicago Rush (2008)
- * Offseason or practice squad member only

Awards and highlights
- 2× ArenaBowl champion (1994, 1997); ArenaBowl MVP (1994); 2× First-team All-Arena (1998, 2003); 3× Second-team All-Arena (1997, 2000, 2002); AFL 20 Greatest Players - #8 (2006); AFL 25 Greatest Players - #7 (2012); AFL Hall of Fame (2012)

Career AFL statistics
- Comp.–Att.: 3,350–5,432
- Passing yards: 42,246
- TD–INT: 855–124
- Passer rating: 115.72
- Stats at ArenaFan.com

Sherdrick Deon "Sed" Bonner (born October 19, 1968) is an American former professional football quarterback who played fifteen seasons in the Arena Football League (AFL).

== Early life ==
Bonner attended Azusa High School in Azusa, California and was a student and a letterman in football, basketball, baseball and track & field.

== College career ==
Bonner graduated from Cal State Northridge in 1991 with a Bachelor of Science degree in kinesiology and was a member of Sigma Pi fraternity. While there, he started at quarterback and led the Matadors to the 1990 Western Football Conference co-championship and the program's only playoff appearance. He completed 319 of 637 passes for 3,533 yards and 18 touchdowns in 37 career games. He earned honorable mention All-Western Football Conference honors his senior year in 1991. Bonner also lettered in basketball, volleyball, and track and field. He played 23 games for the basketball team in the 1987–88 season, outside hitter for the men's volleyball team in the 1991 season, and took first place in the high jump three times. He was inducted into CSUN's Matador Hall of Fame on October 2, 1998.

Bonner was inducted into the Cal State Northridge Matadors Hall of Fame in 1998.

== Professional career ==
=== Arizona Rattlers (first stint) ===
Bonner first played for the Arizona Rattlers of the Arena Football League (AFL) from 1993 to 1998. He won ArenaBowl VIII in 1994 and ArenaBowl XI in 1997.

=== Miami Dolphins ===
Bonner signed with the Miami Dolphins of the National Football League (NFL) in March 1995. He was later released on June 13, 1995.

=== Atlanta Falcons ===
Bonner was signed to the practice squad of the Atlanta Falcons of the NFL on November 25, 1998. He remained on the Falcons' practice squad as they lost Super Bowl XXXIII to the Denver Broncos on January 31, 1999. He re-signed with Atlanta in February 1999. Bonner was waived on August 10, 1999.

=== Arizona Cardinals ===
On October 19, 1999, after Jake Plummer, the starting quarterback for the Arizona Cardinals suffered an injury, Bonner was signed to the team's active roster to serve as the third-string quarterback behind new starter Dave Brown and rookie Chris Greisen. Bonner was waived by the Cardinals on December 19, 1999.

=== San Diego Chargers ===
Bonner was claimed off waivers by the San Diego Chargers on December 20, 1999. He became a free agent after the 1999 season.

=== Arizona Rattlers (second stint) ===
ON August 10, 1999, Bonner re-signed with the Rattlers the same day he was waived by the Falcons. He played for the Rattlers again from 2000 to 2001. On March 25, 2002, he re-signed with the Rattlers.

On Friday, April 7, 2006, he got his 100th career win as his Rattlers won over the newly formed Utah Blaze 64–52 on the road.

On Saturday, April 28, 2007, in a 67–45 road loss to the New York Dragons, Bonner joined Clint Dolezel and Andy Kelly as the only quarterbacks to throw 800 career touchdown passes.

On Saturday, October 27, 2007, the Rattlers released Bonner after 14 seasons.

=== Chicago Rush ===
Bonner signed a two-year contract with the Chicago Rush on October 30, 2007. However, he was released in September 2008, after just one season with the Rush.

Throughout his AFL career, Bonner completed 3,350 passes for 42,246 yards, and 855 touchdowns. He is also the winningest quarterback in league history, with 134 regular season victories and 21 playoff wins (as of April 2, 2007). He is widely considered one of the greatest players in AFL history. Bonner was a 2012 inductee into the Arena Football Hall of Fame.

== Coaching career ==
Bonner began the 2011 AFL season as the offensive coordinator of the Chicago Rush after playing for Chicago in 2008. He called the plays and worked with quarterback Russ Michna. Bonner returned to coaching in the AFL as assistant head coach and offensive coordinator of the second incarnation of the Billings Outlaws, where he was a part of the ArenaBowl XXXIII championship-winning coaching staff under head coach Cedric Walker. He was named the 2024 AFL Assistant Coach of the Year. He left the Outlaws in 2025 upon joining the Vice Sports broadcast team.

== Broadcasting career ==
Bonner began his broadcasting career when he was approached by KAZT-TV in Phoenix to be an analyst for Thursday night high school football games. After the Rush folded, he turned his attention to broadcasting serving as both color analyst and sideline reporter for AFL games on CBS Sports Network in 2013 and later ESPN starting in 2014. Bonner also calls college football games for the Mountain West Conference on AT&T SportsNet Rocky Mountain, where he received a regional Emmy Award in 2015.

== Personal life ==
Bonner is currently married with two children. He also runs a business where he coaches quarterbacks.

== Career statistics ==
Legend
	ArenaBowl MVP
	Won the ArenaBowl
	Led the league
**Bold**	Career high

Year	Team	Passing							Rushing		
Year	Team	Cmp	Att	Pct	Yds	TD	Int	Rtg	Att	Yds	TD
1993	Arizona	2	5	40.0	26	0	0	57.08	2	4	0
1994	Arizona	208	363	57.3	2,685	46	12	98.56	18	**27**	3
1995	Arizona	54	90	60.0	574	11	3	95.32	3	10	1
1996	Arizona	286	462	61.9	3,690	65	13	110.40	8	-4	0
1997	Arizona	241	400	60.2	3,331	67	6	120.32	14	1	3
1998	Arizona	295	451	65.4	3,571	70	8	121.00	11	12	5
2000	Arizona	269	473	56.9	3,454	72	7	111.79	12	-11	3
2001	Arizona	193	297	65.0	2,505	46	7	120.28	7	-13	1
2002	Arizona	270	439	61.5	3,219	69	8	115.59	9	10	4
2003	Arizona	289	431	**67.1**	3,696	**89**	7	**126.51**	9	10	1
2004	Arizona	**348**	**536**	64.9	3,850	77	9	115.03	**24**	14	**9**
2005	Arizona	189	320	59.1	2,334	51	10	108.26	9	-1	4
2006	Arizona	295	507	58.2	3,991	83	**16**	109.80	11	22	1
2007	Arizona	315	498	63.3	**4,033**	83	13	117.24	9	7	1
2008	Chicago	96	160	60.0	1,287	26	5	112.16	2	6	0
Career		3,350	5,432	61.7	42,246	855	124	115.72	148	74	36
