= James Bowden =

James or Jim Bowden may refer to:

- James Bowden (footballer) (1880–1951), English footballer
- James Bowden (American football) (born 1973), American football wide receiver
- Jamie Bowden (born 1960), British diplomat
- Jim Bowden (baseball) (born 1961), American baseball analyst and general manager
- Jim Bowden (diver), American diver
- Jim Bowden (rugby league) (died c. 2003), English rugby league footballer who played in the 1950s
