= Chris Barber (gridiron football) =

American gridiron football player (born 1964)

No. 35, 33, 24, 20
- Position: Defensive back

Personal information
- Born: January 15, 1964 (age 62); Fort Bragg, North Carolina, U.S.
- Listed height: 6 ft 0 in (1.83 m)
- Listed weight: 187 lb (85 kg)

Career information
- High school: Parkland (Winston-Salem, North Carolina)
- College: North Carolina A&T
- NFL draft: 1987: undrafted

Career history
- Dallas Cowboys (1987)*; Cincinnati Bengals (1987–1989); Toronto Argonauts (1991); Raleigh-Durham Skyhawks (1991); Tampa Bay Buccaneers (1992); Cincinnati Rockers (1992); Fort Worth Cavalry (1994); San Jose SaberCats (1995); Orlando Predators (1996); San Jose SaberCats (1996); Orlando Predators (1997–1998); Milwaukee Mustangs (1999); New Jersey Red Dogs (2000)
- * Offseason or practice squad member only

Awards and highlights
- ArenaBowl champion (1998)

Career NFL statistics
- Games played: 14
- Stats at Pro Football Reference

Career CFL statistics
- Games played: 3

Career AFL statistics
- Tackles: 345
- Interceptions: 36
- Stats at ArenaFan.com

Christopher Edgar Barber (born January 15, 1964) is a former American and Canadian football defensive back in the National Football League (NFL), Canadian Football League (CFL), World League of American Football (WLAF) and Arena Football League (AFL). He played college football at North Carolina A&T.
