= Ernest Allen (American football) =

American football player (born 1973)

No. 95
- Position: Offensive lineman/defensive lineman

Personal information
- Born: March 11, 1973 (age 53)
- Listed height: 6 ft 4 in (1.93 m)
- Listed weight: 300 lb (136 kg)

Career information
- High school: John Adams (South Bend, Indiana)
- College: Cincinnati (1991–1994)
- NFL draft: 1995: undrafted

Career history
- Seattle Seahawks (1995)*; Florida Bobcats (1996); Albany Firebirds (1997); New Jersey Red Dogs (1998); Milwaukee Mustangs (1998–1999); Orlando Predators (2000–2003); Dallas Desperados (2004–2005); Philadelphia Soul (2006); Georgia Force (2007–2008)
- * Offseason or practice squad member only

Awards and highlights
- ArenaBowl champion (2000); 5× Second-team All-Arena (1998, 2001, 2002, 2003 and 2006)
- Stats at ArenaFan.com

Ernest Allen (born March 11, 1973) is an American former professional football player who was an offensive lineman/defensive lineman in the Arena Football League (AFL) from 1996 to 2008. He played for the Florida Bobcats (1996), Albany Firebirds (1997), New Jersey Red Dogs (1998), Milwaukee Mustangs (1998–1999), Orlando Predators (2000–2003), Dallas Desperados (2004–2005), Philadelphia Soul (2006), and Georgia Force (2007–2008).

== Early life ==
Allen attended John Adams High School in South Bend, Indiana, and was a letterman in football. In football, he won first team All-State honors at defensive tackle, and second team All-League honors at offensive tackle. In his final two years of high school, he produced 10 sacks, 12 forced fumbles, 65 tackles, and six fumble recoveries on defense.

== College career ==
Allen attended the University of Cincinnati, and finished his stellar college career with 11 sacks and 120 tackles (8 for losses). Six of those sacks, and 45 tackles came during his senior year. Was a Three year starter.

== Professional career ==
Allen was signed as a free agent in 1995 to the NFL Seattle Seahawks as a defensive tackle. He was released on August 21, 1995. He then signed with the NFL Europe's Rhein Fire in 1996 to the same position. He finished his AFL career second in league history in tackles for loss and one of the top 10 players in league history in sacks, also being selected to five All-Arena Teams during his career. He was named second-team All-Arena in 1998, 2001, 2002, 2003 and 2006.
