= Joe Jacobs (American football) =

American football player (born 1970)

Profile
- Position: Offensive lineman / defensive lineman

Personal information
- Born: September 21, 1970 (age 56); Benicia, California, U.S.
- Listed height: 6 ft 4 in (1.93 m)
- Listed weight: 285 lb (129 kg)

Career information
- High school: Benicia
- College: Utah State

Career history
- Toronto Argonauts (1994)*; Charlotte Rage (1995); Albany Firebirds (1996–2000); San Jose SaberCats (2001–2006)
- * Offseason or practice squad member only

Awards and highlights
- 3× ArenaBowl champion (1999, 2002, 2004); 3× First-team All-Arena (1998, 1999, 2000); Second-team All-Arena (2001); 2× AFL All-Ironman Team (1998, 1999)

Career AFL statistics
- Tackles: 127
- Quarterback sacks: 39.5
- Forced fumbles: 11
- Interceptions: 4
- Touchdowns: 2
- Stats at ArenaFan.com

Joseph Alan Jacobs (born September 21, 1970) is an American former NFL, Canadian Football League and Arena Football League offensive lineman/defensive lineman for the Charlotte Rage, Albany Firebirds and San Jose SaberCats.

== Early life ==
Jacobs attended Benicia High School in Benicia, California, and was an All-League and an All-America selection.

== College career ==
Jacobs attended Utah State University, and was a letterman in football. In football, he was a two-time first-team All-Big West Conference selection and after his senior year, he participated in the East-West Shrine Game. Jacobs ranked 17th Top Pro Athletes Of All-Time. Utah State University: Ranking The Top 20 Pro Athletes Of All-Time | Fan Insider
