= James Baron =

American football player (born 1973)

No. 95
- Position: Defensive lineman

Personal information
- Born: June 8, 1973 (age 53); Framingham, Massachusetts, U.S.
- Listed height: 6 ft 4 in (1.93 m)
- Listed weight: 260 lb (118 kg)

Career information
- High school: Hammond (IN) Gavit Jr./Sr.
- College: Virginia Tech
- NFL draft: 1996: undrafted

Career history
- Detroit Lions (1996)*; Nashville Kats (1997–2001); Chicago Bears (1998)*; Chicago Rush (2002–2004); Nashville Kats (2005–2007); Chicago Rush (2008)
- * Offseason or practice squad member only

Awards and highlights
- 1998 Nashville Kats Ironman of the Year; 1999 Nashville Kats co-Ironman of the Year (w/ Darryl Hammond); 2000 Nashville Kats Ironman of the Year; 1999 Defensive Player of the Year; ArenaBowl XIV Ironman of the Game; 2001 AFL Hero Award; 5× First-team All-Arena (1997, 1998, 1999, 2001, 2002); Second-team All-Arena (2000); 2× AFL Lineman of the Year (1998, 2001); 2× All-Ironman team (1999, 2001)

Career AFL statistics
- Tackles / Sacks: 122 / 48.5
- Forced fumbles: 12
- Receptions: 42
- Receiving yards: 348
- Touchdowns: 15
- Stats at ArenaFan.com

James Baron (born June 8, 1973) is an American former professional football defensive lineman in the Arena Football League. He was the Arena Football League Players Association's (AFLPA) president as well.

In his career, Baron has played for the Detroit Lions, the Nashville Kats, the Chicago Bears, and the Chicago Rush. He was one of only two players to play in all 80 games with the original Nashville Kats franchise, including ten postseason contests, quarterback Andy Kelly being the other. He also had a streak of 131 consecutive games played (including playoffs), which came to an end when he missed the first two games of the 2005 season with a foot injury. He also is the Kats' franchise leader in sacks with 34. He also holds team records for sacks in one season with 7.0.

== High school and college ==
Baron attended Donald E Gavit Jr./Sr. High School in Hammond, Indiana where he participated in wrestling and football. As a junior at Gavit High, he was a 1990 Junior Olympic champion in Greco-Roman wrestling. He was also an All-State selection in football his senior season. He graduated in 1991.

== College career ==
Baron attended Iowa Central Community College and Triton Junior College in Illinois, each for one year, prior to transferring to Virginia Tech for his junior year. While at Virginia Tech, he was named the most-improved defensive player before his junior season. He played ten games during the 1994 season, recording 41 tackles, five for losses and five sacks. He recorded three sacks against Arkansas State in his first game as a Hokie. He also played in a loss to Tennessee in the 1994 Gator Bowl. He also had 30 quarterback pressures, three tackles for loss and two sacks in 1995. As a senior, he started six games at defensive tackle and recorded 52 tackles, helping lead the Hokies to the Big East title and a win over Texas in the 1996 Sugar Bowl. He recorded a career-high 13 tackles and blocked a field goal in a win over Cincinnati. He also returned a fumble 46 yards for a touchdown in a win over Temple. He was also a Liberal arts major.

== Professional career ==
=== 1990s ===
Baron went unselected in the 1996 NFL draft, however he was signed by the Detroit Lions, and spent time in their training camp.

After not being able to make a team's roster in 1996, he signed with the Nashville Kats of the Arena Football League. As a rookie in 1997, he recorded six sacks and five more tackles for loss, as well as being named First-team All-Arena.

He recorded 23 total tackles, and also recorded five receptions, all but one for touchdowns. He caught his first-ever touchdown pass and recorded a sack and a tackle for loss on defense in home win over the New York Dragons. He recorded four tackles and a sack in loss to the Texas Terror. He recorded two sacks and a five-yard touchdown reception in a win over the Anaheim Piranhas. He led the Kats with seven tackles, two for losses, and a sack against the Milwaukee Mustangs. In the playoffs, he recorded a 15-yard touchdown reception and a tackle in a first-round loss to the Tampa Bay Storm.

After the AFL season was over, Baron signed with the Chicago Bears in October 1998, where he spent the season on the practice squad. In 1998, Baron was selected as a First-team All-Arena selection and the league's Lineman of the Year, in addition to chosen as the teams' Ironman of the Year. He had 14 tackles, four sacks, numerous quarterback hurries, five batted down passes, two forced fumbles and one fumble recovery for the season. He recorded five receptions on the season, three of which went for touchdowns, as the team's starting tight end, totaling 44 yards receiving. He blocked on the offensive line, helping to allow only five sacks all season, the second best total in the league. He caught his first pass of the season on the road against the Dragons, a two-yard touchdown pass from Andy Kelly. He caused two fumbles and had a sack in a home win over the Florida Bobcats.

In April 1999, Baron requested his release from the Bears to join the Kats for the 1999 season. In 1999, Baron was chosen as the Arena Football League Defensive Player of the Year Award winner after posting 11 tackles, five sacks, five batted down passes, a recovered fumble and a forced fumble. He recorded numerous quarterback hurries and knockdowns while drawing double coverage for most of the season. He was selected as a First team All-Arena lineman and named to the AFL All-Ironman team. He was selected as the Kats' co-Ironman of the Year, sharing the award with Darryl Hammond. Baron had nine receptions for 88 yards and a touchdown as a tight end on offense.

=== 2000s ===
In 2000, Baron was a Second-team All-Arena selection, recording 13 tackles and 3.5 sacks along with three batted-down passes, a forced fumble and a fumble recovery on defense. He also had five receptions for 35 yards and two for touchdowns, on the season. He was named the Kats' Ironman of the Year. He also blocked one field goal attempt on the season. He recorded a career-high 2.5 sacks and earned Ironman of the Game honors in a win over the Bobcats. Baron had one of the best outings of his career, in an ArenaBowl XIV loss at Orlando, including a leaping 28-yard touchdown catch and run, two sacks and tackle for loss. He was named the Ironman of the Game and also had an apparent interception return for a touchdown overturned when he was ruled to have Predators' quarterback Connell Maynor in the grasp before the ball was thrown. In 2001, Baron earned AFL Lineman of the Year honors for the second time after recording 11 tackles and six sacks. Earned First-team All-Arena honors and was a finalist for the Defensive Player of the Year and Ironman of the Year awards. He blocked a field goal attempt at home against Los Angeles, recovering it in the end zone for a touchdown. Baron's best overall game of the season came on the road against the Los Angeles Avengers, when he recorded 2.5 sacks, a forced fumble, a fumble recovery, a tackle, and a career-high four receptions for 14 yards, including an 11-yard touchdown reception. He was also the recipient of the Hero Award, which is given by the league to honor a player for his off-the-field contributions to his local community. At the 2001 ArenaBowl he was named to the AFL's 15th Anniversary All-Time team. After the 2001 season, the Nashville Kats folded and moved to Georgia and became the Georgia Force, and Baron left the team and signed with the Chicago Rush. In 2002, Baron was named First-team All-Arena after recording 18 tackles and three sacks in his first season with the Rush. The tackle total was his highest total since his rookie season. He was a finalist for the AFL Lineman of the Year award. He recorded his second career interception in his Rush debut on the road against the Indiana Firebirds. He recorded his first sack with the Rush against the Dragons, also recording his only touchdown reception of the season, in the game, a two-yard touchdown. Had one of his best games of the season against the Dallas Desperados, recording 2.5 tackles, two sacks and a forced fumble.

In 2003, Baron recorded 14 tackles and four sacks in 16 games. He also recorded three fumble recoveries, which tied for second-best in the league. He had the first blocked field goal attempt in Chicago Rush history in Dallas, the fourth blocked field goal attempt of his career. He recorded his fourth sack of the season on the road against the Carolina Cobras, also blocking an extra point that Cornelius Bonner returned for two points. He caught his only pass of the season for an 11-yard gain against the Arizona Rattlers. In 2004, he recorded 15 tackles and three sacks in 16 games. He also forced four fumbles and recovered one. He recorded a season-high 3.5 tackles, including one for loss, in Indiana. He played in his 116th career regular-season game in the season-finale against the Colorado Crush. On September 27, 2004, Baron became the restart Nashville Kats' first official player after he was traded from Chicago in exchange for three picks in the 2004 AFL Expansion Draft and a selection in the 2004 AFL Player Dispersal draft. In 2005, he, played in 14 games and totaled 11 tackles, four tackles for loss, three sacks, a broken up pass, a forced fumble and a fumble recovery. He also had one safety. He missed the first two games of the season with a foot injury, missing his first game after 131 consecutive games played in season opener on the road against the Columbus Destroyers.

In 2006, he recorded 16.5 tackles and three sacks in 16 games. He also had three tackles-for-loss, one forced fumble and two fumble recoveries. In 2007, he played in 12 games and recorded 10 tackles, 3.5 sacks, five passes-batted-down, and two blocked field goal attempts. After the season, he re-signed with the Rush after the Kats closed after a disappointing season. In 2008, he played in 13 games and recorded 13 tackles, five sacks, six passes-batted-down, and one blocked field goal attempt. He was released by the Rush on September 3, 2008.

== Outside football ==
Outside the AFL, Baron is very active in the community, working with many organizations in the Nashville and Chicago areas. He works with the YMCA and Boys and Girls Clubs in middle Tennessee. During the 2001 season, he donated $10,000 to the YMCA Urban Services program. He was recognized by the AFL for his participation in the YMCA's Li’l Sisters/Buffalo Soldiers program. He sponsored the Chicago Rush Team Zone at each home game during his three seasons in Chicago, paying for the tickets and bus transportation from Hammond, Indiana for various youth groups. He also serves as a volunteer and fundraiser for the Preston Taylor Center in Nashville, a center for at-risk youth that is co-operated by the YMCA and the Girls and Boys Club.

== Personal ==
Baron currently resides in Nashville, Tennessee during the off-season. He is the president of Everyday Entertainment.
