= List of Arena Football League seasons =

This is a list of Arena Football League seasons since the league started in 1987.

== 1980s ==
1987 | 1988 | 1989

== 1990s ==
1990 | 1991 | 1992 | 1993 | 1994 | 1995 | 1996 | 1997 | 1998 | 1999

== 2000s ==
2000 | 2001 | 2002 | 2003 | 2004 | 2005 | 2006 | 2007 | 2008 | 2009^{1}

== 2010s ==
2010 | 2011 | 2012 | 2013 | 2014 | 2015 | 2016 | 2017 | 2018 | 2019

== See also ==
- ArenaBowl

== Notes ==
1. The Arena Football League suspended operations in 2009, and no season took place.
