= Indiana Firebirds =

Arena football team

- Founded: 1990
- Folded: 2004
- Team history: Albany Firebirds (1990–2000); Indiana Firebirds (2001–2004)
- Based in: Indianapolis, Indiana at Conseco Fieldhouse
- Home arenas: Knickerbocker Arena (1990–2000); Conseco Fieldhouse (2001–2004)
- League: Arena Football League (1990–2004): National Conference (1993; 1995–2000); East (1995–2000); American Conference (1994; 2001–2004); Central (2001–2004)
- Colors: Black, royal blue, red, burnt orange, gold, white

Personnel
- Head coach: Mike Wilpolt
- General manager: Joe Hennessy; John Kolner
- Owners: Glenn Mazula; Dave Lageschulte

Championships
- League titles (1): 1999
- Division titles (6): Eastern: 1994, 1995, 1996, 1998, 1999, 2000

Playoff appearances (11)
- 1991, 1992, 1993, 1994, 1995, 1996, 1998, 1999, 2000, 2001, 2002

The Indiana Firebirds were a team in the Arena Football League. The team was based in Indianapolis, Indiana. Home games were played at the Conseco Fieldhouse, also the home of the Indiana Pacers of the National Basketball Association and Indiana Fever of the Women's National Basketball Association.

== History ==
=== Albany Firebirds (1990–2000) ===
The team was founded in Albany, New York as the Albany Firebirds, and played in Albany from 1990 to 2000. At that time, home games were played at the Knickerbocker Arena (now known as the MVP Arena). The team's original ownership group was headed by Joe O'Hara, owner of the Continental Basketball Association's Albany Patroons, who would later become the AFL's second commissioner. In 2020, he revealed that he originally wanted to call the team the Nighthawks, but league founder Jim Foster wanted that nickname for a future team he planned to own after his tenure as commissioner. After getting off the phone with Foster while in Boston, he happened to see a Pontiac Firebird driving down the highway and decided to go with that name.

The Firebirds were very successful during their tenure in Albany. They won six division titles, made nine playoff appearances, and won the 1999 ArenaBowl championship.

=== Indiana Firebirds (2001–2004) ===
On October 19, 2000, the Firebirds announced they would be relocating to Indianapolis. After the move, the Firebirds competed in the Central Division of the AFL's American Conference. The Firebirds were not as successful in Indianapolis as they were in Albany, missing the playoffs twice in four seasons after having made the playoffs in all but two of their first 11 seasons.

The 2004 Firebirds just missed the playoffs after a disappointing 0–5 start. However, they finished the season winning eight of their last eleven games and were considered by some a potential contender for the 2005 Arena Bowl championship led by 2004 Rookie of the Year quarterback Zachary Paget.

However, in early September 2004, Firebirds owner Dave Lageschulte announced that his company, Lags Football LLC, would cease all business operations for the Firebirds. Lageschulte had been actively, but unsuccessfully, pursuing local investors to purchase the Firebirds since he had assumed ownership in 2002.

On September 20, 2004, the date of the announced sales deadline, the Arena Football League announced the termination of the Firebirds franchise and that the players would be made available to continuing AFL teams in a dispersal draft. However, within the week the team was purchased by Scott and Todd Hines, who run H3 Sportsgear, a sportsgear company based in Indianapolis. With AFL approval, it was hoped that the Firebirds could remain operational in Indianapolis. However, this bid floundered due to concerns that the low sale price would devalue the worth of the other 18 franchises. The former Firebirds players were made available in the dispersal draft conducted on October 14, 2004, marking the end of one of the AFL's longest-running franchises.

=== Resurrection of the Albany Firebirds name ===
After the move of the Albany Firebirds AFL franchise to Indiana, an AF2 team called the Albany Conquest took to the field to replace the arena football void left by the departure of the Firebirds. After eight seasons and troubles with fielding a winning team in recent seasons, Conquest owner Walter Robb contemplated shutting down the Conquest franchise. Then, on Friday, October 3, 2008, Robb announced the return of the team for the 2009 season but renamed as the Albany Firebirds in the hopes of "re-branding" the team.

Multiple reports in late September 2023 indicated that a team bearing the Albany Firebirds brand would play in the 2024 season. Ownership would not confirm nor deny the reports but stated that there would be an arena football team in Albany in 2024, either in the revived AFL or the Indoor Football League. On October 2, 2023, the Albany Firebirds were officially announced to be joining the AFL.

== Season-by-season ==
Season records
Season	W	L	T	Finish	Playoff results
Albany Firebirds
1990	3	5	0	5th	–
1991	6	4	0	4th	Lost Week 1 (Detroit 37–35)
1992	5	5	0	3rd Northern	Lost Week 1 (Dallas 48–45)
1993	5	7	0	5th NC	Lost Week 1 (Tampa Bay 48–34)
1994	10	2	0	1st NC	Won Week 1 (Las Vegas 49–30); Lost Week 2 (Arizona 40–33)
1995	7	5	0	1st NC Eastern	Won Week 1 (St. Louis 51–49); Lost Week 2 (Tampa Bay 56–49)
1996	10	4	0	1st NC Eastern	Won Week 1 (Milwaukee 70–58); Lost Week 2 (Iowa 62–55)
1997	6	8	0	3rd NC Eastern	–
1998	10	4	0	1st NC Eastern	Lost Week 1 (New Jersey 66–59)
1999	11	3	0	1st NC Eastern	Won Week 1 (Grand Rapids 55–45); Won Week 2 (Arizona 73–47); Won ArenaBowl XIII (Orlando 59–48)
2000	9	5	0	1st NC Eastern	Lost Week 2 (Arizona 53–50)
Indiana Firebirds
2001	9	5	0	2nd AC Central	Won Week 1 (Carolina 58–41); Won Week 2 (Tampa Bay 68–31); Lost Week 3 (Grand Rapids 83–70)
2002	7	7	0	3rd AC Central	Lost Week 1 (Dallas 47–46)
2003	6	10	0	4th AC Central	–
2004	8	8	0	3rd AC Central	–
Totals	121	91	0	(including playoffs)	

== Notable players ==
=== Arena Football Hall of Famers ===
Albany/Indiana Firebirds Hall of Famers
No.	Name	Year Inducted	Position(s)	Years w/ Firebirds
77	Sylvester Bembery	2011	OL/DL	1994–2003
17	Eddie Brown	2011	OS	1994–2003
–	Mike Dailey	2012	Head Coach	1997–2003
84	Fred Gayles	2002	WR/DB	1990–1997
?	Darryl Hammond	2013	WR/LB	1991–1994
–	Mike Hohensee	2012	Head Coach	1994–1996
82	Greg Hopkins	2013	WR/LB	1996–2001
–	Glenn Mazula	2000	Owner	1990–2002
?	Reggie Smith	2002	OS	1990
?	Durwood Roquemore	1999	WR/DB	1991

=== Individual awards ===
AFL MVP
Season	Player	Position
1994	Eddie Brown	OS

AFL Offensive Player of the Year
Season	Player	Position
1996	Eddie Brown	OS
1999	Eddie Brown	OS

AFL Defensive Player of the Year
Season	Player	Position
1996	David McLeod	WR/DB

Kicker of the Year
Season	Player	Position
1996	Pete Elezovic	K
2003	Clay Rush	K

Ironman of the Year
Season	Player	Position
1998	Chad Dukes	FB/LB

AFL Rookie of the Year
Season	Player	Position
2004	Adrian McPherson	QB

=== All-Arena players ===
The following Firebirds players were named to All-Arena Teams:

- QB Tom Porras (1), Mike Perez (2), Mike Pawlawski (1)
- FB/LB Chad Dukes (2), Leroy Thompson (1)
- WR/DB Reggie Smith (1), Fred Gayles (1), Merv Mosely (2), David McLeod (1), Jay Jones (1), Evan Hlavacek (1)
- WR/LB Fred Gayles (1), Greg Hopkins (2)
- OL/DL Sylvester Bembery (3), Kevin Murphy (1), Jerome Brown (1), Joe Jacobs (3), Jon Krick (1), Chris Snyder (1), Kyle Moore-Brown (1)
- OS/KR Reggie Smith (1)
- OS Eddie Brown (4)
- DS Derek Stingley (1), Cornelius Coe (1)
- K Gary Gussman (1), Franco Grilla (1), Pete Elezovic (1), Clay Rush (1)

=== All-Ironman players ===
The following Firebirds players were named to All-Ironman Teams:

- FB/LB Chad Dukes (1), Rich Young (1)
- WR/DB Evan Hlavacek (1)
- WR/LB Greg Hopkins (2)
- OL/DL Joe Jacobs (2), Chris Snyder (1)

=== All-Rookie players ===
The following Firebirds players were named to All-Rookie Teams:

- QB Adrian McPherson
- FB/LB Van Johnson
- WR/DB Brett Bech
- DS Cornelius Coe

== Head coaches ==
Name	Term	Regular season				Playoffs		Awards
Name	Term	W	L	T	Win%	W	L	Awards
Rick Buffington	1990–1993	19	21	0	.475	0	3	
Mike Hohensee	1994–1996	27	11	0	.711	2	2	
Mike Dailey	1997–2003	58	42	0	.580	5	4	Coach of the Year (1999)
Steve DeBerg	2004	0	5	0	.000	0	0	
Mike Wilpolt	2004	8	3	0	.727	0	0	

== Former radio affiliates (6 stations) ==
- WPTR/1540: Albany (1990–1991 seasons), (1993–1994 seasons)
- WROW/590: Albany (1995–2000 seasons)
- WHUC/1230: Hudson (1994 season)
- WSRD/104.9: Johnstown (1994 season)
- WSTL/1410: South Glens Falls (1994 season)
- WCDA/96.3: Voorheesville (1992 season)
