= ArenaBowl XIII =

Orlando Predators (#8)	Albany Firebirds (#3)
48	59
	1	2	3	4	Total
ORL	14	7	13	14	48
ALB	21	17	0	21	59
- Date: August 21, 1999
- Stadium: Times Union Center; Albany, New York
- MVP: Eddie Brown, WR/DB, Albany: Barry Wagner, WR/DB, Orlando (Ironman of the Game)
- Attendance: 13,652
- Winning coach: Mike Dailey
- Losing coach: Jay Gruden

TV in the United States
- Network: ABC
- Announcers: Mike Gleason, Merril Hoge, and Holly Rowe

Arena Bowl XIII was the 1999 edition of the Arena Football League's championship game. The game was played on August 21, 1999, at the Firebirds' home arena, MVP Arena (then known as the Pepsi Arena). The title game featured the #8 Orlando Predators and the #3 Albany Firebirds (both from the National Conference). The Predators were coming off their first Arena Bowl title, while the game was the Firebirds' first appearance in 10 seasons.

== Game summary ==
In the first quarter, the Firebirds took flight first with QB Mike Pawlawski completing a 12-yard TD pass to OS Eddie Brown. The Predators responded with QB Connell Maynor completing a 22-yard TD pass to WR–DB Barry Wagner. Albany would reply with a 1-yard TD run by FB/LB Jon Krick. Orlando bounced back with Maynor completing a 37-yard TD pass to WR–LB Ty Law. The Firebirds answered again with Pawlawski completing a 2-yard TD pass to WR–DB Van Johnson.

In the second quarter, the Predators came back to tie with Maynor and Wagner hooking up with each other again on a 22-yard TD pass. Albany took over for the rest of the quarter with Pawlawski completing a 6-yard TD pass to WR/LB Greg Hopkins, along with hooking up with Brown again on a 29-yard TD pass. Kicker Don Silvertri helped the Firebirds wrap up the half with an 18-yard field goal.

In the third quarter, Orlando began to come back as Maynor hooked up with OS Elliot Jackson on a 33-yard TD pass and a 34-yard TD pass.

In the fourth quarter, Albany replied with Pawlawski and Brown hooking up with each other on a 14-yard TD pass. The Predators kept pace with a 4-yard TD run by FB/LB Tommy Dorsey, with Maynor running into the endzone for the two-point conversion. The Firebirds responded with Pawlawski and Brown hooking up with each other once again on a 5-yard TD pass. Orlando immediately responded with Maynor and Jackson hooking up with each other on a 39-yard TD pass, yet the PAT failed. Albany wrapped up the game with Pawlawski completing a 6-yard TD pass to Krick.

With a 59-48 win, the Firebirds ended up with a red-hot Arena Bowl championship title. After the final whistle, the home town fans rush the field. Fans could be heard chanting “We’re #1 “ “Arena Bowl” and “Toe Tap” during the wild celebration.

== Scoring summary ==
First quarter

- ALB - Pawlawski 12 pass to Brown (Silvestri kick)
- ORL - Maynor 22 pass to Wagner (Cool kick)
- ALB - Krick 1 run (Silverstri kick)
- ORL - Maynor 37 pass to Law (Cool kick)
- ALB - Pawlawski 2 pass to Johnson (Silverstri kick)

Second quarter

- ORL - Maynor 22 pass to Wagner (Cool kick)
- ALB - Pawlawski 6 pass to Hopkins (Silverstri kick)
- ALB - Pawlawski 29 pass to Brown (Silverstri kick)
- ALB - FG Silvestri 18

Third quarter

- ORL - Maynor 33 pass to Jackson (Cool kick)
- ORL - Maynor 34 pass to Jackson (Cool kick failed)
- ALB - Pawlawski 14 pass to Brown (Silverstri kick)

Fourth quarter

- ORL - Dorsey 4 run (Maynor rush)
- ALB - Pawlawski 5 pass to Brown (Silverstri kick)
- ORL - Maynor 39 pass to Jackson (Cool kick failed)
- ALB - Pawlawski 6 pass to Krick (Silverstri kick)
