= 1999 Arena Football League season =

- League: Arena Football League
- Sport: Arena football
- Duration: April 23, 1999 – August 21, 1999

ArenaBowl XIII
- Champions: Albany Firebirds
- Runners-up: Orlando Predators
- Finals MVP: Eddie Brown, ALB

AFL seasons
- ← 1998 2000 →

National: Eastern, Southern
American: Western, Central

The 1999 Arena Football League season was the 13th season of the Arena Football League. It was succeeded by 2000. The league champions were the Albany Firebirds, who defeated the Orlando Predators in ArenaBowl XIII.

== Standings ==
Team	Overall			Division		
Team	Wins	Losses	Percentage	Wins	Losses	Percentage
National Conference
Eastern Division
Albany Firebirds	11	3	0.786	5	1	0.833
New Jersey Red Dogs	6	8	0.429	5	1	0.833
New England Sea Wolves	5	9	0.357	2	4	0.333
Buffalo Destroyers	1	13	0.071	0	6	0.000
Southern Division
Tampa Bay Storm	11	3	0.786	6	0	1.000
Nashville Kats	8	6	0.571	3	3	0.500
Orlando Predators	7	7	0.500	3	3	0.500
Florida Bobcats	3	11	0.214	0	6	0.000
American Conference
Central Division
Iowa Barnstormers	11	3	0.786	4	2	0.667
Grand Rapids Rampage	8	6	0.571	4	2	0.667
Milwaukee Mustangs	7	7	0.500	2	4	0.333
Houston Thunderbears	4	10	0.286	2	4	0.333
Western Division
Arizona Rattlers	10	4	0.714	2	2	0.500
Portland Forest Dragons	7	7	0.500	2	2	0.500
San Jose SaberCats	6	8	0.429	2	2	0.500

- Green indicates clinched playoff berth
- Purple indicates division champion
- Grey indicates best regular season record

== Playoffs ==
Quarterfinals
1	Tampa Bay	19
8	Orlando	41
2	Iowa	66
7	Milwaukee	34
3	Albany	55
6	Grand Rapids	45
4	Arizona	34
5	Nashville	30

Semifinals
8	Orlando	48
2	Iowa	41
3	Albany	73
4	Arizona	47

ArenaBowl XIII
8	Orlando	48
3	Albany	59

== All-Arena team ==
Position	First team	Second team
Quarterback	Mike Pawlawski, Albany	Craig Kusick, Grand Rapids
Fullback/Linebacker	Andre Bowden, Tampa Bay	Bob McMillen, Arizona
Wide receiver/Defensive back	Carlos James, Iowa; Darryl Hammond, Nashville	Melvin Cunningham, Tampa Bay; Randy Gatewood, Arizona
Wide receiver/Linebacker	Gary Compton, Milwaukee	Hunkie Cooper, Arizona
Offensive specialist	Eddie Brown, Albany	Steve Papin, San Jose
Offensive lineman/Defensive lineman	Robert Stewart, New Jersey; James Baron, Nashville; Joe Jacobs, Albany	Jon Krick, Albany; Willie Wyatt, Tampa Bay; Rich McKenzie, Orlando
Defensive specialist	Cecil Doggette, Arizona; Derek Stingley, Albany	Shea Showers, Iowa; Mark Ricks, Portland
Kicker	Mike Black, New England	Daron Alcorn, Portland
