= 1997 Arena Football League season =

- League: Arena Football League
- Sport: Arena football
- Duration: May 1, 1997 – August 25, 1997

ArenaBowl XI
- Champions: Arizona Rattlers
- Runners-up: Iowa Barnstormers
- Finals MVP: Donnie Davis, ARZ

AFL seasons
- ← 1996 1998 →

National: Eastern, Southern
American: Western, Central

The 1997 Arena Football League season was the 11th season of the Arena Football League. It was succeeded by 1998. The league champions were the Arizona Rattlers, who defeated the Iowa Barnstormers in ArenaBowl XI.

== Standings ==
Team	Overall			Division		
Team	Wins	Losses	Percentage	Wins	Losses	Percentage
National Conference
Eastern Division
Nashville Kats	10	4	0.714	5	1	0.833
New Jersey Red Dogs	9	5	0.643	4	2	0.667
Albany Firebirds	6	8	0.429	2	4	0.333
New York CityHawks	2	12	0.143	1	5	0.167
Southern Division
Orlando Predators	10	4	0.714	4	0	1.000
Tampa Bay Storm	8	6	0.571	2	2	0.500
Florida Bobcats	4	10	0.286	0	4	0.000
American Conference
Central Division
Iowa Barnstormers	11	3	0.786	6	0	1.000
Milwaukee Mustangs	8	6	0.571	3	3	0.500
Texas Terror	6	8	0.429	2	4	0.333
Portland Forest Dragons	2	12	0.143	1	5	0.167
Western Division
Arizona Rattlers	12	2	0.857	4	0	1.000
San Jose SaberCats	8	6	0.571	2	2	0.500
Anaheim Piranhas	2	12	0.143	0	4	0.000

- Green indicates clinched playoff berth
- Purple indicates division champion
- Grey indicates best regular season record

== Playoffs ==
Quarterfinals
1	Arizona	46
8	Milwaukee	29
3	Nashville	49
6	Tampa Bay	52
2	Iowa	68
7	San Jose	59
4	Orlando	45
5	New Jersey	37

Semifinals
1	Arizona (OT)	49
6	Tampa Bay	46
2	Iowa	52
4	Orlando	34

ArenaBowl XI
1	Arizona	55
2	Iowa	33

== All-Arena team ==
Position	First team	Second team
Quarterback	Kurt Warner, Iowa	Sherdrick Bonner, Arizona
Fullback/Linebacker	Chad Dukes, Albany	Paul McGowan, Orlando
Wide receiver/Defensive back	Barry Wagner, Orlando; Randy Gatewood, Arizona	Alvin Ashley, New Jersey; Carlos James, Iowa
Wide receiver/Linebacker	Cory Fleming, Nashville	Hunkie Cooper, Arizona
Offensive specialist	Calvin Schexnayder, Arizona	Lamart Cooper, Iowa
Offensive lineman/Defensive lineman	Carlos Fowler, Texas; James Baron, Nashville; Willie Wyatt, Tampa Bay	Al Noga, San Jose; Victor Hall, Orlando; Robert Stewart, New Jersey
Defensive specialist	Tracey Perkins, Tampa Bay; Chris Barber, Orlando	Rodney Mazion, Anaheim; Jamie Coleman, Nashville
Kicker	Steve Videtich, New Jersey	Daron Alcorn, Portland
