= 1998 Arena Football League season =

- League: Arena Football League
- Sport: Arena football
- Duration: May 1, 1998 – August 23, 1998

ArenaBowl XII
- Champions: Orlando Predators
- Runners-up: Tampa Bay Storm
- Finals MVP: Rick Hamilton, ORL

AFL seasons
- ← 1997 1999 →

National: Eastern, Southern
American: Western, Central

The 1998 Arena Football League season was the 12th season of the Arena Football League. It was succeeded by 1999. The league champions were the Orlando Predators, who defeated the Tampa Bay Storm in ArenaBowl XII.

== Standings ==
Team	Overall			Division		
Team	Wins	Losses	Percentage	Wins	Losses	Percentage
National Conference
Eastern Division
Albany Firebirds	10	4	0.714	2	2	0.500
New Jersey Red Dogs	8	6	0.571	3	1	0.750
New York CityHawks	3	11	0.214	1	3	0.250
Southern Division
Tampa Bay Storm	12	2	0.857	4	2	0.667
Orlando Predators	9	5	0.643	3	3	0.500
Nashville Kats	9	5	0.643	5	1	0.833
Florida Bobcats	3	11	0.214	0	6	0.000
American Conference
Central Division
Houston Thunderbears	8	6	0.571	6	0	1.000
Milwaukee Mustangs	7	7	0.500	4	2	0.667
Iowa Barnstormers	5	9	0.357	1	5	0.167
Grand Rapids Rampage	3	11	0.214	1	5	0.167
Western Division
Arizona Rattlers	10	4	0.714	4	0	1.000
San Jose SaberCats	7	7	0.500	2	2	0.500
Portland Forest Dragons	4	10	0.286	0	4	0.000

- Green indicates clinched playoff berth
- Purple indicates division champion
- Grey indicates best regular season record

== Playoffs ==
Quarterfinals
1	Tampa Bay	65
8	San Jose	46
2	Albany	59
7	New Jersey	66
3	Arizona	50
6	Houston	36
4	Orlando	58
5	Nashville	43

Semifinals
1	Tampa Bay	49
7	New Jersey	23
3	Arizona	33
4	Orlando	38

ArenaBowl XII
1	Tampa Bay	31
4	Orlando	62

== All-Arena team ==
Position	First team	Second team
Quarterback	Sherdrick Bonner, Arizona	Peter Tom Willis, Tampa Bay
Fullback/Linebacker	Chad Dukes, Albany	Les Barley, Tampa Bay
Wide receiver/Defensive back	Alvin Ashley, New Jersey; Rodney Blackshear, Houston	Carlos James, Iowa; Brian Greene, Portland
Wide receiver/Linebacker	Cory Fleming, Nashville	Greg Hopkins, Albany
Offensive specialist	Calvin Schexnayder, Arizona	Eddie Brown, Albany
Offensive lineman/Defensive lineman	Joe Jacobs, Albany; James Baron, Nashville; Willie Wyatt, Tampa Bay	Sam Hernandez, San Jose; Ernest Allen, Milwaukee; Robert Stewart, New Jersey
Defensive specialist	Johnnie Harris, Tampa Bay; Corey Johnson, Nashville	Chris Barber, Orlando; Tommy Jones, San Jose
Kicker	Kenny Stucker, Milwaukee	Steve Videtich, New Jersey
