= 2001 Arena Football League season =

- League: Arena Football League
- Sport: Arena football
- Duration: April 13, 2001 – August 19, 2001

ArenaBowl XV
- Champions: Grand Rapids Rampage
- Runners-up: Nashville Kats
- Finals MVP: Terrill Shaw, GRA

AFL seasons
- ← 2000 2002 →

National: Eastern, Southern
American: Western, Central

The 2001 Arena Football League season was the 15th season of the Arena Football League. The league champions were the Grand Rapids Rampage, who defeated the Nashville Kats in ArenaBowl XV.

== Relocation ==
- The New England Seawolves was purchased by TD Securities and were relocated to Toronto to become the Toronto Phantoms.
- On October 19, 2000, the Albany Firebirds announced they were relocating the Indianapolis.
- On November 1, 2000, the Iowa Barnstormers announced that they relocated to New York to become the New York Dragons.

== Standings ==
Team	Overall			Division		
Team	Wins	Losses	Percentage	Wins	Losses	Percentage
National Conference
Eastern Division
Toronto Phantoms	8	6	0.571	7	1	0.875
New York Dragons	8	6	0.571	4	4	0.500
Carolina Cobras	7	7	0.500	5	3	0.625
Buffalo Destroyers	6	8	0.429	4	4	0.500
New Jersey Gladiators	2	12	0.143	0	8	0.000
Southern Division
Nashville Kats	10	4	0.714	4	2	0.667
Tampa Bay Storm	10	4	0.714	3	3	0.500
Orlando Predators	8	6	0.571	3	3	0.500
Florida Bobcats	6	8	0.429	2	4	0.333
American Conference
Central Division
Grand Rapids Rampage	11	3	0.786	6	2	0.750
Indiana Firebirds	9	5	0.643	4	4	0.500
Detroit Fury	7	7	0.500	5	3	0.625
Chicago Rush	7	7	0.500	3	5	0.375
Milwaukee Mustangs	3	11	0.214	2	6	0.250
Western Division
San Jose SaberCats	10	4	0.714	7	1	0.833
Arizona Rattlers	8	6	0.571	5	3	0.625
Los Angeles Avengers	5	9	0.357	4	4	0.500
Oklahoma Wranglers	5	9	0.357	3	5	0.375
Houston Thunderbears	3	11	0.214	1	7	0.125

- Green indicates clinched playoff berth
- Purple indicates division champion
- Grey indicates best regular season record

== Playoffs ==
Wild Card Round
6	Orlando	26
11	Chicago	41
5	Indiana	58
12	Carolina	41
8	Toronto	64
9	New York	57
7	Arizona	52
10	Detroit	44

Quarterfinals
1	Grand Rapids	53
11	Chicago	21
4	Tampa Bay	31
5	Indiana	68
2	Nashville	45
8	Toronto	38
3	San Jose	68
7	Arizona	49

Semifinals
1	Grand Rapids	83
5	Indiana	70
2	Nashville	71
3	San Jose	47

ArenaBowl XV
1	Grand Rapids	64
2	Nashville	42

== All-Arena team ==
Position	First team	Second team
Quarterback	Aaron Garcia, New York	Clint Dolezel, Grand Rapids
Fullback/Linebacker	Andre Bowden, Tampa Bay	Rupert Grant, Nashville
Wide receiver/Defensive back	Dameon Porter, Chicago; Jarrick Hillery, Nashville	Jay Jones, Indiana; Charlie Davidson, Toronto
Wide receiver/Linebacker	Gary Compton, Milwaukee	Michael Baker, Grand Rapids
Offensive specialist	Kevin Swayne, New York	James Bowden, Tampa Bay
Offensive lineman/Defensive lineman	James Baron, Nashville; Robert Stewart, New York; R-Kal Truluck, Detroit	Ernest Allen, Orlando; Joe Jacobs, San Jose; Rod Williams, Tampa Bay
Defensive specialist	Kenny McEntyre, Orlando; Mark Ricks, Los Angeles	Damon Mason, Orlando; Cornelius Coe, Indiana
Kicker	Mike Black, Tampa Bay	Brian Gowins, Grand Rapids
