= Specialist (arena football) =

In arena football, a specialist was a player, other than a quarterback or placekicker, who was exempt from the league's one-platoon system ("Iron Man"). Under the original Arena football system, six of the eight players on each team were required to play both offense and defense.

One of the two offensive positions was required to be a quarterback or, in the event of a kick, a placekicker. The other was known as an offensive specialist (OS). Offensive specialists usually played wide receiver, either as a flanker or a slotback. The defense was allowed two defensive specialists (DS), who almost universally played in the secondary. Players were referred to as "specialists" instead of their more traditional positional designations (example, a player would be called a defensive specialist and be designated as "DS" on a position chart, instead of a cornerback or CB).

Specialists were usually required to participate on special teams, a requirement that was not extended to quarterbacks.

The specialist designation was eliminated after both the Arena Football League and af2 abandoned the one-platoon system prior to the 2007 season. Most other indoor football leagues have used free substitution since their inception.
