= 2000 Arena Football League season =

- League: Arena Football League
- Sport: Arena football
- Duration: April 13, 2000 – August 20, 2000

ArenaBowl XIV
- Champions: Orlando Predators
- Runners-up: Nashville Kats
- Finals MVP: Connell Maynor, ORL

AFL seasons
- ← 1999 2001 →

National: Eastern, Southern
American: Western, Central

The 2000 Arena Football League season was the 14th season of the Arena Football League. It was succeeded by 2001. The league champions were the Orlando Predators, who defeated the Nashville Kats in ArenaBowl XIV.

The season was originally cancelled on February 24, 2000, due to an antitrust suit filed by the Arena Football League Players Association against the league stemming from player complaints that league owners have conspired to withhold free agency, health benefits and higher salaries. On March 1, 2000, the league re-opened its season when the Players' Union came to a collective bargaining agreement with the league.

== Standings ==
Team	Overall			Division		
Team	Wins	Losses	Percentage	Wins	Losses	Percentage
National Conference
Eastern Division
Albany Firebirds	9	5	0.643	4	2	0.667
New England Sea Wolves	8	6	0.571	5	1	0.833
Buffalo Destroyers	5	9	0.357	2	4	0.333
New Jersey Red Dogs	4	10	0.286	1	5	0.167
Southern Division
Orlando Predators	11	3	0.786	6	2	0.750
Nashville Kats	9	5	0.643	5	3	0.625
Tampa Bay Storm	8	6	0.571	6	2	0.750
Florida Bobcats	3	11	0.214	3	5	0.375
Carolina Cobras	3	11	0.214	0	8	0.000
American Conference
Central Division
Iowa Barnstormers	9	5	0.643	5	1	0.833
Milwaukee Mustangs	7	7	0.500	2	4	0.333
Grand Rapids Rampage	6	8	0.429	3	3	0.500
Houston Thunderbears	3	11	0.214	2	4	0.333
Western Division
San Jose SaberCats	12	2	0.857	4	2	0.667
Arizona Rattlers	12	2	0.857	5	1	0.833
Oklahoma Wranglers	7	7	0.500	3	3	0.500
Los Angeles Avengers	3	11	0.214	0	6	0.000

- Green indicates clinched playoff berth
- Purple indicates division champion
- Grey indicates best regular-season record

== Playoffs ==
Wild Card Round
7	New England	38
10	Oklahoma	52
6	Nashville	57
11	Grand Rapids	14
8	Tampa Bay	72
9	Milwaukee	64
5	Arizona	41
12	Buffalo	34

Quarterfinals
1	San Jose	63
10	Oklahoma	40
3	Iowa	56
6	Nashville	63
2	Orlando	34
8	Tampa Bay	24
4	Albany	50
5	Arizona	53

Semifinals
1	San Jose	42
6	Nashville	51
2	Orlando	56
5	Arizona	44

ArenaBowl XIV
6	Nashville	38
2	Orlando	41

== All-Arena team ==
Position	First team	Second team
Quarterback	Aaron Garcia, Iowa	Sherdrick Bonner, Arizona
Fullback/Linebacker	Bob McMillen, Arizona	Rick Hamilton, Orlando
Wide receiver/Defensive back	Carlos James, Iowa; Bret Cooper, Orlando	Randy Gatewood, Arizona; Sean Riley, Milwaukee
Wide receiver/Linebacker	Hunkie Cooper, Arizona	Greg Hopkins, Albany
Offensive specialist	Mike Horacek, Iowa	Steve Papin, San Jose
Offensive lineman/Defensive lineman	Sam Hernandez, San Jose; Victor Hall, Los Angeles; Joe Jacobs, Albany	James Baron, Nashville; B.J. Cohen, Orlando; Tom Briggs, Oklahoma
Defensive specialist	Kenny McEntyre, Orlando; Kevin Kaesviharn, Iowa	Damon Mason, Orlando; Tommy Henry, Tampa Bay
Kicker	Clay Rush, Iowa	Steve Videtich, Milwaukee
