= 2007 Los Angeles Avengers season =

Arena Football League team season

- Head coach: Ed Hodgkiss
- Home stadium: Staples Center

Results
- Record: 9–7
- Division place: 2nd
- Playoffs: L 52–20 vs. Chicago

The 2007 Los Angeles Avengers season was the eighth season for the franchise. The Avengers began their season, trying to improve on their 5–11 record from 2006. Their 9–7 record allowed them to clinch their first playoff spot since they won the division in 2005. After defeating the Utah Blaze 64–42, they lost 52–20 to the Chicago Rush in the divisional round. This was the final playoff appearance for the Avengers.

== Season schedule ==
Week	Date	Opponent	Home/Away	Result
1	March 4	San Jose SaberCats	Home	L 66–58
2	March 12	Orlando Predators	Away	W 44–37
3		Bye		
4	March 24	New Orleans VooDoo	Away	W 48–36
5	April 1	Chicago Rush	Away	L 66–31
6	April 6	Arizona Rattlers	Home	W 64–45
7	April 13	Utah Blaze	Away	L 76–63
8	April 21	San Jose SaberCats	Away	L 73–49
9	April 28	Grand Rapids Rampage	Home	W 75–71
10	May 6	Las Vegas Gladiators	Away	W 59–37
11	May 12	Tampa Bay Storm	Home	L 40–37
12	May 19	Georgia Force	Home	W 57–51
13	May 26	Kansas City Brigade	Away	L 62–56
14	June 2	Chicago Rush	Home	W 50–47
15	June 11	Arizona Rattlers	Away	W 55–52
16	June 17	Las Vegas Gladiators	Home	W 60–42
17	June 23	Utah Blaze	Home	L 47–37

== Playoff schedule ==
Round	Date	Opponent	Home/Away	Result
1	July 2	(5) Utah Blaze	Home	W 64–42
2	July 9	(2) Chicago Rush	Away	L 52–20

== Coaching ==
Ed Hodgkiss is the head coach of the Avengers this season.

== Stats ==
=== Offense ===
==== Quarterback ====
Player	Comp.	Att.	Comp%	Yards	TD's	INT's	Long	Rating
Sonny Cumbie	378	610	62	4370	83	13	47	108.7
Tim Hicks	13	20	65	172	4	1	29	110.8

==== Running backs ====
Player	Car.	Yards	Avg.	TD's	Long
Lonnie Ford	82	192	2.3	19	20
Sonny Cumbie	20	10	0.5	2	5
Josh Jeffries	4	6	1.5	0	5
Rob Turner	4	6	1.5	0	6
Tim Hicks	1	5	5	0	5
Lenzie Jackson	3	4	1.3	3	2
Robert Quiroga	4	4	1	0	3
LaShaun Ward	4	2	0.5	0	2
Kevin Ingram	1	−1	−1	0	−1

==== Wide receivers ====
Player	Rec.	Yards	Avg.	TD's	Long
Rob Turner	105	1229	11.7	24	37
Kevin Ingram	103	1196	11.6	26	39
Lenzie Jackson	83	903	10.9	12	39
LaShaun Ward	41	561	13.7	9	43
Terrence Stubbs	23	242	10.5	3	29
Robert Quiroga	21	235	11.2	11	27
Nichiren Flowers	6	125	20.8	1	47
Lonnie Ford	6	24	4	0	13
Remy Hamilton	1	12	12	0	12
Branden Hall	1	11	11	1	11
Josh Jeffries	1	4	4	0	4

==== Touchdowns ====
Player	TD's	Rush	Rec	Ret	Pts
Kevin Ingram	27	0	26	1	162
Rob Turner	24	0	24	0	144
Lonnie Ford	19	19	0	0	114
Lenzie Jackson	15	3	12	0	96
Robert Quiroga	11	0	11	0	72
LaShaun Ward	9	0	9	0	54
Terrence Stubbs	3	0	3	0	18
Sonny Cumble	2	2	0	0	12
Nichiren Flowers	1	0	1	0	6
Branden Hall	1	0	1	0	6

=== Defense ===
Player	Tackles	Solo	Assisted	Sack	Solo	Assisted	INT	Yards	TD's	Long
Eddie Canonico	101	89	24	0	0	0	1	20	0	20
Terrance Joseph	68.5	60	17	0	0	0	0	0	0	0
Damen Wheeler	60	52	16	0	0	0	6	28	0	13
Robert Quiroga	49.5	40	19	0	0	0	0	0	0	0
James Bethea	40.5	34	13	0	0	0	0	0	0	0
Arnold Parker	37.5	34	7	0	0	0	0	0	0	0
LaShaun Ward	34	29	10	0	0	0	1	5	0	5
Brandon Perkins	31	21	20	0	0	0	1	0	0	0
Silas Demary	25	18	14	8	8	0	1	3	0	3
Jason Stewart	22	14	16	4.5	4	1	1	24	1	24
Reggie Rhodes	18	15	6	4	4	0	0	0	0	0
Remy Hamilton	13.5	12	3	0	0	0	0	0	0	0
Josh Jeffries	13.5	8	11	1.5	1	1	0	0	0	0
Jon Apgar	12	7	10	0	0	0	0	0	0	0
Kevin Ingram	12	10	4	0	0	0	0	0	0	0
Lenzie Jackson	6	6	0	0	0	0	0	0	0	0
Lonnie Ford	5.5	4	3	0	0	0	0	0	0	0
Rob Turner	5.5	5	1	0	0	0	0	0	0	0
Michael Craven	4	4	0	0	0	0	0	0	0	0
Rushen Jones	3	3	0	0	0	0	0	0	0	0
Branden Hall	2.5	2	1	0	0	0	0	0	0	0
Matt McGhghy	2	2	0	0	0	0	0	0	0	0
Sean McNamara	2	2	0	0	0	0	0	0	0	0
Terrence Stubbs	2	1	2	0	0	0	0	0	0	0
Greg Krause	1	1	0	0	0	0	0	0	0	0

=== Special teams ===
==== Kick return ====
Player	Ret	Yards	TD's	Long	Avg	Ret	Yards	TD's	Long	Avg
LaShaun Ward	41	648	0	29	15.8	1	18	0	19	19
Kevin Ingram	24	361	1	41	15	2	14	0	14	7
Terrence Stubbs	11	203	0	35	18.5	1	14	0	14	14
James Bethea	3	43	0	23	14.3	0	0	0	0	0
Robert Quiroga	3	41	0	18	13.7	1	1	0	1	1
Damen Wheeler	7	36	0	18	5.1	0	0	0	0	0
Terrance Joseph	1	29	0	20	20	1	0	0	0	0
Lenzie Jackson	3	19	0	9	6.3	0	0	0	0	0
Josh Jeffries	1	0	0	0	0	0	0	0	0	0

==== Kicking ====
Player	Extra pt.	Extra pt. Att.	FG	FGA	Long	Pct.	Pts
Remy Hamilton	101	114	16	30	36	0.533	149

== Playoff Stats ==
=== Offense ===
==== Quarterback ====
Player	Comp.	Att.	Comp%	Yards	TD's	INT's
Sonny Cumbie	52	87	59.7	563	10	1

==== Running backs ====
Player	Car.	Yards	Avg.	TD's
Josh Jeffries	7	20	2.8	2

==== Wide receivers ====
Player	Rec.	Yards	Avg.	TD's
Rob Turner	16	171	10.6	4
Lenzie Jackson	16	171	10.6	0
Kevin Ingram	13	135	10.3	1
Robert Quiroga	3	16	5.3	2
Terrence Stubbs	2	12	6	0
Josh Jeffries	3	58	19.3	3

=== Special teams ===
==== Kick return ====
Player	Ret	Yards	Avg	Long
Terrence Stubbs	4	68	17	21
Kevin Ingram	5	68	13.6	20

==== Kicking ====
Player	Extra pt.	Extra pt. Att.	FG	FGA	Long	Pts
Remy Hamilton	9	12	1	3	20	12

== Regular season ==
=== Week 1: vs San Jose SaberCats ===
	1	2	3	4	Total
SJ	21	17	21	7	66
LA	7	24	14	13	58

at Staples Center, Los Angeles

Scoring summary:

1st Quarter:

- SJ- Ben Nelson 6 yard pass from Mark Grieb (A.J. Haglund kick) – 7–0 SJ
- LA- Lenzie Jackson 19 yard pass from Sonny Cumbie (Remy Hamilton kick) – 7–7
- SJ- James Roe 12 yard pass from Mark Grieb (A.J. Haglund kick) – 14–7 SJ
- SJ- Rodney Wright 1 yard run (A.J. Haglund kick) – 21–7 SJ

2nd Quarter:

- LA- Lonnie Ford 6 yard run (Remy Hamilton kick) – 21–14 SJ
- LA- Remy Hamilton 17 yard field goal – 21–17 SJ
- SJ- Matt Kinsinger 1 yard run (A.J. Haglund kick) – 28–17 SJ
- LA- Kevin Ingram 21 yard pass from Sonny Cumbie (Remy Hamilton kick) – 28–24 SJ
- SJ- A.J. Haglund 26 yard field goal – 31–24 SJ
- LA- Rob Turner 9 yard pass from Sonny Cumbie (Remy Hamilton kick) – 31–31
- SJ- Ben Nelson 9 yard pass from Mark Grieb (A.J. Haglund kick) – 38–31 SJ

3rd Quarter:

- LA – Kevin Ingram 14 yd pass from Sonny Cumbie (Remy Hamilton kick) – 38–38
- SJ – Ben Nelson 24 yd pass from Mark Grieb (A.J. Haglund kick) – 45–38 SJ
- LA – Lenzie Jackson 3 yd pass from Sonny Cumbie (Remy Hamilton kick) – 45–45
- SJ – Ben Nelson 12 yd pass from Mark Grieb (A.J. Haglund kick) – 52–45 SJ
- SJ – Rodney Wright 3 yd run (A.J. Haglund kick) – 59–45 SJ

4th Quarter:

- LA – Lenzie Jackson 23 yd pass from Sonny Cumbie (Remy Hamilton kick) – 59–52 SJ
- SJ – Rodney Wright 8 yd pass from Mark Grieb (A.J. Haglund kick) – 66–52 SJ
- LA – Rob Turner 25 yd pass from Sonny Cumbie (Remy Hamilton kick failed) – 66–58 SJ

Attendance: 12,586

=== Week 2: @ Orlando Predators ===
	1	2	3	4	OT	Tot
LA	10	7	5	14	7	44
ORL	3	7	7	20	0	38

at Hummer Field at Amway Arena, Orlando, Florida

Scoring summary:

1st Quarter:

- 10:52 LA – Remy Hamilton 26 yd field goal – 3–0 LA
- 06:11 ORL – Jay Taylor 31 yd field goal – 3–3
- 01:49 LA – Lenzie Jackson 17 yd pass from Sonny Cumbie (Remy Hamilton kick) – 10–3 LA

2nd Quarter:

- 12:03 LA – Lenzie Jackson 1 yd run (Remy Hamilton kick) – 17–3 LA
- 07:59 ORL – Shane Stafford 2 yd run (Jay Taylor kick) – 17–10 LA

3rd Quarter:

- 05:36 LA – Kevin Ingram 22 yd pass from Sonny Cumbie (Remy Hamilton kick failed) – 23–10 LA
- 03:17 ORL – DeAndrew Rubin 32 yd pass from Shane Stafford (Jay Taylor kick) – 23–17 LA

4th Quarter:

- 14:54 LA – Rob Turner 14 yd pass from Sonny Cumbie (Remy Hamilton kick) – 30–17 LA
- 12:07 ORL – DeAndrew Rubin 19 yd pass from Shane Stafford (Jay Taylor kick) – 30–24 LA
- 09:11 LA – Kevin Ingram 27 yd pass from Sonny Cumbie (Remy Hamilton kick) – 37–24 LA
- 06:26 ORL – Kevin Nagle 1 yd run (Jay Taylor kick failed) – 37–30 ORL
- 00:07 ORL – Javarus Dudley 23 yd pass from Shane Stafford (Jay Taylor kick) – 37–37

Overtime:

- 10:05 LA – Rob Turner 9 yd pass from Sonny Cumbie (Remy Hamilton kick) – 44–37 LA

Attendance: 12,787

=== Week 4: @ New Orleans VooDoo ===
at New Orleans Arena, New Orleans, Louisiana

Scoring summary:

1st Quarter:

2nd Quarter:

3rd Quarter:

4th Quarter:

Attendance: 16,668

=== Week 5: @ Chicago Rush ===
at Allstate Arena, Rosemont, Illinois

Scoring summary:

1st Quarter:

2nd Quarter:

3rd Quarter:

4th Quarter:

Attendance: 15,846

=== Week 6: vs Arizona Rattlers ===
	1	2	3	4	Total
ARI	0	17	21	7	45
LA	6	17	14	27	64

at Staples Center, Los Angeles

Scoring summary:

1st Quarter:

- 07:42 LA – Lenzie Jackson 14 yd pass from Sonny Cumbie – 6–0 LA

2nd Quarter:

- 13:16 LA – Kevin Ingram 6 yd pass from Sonny Cumbie (Remy Hamilton kick) – 13–0 LA
- 09:24 ARI – Trandon Harvey 16 yd pass from Sherdrick Bonner (Gary Kral kick) – 13–7 LA
- 03:59 LA – Rob Turner 13 yd pass from Sonny Cumbie (Remy Hamilton kick) – 20–7 LA
- 01:59 ARI – Jeremiah Pope 18 yd pass from Sherdrick Bonner (Gary Kral kick) – 20–14 LA
- 00:39 LA – Remy Hamilton 33 yd field goal – 23–14 LA
- 00:00 ARI – Gary Kral 23 yd field goal – 23–17 LA

3rd Quarter:

- 13:48 ARI – Trandon Harvey 37 yd pass from Sherdrick Bonner (Gary Kral kick) – 24–23 ARI
- 10:45 LA – Lonnie Ford 3 yd run (Remy Hamilton kick) – 30–24 LA
- 05:18 ARI – Trandon Harvey 25 yd pass from Sherdrick Bonner (Gary Kral kick) – 31–30 ARI
- 02:17 LA – Rob Turner 5 yd pass from Sonny Cumbie (Remy Hamilton kick) – 37–31 LA
- 00:32 ARI – Jeremiah Pope 5 yd pass from Sherdrick Bonner (Gary Kral kick) – 38–37 ARI

4th Quarter:

- 10:16 LA – Kevin Ingram 7 yd pass from Sonny Cumbie (Remy Hamilton kick) – 44–38 LA
- 09:04 LA – Lenzie Jackson 0 yd net recovery (Remy Hamilton kick failed) – 50–38 LA
- 05:30 LA – Lonnie Ford 1 yd run (Remy Hamilton kick) – 57–38 LA
- 03:25 ARI – Bo Kelly 3 yd run (Gary Kral kick) – 57–45 LA
- 02:57 LA – Kevin Ingram 12 yd kickoff return (Remy Hamilton kick) – 64–45 LA

Attendance: 12,972

=== Week 7: @ Utah Blaze ===
at EnergySolutions Arena, Salt Lake City, Utah

Scoring summary:

1st Quarter:

2nd Quarter:

3rd Quarter:

4th Quarter:

Attendance: 13,497

=== Week 8: @ San Jose SaberCats ===
at the HP Pavilion at San Jose, San Jose, California

Scoring summary:

1st Quarter:

2nd Quarter:

3rd Quarter:

4th Quarter:

Attendance: 12,984

=== Week 9: vs Grand Rapids Rampage ===
	1	2	3	4	Total
GR	14	28	7	22	71
LA	3	21	27	24	75

at Staples Center, Los Angeles

Scoring summary:

1st Quarter:

2nd Quarter:

3rd Quarter:

4th Quarter:

Attendance: 15,088

=== Week 10: @ Las Vegas Gladiators ===
at Orléans Arena, Las Vegas, Nevada

Scoring summary:

1st Quarter:

2nd Quarter:

3rd Quarter:

4th Quarter:

Attendance: 5,698

=== Week 11: vs Tampa Bay Storm ===
	1	2	3	4	Total
TB	10	7	3	20	40
LA	7	16	7	7	37

at Staples Center, Los Angeles

Scoring summary:

1st Quarter:

2nd Quarter:

3rd Quarter:

4th Quarter:

Attendance: 12,439

=== Week 12: vs Georgia Force ===
	1	2	3	4	Total
GEO	6	17	7	21	51
LA	6	17	13	21	57

at Staples Center, Los Angeles

Scoring summary:

1st Quarter:

- 11:49 GEO – Chris Jackson 8 yd pass from Chris Greisen (Jarrick Hillery rush failed) – 6–0 GEO
- 10:10 LA – LaShaun Ward 43 yd pass from Sonny Cumbie (Remy Hamilton kick failed) – 6–6

2nd Quarter:

- 14:09 LA – LaShaun Ward 13 yd pass from Sonny Cumbie (Remy Hamilton kick) – 13–6 LA
- 12:46 GEO – Troy Bergeron 36 yd pass from Chris Greisen (Carlos Martínez kick) – 13–13
- 07:23 LA – Remy Hamilton 17 yd field goal – 16–13 LA
- 06:52 GEO – Derek Lee 45 yd pass from Chris Greisen (Carlos Martínez kick) – 20–16 GEO
- 00:37 LA – Lonnie Ford 2 yd run (Remy Hamilton kick) – 23–20 LA
- 00:00 GEO – Carlos Martínez 31 yd field goal – 23–23

3rd Quarter:

- 11:55 LA – Robert Quiroga 5 yd pass from Sonny Cumbie (Remy Hamilton kick) – 30–23 LA
- 09:35 GEO – Chris Jackson 1 yd run (Carlos Martínez kick) – 30–30
- 06:11 LA – Rob Turner 18 yd pass from Sonny Cumbie (Remy Hamilton kick failed) – 36–30 LA

4th Quarter:

- 13:58 LA – LaShaun Ward 28 yd pass from Sonny Cumbie (Remy Hamilton kick) – 43–30 LA
- 11:34 LA – Robert Quiroga 12 yd pass from Sonny Cumbie (Remy Hamilton kick) – 50–30 LA
- 08:24 LA – LaShaun Ward 15 yd pass from Sonny Cumbie (Remy Hamilton kick) – 57–30 LA
- 06:21 GEO – Chris Jackson 12 yd pass from Chris Greisen (Carlos Martínez kick) – 57–37 LA
- 02:00 GEO – Derek Lee 11 yd pass from Chris Greisen (Carlos Martínez kick) – 57–44 LA
- 00:46 GEO – Troy Bergeron 9 yd pass from Chris Greisen (Carlos Martínez kick) – 57–51 LA

Attendance: 13,922

=== Week 13: @ Kansas City Brigade ===
at Kemper Arena, Kansas City, Missouri

Scoring summary:

1st Quarter:

2nd Quarter:

3rd Quarter:

4th Quarter:

Attendance: 13,213

=== Week 14: vs Chicago Rush ===
	1	2	3	4	Total
CHI	7	13	7	20	47
LA	9	21	7	13	50

at Staples Center, Los Angeles

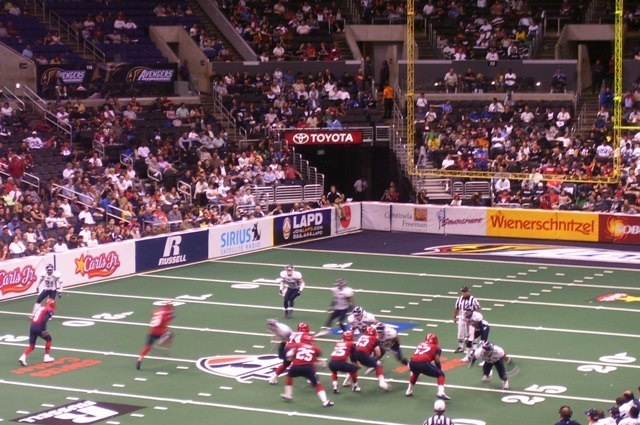
The Avengers line-up prior to a snap against the Chicago Rush.

Scoring summary:

1st Quarter:

- 10:46 LA – Remy Hamilton 26 yd field goal – 3–0 LA
- 06:20 CHI – Rob Mager 19 yd pass from Matt D'Orazio (Dan Frantz kick) – 7–3 CHI
- 01:47 LA – Terrance Stubbs 10 yd pass from Sonny Cumbie (Remy Hamilton kick failed) – 9–7 LA

2nd Quarter:

- 14:18 CHI – Matt D'Orazio 6 yd run (Dan Frantz kick) – 14–9 CHI
- 08:51 LA – Lonnie Ford 1 yd run (Remy Hamilton kick) – 16–14 LA
- 04:49 CHI – DeJuan Alvonzo 10 yd pass from Matt D'Orazio – 20–16 CHI
- 00:33 LA – LaShaun Ward 13 yd pass from Sonny Cumbie (Remy Hamilton kick) – 23–20 LA
- 00:22 LA – Robert Quiroga 0 yd fumble recovery (Remy Hamilton kick) – 30–20 LA

3rd Quarter:

- 06:40 CHI – Joe Peters 1 yd run (Dan Frantz kick) – 30–27 LA
- 02:04 LA – Sonny Cumbie 5 yd run (Remy Hamilton kick) – 37–27 LA

4th Quarter:

- 14:55 CHI – Rob Mager 19 yd pass from Matt D'Orazio (DeJuan Alvonzo pass failed) – 37–33 LA
- 12:31 LA – Rob Turner 21 yd pass from Sonny Cumbie (Remy Hamilton kick) – 44–33 LA
- 09:12 CHI – Bob McMillen 3 yd pass from Matt D'Orazio (Dan Frantz kick failed) – 44–39 LA
- 05:20 LA – Remy Hamilton 33 yd field goal – 47–39 LA
- 04:16 CHI – Rob Mager 20 yd pass from Matt D'Orazio (Matt D'Orazio rush) – 47–47
- 00:00 LA – Remy Hamilton 29 yd field goal – 50–47 LA

Attendance: 13,142

=== Week 15: @ Arizona Rattlers ===
at the US Airways Center, Phoenix, Arizona

Scoring summary:

1st Quarter:

2nd Quarter:

3rd Quarter:

4th Quarter:

Attendance: 11,994

=== Week 16: vs Las Vegas Gladiators ===
	1	2	3	4	Total
LV	14	7	7	14	42
LA	14	23	14	9	60

at Staples Center, Los Angeles

Scoring summary:

1st Quarter:

2nd Quarter:

3rd Quarter:

4th Quarter:

Attendance: 12,482

=== Week 17: vs Utah Blaze ===
	1	2	3	4	Total
UTA	14	16	14	3	47
LA	14	10	0	13	37

at Staples Center, Los Angeles

Scoring summary:

1st Quarter:

2nd Quarter:

3rd Quarter:

4th Quarter:

Attendance: 13,323

== Playoffs ==
=== Week 1: vs (5) Utah Blaze ===
	1	2	3	4	Total
(5) UTA	14	0	7	21	42
(4) LA	14	23	14	13	64

at Staples Center, Los Angeles

Scoring summary:

1st Quarter:

2nd Quarter:

3rd Quarter:

4th Quarter:

Attendance: 13,066

- Offensive player of the game: Sonny Cumbie (LA)
- Defensive player of the game: Silas Demary (LA)
- Ironman of the game: Josh Jeffries (LA)

Team	1st Down.	Rush. Yds	Pass. Yds	Fumbles/lost	Fumble yds	Penal./yds	TOP	3rd Down.	4th Down.
UTA	17	3	323	3/2	15	6/36	28:21	3/7	0/3
LA	20	18	306	3/3	0	5/32	31:39	2/5	1/1

=== Week 2: at (2) Chicago Rush ===
	1	2	3	4	Total
(5) LA	7	13	0	0	20
(2) CHI	10	28	0	14	52

at Allstate Arena, Rosemont, Illinois

Scoring summary:

1st Quarter:

2nd Quarter:

3rd Quarter:

4th Quarter:

Attendance:

- Offensive player of the game:
- Defensive player of the game:
- Ironman of the game:

Team	1st Down.	Rush. Yds	Pass. Yds	Fumbles/lost	Fumble yds	Penal./yds	TOP	3rd Down.	4th Down.
LA	15	1	257	1/0	0	4/17	37:24	3/12	2/7
CHI	20	24	275	1/1	0	6/33	22:36	2/4	1/1
