= Mike Ulufale =

American football player (born 1972)

No. 93, 99, 50
- Position: Defensive tackle

Personal information
- Born: February 1, 1972 (age 54); Honolulu, Hawaii, U.S.
- Listed height: 6 ft 4 in (1.93 m)
- Listed weight: 277 lb (126 kg)

Career information
- High school: James Campbell (Ewa Beach, Hawaii)
- College: BYU
- NFL draft: 1996: 3rd round, 95th overall pick

Career history
- Dallas Cowboys (1996); San Jose SaberCats (2000–2002); Los Angeles Avengers (2003); Philadelphia Soul (2004)*
- * Offseason or practice squad member only

Awards and highlights
- ArenaBowl champion (2002); Second-team All-Arena (2002); AFL All-Rookie Team (2000)

Career NFL statistics
- Tackles: 2
- Stats at Pro Football Reference

Career AFL statistics
- Tackles: 29
- Sacks: 13.5
- Forced fumbles: 4
- Stats at ArenaFan.com

Michael Fuimaono Ulufale (born February 1, 1972) is an American former professional football player who was a defensive tackle in the National Football League (NFL) for the Dallas Cowboys. He played college football at Brigham Young University and was selected in the third round of the 1996 NFL draft.

== Early life ==
Ulufale attended James Campbell High School, where he lettered in football, baseball and basketball. As a senior, he was named a first-team West All-Star as a quarterback and linebacker. In basketball he was named second-team West All-Star.

Because of poor grades, he attended San Bernardino Valley College where he was a two-way player (defensive end and tight end). As a sophomore, he earned first-team All-American honors on defense and second-team on offense. He was also named the Foothill Conference Defensive MVP. He finished his 2 seasons with 131 tackles and 26 sacks.

Ulufale transferred to Brigham Young University but was medical redshirted in 1993, because of a shoulder injury. He became a starter at right defensive tackle as a junior and was third on the team in sacks (6) and tackles for loss (11).

As a senior, he was suspended for 4 games in the middle of the season for breaking the school's honor code. He eventually played in six games, starting three at left defensive end, while registering 24 tackles (3 for loss).

== Professional career ==
=== Dallas Cowboys ===
Ulufale was selected by the Dallas Cowboys in the third round of the 1996 NFL draft. He suffered torn anterior cruciate ligament in his right knee during a practice, that placed him on the injured reserve list on November 21, 1996.

The next year, he suffered from a strained neck injury sustained during mini-camp practices. He was waived before the season started, so he filed a grievance for being released with an existing injury (strained neck).

=== San Jose SaberCats ===
Ulufale signed with the San Jose SaberCats in 2000, and earned AFL All-Rookie honors when he registered four sacks, two interceptions, 11 passes batted down and six tackles in ten games. The next year, he finished with 3 sacks and 11 tackles in eight games, while being named second-team All-AFL. In 2002, he helped the team win the ArenaBowl XVI championship.

=== Los Angeles Avengers ===
On October 30, 2002, he signed as a free agent with the Los Angeles Avengers and finished the season with 15 tackles, 11 passes batted down and tied for the team lead with 3 sacks.

=== Philadelphia Soul ===
On February 24, 2004, the Philadelphia Soul traded Jeriod Johnson to the Los Angeles Avengers in exchange for Ulufale.

== Personal life ==
In January 2004, his brothers Tali and Semeri died in a span of 24 hours of natural causes.

Ulufale is currently the football head coach for Saint Francis School.
