= Arena Football League Defensive Player of the Year =

The Arena Football League Defensive Player of the Year was an award given by the Arena Football League to the league's most outstanding defensive player at the end of every AFL season since 1996. Multiple-award winners include Kenny McEntyre, Clevan Thomas, and Joe Sykes; McEntyre and Thomas have won the award three times each, while Sykes has won it twice. Thomas and Vic Hall are the only players to win the award as a rookie (2002 & 2011 respectively). The award was sponsored by ADT Security Services from 2002 to 2008. Since 2010, the award has been sponsored by Riddell.

== AFL Defensive Players of the Year ==
| Season | Player | AFL team | Position |
|---|---|---|---|
| 1996 | David McLeod | Albany Firebirds | WR/DB |
| 1997 | Tracey Perkins | Tampa Bay Storm | DS |
| 1998 | Johnnie Harris | Tampa Bay Storm | DB |
| 1999 | James Baron | Nashville Kats | DL |
| 2000 | Kenny McEntyre | Orlando Predators | DS |
| 2001 | Kenny McEntyre (2) | Orlando Predators | DS |
| 2002 | Clevan Thomas | San Jose SaberCats | DB |
| 2003 | Clevan Thomas (2) | San Jose SaberCats | DB |
| 2004 | Kenny McEntyre (3) | Orlando Predators | DS |
| 2005 | Silas DeMary | Los Angeles Avengers | DL/OL |
| 2006 | Jerald Brown | Columbus Destroyers | DB |
| 2007 | Greg White | Orlando Predators | DL/OL |
| 2008 | Dennison Robinson | Chicago Rush | DB |
| 2010 | Gabe Nyenhuis | Tulsa Talons | DL |
| 2011 | Vic Hall | Chicago Rush | DB |
| 2012 | Joe Sykes | San Jose SaberCats | DL |
| 2013 | Clevan Thomas (3) | San Jose SaberCats | DB |
| 2014 | Jason Stewart | San Jose SaberCats | DL |
| 2015 | Joe Sykes (2) | Jacksonville Sharks | DL |
| 2016 | Tracy Belton | Philadelphia Soul | DB |
| 2017 | Beau Bell | Philadelphia Soul | LB |
| 2018 | Terence Moore | Albany Empire | LB |
| 2019 | James Romain | Philadelphia Soul | DB |
