= James Williams (linebacker, born 1968) =

American football player (born 1968)

No. 90, 53, 35
- Position: Linebacker

Personal information
- Born: October 10, 1968 (age 58); Natchez, Mississippi, U.S.
- Listed height: 6 ft 0 in (1.83 m)
- Listed weight: 246 lb (112 kg)

Career information
- High school: Natchez
- College: Mississippi State
- NFL draft: 1990: 6th round, 158th overall pick
- Expansion draft: 1995: 25th round, 49 (Note: He was also drafted in the 1999 expansion draft / round: 1 / pick: 28.)th overall pick

Career history
- New Orleans Saints (1990–1994); Jacksonville Jaguars (1995); Atlanta Falcons (1996)*; New England Patriots (1997)*; San Francisco 49ers (1997–1998); Cleveland Browns (1999); San Francisco Demons (2001); San Jose SaberCats (2002–2003); Georgia Force (2004); Arizona Rattlers (2004)
- * Offseason or practice squad member only

Awards and highlights
- ArenaBowl champion (2002); AFL All-Rookie Team (2002); Second-team All-SEC (1989)

Career NFL statistics
- Tackles: 297
- Sacks: 3
- Forced fumbles: 4
- Interceptions: 4
- Stats at Pro Football Reference
- Stats at ArenaFan.com

James Edward Williams (born October 10, 1968) is an American former professional football player who was a linebacker in the National Football League (NFL). He played college football for the Mississippi State Bulldogs.

== Professional career ==
He played for the New Orleans Saints (1990–1994), the Jacksonville Jaguars (1995–1996), the San Francisco 49ers (1997–1998), and the Cleveland Browns (1999). He played college football at Mississippi State University and was a sixth round draft choice in the 1990 NFL draft. He was selected by the Jaguars in the 1995 NFL expansion draft.

Pre-draft measurables
Height	Weight	Arm length	Hand span	40-yard dash	10-yard split	20-yard split	20-yard shuttle	Vertical jump	Broad jump	Bench press
6 ft 0 1/8 in (1.83 m)	223 lb (101 kg)	31 in (0.79 m)	9 5/8 in (0.24 m)	4.74 s	1.69 s	2.71 s	4.44 s	32.0 in (0.81 m)	9 ft 6 in (2.90 m)	19 reps
