= Greg Krause =

American football player (born 1976)

Greg Krause (born April 4, 1976, in Boston, Massachusetts) was an Arena Football League offensive lineman for the Los Angeles Avengers.
