= Robert Quiroga (gridiron football) =

American football player (born 1982)

No. 84, 7
- Position: Wide receiver / Linebacker

Personal information
- Born: February 7, 1982 (age 44); San Antonio, Texas, U.S.
- Listed height: 6 ft 2 in (1.88 m)
- Listed weight: 210 lb (95 kg)

Career information
- High school: Holmes (San Antonio)
- College: Baylor (2000–2003)
- NFL draft: 2004: undrafted

Career history
- Baltimore Ravens (2004)*; Ottawa Renegades (2005); Los Angeles Avengers (2007); Chicago Rush (2008)*; Los Angeles Avengers (2008); Austin Turfcats (2009); Orlando Predators (2010); Chicago Rush (2011)*; Orlando Predators (2011); San Antonio Talons (2012–2014)
- * Offseason or practice squad member only
- Stats at ArenaFan.com

Robert Anthony Quiroga (born February 7, 1982) is an American former professional football wide receiver who played eight seasons in the Arena Football League (AFL) with the Los Angeles Avengers, Orlando Predators and San Antonio Talons. He played college football at Baylor University. He was also a member of the Baltimore Ravens, Ottawa Renegades, Chicago Rush and Austin Turfcats.

== Early life ==
Quiroga played high school football at Oliver Wendell Holmes High School in San Antonio. He earned first-team All-Greater San Antonio honors as both a receiver and punter. He also garnered Honorable mention all-state recognition. Quiroga recorded career totals of 2,086 yards and 33 touchdowns on 103 receptions. He also participated in track and field for the Huskies, having run the anchor leg on the Huskies' 4 × 400 metres relay team that captured the Class 5A state championship in 1999.

== College career ==
Quiroga played for the Baylor Bears from 2000 to 2003, recording career totals of 1,478 yards and nine touchdowns on 131 receptions. He garnered First-team All-Big 12 Conference recognition as a kick returner from the Waco Tribune-Herald in 2003. He also participated in track for the Bears, earning All-American honors as a member of Baylor's 4 × 400 relay team that finished second at the NCAA Outdoor Championships.

== Professional career ==
Quiroga signed with the Baltimore Ravens on April 30, 2004 after going undrafted in the 2004 NFL draft. He was released by the Ravens on May 20, 2004.

He played in four games for the Ottawa Renegades during the 2005 season, recording 134 yards on nine receptions.

Quiroga was signed to the Los Angeles Avengers' practice squad on April 20, 2006. He was promoted to the active roster on May 12, 2006, recording one tackle and one forced fumble during the 2006 season. He totaled 52.5 tackles on defense as well as 235 yards and 11 touchdowns on 21 receptions in ten games in 2007.

Quiroga signed with the Chicago Rush on February 4, 2008. He was released by the Rush on February 22, 2008.

He was signed by the Los Angeles Avengers on February 26, 2008. He collected eleven tackles during the 2008 season. Quiroga was released by the Avengers on March 25, 2008. The Arena Football League suspended operations in 2009.

He played for the Austin Turfcats of the Southern Indoor Football League in 2009.

Quiroga signed with the Orlando Predators on January 13, 2010. He recorded 635 yards and 13 touchdowns on 59 receptions along with 16 tackles and a fumble recovery in 2010.

He was signed by the Chicago Rush on October 11, 2010.

Quiroga was traded to the Orlando Predators on March 4, 2011 for a claim order position. He accumulated for 1,553 yards and 26 touchdowns on 126 receptions in 18 games in 2011.

Quiroga signed with the San Antonio Talons on September 29, 2011. He caught 32 passes for 457 yards and 11 touchdowns in six games during the 2012 season. He made one start for the Talons in 2013, recording 74 yards and two touchdowns on seven receptions as well as one tackle. Quiroga totaled 494 yards and six touchdowns on 54 receptions in 13 games during the 2014 season. The Talons folded after the 2014 season.
