= James Hundon =

American football player (born 1971)

No. 85, 80, 6, 82, 89
- Position: Wide receiver

Personal information
- Born: April 9, 1971 (age 55); San Francisco, California, U.S.
- Listed height: 6 ft 1 in (1.85 m)
- Listed weight: 180 lb (82 kg)

Career information
- High school: Jefferson (Daly City, California)
- College: San Francisco CC (1992); Portland State (1993–1995)
- NFL draft: 1996: undrafted

Career history
- Cincinnati Bengals (1996–1999); San Francisco Demons (2001); San Jose SaberCats (2001–2003); Toronto Argonauts (2003); Calgary Stampeders (2003); San Jose SaberCats (2004–2005)

Awards and highlights
- 2× ArenaBowl champion (2002, 2004); Second-team All-Arena (2002)

Career NFL statistics
- Receptions: 28
- Receiving yards: 416
- Receiving touchdowns: 4
- Stats at Pro Football Reference

Career AFL statistics
- Receptions: 307
- Receiving yards: 4,662
- Touchdowns: 99
- Stats at ArenaFan.com

James Henry Hundon (born April 9, 1971) is an American former professional football player who was a wide receiver for four seasons with the Cincinnati Bengals of the National Football League (NFL). He played college football at City College of San Francisco and Portland State University. Hundon was also a member of the San Francisco Demons of the XFL, the San Jose SaberCats of the Arena Football League (AFL), and the Toronto Argonauts and Calgary Stampeders of the Canadian Football League (CFL).

== Early life ==
James Henry Hundon was born on April 9, 1971, in San Francisco, California. He attended Jefferson High School in Daly City, California.

== College career ==
Hundon first played college football at City College of San Francisco in 1992 and was named the team MVP during his only season there. He was inducted into the City College of San Francisco's athletics hall of fame in November 2000.

Hundon was a member of the Vikings of Portland State University from 1993 to 1995 and a two-year letterman from 1994 to 1995. During his time at Portland State, he caught 83 passes for 1,406 yards and averaged 25.3 yards per kickoff return.

== Professional career ==
Hundon signed with the Cincinnati Bengals on April 23, 1996, after going undrafted in the 1996 NFL draft. He was released on August 27 and signed to the practice squad the next day. He was promoted to the active roster on November 22 and played in five games for the Bengals during the 1996 season, catching one pass for 14 yards and a touchdown while also returning ten kicks for 237 yards. Hundon appeared in all 16 games for the Bengals during his second season in 1997, recording 16 receptions for 285 yards and two touchdowns and ten kick returns for 169 yards. He played in nine games, starting three, in 1998, catching ten passes for 112 yards and one touchdown. He appeared in six games in 1999 and caught one pass for five yards. Hundon became a free agent after the season and re-signed with the team on April 3, 2000. He was released by the Bengals on August 28, 2000.

Hundon played in all ten games, starting five, for the San Francisco Demons of the XFL in 2001, totaling 28 catches for 357 yards, 12 punt returns for 116 yards, and four kick returns for 56 yards. He was featured on the cover of Sports Illustrated following week one of the XFL season. The Demons went 5–5 and advanced to the league title game, where they lost to the Los Angeles Xtreme 38–6.

Hundon was signed by the San Jose SaberCats of the Arena Football League on May 3, 2001. He played in seven games for the SaberCats during the 2001 season, catching 44 passes for 717 yards and 14 touchdowns. He re-signed with the team on March 23, 2002. Hundon started all 14 games in 2002, recording 98 receptions for 1,464 yards and 35 touchdowns. The SaberCats finished the season with a 13–1 record and eventually advanced to ArenaBowl XVI, where they beat the Arizona Rattlers by a score of 52–14. Hundon was named second-team All-Arena as an offensive specialist for his performance during the 2002 season. He re-signed with the SaberCats again on December 31, 2002. He was placed on injured reserve on March 8, 2003, and was activated on April 4, 2003. Overall, Hundon appeared in 11 games, starting ten, in 2003, catching 78 passes for 1,228 yards and 29 touchdowns.

On June 26, 2003, it was reported that Hundon had signed with the Toronto Argonauts of the Canadian Football League (CFL). He dressed in four games for the Argonauts during the 2003 CFL season, recording eight receptions for 124 yards and one touchdown. He was moved to the practice roster in August 2003 and was cut later that month.

Hundon was signed by the CFL's Calgary Stampeders on August 18, 2003. He was named the CFL special teams player of the week after returning a kickoff 103 yards for a touchdown in a 28–22 victory over the Edmonton Eskimos on September 1. He had 149 kickoff return yards total in the game. Overall, Hundon dressed in nine games for the Stampeders in 2003, totaling 17 catches for 271 yards, 19 kick returns for 411 yards and one touchdown, and 22 punt returns for 136 yards.

On December 1, 2003, Hundon was activated from the SaberCats exempt list. He was placed on injured reserve on May 15, 2004. He re-signed with the Sabercats on May 28. Hundon was activated from injured reserve on May 29. He played in all 14 games during the 2004 season, catching 87 passes for 1,253 yards and 21 touchdowns. The SaberCats finished the year with an 11–5 record and eventually advanced to ArenaBowl XVIII, where they defeated the Rattlers by a score of 69–62. Hundon was placed on injured reserve the next year on January 28, 2005, and did not play in any games that season. He retired on November 29, 2005.
