= Sam Hernandez =

American football player (born 1968)

No. 55
- Positions: Offensive lineman, defensive lineman

Personal information
- Born: November 18, 1969 (age 56); San Jose, California, U.S.
- Listed height: 6 ft 3 in (1.91 m)
- Listed weight: 255 lb (116 kg)

Career information
- College: Sonoma State
- NFL draft: 1992: undrafted

Career history
- Charlotte Rage (1992); Las Vegas Sting (1994–1995); Anaheim Piranhas (1996–1997); San Jose SaberCats (1998–2005)

Awards and highlights
- 2× ArenaBowl champion (2002, 2004); 3× First-team All-Arena (1995, 1996, 2000); 2× Second-team All-Arena (1998, 2003); Lineman of the Year (2000); First-team AFL 15th Anniversary Team (2001); AFL 20 Greatest Players - #13 (2006); AFL 25 Greatest Players - #9 (2012); AFL all-time sack leader; Arena Football Hall of Fame (2011); 2× NCAC Defensive Player of the Year (1990, 1991); 2× SSU Defensive Player of the Year (1990, 1991); 2× First-team All-NCAC (1990, 1991); NCAC champion (1991)

Career AFL statistics
- Tackles: 154
- Sacks: 57.5
- Interceptions: 4
- Receptions-Yards: 22-299
- Touchdowns: 9
- Stats at ArenaFan.com

Sam Hernandez (born November 18, 1969) is an American former professional football defensive lineman in the Arena Football League (AFL). He is from San Jose, California, and played college football at Sonoma State University.

Hernandez played for the Charlotte Rage, Las Vegas Sting, Anaheim Piranhas, and San Jose SaberCats. In 2011, Hernandez was elected into the Arena Football Hall of Fame.

== College career ==
Hernandez attended Sonoma State University in Rohnert Park, California, where he was a member of the football team. From 1990 to 1991, he was the most dominant defensive player in the Northern California Athletic Conference, twice winning Defensive Player of the Year and two first team All-Northern California Athletic Conference selections.
