= Trumaine Sykes =

American football player (born 1982)

No. 78, 98, 48, 57, 19, 13, 1, 96
- Position: Defensive end

Personal information
- Born: November 22, 1982 (age 43); Grenada, Mississippi, U.S.
- Listed height: 6 ft 4 in (1.93 m)
- Listed weight: 275 lb (125 kg)

Career information
- High school: Grenada
- College: Southern
- NFL draft: 2006: undrafted

Career history
- Washington Redskins (2006); Green Bay Blizzard (2008); Saskatchewan Roughriders (2009); Milwaukee Iron (2010); Edmonton Eskimos (2010–2011); San Jose SaberCats (2012); Sacramento Mountain Lions (2012); San Antonio Talons (2013); San Jose SaberCats (2014); Calgary Stampeders (2014)*; Pittsburgh Power (2014)*; Jacksonville Sharks (2015); Monterrey Steel (2017); Albany Empire (2018–2019)
- * Offseason or practice squad member only

Awards and highlights
- ArenaBowl champion (2019); 4× First-team All-Arena (2012, 2013, 2015, 2018); 2× AFL Defensive Player of the Year (2012, 2015); 4× AFL Defensive Lineman of the Year (2012, 2013, 2015, 2018); First-team All-NAL (2017)

Career NFL statistics
- Total tackles: 1

Career CFL statistics
- Total tackles: 1
- Fumble recoveries: 1

Career AFL statistics
- Total tackles: 118.5
- Sacks: 53.5
- Forced fumbles: 17
- Fumble recoveries: 4
- Interceptions: 3
- Stats at ArenaFan.com

Trumaine "Joe" Sykes (born November 22, 1982) is an American former professional football player who was a defensive end in the National Football League (NFL), Arena Football League (AFL), and Canadian Football League (CFL). He was originally signed by the Washington Redskins as an undrafted free agent in 2006. He played college football for the Southern Jaguars.

== Early life ==
Sykes attended Grenada High School in Grenada, Mississippi. Sykes was a member of the basketball and football teams while at Grenada.

== College career ==
=== Holmes C.C. ===
Sykes began his college career at Holmes Community College in Mississippi. Sykes played two years at Holmes, becoming an NJCAA All-American.

College recruiting
Name	Hometown	School	Height	Weight	40^{‡}	Commit date
Joe Sykes; DE	Grenada, Mississippi	Holmes C. C.	6 ft 4 in (1.93 m)	235 lb (107 kg)	4.6	Jul 8, 2003
Joe Sykes; DE	Recruit ratings: Scout: Rivals:					
Overall recruit ranking: Scout: JC Rivals: NR
Note: In many cases, Scout, Rivals, 247Sports, On3, and ESPN may conflict in their listings of height and weight.; In these cases, the average was taken. ESPN grades are on a 100-point scale.; Sources: "West Virginia Football Commitments". Rivals.; "2003 West Virginia Football Commits". Scout.; "Scout.com Team Recruiting Rankings". Scout.; "2003 Team Ranking". Rivals.com.

Sykes committed to West Virginia University on July 8, 2003. Sykes chose West Virginia over football scholarship offers from Auburn, Louisiana Tech, Memphis, Ole Miss, Mississippi State, Southern Miss & Temple.

=== West Virginia ===
Sykes enrolled at West Virginia in January so he could familiarize himself with the playbook. Sykes appeared in 9 games in 2004, recording 4 tackles with 1.0 sack.

=== Southern ===
His senior year of college, Sykes transferred to Southern University. In his one year with the Jaguars, Sykes was named first team All-SWAC, after leading the conference in sacks with 9.

== Professional career ==
=== Return to San Jose ===
On January 27, 2014, Sykes was traded back to the SaberCats in exchange for Mitch Mustain and Jabari Fletcher.

=== Pittsburgh Power ===
On September 25, 2014, Sykes was assigned to the Pittsburgh Power. The Power folded in November 2014.

=== Jacksonville Sharks ===
On January 12, 2015, Sykes was assigned to the Jacksonville Sharks. Following the seasons end, Sykes was named the Defensive Lineman of the Year for the third time in his career. Sykes was also named the Defensive Player of the Year for the second time in his career.

=== Monterrey Steel ===
On March 24, 2017, Sykes signed with the Monterrey Steel of the National Arena League.

=== Albany Empire ===
On March 19, 2018, Sykes was assigned to the Albany Empire. On July 18, 2018, Sykes was named the AFL's Defensive Lineman of the Year for the 4th time.
