= Steve Watson (linebacker) =

American football player (born 1982)

No. 34
- Position: Linebacker

Personal information
- Born: April 9, 1982 (age 44); St. Charles, Missouri, U.S.
- Listed height: 6 ft 3 in (1.91 m)
- Listed weight: 250 lb (113 kg)

Career information
- College: Missouri State
- NFL draft: 2005: undrafted

Career history
- San Jose SaberCats (2007–2008); Tulsa Talons (2010); Dallas Vigilantes (2011)

Awards and highlights
- ArenaBowl champion (2007); 2× First-team All-Arena (2008, 2010)

Career AFL statistics
- Tackles: 201
- Sacks: 18
- Forced Fumbles: 7
- Fumble Recoveries: 7
- Interceptions: 1
- Stats at ArenaFan.com

Steve Watson (born April 9, 1982) is an American former professional football linebacker who played in the Arena Football League (AFL) with the San Jose SaberCats, Tulsa Talons, and Dallas Vigilantes. He won an ArenaBowl with the SaberCats in 2007.

Watson played football at Missouri State University (then Southwest Missouri State University) from 2001 to 2004. He was a starter during his final two years at the school; at the end of his collegiate career, he had tallied some 238 tackles and 11 sacks. Following the NFL draft, where he was not selected, Watson opted to join the San Jose SaberCats of the Arena Football League. Waston proved an instant success with the SaberCats; as a rookie, he tallied 64 tackles (46 solo) as the SaberCats cruised to ArenaBowl XXI (where they defeated the Columbus Destroyers for their third AFL championship). Watson emerged as one of the league's best linebackers in his second season; he was a First Team All-Arena selection at the end of the season.

Watson's career was interrupted by the league's 2009 suspension of operations. When the AFL resumed play one season later, Watson signed with the Tulsa Talons. Watson equaled his fantastic play from 2008; at the end of the 2010 season, he was again a first-team All-Arena selection. Watson signed with the Dallas Vigilantes in early 2011; he played in Dallas for one year.
