= James Campbell High School =

Location
- 91-980 North Road; Ewa Beach, Hawaii 96706; United States

Information
- Type: Public, co-educational
- Motto: "Integrity & Scholarship...The Way to Wisdom..."
- Established: 1962
- School district: Leeward District
- Principal: Jon Henry Lee
- Faculty: 184.00 (FTE)
- Grades: 9–12
- Enrollment: 3,039 (2022–23)
- Student to teacher ratio: 16.52
- Campus type: Suburban
- Colors: Black and orange
- Athletics: Oahu Interscholastic Association
- Mascot: Sabers
- Rival: Waipahu High School; Kapolei High School
- Accreditation: Western Association of Schools and Colleges
- Newspaper: Ewa Naupaka
- Yearbook: Pohaku Makamae
- Military: United States Navy JROTC
- Distinctions: AVID Demonstration School
- Communities served: Ewa Villages, Ewa Gentry, Ocean Pointe, Ewa Beach, Iroquois Point
- Website: The Academies of James Campbell High School

James Campbell High School (JCHS) is a public high school located at 91-980 North Road in the ʻEwa Beach neighborhood of Honolulu, Hawaiʻi, United States. It is 15 miles (24 km) away from downtown Honolulu. The school serves grades nine through twelve, has an enrollment just over 3000 students, and is part of the Leeward Subdistrict of the Hawaii State Department of Education. It also serves children of Department of Defense employees who live in military housing in ʻEwa Beach, ʻEwa and Iroquois Point. Over half of the students are of Philippine descent.

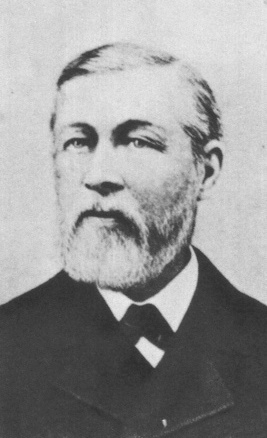
James Campbell

The school's educational program, Smaller Learning Communities, aims to help students in a chosen career pathway, thus benefiting them in precise occupational skills for the future. As of December 2007, James Campbell High School became the second Hawaii high school (along with the private Mid-Pacific Institute) to gain the status of International Baccalaureate World School, expecting to award prospective JCHS graduates beginning at Commencement 2010. The school has a variety of programs such as agriculture, marine science, newspaper, yearbook, and television production media.

James Campbell High School serves seven rural and two military communities in that area. The school includes 15 major buildings and an athletic complex on 38 acres. There is also a library that doubles as the community’s library as well. It offers comprehensive programs in vocational, technical, academic, and special education. James Campbell High School was accredited in 2011 by the Western Association of Schools & Colleges for a period of six years with a mid-term review.

== Notable alumni ==
Listed alphabetically by last name (year of graduation):

- David Alcos (1987), Hawaii state representative
- Jocelyn Alo (2017), softball player
- Kailin Curran, mixed martial artist
- Dawn Ige, former first lady of Hawaii
- Peter Manuma (2022), professional football safety
- Matthew Masifilo, former NFL center
- Bretman Rock (2017), social media influencer
- Cliff Russell, former NFL wide receiver
- Jaron-Keawe Sagapolutele, Quarterback
- Mike Ulufale, former NFL defensive tackle
- David Veikune, former NFL defensive end
