= Vic Hall =

American football player (born 1986)

Virginia Tech Hokies
- Title: Secondary Coach (Nickelbacks)

Personal information
- Born: September 24, 1986 (age 40); Gretna, Virginia, U.S.
- Listed height: 5 ft 9 in (1.75 m)
- Listed weight: 185 lb (84 kg)

Career information
- High school: Gretna (VA)
- College: Virginia
- NFL draft: 2010: undrafted

Career history

Playing
- Chicago Bears (2010)*; New York Jets (2010)*; Chicago Rush (2011–2013); Arizona Rattlers (2014); Jacksonville Sharks (2014)*; Arizona Rattlers (2015)*
- * Offseason or practice squad member only

Coaching
- National Collegiate Prep (2014–2018) Assistant coach; Western Illinois (2018) Graduate assistant & cornerbacks coach; Howard (2019) Cornerbacks coach; Hampton (2020) Safeties coach; Ball State (2021–2022) Cornerbacks coach & co-recruiting coordinator; Ball State (2023) Passing game coordinator & defensive backs coach; Penn State (2024) Defensive analyst; Rutgers (2025) Safeties coach; Virginia Tech (2026–present) Secondary Coach (Nickels)

Awards and highlights
- 2007 ACC Specialist of the Week (Oct 1); 2011 AFL Defensive Player of the Year; First Team All-Arena (2011); AFL Single Season Interception Record: 14 (2011); AFL Single Season Rookie Interception Record: 14 (2011)

Career AFL statistics
- Total tackles: 256
- Forced fumbles: 4
- Fumble recoveries: 4
- Pass deflections: 52
- Interceptions: 25
- Stats at ArenaFan.com

Vicqual Renee "Vic" Hall (born September 24, 1986) is an American former football defensive back and current Secondary Coach (Nickelbacks) for the Virginia Tech Hokies. He was signed by the Chicago Bears as an undrafted free agent in 2010. He played college football at Virginia, where he played multiple positions for the Cavaliers. He was the starting quarterback and also served as a kick returner and holder. In 2007 and 2008, he played as a cornerback.

== Early life ==
Hall was born on September 24, 1986, in Gretna, Virginia, US to parents Rochelle Hall and Victor Calloway. Vic Hall attended Gretna High School where he played football, baseball and basketball. He started for his team as a freshman in 2001 and recorded 14 touchdown passes and a combined 1,546 rushing and passing yards. As a sophomore, he recorded 2,184 passing yards, 20 passing touchdowns, 1,045 rushing yards, and 12 rushing touchdowns.

During his junior year, he set a Virginia state record by recording 4,434 total offensive yards, which included 2,769 passing and 1,665 rushing yards. He led his team, Gretna, which set a Virginia High School League (VHSL) record in the 1990s for 43 straight losses, to a 14–0 record and the Group A state championship. Hall also had 31 passing touchdowns and 25 rushing touchdowns for a total of 56 touchdowns, the second-highest in state history at that time. As a senior, he broke the state record he set when he recorded 4,852 offensive yards. That season, Hall recorded 165 completions on 259 attempts, 2,851 passing yards, 38 passing touchdowns, 174 carries, 1,982 rushing yards, and 26 rushing touchdowns. He again led his team to the state championship and a 14–0 record in his senior year. Hall was named a first-team all-state quarterback three times and a SuperPrep All-American.

== College career ==
Hall chose to attend the University of Virginia. He graduated with a bachelor's degree in anthropology, and continued to pursue graduate studies while exhausting his college eligibility. He sat out the 2005 season as a redshirt. In 2006, head coach Al Groh moved Hall to cornerback, a position that lacked depth and for which Hall was suited with his athleticism and size. Nevertheless, it was an unusual decision considering Hall's record-setting interscholastic career as a quarterback. That year, Hall saw action in all 12 games as a reserve cornerback and on special teams as an outside gunner on punts. He recorded 13 tackles, including seven in punt coverage.

In 2007, Hall started in all 13 games as a cornerback and again played on special teams, including as a holder and return specialist. He led the team's cornerbacks in tackles. Hall recorded 58 tackles, three broken-up passes, and one interception. He compiled 230 yards on punt returns and 33 yards on kickoff returns. Against Pittsburgh, he returned punts for 22 and 45 yards, each of which set up Virginia touchdowns on the subsequent possession. He also scored a touchdown on a fake field goal attempt. For his performance in that game, Hall was named the Atlantic Coast Conference (ACC) Specialist of the Week.

Hall was named the team captain for the 2008 season and started in 11 games as a cornerback and one as a quarterback, and also handled punt and kick return and holding duties. Hall was the starting quarterback for the season's final game against Virginia Tech. He recorded 59 tackles and two interceptions on defense. As a quarterback, he accumulated one pass attempt, 109 rushing yards, and two rushing touchdowns. In 2009, head coach Al Groh hired Gregg Brandon as the offensive coordinator for the new spread offensive, which made Vic Hall the starting quarterback for the season. In the first game vs. William and Mary, Vic Hall was benched for Jameel Sewell who was the starting quarterback in 2007. After that, Al Groh moved Vic Hall back to cornerback, and then wide receiver where he was very successful. He was also the starting punt returner but was benched vs. William and Mary also. He recovered his starting return job vs. Boston College when he returned a 58-yard punt back for a touchdown, but it was called back for a penalty, and he kept the job for the rest of the season.

== Professional career ==
=== Chicago Bears ===
Hall was signed by the Chicago Bears as an undrafted free agent on April 26, 2010, with the intent to convert him to slot receiver. He was waived on July 21, 2010.

=== New York Jets ===
Hall would be signed by the New York Jets on August 2, 2010. On August 24, 2010, the Jets would waive Hall.

=== Chicago Rush ===
Hall signed with the Chicago Rush of the Arena Football League for the 2011 season. He was named the AFL's Defensive Player of the Week in Week 4 and the Co-Defensive Player of the Week again in Week 12. On June 4, 2011, Hall had three interceptions against the Kansas City Command, returning one for a touchdown. With it, he tied and broke the Arena Football League record for interceptions in a single season. Hall ended the year with 15 interceptions and two touchdowns despite missing the Rush's final four games of the year with an injury. It was the most interceptions in AFL history before Orlando Predators DB Rayshaun Kizer broke the mark in the final game of the 2011 season and finished the year with 16 picks. Hall was named the 2011 AFL Defensive Player of the Year and earned a spot on the First Team All-Arena Team.

=== Arizona Rattlers ===
On October 8, 2013, Hall was assigned to the Arizona Rattlers.

=== Jacksonville Sharks ===
On May 23, 2014, Hall was traded to the Jacksonville Sharks for future considerations. Hall never played for the Sharks, refusing to report.

=== Return to the Rattlers ===
On December 1, 2014, Hall was traded to the Rattlers for future considerations.
