= Jason Stewart (American football) =

American football player (born 1980)

No. 99
- Position: Defensive tackle

Personal information
- Born: November 14, 1980 (age 45); Bakersfield, California, U.S.
- Listed height: 6 ft 1 in (1.85 m)
- Listed weight: 320 lb (145 kg)

Career information
- High school: Bakersfield (CA)
- College: Fresno State
- NFL draft: 2003: undrafted

Career history
- Indianapolis Colts (2003–2005); Los Angeles Avengers (2005–2008); California Redwoods / Sacramento Mountain Lions (2009–2011); San Jose SaberCats (2012–2015)

Awards and highlights
- ArenaBowl champion (2015); First-team All-WAC (2002); Second-team All-Arena (2013); 2× First-team All-Arena (2014, 2015); AFL Defensive Player of the Year (2014)

Career AFL statistics
- Total tackles: 120.5
- Sacks: 42
- Forced fumbles: 9
- Fumble recoveries: 13
- Interceptions: 2
- Stats at ArenaFan.com
- Stats at Pro Football Reference

Jason Stewart (born November 14, 1980) is an American former professional football defensive tackle. He was signed by the Indianapolis Colts as an undrafted free agent in 2003. He played college football at Fresno State.
