= Terrence Stubbs =

American football player (born 1980)

No. 81
- Position: Wide receiver

Personal information
- Born: March 25, 1980 (age 46); Manassas, Virginia, U.S.
- Listed height: 5 ft 11 in (1.80 m)
- Listed weight: 195 lb (88 kg)

Career information
- High school: Oscar F. Smith (Chesapeake, Virginia)
- College: Temple (1999–2003)
- NFL draft: 2004: undrafted

Career history
- New York Jets (2004)*; → Berlin Thunder (2005); Tampa Bay Buccaneers (2006)*; Los Angeles Avengers (2007–2008)
- * Offseason or practice squad member only
- Stats at ArenaFan.com

Terrence Stubbs (born March 25, 1980) is an American former football wide receiver. He played college football at Temple, and signed with the New York Jets as an undrafted free agent in 2004. He later played in the Arena Football League for the Los Angeles Avengers.

== Early life ==
Stubbs attended Oscar F. Smith High School in Chesapeake, Virginia, and was a student and a letterman in football. In football, he won All-City and an All-District honors as a wide receiver.

== College career ==
Stubbs attended Temple University, and was a good student and a letterman in football. In football, he finished his career with 65 receptions for 893 yards (13.74 yards per rec. avg.) and two touchdowns.
