= LaShaun Ward =

American football player (born 1980)

No. 84
- Position: Wide receiver

Personal information
- Born: September 22, 1980 (age 46); Pasadena, California, U.S.
- Listed height: 5 ft 11 in (1.80 m)
- Listed weight: 198 lb (90 kg)

Career information
- High school: John Muir (Pasadena, California)
- College: California
- NFL draft: 2003: undrafted

Career history
- Kansas City Chiefs (2003); → Berlin Thunder (2004); Oakland Raiders (2004-2005)*; Washington Redskins (2006)*; Buffalo Bills (2006)*; Dallas Cowboys (2006)*; Los Angeles Avengers (2007–2008); Hamilton Tiger-Cats (2009)*
- * Offseason or practice squad member only

Awards and highlights
- First-team All-Pac-10 (2002)
- Stats at Pro Football Reference
- Stats at ArenaFan.com

LaShaun Brandon Ward (born September 22, 1980) is a former professional gridiron football wide receiver. He was signed by the Kansas City Chiefs as an undrafted free agent in 2003. He played college football for the California Golden Bears.

Ward was alsop a member of the Berlin Thunder, Oakland Raiders, Washington Redskins, Buffalo Bills, Dallas Cowboys, Los Angeles Avengers and Hamilton Tiger-Cats.

== Early life ==
Ward was born on September 22, 1980, in Pasadena, California, to Jayce and Esmeralda Ward. He attended John Muir High School where he played quarterback. At Muir he was credited with 5,000 total yards as a Junior and Senior. As a senior, he threw for 1,675 yards and ran for 400 more and scored 24 touchdowns. He was a PrepStar Western Region team member, was the third ranked "athlete" (able to play multiple positions) in the country. Ward was an All-Pacific League and West San Gabriel Valley as a junior and senior.

== College career ==
=== 1998 ===
As a true freshman Ward was redshirted.

=== 1999 ===
During his freshman year Ward played mainly at cornerback and wide receiver. On defence he mainly played during nickel and dime packages and lined up with Deltha O'Neal to field kickoffs. He recorded six kickoff returns for 78 yards which included a career-long 32-yard return against Nebraska. Ward made a key block on an O'Neal interception return for a touchdown against Rutgers. His first collegiate interception came against Oregon with less than four minutes left in the game. As a wide receiver he caught a 43-yarder against Washington State and a 55-yarder against Brigham Young.

=== 2000 ===
He mainly played on defence for the Golden Bears playing mostly in passing situations. Against UCLA it was discovered that he had internal bleeding which caused him to miss the rest of the season. However, he still had 17 tackles, four pass deflections and one interception. His best game of the year came against UCLA when he had three unassisted tackles and a couple of pass deflections.

=== 2001 ===
In 2001, he mostly played at wide receiver after starting at defensive back. In the Arizona game he got 135 yards on four catches and two touchdowns. He got five catches for 86 yards against Stanford and three catches for 78 against Rutgers. He got 69 yards on four rushes which ranked him third in rushing for Cal that season behind Terrell Williams and Joe Igber.

== Professional career ==
=== Kansas City Chiefs ===
Ward was signed as an undrafted free agent by the Kansas City Chiefs after going undrafted in the 2003 NFL draft.

After appearing in one game for the Chiefs in 2003 and spending most of the season on the practice squad he was allocated to the Berlin Thunder on February 10, 2004.

=== Oakland Raiders ===
He attended the Oakland Raiders training camp in 2005 but was released on August 22.

=== Washington Redskins ===
Ward signed with the Washington Redskins on January 11, 2006. He was released on May 9, 2006.

=== Buffalo Bills ===
On June 1, 2006, Ward signed with the Buffalo Bills and was released on June 28.

=== Dallas Cowboys ===
He was signed by the Dallas Cowboys and attended training camp but was released on August 28, 2006.

=== Los Angeles Avengers ===
==== 2007 ====
Ward signed with the Los Angeles Avengers shortly after being released by the Cowboys. In his first season with the Avengers in 2007 he got 41 receptions for 561 yards, along with nine touchdowns on offence. He got 31 tackles and one interception on defence.

==== 2008 ====
In 2008, Ward once again played on offence and defence for the Avengers. On offence he recorded 73 receptions for 1,214 receiving yards along with 26 touchdowns. While on defence he got 12 tackles and one fumble recovery.

=== Hamilton Tiger-Cats ===
Ward was signed by the Hamilton Tiger-Cats on April 9, 2009. He was released on June 19, 2009.
