= Peter Manuma =

American football player (born 2003)

Profile
- Position: Safety

Personal information
- Born: July 7, 2003 (age 23)
- Listed height: 6 ft 0 in (1.83 m)
- Listed weight: 205 lb (93 kg)

Career information
- High school: James Campbell
- College: Hawaii (2022–2025)
- NFL draft: 2026: undrafted

Career history
- New England Patriots (2026)*
- * Offseason or practice squad member only

Peter Manuma (born July 7, 2003) is an American football safety. He played college football for the Hawaii Rainbow Warriors.

== Early life ==
Manuma attended James Campbell High School in ʻEwa Beach, Hawaii. He committed to play college football for the Hawaii Rainbow Warriors.

== College career ==
As a freshman in 2022, Manuma notched 70 tackles with three being for a loss, a sack, four pass deflections, two interceptions, and two forced fumbles. In 2023, he started in all 13 games, recording 87 tackles with five and a half being for a loss, and three interceptions. In 2024, Manuma totaled 43 tackles and three pass deflections. After the season, he announced that he would return to the Rainbow Warriors for his senior season. During the 2025 season, Manuma notched 80 tackles and seven pass deflections.

== Professional career ==
After going unselected in the 2026 NFL draft, Manuma signed with the New England Patriots as an undrafted free agent. He was waived by the Patriots as a part of final roster cuts on August 30, 2026.
