= Clevan Thomas =

American football player (born 1979)

No. 8
- Position: Cornerback

Personal information
- Born: April 6, 1979 (age 47); Miami, Florida, U.S.
- Listed height: 5 ft 10 in (1.78 m)
- Listed weight: 199 lb (90 kg)

Career information
- High school: Senior (Miami)
- College: Florida State
- NFL draft: 2001: undrafted

Career history
- San Jose SaberCats (2002–2008); Arizona Rattlers (2010)*; San Jose SaberCats (2013–2015); Los Angeles Kiss (2016); Baltimore Brigade (2018)
- * Offseason or practice squad member only

Awards and highlights
- 4× ArenaBowl champion (2002, 2004, 2007, 2015); 3× AFL Defensive Player of the Year (2002, 2003, 2013); 4× First-team All-Arena (2002, 2003, 2007, 2013); 2× Second-team All-Arena (2006, 2008); AFL Defensive Back of the Year (2013); AFL Rookie of the Year (2002); AFL All-Rookie Team - DS (2002); AFL All-Ironman Team - DS/KR (2003); AFL 25 Greatest Players - #24 (2012); AFL Hall of Fame (2012); BCS national champion (1999); Second-team All-ACC (2000)

Career AFL statistics
- Tackles: 631
- INTs: 81
- Pass breakups: 164
- Forced fumbles: 16
- Fumble recoveries: 16
- Stats at ArenaFan.com

Clevan Nathaniel Thomas (born April 6, 1979) is an American former professional football cornerback who played in the Arena Football League (AFL). Along with Kenny McEntyre, he is regarded as one of the top defensive backs in arena football history. He spent ten of his seasons in the AFL with the SaberCats; over this span, he won four ArenaBowl championships and three AFL Defensive Player of the Year (DPOY) awards. In 2012, Thomas was inducted into the AFL Hall of Fame.

== Early life ==
Clevan Thomas was born on April 6, 1979, in Miami, Florida. He attended Miami High School, where he excelled as a football player (on both offense and defense); as a result of his stellar play, he was recruited by a number of the United States' top collegiate football programs (namely Clemson, Florida State, Florida, and Miami); he ultimately chose to play for the Florida State Seminoles (FSU). In 1997, as a freshman, Thomas saw immediate action (appearing in eight games); in 1998, as a sophomore, he appeared in all 13 of Florida State's games. In 1999, as a junior, Thomas emerged as a starter; he recorded 16 tackles and 3 interceptions for the Seminoles. Thomas also started the Sugar Bowl for Florida State, recording five tackles; his efforts helped the Seminoles defeat Virginia Tech, 46–29, to win a National Championship. The following year, the team again advanced to the National Championship Game; while Thomas was again a starter, Florida State lost to the Oklahoma Sooners by a score of 13–2. This game marked the end of Thomas' collegiate career.

== Professional career ==
=== First SaberCats stint (2002 to 2008) ===
Despite his accomplishments at Florida State, Thomas was not selected in the 2001 NFL draft. As a result, he signed with the San Jose SaberCats of the Arena Football League on December 18, 2001. In 2002, as a rookie, Thomas emerged as an instant superstar. He tallied 54 tackles (46 solo), 21 pass breakups, and six interceptions during the 14–game regular season; additionally, he returned 59 kicks for 1,353 yards and six touchdowns as San Jose's primary kick returner. For his efforts, he was named the AFL Rookie of the Year (ROY) and AFL Defensive Player of the Year (DPOY). He was also honored as a First Team All-Arena selection. Thomas' efforts helped propel the SaberCats to a then-record 13–1 regular season finish. The SaberCats would then win two playoff games to reach ArenaBowl XVI; there, they crushed the rival Arizona Rattlers in a 52–14 rout to capture the first championship in franchise history.

Thomas built upon his fantastic rookie campaign in 2003. That year, he recorded 37.5 tackles (34 solo), 20 pass breakups, and 13 interceptions (three of which were returned for touchdowns) despite playing in only 14 of the team's 16 regular season games; he also returned 61 kicks for 1,253 yards and four touchdowns. In light of this, Thomas was again named the AFL Defensive Player of the year; similarly, he was named a First Team All-Arena selection for the second consecutive year. Thomas' SaberCats again marched deep into the playoffs, but lost 62–49 to the Rattlers in the semi-finals.

Thomas' AFL career slowed somewhat in the mid-2000s. In 2004, he missed all but three games on account of injuries; as such, he recorded only 18 tackles (14 solo) and 1 interception (which he returned for a touchdown). Despite this setback, Thomas collected his second championship (while on the injured reserve) when the SaberCats defeated the Rattlers in ArenaBowl XVIII. In 2005, Thomas returned to action; while he played well (recording 49.5 tackles, 10 pass breakups, and 5 interceptions in 13 games), he failed to replicate the dominance of his first two seasons. The defending champion SaberCats reached the playoffs once again in 2005 (despite a pedestrian 9–7 regular season record); they were quickly ousted by the eventual champion Colorado Crush, 56–48, in the first round.

2006 marked a return to form for Thomas. His 87 tackles (79 solo) shattered his previous high of 55 (46 solo); he also posted 10 pass breakups and 7 interceptions. Thomas' steady play proved crucial for the SaberCats, who blundered their way to a 3–6 record through nine games; they would go on to win their final seven regular season games (and a playoff game) before narrowly losing to the Chicago Rush in the Conference Championship game. Thomas' resurgent season netted him a Second Team All-Arena selection.

In 2007, Thomas turned in arguably his most complete performance (to that point in his career). He contributed 78.5 tackles (69 solo), 20 pass breakups, and 9 interceptions (two of which were returned for touchdowns); his fantastic play helped the SaberCats to a 13–3 regular season finish. After missing the SaberCats' opening playoff game (a 76–67 victory over the Colorado Crush), Thomas made a triumphant return; in the American Conference Championship Game, against the Chicago Rush, he intercepted two errant Matt D'Orazio passes. The SaberCats' 61–49 victory, propelled them to ArenaBowl XXI, where they crushed the Columbus Destroyers by a score of 55–33; their victory gave Thomas his third AFL Championship in six years. For his efforts, he was named a First Team All-Arena selection; he lost the Defensive Player of the Year Award to defensive end Greg White. Thomas turned in a nearly identical performance in 2008 with 83 tackles (68 solo), 18 pass breakups, and nine interceptions (two of which were returned for touchdowns). He was rewarded with a Second Team All-Arena selection (his fifth career selection) at the end of the regular season. His dominance helped the SaberCats reach the playoffs for the ninth consecutive season; they ultimately advanced to ArenaBowl XXII, which they lost (59–56) to the Philadelphia Soul. The loss marked the end of Thomas' first stint with the SaberCats.

=== Hiatus (2009 to 2012) ===
Thomas' career was abruptly interrupted when the AFL, citing financial difficulties, abruptly folded. As a result, despite opportunities to play in other indoor football leagues (such as the AF2, Thomas sat out the entire 2009 season. In 2010, the league resumed operations, but the SaberCats did not. Prior to the start of the 2010 season, Thomas practiced with the Arizona Rattlers (who had resumed operations just prior), but did not join the team. The SaberCats resumed operations one year later in 2011, but Thomas remained inactive. By 2012, despite the lack of a formal announcement, it appeared that he had entered retirement; in light of this, he was elected to the Arena Football Hall of Fame. Thomas, despite spending only seven seasons in the AFL, had 50 career interceptions, tied for the second-highest total in AFL history. In 2012, the AFL released its 25 Greatest Players list; this list declared Thomas to have been the 24th greatest player in Arena Football League history.

=== Second SaberCats stint (2013 to 2015) ===
In 2013, Thomas abruptly rejoined the SaberCats. Given his lengthy absence, the move surprised many onlookers; additionally, questions remained about his potential effectiveness and durability. Thomas responded with the finest season of his career. In 2013, he tallied 74 tackles (65 solo), 25 pass breakups, and a career-high 15 interceptions (one shy of the league record) in 17 games. He returned an AFL-record 6 interceptions for touchdowns (the previous record was four). Five of the six interception returns came in the final four games of the regular season; put another way, Thomas recorded more interception returns in the final four games of the 2013 season than any AFL player had returned in an entire season. Thomas' incredible showing netted him a third Defensive Player of the Year Award (tying the mark set by Kenny McEntyre for the most in AFL history); he was also named a First Team All-Arena selection (his fourth career appearance on the First Team). Thomas' resurgence helped the SaberCats to a 13–5 finish; they lost to the defending champion Arizona Rattlers in the first round of the playoffs.

Thomas returned to the SaberCats in 2014. While his numbers dropped considerably from his 2013 campaign, he remained one of the league's best cornerbacks; in 2014, Thomas tallied 70.5 tackles (60 solo), 14 pass breakups, and 8 interceptions (one of which was returned for a touchdown) in a career-high 18 games. Thomas remained a key part of the SaberCats' top-ranked defense; despite this, he failed to garner any major awards in 2014. The SaberCats once again finished 13–5; while they won their first-round playoff game, they were again defeated by the Rattlers (this time in the Conference Championship game).

Thomas did not re-join the SaberCats at the start of the 2015 season, once again fueling speculation that he had retired. During the offseason, San Jose had acquired AFL superstar cornerback Virgil Gray; this served to bolster the belief that Thomas' career had reached its end. During a Week 3 contest against the Tampa Bay Storm, Gray suffered a season-ending knee injury; days later, the SaberCats announced Thomas' return to the team. Thomas continued to play well; in 15 games, he recorded 41 tackles (34 solo), 14 pass breakups, and 6 interceptions. In 2015, the SaberCats' defense was historically dominant (allowing just 36.8 points per game, the lowest such figure in modern AFL history); the SaberCats finished the regular season with 17–1 record (tied for the best in AFL history). Thomas' SaberCats won their first two playoff games to advance to ArenaBowl XXVIII, where they faced the Jacksonville Sharks. During the game, Thomas recovered a Michael Lindsay fumble deep in Jacksonville territory; the turnover resulted, shortly thereafter, in a key score for the SaberCats. San Jose would go on to win the game, 68–47, to claim the fourth championship in franchise history; it was also the fourth championship of Thomas' career.

=== Los Angeles Kiss ===
Thomas was assigned to the Los Angeles Kiss on March 31, 2016.

=== Baltimore Brigade ===
Thomas was assigned to the Baltimore Brigade on June 13, 2018.

== Legacy ==
Clevan Thomas remains one of the most decorated defensive players in Arena Football history. His three Defensive Player of the Year selections ties him with Kenny McEntyre for the most all-time; the 11-year gap between his first and last DPOY selections is the longest in AFL history. His 81 career interceptions rank second in league history, behind McEntyre's 97. Thomas remains the only player to earn either DPOY or First-Team All Arena selections after being inducted into the Hall of Fame; similarly, he remains the only player to start (and win) an ArenaBowl after his induction.

Thomas holds numerous San Jose SaberCats franchise records. He has been a part of all four of the SaberCats' ArenaBowl championship teams (XVI, XVIII, XXI, and XXVIII); he is the only person to have won all four as a player. He is the only player to have won four ArenaBowls with the same team in the 21st century.

His son Clevan Thomas Jr. is currently a wide receiver for Kentucky Wildcats football team.
