= Victor Hall (American football) =

American football player (born 1968)

No. 98, 87
- Position: Offensive lineman / Defensive lineman / Tight end

Personal information
- Born: December 4, 1968 (age 57); Anniston, Alabama, U.S.
- Listed height: 6 ft 4 in (1.93 m)
- Listed weight: 265 lb (120 kg)

Career information
- High school: Wellborn (Anniston)
- College: Auburn (1988–1991)
- NFL draft: 1992: undrafted

Career history
- Indianapolis Colts (1993)*; Orlando Predators (1994–1999); Barcelona Dragons (1995); Los Angeles Avengers (2000–2001); Florida Firecats (2004)
- * Offseason or practice squad member only

Awards and highlights
- ArenaBowl champion (1998); ArenaCup champion (2004); First-team All-Arena (2000); Second-team All-Arena (1997); AFL All-Ironman Team (2000); First-team All-SEC (1991)

Career AFL statistics
- Receptions: 25
- Receiving yards: 255
- Receiving TDs: 5
- Tackles: 104
- Sacks: 21
- Stats at ArenaFan.com

Victor Hall (born December 4, 1968) is an American former professional football player who played eight seasons in the Arena Football League (AFL) with the Orlando Predators and Los Angeles Avengers. He is the head coach for the Middle Georgia State Knights. After being involved in a life-threatening car accident when he was a 17-year-old high school student, Hall enrolled at Auburn University to play college football. While at Auburn, he set the Peach Bowl single-game receptions record in 1990 and earned first-team All-Southeastern Conference (SEC) honors in 1991. In 1992, Hall became the youngest police chief in Alabama history. He signed with the NFL's Indianapolis Colts in 1993 but was released during training camp. He then played in the AFL from 1994 to 2001, and was a member of four Predators teams that advanced to the ArenaBowl. Hall was also a two-time All-Arena selection. After his playing career, he coached at the professional, high school, and college levels. In 2019, he was named head coach of the Middle Georgia State Knights.

== Early life ==
Victor Hall was born on December 4, 1968, in Anniston, Alabama. He was 6 feet 1 inch (1.85 m) in sixth grade and could dunk a basketball; his mother carried his birth certificate to prove his age. Hall played high school football at Wellborn High School in Anniston as a defensive tackle and earned all-state honors. On March 11, 1986, when Hall was 17 years old, he fell asleep while driving a car and ran off the road. An observer helped Hall, who was conscious and holding his left ear, out of the wreckage. He underwent two operations, during which his ear was reattached and over 1,000 sutures were used on his face and chest. His heart and breathing each stopped twice while he was on the operating table; he was considered clinically dead before he was resuscitated by the doctors. Hall took cortisone injections in his face for six months to help with healing. In football, Hall was named to the Montgomery Advertiser's "Dynamite Dozen". He also played basketball and baseball in high school.

== College career ==
In 1987, Hall enrolled at Auburn University to play college football for the Auburn Tigers. He was moved to tight end at Auburn. He had to sit out the 1987 season due to not meeting NCAA Proposition 48 academic requirements. He had shoulder surgery before the start of the 1988 season. Hall dressed for his first career game on October 15, 1988, against Akron, but did not play in the game. The Auburn coaches then informed Hall that they wanted to redshirt him for the remainder of the year. He was later a three-year letterman from 1989 to 1991. He caught 19 passes for 190 yards in 1989, 16 passes for 120 yards and one touchdown in 1990, and 19 passes for 211 yards and one touchdown in 1991. Hall had a Peach Bowl-record nine receptions in the 1990 Peach Bowl victory over Indiana. He was named first-team All-Southeastern Conference by the league's coaches his senior year in 1991. He graduated with a Bachelor of Arts in criminal justice.

== Professional career ==
Hall signed with the NFL's Indianapolis Colts on April 30, 1993. He was later rear-ended in a minor car accident. As a result, he suffered a sprained neck and back and could not pass the Colts' physical. On July 17, 1993, he was the first cut during Colts' training camp.

Hall played in all 12 games for the Orlando Predators of the Arena Football League (AFL) in 1994, recording 19 solo tackles, seven assisted tackles, six sacks, one forced fumble, two fumble recoveries, one interception, and five pass breakups. His six sacks were tied for second most in the league that year. He was an offensive lineman/defensive lineman during his AFL career as the league played under ironman rules. Hall also spent time at center during the 1994 season. Orlando finished the year with an 11–1 record and advanced to ArenaBowl VIII, where they lost to the Arizona Rattlers by a score of 36–31.

In February 1995, Hall was selected by the Barcelona Dragons of the World League of American Football (WLAF) in the 1995 WLAF draft. He posted six sacks and one interception for 32 yards for the Dragons during the 1995 WLAF season.

Hall was activated by the Predators on July 7, 1995, and played in the final five games of the 1995 season. Hall advanced to the ArenaBowl for the second year in a row, this time losing to the Tampa Bay Storm in ArenaBowl IX by a margin of 48–35. Hall appeared in all 14 games in 1996, totaling 19 solo tackles, five assisted tackles, one sack, two forced fumbles, one fumble recovery, 14 pass breakups, and seven catches for 54 yards as the Predators went 9–5. They lost in the first round of the 1996 playoffs to the Rattlers. Hall played in all 14 games for the second straight season in 1997, recording 16 solo tackles, four assisted tackles, 2.5 sacks, three forced fumbles, two fumble recoveries, one interception, six pass breakups, one blocked kick, and six receptions for 55 yards and two touchdowns. He was named second-team All-Arena for his performance during the 1997 season. Orlando had a 10–4 record and lost in the semifinals to the Iowa Barnstormers. Hall played in only two games during the 1998 season before suffering a season-ending ruptured Achilles tendon. On August 23, 1998, the Predators won ArenaBowl XII against the Storm. On May 1, 1999, against the Barnstormers, Hall suffered body cramps due to severe dehydration. He appeared in ten games overall in 1999, posting eight solo tackles, three assisted tackles, two sacks, and one forced fumble. Orlando finished the 1999 season 7–7 and eventually advanced to Hall's fourth career ArenaBowl, this time losing 59–48 to the Albany Firebirds.

On December 17, 1999, Hall was traded to the Los Angeles Avengers for future considerations. He played in all 14 games for Los Angeles during the 2000 season, accumulating 11 solo tackles, 15 assisted tackles, five sacks, one fumble recovery, four pass breakups, and a career-high ten receptions for 141 yards and three touchdowns. Hall earned first-team All-Arena and All-Ironman Team honors. Despite Hall's strong year, the Avengers went 3–11. He was placed on injured reserve on April 24, 2001, and activated on May 25, 2001. He played in 11 games overall during his final AFL season in 2001, recording five solo tackles, eight assisted tackles, two sacks, one pass breakup, and two catches for five yards. Hall was released by the Avengers on December 10, 2001.

== Coaching career ==
Hall was the line coach for the Florida Firecats of the af2 in 2003. In 2004, he unretired as a player and posted 15 tackles and two sacks for the Firecats, helping them win ArenaCup V. He then returned to the team's coaching staff, serving as the assistant head coach and line coach from 2005 to 2009. The af2 folded after the 2009 season. Hall was the head coach at Florida Christian Institute High School and an assistant coach at Cape Coral High School and at Southwest Florida Christian Academy.

In October 2011, Hall joined the Florida Tarpons of the Ultimate Indoor Football League as an assistant coach. In August 2012, he became the defensive line coach for the Webber International Warriors of Webber International University. He served Bill Walsh Diversity Coaching Fellowships with the Pittsburgh Steelers in 2015 and the Cleveland Browns in 2016. He was the defensive coordinator of the Middle Georgia State Knights of Middle Georgia State University in 2017, and the team's offensive coordinator and associate head coach in 2018. Hall became Middle Georgia State's head coach in 2019.

== Personal life ==
In September 1992, Hall was named the police chief of Hobson City, Alabama. The Orlando Sentinel noted that Hall was the youngest police chief in Alabama history. He continued to serve as chief throughout his pro football career. Hall later graduated from Parkwood University with a master's degree and a PhD in criminal justice.

Hall started the New Start Vision Foundation to help homeless teens. He founded two alternative schools in Fort Myers, Florida. He has also spent time as a school principal.
