= David Veikune =

American gridiron football player (born 1985)

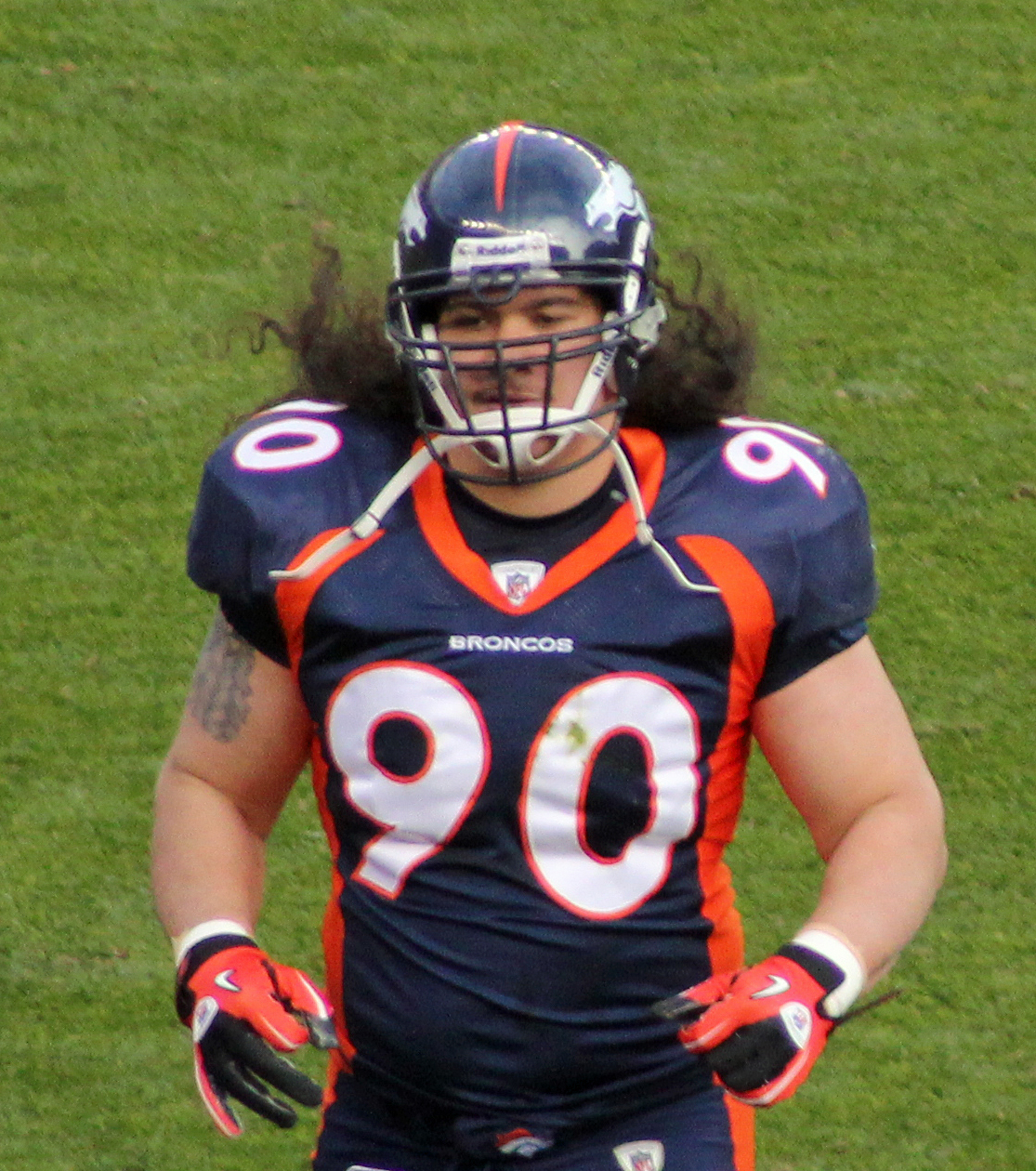
- Veikune with Denver Broncos in 2010

No. 57, 90, 94
- Position: Defensive end

Personal information
- Born: December 12, 1985 (age 40); Anchorage, Alaska, U.S.
- Listed height: 6 ft 3 in (1.91 m)
- Listed weight: 265 lb (120 kg)

Career information
- High school: James Campbell (ʻEwa Beach, Hawaii)
- College: Hawaii
- NFL draft: 2009: 2nd round, 52nd overall pick

Career history
- Cleveland Browns (2009); Denver Broncos (2010); Saskatchewan Roughriders (2011−2013); Los Angeles Kiss (2014)

Awards and highlights
- First-team All-WAC (2007); Second-team All-WAC (2008)

Career NFL statistics
- Total tackles: 5
- Stats at Pro Football Reference

Career AFL statistics
- Total tackles: 2
- Stats at ArenaFan.com

David Fa'otusia Veikune (born December 12, 1985) is an American former professional football player who was a defensive end in the National Football League (NFL). He played college football for the Hawaii Warriors and was selected by the Cleveland Browns in the second round of the 2009 NFL draft.

He has also played for the Denver Broncos of the NFL, the Saskatchewan Roughriders of the Canadian Football League (CFL), and the Los Angeles Kiss of the Arena Football League (AFL).

== Early life ==
Veikune played high school football at Campbell High School in 'Ewa Beach, Hawai'i. As a senior, he posted 92 tackles, 26 tfl's and 16.5 sacks. Top games: in a win over Waianae his senior year, he had 17 total stops (six solo), three tackles for loss, seven sacks, one forced fumble, one recovered fumble and a blocked PAT; against Leilehua that season he finished with 21 tackles (six solo), with one forced fumble and one recovered fumble. He was named 1st team by the Star Bulletin and the Honolulu Advertiser. An interesting accolade Veikune earned his junior and senior year was the Larry Price All-Katoosh Team, which is a list of the state’s 11 hardest hitters.

== College career ==
=== Colorado ===
He started his career at the University of Colorado at Boulder where he was redshirted in 2004.

=== Fresno City College ===
He transferred to Fresno City College where he spent a year. He earned All-Northern California honorable mention.

=== Hawaii ===
Later he transferred to the University of Hawaii at Manoa where he saw action as a special teamer and as backup in 2006. In 2007, Veikune was named a 1st team ALL-WAC Selection even though he never started a game. He led the WAC in sacks with seven (pre-bowl). In 2008, Veikune earned a 2nd team ALL-WAC Selection after he was the team's third leading tackler with 73 and was among the WAC's leaders with 16.5 tackles for loss and nine sacks. He played Defensive tackle and Defensive end at Hawaii. He also had 11 quarterback hurries and forced four fumbles.

He was invited to play in the 2009 Senior Bowl to play for the South Team.

== Professional career ==
Pre-draft measurables
Height	Weight	Arm length	Hand span	40-yard dash	10-yard split	20-yard split	20-yard shuttle	Three-cone drill	Vertical jump	Broad jump	Bench press	Wonderlic
6 ft 3 in (1.91 m)	257 lb (117 kg)	34.3 in (0.87 m)	10 in (0.25 m)	4.75 s	1.58 s	2.76 s	4.46 s	7.20 s	33 in (0.84 m)	9 ft 2 in (2.79 m)	35 reps	28
40 (and splits) from Hawaii Pro Day, all others from NFL Combine.

=== Cleveland Browns ===
Veikune was selected by the Cleveland Browns in the second round (52nd overall) of the 2009 NFL draft. He was taken one pick before Pro Bowler LeSean McCoy, although the Browns were already starting Jamal Lewis at tailback. The pick was acquired from the New York Jets in an earlier trade that allowed the Jets to draft quarterback Mark Sanchez.

Veikune appeared in 10 games on kick return as a rookie. He tore his mcl on the last practice of the year and was placed on season-ending injured reserve on January 2, 2010.

Veikune was waived by the Browns on September 7, 2010.

=== Denver Broncos ===
On November 17, 2010, Veikune signed with the Denver Broncos and was a top special team player for the remaining 2010 season. He was waived the following season on August 29, 2011.

=== Saskatchewan Roughriders ===
On November 3, 2011, it was announced that Veikune had signed with the Saskatchewan Roughriders.

On May 31, 2013, Veikune was released by the Riders before training camp started because he had a high ankle sprain that wouldn't heal until the end of the season.

=== Los Angeles Kiss ===
On October 1, 2013, Veikune was assigned to the expansion Los Angeles Kiss of the Arena Football League.
