= Matthew Masifilo =

American football player (born 1989)

No. 65, 95
- Position: Center

Personal information
- Born: October 1, 1989 (age 37) ʻEwa Beach, Hawaii, U.S.
- Listed height: 6 ft 3 in (1.91 m)
- Listed weight: 280 lb (127 kg)

Career information
- High school: James Campbell (ʻEwa Beach)
- College: Stanford
- NFL draft: 2012: undrafted

Career history
- San Francisco 49ers (2012)*; Tampa Bay Buccaneers (2012–2015); Carolina Panthers (2016)*
- * Offseason or practice squad member only

Career NFL statistics
- Games played: 3
- Stats at Pro Football Reference

Matthew Masifilo (born October 1, 1989) is an American former professional football player who was a center in the National Football League (NFL). He played college football for the Stanford Cardinal.

== College career ==
Masifilo began attending Stanford University in 2007, playing under head coach Jim Harbaugh. He sat out his entire freshman season but received the Greg Pier's award for being the best scout team player.

As a redshirt freshman in 2008, he played in 12 games, starting 4 of them. In a game against Washington, Masifilo finished with a season-high 5 tackles. On October 18, he received his first career start at nose tackle against UCLA. He started the next three games against Washington State, Oregon, and USC. He finished the season with a total of 22 tackles, 11 of them being solo.

The following year, he began the season as the Cardinal's starting defensive tackle but was limited to only 8 games after suffering a knee injury during the second game against Wake Forest. On October 24, Masifilo made his return after missing 5 consecutive games, finishing with 4 tackles while helping Stanford in a victory over Arizona State. On November 14, he made his first career interception, picking USC quarterback, Matt Barkley off in the first quarter. He finished the last game of the season making 6 tackles, including one for a loss, in the Sun Bowl against the Oklahoma Sooners.

In 2010, Masifilo moves from defensive tackle to defensive end. On October 30, he had one of his best games of his collegiate career against Washington, finishing with a season-high 5 tackles, 2 sacks, and a forced fumble. He had his first complete season, starting all 13 games, and finished with 33 total tackles, 4.5 tackles for a loss, 4 sacks, a forced fumble, and a fumble recovery.

Masiflio returned in 2011 as a fifth-year senior. With the departure of head coach Jim Harbaugh, he played his last collegiate season under new head coach David Shaw. On November 12, 2011, he had one of his best games, finishing with a season-high 7 tackles, 3 tackle for a loss, and 2 sacks against Oregon. He played his last career collegiate game on January 2, 2012, finishing with only 4 tackles against Oregon State. For the second consecutive year, he started all 13 games, and also finished with a career-high 34 tackles, 8 tackles for a loss, and 2.5 sacks.

== Professional career ==
=== San Francisco 49ers ===
Masifilo went undrafted in the 2012 NFL draft but was signed as an undrafted free agent by the San Francisco 49ers on April 29.

=== Tampa Bay Buccaneers ===
After being waived by the 49ers, Masifilo was signed by the Tampa Bay Buccaneers. He was signed to the active roster of the Tampa Bay Buccaneers on November 17, 2012. On August 30, 2013, Masifilo was waived by the Buccaneers as a part of the team's final roster cuts; he was subsequently re-signed to the team's practice squad.

Masifilo was once again released during final roster cuts on August 30, 2014. However, he remained with the team after re-signing to the team's practice squad. Masifilo was promoted to the active roster on October 31.

On January 2, 2015, Masifilo signed a reserve/futures contract with the Buccaneers. He was waived by Tampa Bay on October 25.

=== Carolina Panthers ===
Masifilo signed a reserve/futures contract with the Carolina Panthers on January 6, 2016. It was a one-year contract worth up to $600,000. Although Masifilo had spent his entire career on the defensive line, the Panthers moved him to center, although he had no experience ever playing the position. On August 28, Masifilo was waived by the Panthers.
