= Lenzie Jackson =

American football player (born 1977)

No. 81
- Position: Wide receiver

Personal information
- Born: June 17, 1977 (age 49); Santa Clara, California
- Listed height: 6 ft 0 in (1.83 m)
- Listed weight: 191 lb (87 kg)

Career information
- High school: Milpitas (CA)
- College: Arizona State
- NFL draft: 1999: undrafted

Career history
- Jacksonville Jaguars (1999); Oakland Raiders (2000)*; Cleveland Browns (2000); Pittsburgh Steelers (2001–2002); Carolina Cobras (2004); Columbus Destroyers (2005); Los Angeles Avengers (2006–2007)
- * Offseason or practice squad member only

Career NFL statistics
- Receptions: 1
- Receiving yards: 5
- Stats at Pro Football Reference
- Stats at ArenaFan.com

Lenzie Maurice Jackson (born June 17, 1977) is a retired National Football League kick returner and Arena Football League wide receiver/defensive back.

== High school years ==
Jackson attended Milpitas High School in Milpitas, California and was a letterman in football and track & field.

== College career ==
Jackson played college football for the Arizona State Sun Devils.

== Professional career ==
Jackson played in the NFL for the Jacksonville Jaguars (1999), the Cleveland Browns (2000), and the Pittsburgh Steelers (2001–2002). He played in the AFL for the Carolina Cobras (2004), the Columbus Destroyers (2005), and the Los Angeles Avengers (2006–2007).
