= Lonnie Ford =

American football player (born 1979)

Profile
- Position: Fullback–defensive end

Personal information
- Born: February 21, 1979 (age 47)

Career information
- College: USC Trojans

Career history
- Carolina Panthers (2002)*; Los Angeles Avengers (2003–2008)
- * Offseason or practice squad member only

Lonnie Ford (born February 21, 1979) is an American former football fullback–defensive end who played for the Los Angeles Avengers.

== Biography ==
Ford attended Morse High School in San Diego, California, then attended the University of Southern California.

Ford signed a free agent contract with the Carolina Panthers following the 2002 NFL draft, but was released. He played for the Avengers from 2003 until the franchise folded in 2008.
