= Silas Demary =

American football player (born 1971)

Profile
- Position: Defensive lineman

Personal information
- Born: December 12, 1971 (age 54); Bishopville, South Carolina, U.S.
- Listed height: 6 ft 3 in (1.91 m)
- Listed weight: 285 lb (129 kg)

Career information
- College: Virginia State

Career history
- Carolina Cobras (2001); Buffalo Destroyers (2002–2003); Los Angeles Avengers (2004–2007); Cleveland Gladiators (2008)

Awards and highlights
- AFL All-Rookie Team (2001); AFL Defensive Player of the Year (2005); AFL Lineman of the Year (2005); First Team All-Arena (2005); Second Team All-Arena (2007)

Career AFL statistics
- Tackles: 99
- Sacks: 34.5
- Force fumbles: 10
- Fumble recoveries: 4
- Interceptions: 1
- Stats at ArenaFan.com

Silas Jackie Demary Sr. (born December 12, 1971) is an American former offensive lineman/defensive lineman for in the Arena Football League (AFL). He played for the Carolina Cobras, Buffalo Destroyers, Los Angeles Avengers and the Cleveland Gladiators. He is most notable for winning the Arena Football League Defensive Player of the Year Award in 2005, while a member of the Avengers.

== Early life ==
While attending Bishopville High School in Bishopville, South Carolina, Demary lettered in football and basketball.

== College career ==
Silas Demary attended Virginia State University, where, as a senior, he led the team with 21 sacks, won NCAA Division II Defensive Lineman of the Year honors, and won NCAA Division II All-America honors.

== Professional career ==
=== Carolina Cobras ===
Demary signed with the Carolina Cobras in 2001. He was named to the All-Rookie Team following the season.

=== Buffalo Destroyers ===
In 2002 and 2003, Demary played for the Buffalo Destroyers. Playing mostly offensive line, Demary recorded very few stats with the Destroyers.

=== Los Angeles Avengers ===
In 2004 through 2007, Demary played with the Los Angeles Avengers. While an Avenger, Demary had the best seasons of his professional career, twice being named to the All Arena Teams, and winning the Arena Football League Defensive Player of the Year Award in 2005. Also in 2005, Demary set the AFL record for sacks in a season with 13.5. The previous record had been 13, held by Craig Walls.

=== Cleveland Gladiators ===
Demary finished his AFL career while playing with the Cleveland Gladiators in 2008.
