= Rob Turner =

American football player (born 1984)

Robert Turner
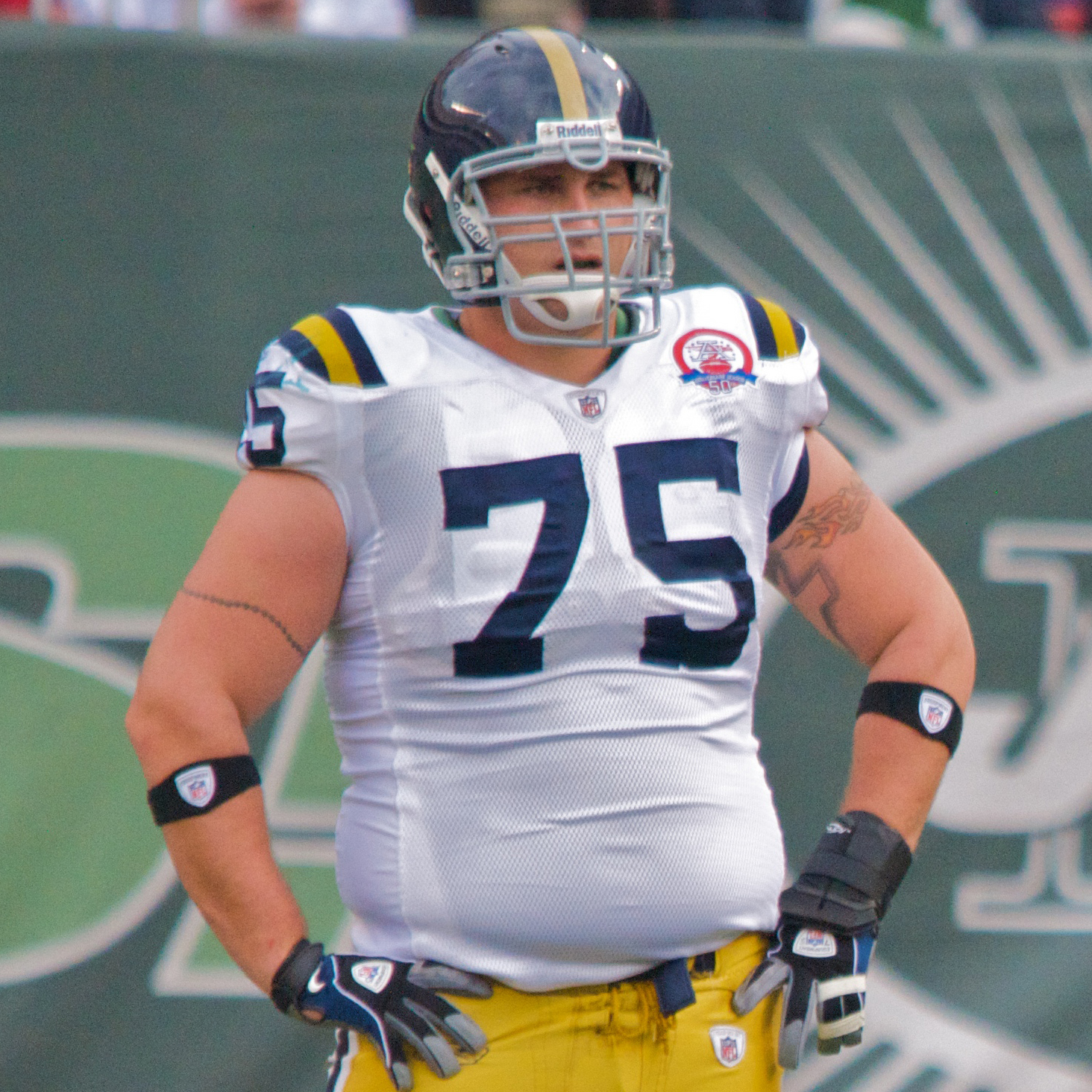
- Turner playing for the New York Jets in 2009.

No. 75, 59
- Position: Guard / Center

Personal information
- Born: August 20, 1984 (age 42); Austin, Texas, U.S.
- Listed height: 6 ft 4 in (1.93 m)
- Listed weight: 308 lb (140 kg)

Career information
- High school: Lake Travis (Austin)
- College: New Mexico
- NFL draft: 2007: undrafted

Career history
- New York Jets (2007–2011); St. Louis Rams (2012); Tennessee Titans (2013); Chicago Bears (2014)*
- * Offseason or practice squad member only

Awards and highlights
- 2× First-team All-MW (2005, 2006)

Career NFL statistics
- Games played: 63
- Games started: 24
- Fumble recoveries: 2
- Stats at Pro Football Reference

Robert Wayne Turner II (born August 20, 1984) is an American former professional football player who was an offensive lineman in the National Football League (NFL) from 2007 to 2014. He played college football for the New Mexico Lobos and was signed by the New York Jets as an undrafted free agent in 2007. He later played for the St. Louis Rams, Tennessee Titans and Chicago Bears.

== Early life and college ==
Turner was born in Texas and starred for Texas football powerhouse Lake Travis High School, before their rise to greatness; graduating in 2003.

In his four years of college at the University of New Mexico, Turner started 45 games for the Lobos as a right guard and right tackle. A wrist injury plagued him during his final two years which caused teams to shy away from drafting him.

== Professional career ==
=== New York Jets ===
Turner was signed by the New York Jets as an undrafted free agent out of New Mexico on May 16, 2007. Turner was waived during the final roster cuts on September 1, 2007 before signing on to the team's practice squad on September 3. Turner was promoted to the active roster on December 19, 2007. Turner made his professional debut against the Tennessee Titans on December 23, 2007. Turner was well known for his versatility and was utilized on offense, defense and special teams with the Jets.

Turner was placed on the injured reserve list on September 27, 2011 after suffering a broken ankle in the preseason.

=== St. Louis Rams ===
Turner signed with the St. Louis Rams on March 30, 2012.

=== Tennessee Titans ===
Turner signed with the Tennessee Titans on March 19, 2013.

=== Chicago Bears ===
Turner signed with the Chicago Bears on August 10, 2014. The Bears released Turner on August 29, 2014.
