= Kevin Ingram (arena football) =

American football player (born 1977)

No. 5
- Position: Wide receiver / Defensive back

Personal information
- Born: June 19, 1977 (age 49)
- Listed height: 6 ft 1 in (1.85 m)
- Listed weight: 195 lb (88 kg)

Career information
- High school: Levittown (PA) Harry S. Truman
- College: West Chester (PA)

Career history
- Indiana Firebirds (2001); Los Angeles Avengers (2002–2008); Arizona Rattlers (2010)*
- * Offseason or practice squad member only

Awards and highlights
- 2× First Team All-Arena (2004, 2005); Second Team All-Arena (2006); 2× All-Ironman Team (2004, 2008); U.S. Army All-Ironman Team (2005); Ironman of the Year (2005)

Career AFL statistics
- Receptions: 533
- Receiving yards: 6,175
- Tackles: 310
- Interceptions: 24
- Total touchdowns: 149
- Stats at ArenaFan.com

Kevin C. Ingram (born June 19, 1977) is an American former professional football player, who played in the Arena Football League (AFL) as a wide receiver/defensive back for the Los Angeles Avengers.

== Early life ==
At Harry S. Truman High School in Levittown, Pennsylvania, Ingram was a two-time All-League performer as both a wide receiver and defensive back in football. Ingram also earned All-League honors twice in basketball and once in baseball. Ingram has been inducted into the Harry S. Truman Hall of Fame.

== College career ==
A two-time (1998–99) Associated Press "Little" All-America selection at West Chester (Pa.) University, Ingram holds the all-time school records for catches (235) and receiving yards (3,159). He is also second all-time in touchdown receptions (45) and points scored (278), and fifth in all-purpose yardage (3,507) for the Golden Rams. In 1999, Ingram was chosen as the PSAC East Player of the Year after making 82 catches for 1,050 yards and 16 touchdowns. Ingram holds an NCAA record for yards in a game with 401 yards on 13 catches.

== Arena Football career ==
Kevin Ingram, one of the Arena Football League's premier players, lead the Los Angeles Avenger's franchise in games played (98), receptions (536), all-purpose yards (9,523), kickoff return yards (2,871) and first downs (308). He also has made a significant contribution on defense during his seven-year Avenger career, ranking second in team history in both tackles (308.5) and interceptions (25). Ingram has returned three of his team-record 25 interceptions for touchdowns and also has scored three times as a kickoff returner and twice as a runner. In 2005, Ingram was honored with the AFL's most prestigious individual award when he was selected as the "U.S. Army Ironman of the Year," which is given to the league's top two-way player. Ingram has returned three of his team-record 24 interceptions for touchdowns and also has scored three times as a kickoff returner and twice as a runner.

In 2008, Ingram caught 97 passes for 999 yards and 23 touchdowns.

In 2007, he caught 103 passes for 1,196 yards and 26 touchdowns in just 11 games. A fractured right thumb sidelined Ingram for five regular-season games. He averaged a career-high 142.7 all-purpose yards per game for the 2007 Avengers. In 2006, Ingram led Los Angeles in receiving with 111 catches for 1,354 yards and 32 touchdowns, which are all career highs. On the other side of the football, he had 47 tackles and a team-high five interceptions. On April 9, 2006, Ingram had a career-high four touchdown receptions at Kansas City.

In 2005, he was selected as the AFL's U.S. Army Ironman of the Year, after having an outstanding season in all phases of the game. On offense, Ingram led the team with 88 receptions for 1,052 yards and 23 touchdowns. Defensively, he led the Avengers with six interceptions and was second on the club with 68 tackles. In addition, Ingram led Los Angeles in kickoff returns and averaged a team-high 104.1 all-purpose yards per game. After that stellar performance, it was no surprise that he was named to the league's All-Arena first team and All-Ironman squads for the second consecutive season. Ingram was named the U.S. Army Ironman of the Game six times during the 2005 season. His most memorable game occurred on May 7, 2005, when he returned one of his three interceptions for a touchdown with 31 seconds remaining to lift the Avengers to a 54–42 victory at San Jose, which put Los Angeles in position to capture its first Western Division title.

In 2004, Ingram was also a strong candidate for "U.S. Army Ironman of the Year" honors after catching 67 passes for 848 yards and 22 touchdowns. He also led the 2004 Avengers in kickoff returns (50 for 956 yards) and tackles (76.5). In addition, Ingram tied for the team lead in interceptions with four. He was voted the "Ironman of the Game" five times in 2004, and was selected by the AFL as the "Defensive Player of the Week" after deflecting a pass with no time remaining to preserve a 62–55 victory over Las Vegas on Feb. 14, 2004.

Ingram also was a strong candidate for All-Arena and All-Ironman honors in 2003, before a fractured fibula cost him the final three games of the season. He wound up the 2003 campaign with 35 receptions for 355 yards and 10 touchdowns. Ingram also was second on the team with four interceptions and third in tackles with 43.5. He was voted the "Ironman of the Game" four times in 2003, and selected by the AFL as "Ironman of the Week" after he caught two touchdown passes, had an interception, a fumble recovery and five tackles in a victory over Grand Rapids on March 23.

Ingram started 13 games for the Avengers in 2002, finishing with 36 receptions for 389 yards and six touchdowns (third on the team in all three categories). On the defensive side, Ingram tied Greg Hopkins (who won the AFL "Ironman of the Year" award that year) for the team lead in interceptions with five. He had a breakout game and earned game "M.V.P." honors on the road against the Toronto Phantoms on June 27, 2002, catching a team-high five passes for 92 yards and a touchdown, while also intercepting a pass in the last minute and returning it 49 yards for the game-winning score. As a rookie with the Indiana Firebirds in 2001, Ingram got caught in the shuffle behind two of the best receivers in league history ("Touchdown" Eddie Brown and Greg Hopkins). He was acquired by the Avengers in a trade on Dec. 10, 2001. He was named First Team All-Arena in 2004 and 2005. He was also named Second Team All-Arena in 2006.
