= San Jose SaberCats =

Arena football team

Logo

General information
- Founded: 1995
- Folded: 2015
- Headquartered: SAP Center in San Jose, California
- Colors: Saber gold, coral green, platinum, black, and Navajo white
- TheSanJoseSaberCats.com

Personnel
- Owners: John Fry; William Randy Fry; David Fry; Kathryn J. Kolder; Darren Arbet

Nickname
- Cats

Team history
- San Jose SaberCats (1995–2015)

Home fields
- SAP Center (1995–2008, 2011–2015); Stockton Arena (2015 playoffs and ArenaBowl XXVIII)

League / conference affiliations
- Arena Football League (1995–2008, 2011–2015): American Conference (1995–2008); Western Division (1995–2008); National Conference (2011–2015); Western Division (2011–2013); Pacific Division (2014–2015)

Championships
- League championships: 4: 2002, 2004, 2007, 2015
- Conference championships: 3: 2007, 2008, 2015; Prior to 2005, the AFL did not have conference championship games
- Division championships: 10: Western: 1995, 2000, 2001, 2002, 2003, 2006, 2007, 2008, 2015; Pacific: 2014, 2015

Playoff appearances (16)
- 1995, 1997, 1998, 2000, 2001, 2002, 2003, 2004, 2005, 2006, 2007, 2008, 2012, 2013, 2014, 2015

The San Jose SaberCats were a professional arena football team based in San Jose, California. The SaberCats had been members of the Arena Football League (AFL) since 1995 (the year in which the team was founded); and until 2015, they belonged to the AFL's National Conference. Over nineteen seasons of play, the SaberCats emerged as one of the Arena Football League's most successful franchises; at the conclusion of the 2015 season, the SaberCats boasted a lifetime regular season record of 198–98. Moreover, the SaberCats had won a total of four AFL Championships (2002, 2004, 2007, and 2015). Their lifetime postseason record stood at 19–12.

In the club's first four seasons (1995–1998), the team played just above mediocre, but still qualified for the playoffs three out of the four years, losing in the opening round each time under the guidance of Todd Shell. In 1999, the SaberCats appointed eventual owner-general manager Darren Arbet to the position of head coach. Under Arbet's guidance, the team's fortunes improved dramatically. In 2000, the SaberCats won a post-season game.

The SaberCats' run of success intensified in the 2000s; during that time, they won seven division titles and played in three American Conference championship games. In 2002, the team captured its first ArenaBowl championship by defeating the Arizona Rattlers in ArenaBowl XVI. In 2004, the SaberCats won a second championship by defeating the Rattlers in ArenaBowl XVIII. In 2007, they defeated the Columbus Destroyers in ArenaBowl XXI to capture a third championship. In 2008, the SaberCats returned to the ArenaBowl, only to fall to the Philadelphia Soul. In 2015, the SaberCats returned to the ArenaBowl, defeating the Jacksonville Sharks.

The 2009 demise of the AFL caused the SaberCats to take a two-year hiatus. They returned to the re-formed Arena Football League in 2011 (along with several other franchises). The SaberCats posted a disappointing record of 7–11 in the season of their return. The losing season was the organization's first since 1999 and remained the worst in franchise history. While the SaberCats' regular season performance improved greatly over the following three seasons (between 2012 and 2014, they went 38–16), their postseason performance did not; over that span, they went 1–3 (with all three losses coming at the hands of the Arizona Rattlers, who subsequently won the ArenaBowl in each season). In 2015, the SaberCats finished the regular season with a franchise-best record of 17–1. After dispatching the Portland Thunder easily in the first round of the playoffs, they again faced the Rattlers; this time, however, San Jose emerged victorious. For a list of all seasons, see List of San Jose SaberCats seasons

On November 12, 2015, the league announced the SaberCats would be ceasing operations due to "reasons unrelated to League operations." A statement from the league indicated that the AFL was working to secure new, long-term owners for the franchise, but no such group has emerged. In 2019, it was announced that the Indoor Football League would be expanding to Oakland with the Oakland Panthers, bringing arena football back to the Bay Area for the first time since the SaberCats demise. The Panthers ended up moving to the SAP Center in 2022 as the Bay Area Panthers.

== History ==
=== Original AFL (1995–2008) ===
The SaberCats came into existence in December 1994, when the Arena Football League awarded an expansion team to businesswoman Ramune Ambrozaitis, Lafayette attorney David Frey and John Fry of Fry's Electronics. The group of three owners got a bargain when they were awarded the franchise, paying only US$750,000 of the $1.25 million the AFL typically requested of an expansion team. The team played at the San Jose Arena in San Jose, California, which is also home to the San Jose Sharks franchise of the National Hockey League. The SaberCats named Todd Shell, a former San Francisco 49ers linebacker, as the team's first head coach. The SaberCats competed in the Western Division of the American Conference. The SaberCats are one of Arena's premier organizations, having never drawn below 10,000 fans at any of their home games. The SaberCats were ArenaBowl champions in 2002, 2004, and 2007, beating the Arizona Rattlers for their first two titles and the Columbus Destroyers for the third. The San Jose SaberCats did play in a fourth ArenaBowl, ArenaBowl XXII, but lost to the Philadelphia Soul. ArenaBowl XXII would be the last game played in the originally incarnation of the AFL.

On June 5, 2004, the SaberCats were fined $20,000 for violations during their quarterfinal round playoff game against the Tampa Bay Storm. They were first fined $10,000 for distributing cow bells, without advance approval, to fans entering the building, which was cited as a violation by the AFL as an intentional competitive advantage generated by the creation of artificial noise. Also, during the game itself, the SaberCats refused to apply microphones to certain players and coaches during the NBC broadcast, which led to an additional $10,000 fine.

The cowbells went on to become a mainstay of many perennial season ticket holders, even though the SaberCats never again distributed cowbells to fans after the incident in 2004.

San Jose was 9–7 in 2005, earning the fourth seed in the American Conference playoffs. They lost to #1 seed Colorado Crush 56–48 in the first round, after failing to score on six goal line opportunities in the final minute of play.

The SaberCats went 10–6 in 2006 and won a division title in the process, along with the AC's #2 seed. They got a bye week from the wild-card round and then beat the Arizona Rattlers in the divisional round, 62–48. Because the Colorado Crush (the AC's #1 seed) lost in the divisional round to the Chicago Rush, they hosted the American Conference Championship game; however, they lost the game, 59–56.

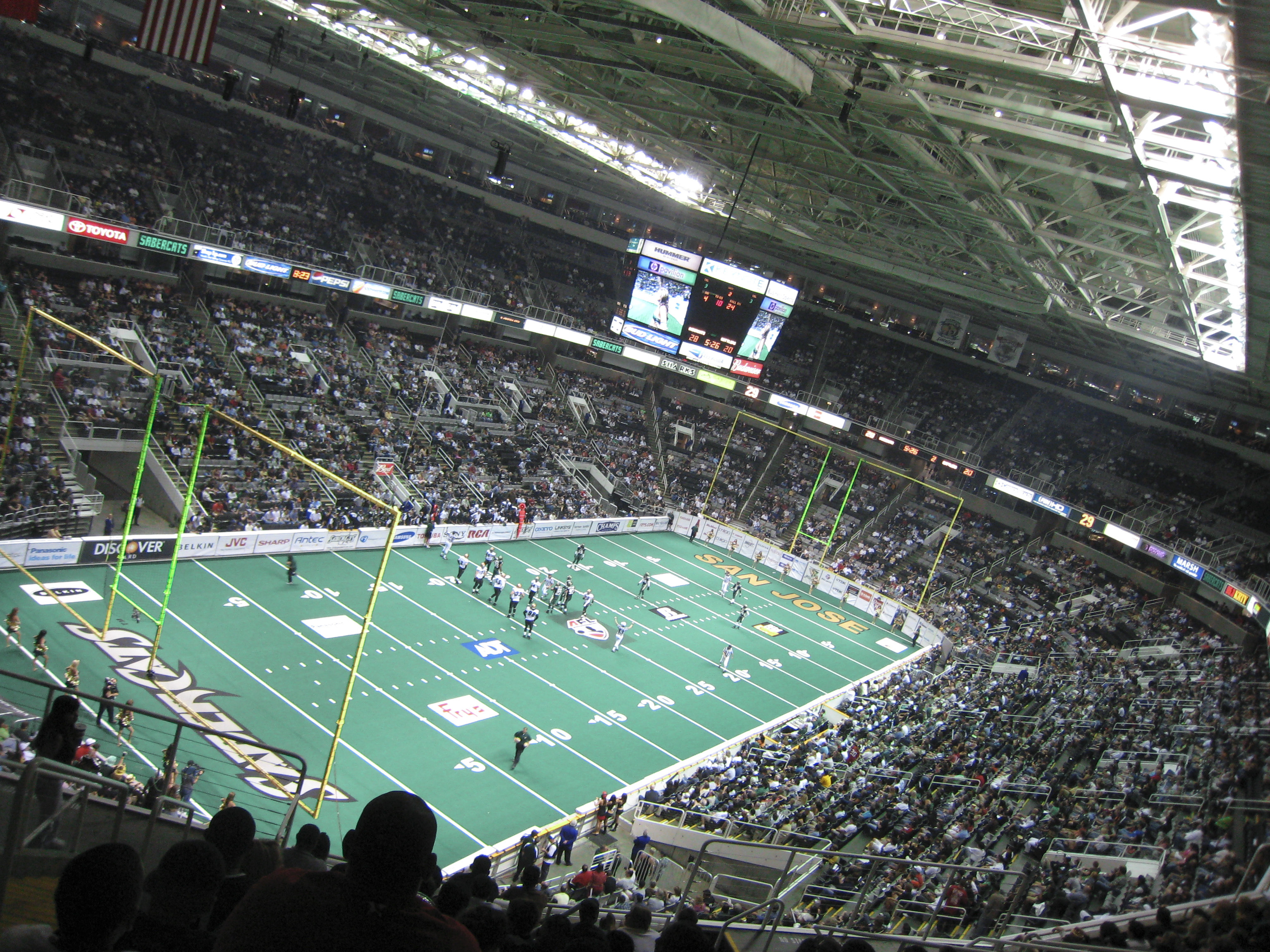
SaberCats in a 2007 game

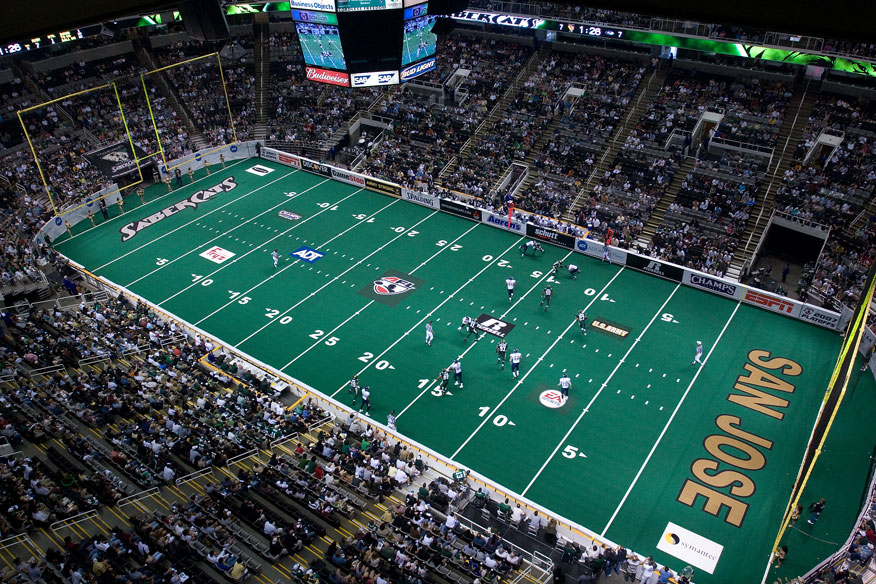
SaberCats in the 2007 American Conference Championship.

In 2007, they got revenge against the Rush in the American Conference championship and advanced to ArenaBowl XXI, where they beat the Columbus Destroyers in front of a sellout crowd in New Orleans Arena and claimed their third Arena Bowl title in six seasons.

=== AFL collapse and revival (2009–2010) ===
On August 4, 2009, the Arena Football League announced that it was "suspending operations indefinitely" but likely to fold. The SaberCats announced shortly afterward that they intend to field a team for 2010, even if it means moving to a new indoor football league.

When the formation of a new arena football league, Arena Football 1 (renamed the new Arena Football League), was announced in 2009, the SaberCats were not one of the initial 16 teams announced. Bossier-Shreveport Battle Wings owner Dan Newman mentioned that the SaberCats were one of at least two former AFL franchises with which negotiations were in progress, the other being the Tampa Bay Storm. However, when AF1 announced its schedule in January 2010, the SaberCats were not among the 15 teams listed. At the time, it was unclear whether they would join another league, or join the new AFL later.

They would be replaced by the smaller and lesser-known San Jose Wolves of the AIFA as they contemplate their future. The Wolves do not play at HP Pavilion as the SaberCats have, rather at the Cow Palace in Daly City.

On June 16, it was officially announced that the SaberCats would be returning in 2011 as a member of the Arena Football League. The ownership once again consists of major executives from national electronics chain Fry's Electronics (John Fry, William Randy Fry, David Fry, and Kathryn J. Kolder), and in addition maintained former SaberCats coach Darren Arbet.

=== 2011 season ===
The SaberCats opened their 2011 season with a 76–48 victory over the Spokane Shock. They went on to win against the Kansas City Command 60–57. The SaberCats lost the next two games, 54–41 against the Chicago Rush, and 76–69 against the Iowa Barnstormers. It looked like the 'Cats were going on a winning streak after they won the next three games (75–55 against the Utah Blaze, 42–33 against the Tulsa Talons, and 68–61 against the Philadelphia Soul), but after a bye week they went on a devastating seven game losing streak (65–43 against the Arizona Rattlers, 54–48 against the Pittsburgh Power, 76–68 against the Utah Blaze, 55–49 against the Georgia Force, 70–57 against the Dallas Vigilantes, 64–57 against the Arizona Rattlers, and 82–21 against the Cleveland Gladiators). This losing streak ended against the Jacksonville Sharks when they won 83–70. The SaberCats ended the season with a 7–11 record.

=== 2012 season ===
Unlike their disappointing 2011 campaign, the SaberCats were able to clinch a playoff spot as the #3 seed, finishing the regular season with a 12–6 record. However, they were defeated 48–51 by the Arizona Rattlers in the first round of the playoffs.

=== 2013 season ===
The SaberCats finished the regular season with a 13–5 record, earning the #4 seed in the National Conference. They lost the National Conference Semifinals to the Arizona Rattlers by a score of 59–49.

=== 2014 season ===
The SaberCats finished the regular season with a record of 13–5 for the second consecutive year, winning the Pacific Division and earning the #2 seed in the National Conference. They won the National Conference Semifinals against the Spokane Shock in a 55–28 contest but lost the Conference Championship to the Arizona Rattlers by a 72–56 score.

=== 2015 season ===
The SaberCats finished the regular season with a franchise best 17–1 record (their only loss was against the 4–14 L.A. Kiss), winning the Pacific Division and earning the #1 seed in the National Conference with homefield advantage throughout the playoffs. They won the National Conference Semifinals against the Portland Thunder by a score of 55–28 and then won the Conference Championship against the Arizona Rattlers in a 70–67 contest. They won ArenaBowl XXVIII against the Jacksonville Sharks, finishing the 2015 season with a combined 20–1 record and becoming the first team in league history to win twenty combined regular season and postseason games. However, due to scheduling conflicts at the SAP Center, the SaberCats were forced to play all but one playoff game–including the ArenaBowl–at Stockton Arena in Stockton, 80 miles (130 km) north of San Jose. The Frys lobbied to move the game from its original August 29 date to August 31 so it could be played in San Jose. However, the league refused, citing its contract with ESPN.

Surprisingly, after the 2015 season, the AFL announced that the SaberCats were ceasing operations for non-football related reasons. According to Metro Silicon Valley, the Frys were concerned about the rampant instability that had prevailed in the league since it returned to the field.

Controversy surrounded the closing of the franchise in 2015. The SaberCats' franchise never returned the Foster Trophy to the league, the award handed out to each Arena Bowl champion throughout the league's history. Also, the players of the Arena Bowl XXVIII never received championship rings, becoming the first team in league history to never receive rings for the accomplishment.

=== Season-by-season ===
ArenaBowl champions	ArenaBowl appearance	Division champions	Playoff berth

Season	League	Conference	Division	Regular season			Postseason results
Season	League	Conference	Division	Finish	Wins	Losses	Postseason results
San Jose SaberCats
1995	AFL	American	Western	1st	8	4	Lost Quarterfinals (Orlando) 55–37
1996	AFL	American	Western	3rd	6	8	
1997	AFL	American	Western	2nd	8	6	Lost Quarterfinals (Iowa) 68–59
1998	AFL	American	Western	2nd	7	7	Lost Quarterfinals (Tampa Bay) 65–46
1999	AFL	American	Western	3rd	6	8	
2000	AFL	American	Western	1st	12	2	Won Quarterfinals (Oklahoma) 63–40; Lost Semifinals (Nashville) 51–42
2001	AFL	American	Western	1st	10	4	Won Quarterfinals (Arizona) 68–49; Lost Semifinals (Nashville) 71–47
2002	AFL	American	Western	1st	13	1	Won Quarterfinals (Tampa Bay) 66–41; Won Semifinals (Orlando) 52–40; Won ArenaBowl XVI (Arizona) 52–14
2003	AFL	American	Western	1st	12	4	Won Quarterfinals (Georgia) 69–48; Lost Semifinals (Arizona) 66–49
2004	AFL	American	Western	2nd	11	5	Won Quarterfinals (Tampa Bay) 56–52; Won Semifinals (Chicago) 49–35; Won ArenaBowl XVIII (Arizona) 69–62
2005	AFL	American	Western	2nd	9	7	Lost Conference Semifinals (Colorado) 56–48
2006	AFL	American	Western	1st	10	6	Won Divisional Round (Arizona) 62–48; Lost Conference Championship (Chicago) 59–56
2007	AFL	American	Western	1st	13	3	Won Divisional Round (Colorado) 76–67; Won Conference Championship (Chicago) 61–49; Won ArenaBowl XXI (Columbus) 55–33
2008	AFL	American	Western	1st	11	5	Won Divisional Round (Colorado) 64–51; Won Conference Championship (Grand Rapids) 81–55; Lost ArenaBowl XXII (Philadelphia) 59–56
2009	The AFL suspended operations for the 2009 season.						
2010	Did not play in 2010.						
2011	AFL	National	West	4th	7	11	
2012	AFL	National	West	2nd	12	6	Lost Conference Semifinals (Arizona) 51–48
2013	AFL	National	West	3rd	13	5	Lost Conference Semifinals (Arizona) 59–49
2014	AFL	National	Pacific	1st	13	5	Won Conference Semifinals (Spokane) 55–28; Lost Conference Championship (Arizona) 72–56
2015	AFL	National	Pacific	1st	17	1	Won Conference Semifinals (Portland) 55–28; Won Conference Championship (Arizona) 70–67; Won ArenaBowl XXVIII (Jacksonville) 68–47
Total					198	98	(includes only regular season)
Total					19	12	(includes only the postseason)
Total					217	110	(includes both regular season and postseason)

== Rivals ==
The San Jose SaberCats had two primary rivals: Their divisional rival Spokane Shock, and their former division rival, the Arizona Rattlers. They also have rivalries with other teams that arose from playoff battles in the past, most notably with the Chicago Rush. The Los Angeles Avengers had an old rivalry with San Jose as well, but the rivalry became irrelevant when the Avengers became defunct in 2009.

=== Arizona Rattlers ===
The Rattlers and SaberCats were divisional rivals from 1995 to 2013, but the division alignment for 2014 put San Jose in the Pacific division and Arizona in the west. The SaberCats had a 7-game winning streak against the Rattlers from 2006 to 2008, lasted until May 7, 2011, when the Rattlers defeated the SaberCats 43–65. While the SaberCats still hold the advantage in the all-time series 26–22 (21–18 in the regular season and 5–4 in the playoffs), the Rattlers amassed 9 wins in 12 games, from the 1995 season before the arrival of SaberCats head coach Darren Arbet, through the 2000 season. On Saturday May 5, 2012 the SaberCats beat the Rattlers 77–70 (at US Airways Center), giving the SaberCats the most points scored in a game against the Rattlers in the team's history. The SaberCats' first ever ArenaBowl appearance (in the 2002 season) was a victory over the Rattlers.

=== Spokane Shock ===
The Shock and the SaberCats have been divisional rivals since the SaberCats re-joined the AFL in 2011. San Jose lost a Saturday June 23, 2012 game (63–90), and this game remains the highest ever point total scored against the SaberCats in franchise history. In 2011, the Shock won 63–61 on a last second Hail Mary from Kyle Rowley to Adron Tennell, clinching a playoff spot for the Shock and eliminating the SaberCats from playoff contention. San Jose led the overall series 5–4 when the Shock departed the AFL.

== Broadcasting ==
The SaberCats game had been broadcast on KNBR AM 1050 out of San Mateo. However, on May 15, 2015, the SaberCats announced that they would have their games broadcast live on KDOW AM 1220 radio in San Francisco. This was the first broadcast of sports of any kind for that station.

== Notable players ==
=== Retired numbers ===
San Jose SaberCats retired numbers
No.	Player	Position	Seasons	Ref.
2	Barry Wagner	WR/DB	2000–2006	
14	Omarr Smith	WR/DB	2000–2002; 2004–2008	
16	Mark Grieb	QB	1999–2012	
55	Sam Hernandez	OL/DL	1998–2005	

=== Arena Football Hall of Famers ===
San Jose SaberCats Hall of Famers
No.	Name	Year inducted	Position(s)	Years w/ SaberCats
–	Darren Arbet	2011	Head Coach	1999–2008; 2011–2015
5	Ben Bennett	2000	QB	1996
55	Sam Hernandez	2011	OL/DL	1998–2005
44	Bob McMillen	2013	FB/LB	2001–2002
14	Omarr Smith	2014	DB	2000–2002; 2004–2008
8	Clevan Thomas	2012	DB	2002–2008; 2013–2015
2	Barry Wagner	2011	WR/DB	2000–2006

=== Individual awards ===
AFL Offensive Player of the Year
Season	Player	Position
2002	Mark Grieb	QB

AFL Defensive Player of the Year
Season	Player	Position
2002	Clevan Thomas	DB
2003	Clevan Thomas	DB
2012	Joe Sykes	DL
2013	Clevan Thomas	DB
2014	Jason Stewart	DL

ArenaBowl MVP Winners
ArenaBowl	Player	Position
XVI	John Dutton	QB
XVIII	Mark Grieb	QB
XXI	Mark Grieb	QB
XXVIII	Reggie Gray	WR

AFL Rookie of the Year
Season	Player	Position
2002	Clevan Thomas	DB
2006	Ben Nelson	OS

Defensive back of the Year
Season	Player	Position
2003	Clevan Thomas	DB

Kicker Player of the Year
Season	Player	Position
2008	A. J. Haglund	K
2014	Nich Pertuit	K

Defensive lineman of the Year
Season	Player	Position
2012	Joe Sykes	DL

Lineman of the Year
Season	Player	Position
2000	Sam Hernandez	OL–DL

Don't Blink! Player of the Year
Season	Player	Position
1998	Steve Papin	WR–DB
1999	Steve Papin	WR–DB

Wide Receiver of the Year
Season	Player	Position
2015	Reggie Gray	WR

Offensive lineman of the Year
Season	Player	Position
2014	Rich Ranglin	OL

Al Lucas Hero Award
Season	Player	Position
2015	David Hyland	DB

=== All-Arena players ===
The following SaberCats players were named to All-Arena Teams:

- QB Mark Grieb (3), Erik Meyer (1)
- FB Brian Johnson (1), Chad Cook (1)
- FB/LB Keala Keanaaina (1)
- WR James Roe (1), Reggie Gray (1)
- WR/DB Barry Wagner (2)
- OL Mark Lewis (1), Rich Ranglin (4), Emmanuel Akah (1), George Bussey (1)
- DL Ron Jones (1), Joe Sykes (1), Jason Stewart (3)
- OL/DL Al Noga (1), Sam Hernandez (3), Joe Jacobs (1), Mike Ulufale (1)
- LB Steve Watson (1), Francis Maka (4), Huey Whittaker (1)
- DB Marquis Floyd (1), Clevan Thomas (1), Ken Fontenette (1)
- K A. J. Haglund (2), Nich Pertuit (2)
- OS Titus Dixon (1), Steve Papin (2), James Hundon (1), Ben Nelson (1)
- DS Patrick McGurik (2), Tommy Jones (1), Clevan Thomas (5), Omarr Smith (1)

=== All-Ironman players ===
The following SaberCats players were named to All-Ironman Teams:

- WR/DB Rashied Davis (1), James Roe (2)
- WR/LB Barry Wagner (2), James Roe (1), Jason Geathers (2)
- DS/KR Clevan Thomas (1)

=== All-Rookie players ===
The following SaberCats players were named to All-Rookie Teams:

- FB/LB James Williams
- WR/DB Shalon Baker
- OL/DL Mike Ulufale
- LB Steve Watson
- OS Ben Nelson
- DS Clevan Thomas
- K A. J. Haglund

== Head coaches ==
Name	Term	Regular season				Playoffs		Awards	Reference
Name	Term	W	L	T	Win%	W	L	Awards	Reference
Todd Shell	1995–1998	29	25	0	.537	0	3		
Darren Arbet	1999–2015	174	72	0	.707	19	8	Coach of the Year (2000, 2002 & 2015)	
