= Ed Hodgkiss =

American football player and coach (born 1970)

Personal information
- Born: October 23, 1970 (age 56); Laurel, Maryland, U.S.

Career information
- College: Fairmont State

Career history
- Albany/Indiana Firebirds (1999–2001) Offensive coordinator; Los Angeles Avengers (2002–2008) Head coach

Head coaching record
- Regular season: 57–53 (.518)
- Postseason: 1–5 (.167)
- Career: 55–58 (.487)

Ed Hodgkiss (born October 23, 1970) is an American former Arena Football League (AFL) coach for the Los Angeles Avengers.

In 2001, Hodgkiss was hired from the Albany/Indiana Firebirds, where he served as their Offensive coordinator, to become the head coach of the Avengers. In his first season as head coach, Hodgkiss led the Avengers to their first ever playoff berth. He was fired in June 2008.
