= Ben Nelson (American football) =

American football player (born 1979)

No. 80
- Position: Wide receiver

Personal information
- Born: August 21, 1979 (age 47); Coon Rapids, Minnesota, U.S.
- Listed height: 6 ft 2 in (1.88 m)
- Listed weight: 190 lb (86 kg)

Career information
- High school: Anoka (Anoka, Minnesota)
- College: St. Cloud State
- NFL draft: 2003: undrafted

Career history
- Minnesota Vikings (2003–2004); → Cologne Centurions (2004); San Jose SaberCats (2006–2007); Tampa Bay Buccaneers (2006)*; Atlanta Falcons (2007)*; Colorado Crush (2008); Sioux Falls Storm (2009); Cleveland Gladiators (2010); San Jose SaberCats (2011–2012, 2014–2015); Spokane Shock (2015); San Jose SaberCats (2015)
- * Offseason or practice squad member only

Awards and highlights
- 2× ArenaBowl champion (2007, 2015); First-team All-Arena (2010); AFL Rookie of the Year (2006)

Career NFL statistics
- Games played: 3
- Stats at Pro Football Reference

Career AFL statistics
- Receptions: 654
- Receiving yards: 8,271
- Receiving TDs: 178
- Tackles: 23
- Stats at ArenaFan.com

Benjamin Scott Nelson (born August 21, 1979) is an American former professional football player who was a wide receiver in the National Football League (NFL) and Arena Football League (AFL). He was signed by the Minnesota Vikings as an undrafted free agent in 2003 and played in three games on special teams. He played college football for the St. Cloud State Huskies.

Nelson was the AFL Rookie of the Year in 2006.

== Professional career ==
On June 1, 2015, the SaberCats placed Nelson on reassignment. On June 2, 2015, he was claimed by the Spokane Shock. On June 3, 2015, Nelson was placed on recallable reassignment. On June 19, 2015, Nelson was assigned to the San Jose SaberCats.
