= ArenaBowl XVI =

Annual league championship game

Arizona Rattlers (#2)	San Jose SaberCats (#1)
14	52
	1	2	3	4	Total
ARI	0	0	0	14	14
SJ	7	17	14	14	52
- Date: August 18, 2002
- Stadium: HP Pavilion at San Jose; San Jose, California
- MVP: John Dutton, QB, San Jose: Omarr Ali Hasan Smith, WR/DB, San Jose (Ironman of the Game)
- Attendance: 16,942
- Winning coach: Darren Arbet
- Losing coach: Danny White

TV in the United States
- Network: ABC
- Announcers: Tim Brant, Ed Cunningham, and Lynn Swann

ArenaBowl XVI was played between the San Jose SaberCats and Arizona Rattlers in San Jose, California on August 18, 2002. A game with considerable expectations given the teams' intense rivalry and respective success that year, the SaberCats surprised everyone by posting the most dominant victory in ArenaBowl history, holding the Rattlers scoreless until the final period, and winning the game by the lopsided score of 52–14 to earn their first Arena Football League title in franchise history. Arizona's 14 points are the second-lowest in ArenaBowl history, just above the Chicago Bruisers' 13 points in ArenaBowl II. With the SaberCats' victory, Darren Arbet also became the first African-American head coach to win a North American pro football championship.

== Game summary ==
For much of the 2002 season, the San Jose SaberCats were entertaining the possibility of an undefeated year, which would have been and would still remain a first for the Arena Football League. The SaberCats' roster included superstars such as Bob McMillen, Omarr Smith, Mark Grieb, Barry Wagner, Sam Hernandez, and rookie sensation Clevan Thomas; of those, only Grieb is not currently enshrined in the Arena Football League Hall of Fame. They defeated their Western Division rivals, the Arizona Rattlers, 52–51 in the season opener, and continued their success en route to a 12–0 start. However, their rematch with the Rattlers in Phoenix on July 12 cost them not only their undefeated record, but also starting quarterback Mark Grieb, who suffered a season-ending broken collarbone in the SaberCats' 59–52 loss. Though it would prove to be San Jose's only loss of the season, it set the stage for what figured to be an extremely competitive ArenaBowl championship game.

That was not the case, however, as coach Arbet's San Jose squad took a 24-point lead by halftime, and extended it to 45–0 early in the fourth quarter before Arizona finally scored on a touchdown pass from Sherdrick Bonner to Maurice Bryant with 9:24 remaining in the contest. Each team scored one more touchdown, and the SaberCats emerged with a 52–14 blowout victory.

Quarterback John Dutton, who replaced Grieb following the injury, continued to roll as he had throughout the playoffs, completing 20 of 26 passes for 236 yards and five touchdowns (three to James Hundon) and earning MVP honors. Wide receiver/defensive back Omarr Smith was named the Ironman of the Game, as he had four receptions and also led a San Jose defense that forced three Rattler turnovers. San Jose won the Foster Trophy for the first time in franchise history, while the loss would prove to be the first of three consecutive ArenaBowl failures for Arizona, though they would be significantly more competitive in their future championship game appearances.

== Scoring summary ==
1st Quarter

- SJ – Hundon 28 pass from Dutton (Alcorn kick)

2nd Quarter

- SJ – Hundon 2 pass from Dutton (Alcorn kick)
- SJ – FG Alcorn 31
- SJ – Wagner 2 run (Alcorn kick)

3rd Quarter

- SJ – Roe 12 pass from Dutton (Alcorn kick)
- SJ – Reese 32 pass from Dutton (Alcorn kick)

4th Quarter

- SJ – McMillen 1 run (Alcorn kick)
- AZ – Bryant 30 pass from Bonner (Cooper pass from Bonner)
- SJ – Hundon 2 pass from Dutton (Alcorn kick)
- AZ – Kelly 3 run (pass failed)
