= Los Angeles Avengers =

Arena football team

Logo

General information
- Founded: 2000
- Folded: 2009
- Headquartered: Staples Center in Los Angeles, California
- Colors: Red, blue, gold and white
- Mascot: TD

Personnel
- Owner: Casey Wasserman
- Head coach: Ed Hodgkiss
- President: Matt Wikstrom

Team history
- Los Angeles Avengers (2000–2008)

Home fields
- Staples Center (2000–2008)

League / conference affiliations
- Arena Football League (2000–2008): American Conference (2000–2008); Western (2000–2008)

Championships
- Division championships: 1: Western: 2005

Playoff appearances (5)
- 2002, 2003, 2004, 2005, 2007

The Los Angeles Avengers were an Arena Football League team based in Los Angeles, California, from 2000 through 2008. They folded on April 19, 2009.

== History ==
The Los Angeles Avengers played their home games at the Staples Center, which is also the current home to the Los Angeles Kings of the National Hockey League, the Los Angeles Lakers and Los Angeles Clippers of the National Basketball Association, the Los Angeles Sparks of the Women's National Basketball Association. The team began play in the 2000 season. The Avengers competed in the Western Division of the American Conference. Since its inception in 2000, the Avengers had competed in postseason play five times. The Avengers earned American Conference wildcard playoff berths in 2002, 2003, 2004, and 2007, and won the American Conference Western Division Championship in 2005.

The Avengers franchise was owned by Casey Wasserman, grandson of the MCA head Lew Wasserman.

As part of the Avengers's marketing plan as they got off the ground in 2000, the team placed risqué billboard slogans around Greater Los Angeles, with slogans including "On April 9th, Twelve Men Will Go Both Ways," meaning the members will play both offense and defense. One such sign, reading "Six Beautiful Women Will Show You Their Panties" (a joking reference to the team's cheerleaders) aroused the ire of Rick Cole, then City Manager of Azusa. He responded by borrowing a City truck and splashing paint over the sign, further publicizing the Avengers. Following Rick Cole's apology and compensation payments, the Los Angeles District Attorney's office chose not to file vandalism charges.

On April 10, 2005, in a game against the New York Dragons, offensive lineman/defensive tackle Al Lucas tackled Corey Johnson during a kickoff return with 10:17 to go in the first quarter. Replays showed that Johnson's knee hit Lucas' helmet, and Lucas did not move again after falling to the ground. Later replays and reports showed nothing abnormal on the play. Dr. William Lang, the team physician, attempted to revive him on the field. He appeared to suffer a spinal cord injury. After being treated for approximately a half an hour at the Staples Center, Lucas was rushed to nearby California Hospital Medical Center, where he was pronounced dead at 1:28pm PDT. He was only 26 years of age. It is unknown whether Lucas died on the field, or after treatment failed. An autopsy revealed that he died of blunt force trauma and an upper spinal cord injury. It is the only fatal injury incurred during a game in the history of the league. The Al Lucas Hero Award is named after him.

The Avengers announced the termination of the program on April 20, 2009, after nine years of operation. Four years later, it was announced that the Los Angeles KISS would join the AFL starting in the 2014 season making them the fourth team to set up shop in the Los Angeles area.

The Avengers' official mascot was a superhero-like character named T.D.

== Memorable Avengers' highlights ==
- On Sunday, March 30, 2003, in a Week 9 road game against the Orlando Predators, the Avengers trailed 63–58 late in the game. However, Los Angeles managed to recover an onside kick and, on the last play of the game, quarterback Tony Graziani threw a 32-yard touchdown pass that bounced off the rebound net and was caught by WR/LB Greg Hopkins, giving the Avengers a 64–63 win.
- On Sunday, March 31, 2004, In the championship series taking place at Staples Center, Los Angeles, Ca. #98 John Garcia not only led the team in sacks on this day with 3 also blocked and returned a FG to win the game against the Chicago Rush. Final Score 24–26. Quarterback Tony Graziani threw for only 1 Touchdown pass and 3 INT's.

== Season-by-season ==
ArenaBowl champions	ArenaBowl appearance	Division champions	Playoff berth

Season	League	Conference	Division	Regular season			Postseason results
Season	League	Conference	Division	Finish	Wins	Losses	Postseason results
2000	AFL	American	Western	4th	3	11	
2001	AFL	American	Western	3rd	5	9	
2002	AFL	American	Western	3rd	8	6	Lost Wild Card Round (Tampa Bay) 66–41
2003	AFL	American	Western	2nd	11	5	Lost Quarterfinals (Arizona) 70–63
2004	AFL	American	Western	3rd	9	7	Lost Quarterfinals (Arizona) 59–42
2005	AFL	American	Western	1st	10	6	Lost Conference Semifinals (Chicago) 52–45
2006	AFL	American	Western	5th	5	11	
2007	AFL	American	Western	2nd	9	7	Won Wild Card Round (Utah) 59–42; Lost Divisional Round (Chicago) 52–20
2008	AFL	American	Western	4th	5	11	
Total					65	73	(includes only regular season)
Total					1	5	(includes only the postseason)
Total					66	78	(includes both regular season and postseason)

== Coaches ==
Head coach	Tenure	Regular season record (W-L)	Post season record (W-L)	Most recent coaching staff	Notes
Stan Brock	2000 - 2001	3-14	0-0		Let go after starting 0-3 during 2001.
Robert Lyles	2001	5-6	0-0		Replaced Brock, was not retained after season.
Ed Hodgkiss	2002 - 2008	57-53	1-5		
Pat O'Hara*	2009	0-0	0-0	OC:Vacant; DC / DB coach: Maurice Blanding; QB / WR coach: Chad Salisbury; DL / LB coach: Leroy Thompson; OL / FB coach: Mark Tucker	Team folded before he coached a game.

== Notable players ==
=== Arena Football Hall of Famers ===
Los Angeles Avengers Hall of Famers
No.	Name	Year Inducted	Position(s)	Years w/ Avengers
82	Greg Hopkins	2013	WR/LB	2002–06

=== Individual awards ===
Rookie of the Year
Season	Player	Position
2000	Chris Jackson	OS

Ironman of the Year
Season	Player	Position
2002	Greg Hopkins	WR/LB
2005	Kevin Ingram	WR/DB

Offensive Player of the Year
Season	Player	Position
2003	Chris Jackson	OS

Defensive Player of the Year
Season	Player	Position
2005	Silas DeMary	DL

Lineman of the Year
Season	Player	Position
2005	Silas DeMary	DL

Kicker of the Year
Season	Player	Position
2005	Remy Hamilton	K
2006	Remy Hamilton	K

=== Retired uniform numbers ===
Los Angeles Avengers retired numbers
N°	Player	Position	Seasons	Ref.
76	Al Lucas	DL	2004−05	
82	Greg Hopkins	WR	2002-06	

=== All-Arena players ===
The following Avengers players were named to All-Arena Teams:

- QB Tony Graziani (1)
- FB/LB Elcardos Worthen (1)
- WR/DB Kevin Ingram (3)
- WR/LB Greg Hopkins (2)
- OL/DL Victor Hall (1), Silas DeMary (1)
- DL Silas DeMary (1)
- OS Chris Jackson (1)
- DS Mark Ricks (1)
- K Remy Hamilton (3)
- MLB John Cook Jr (2)

=== All-Ironman players ===
The following Avengers players were named to All-Ironman Teams:

- FB/LB Josh Jeffries (1)
- WR/DB Kevin Ingram (3)
- DB/RB Dave Dawson (1)
- WR/LB Chris Jackson (1), Greg Hopkins (2)
- OL/DL Victor Hall (1), Tony Plantin (1)

=== All-Rookie players ===
The following Avengers players were named to All-Rookie Teams:

- QB Todd Marinovich, Sonny Cumbie
- WR/LB Chris Jackson
- OL/DL Arnold Miller
- DS Damen Wheeler
- K Brian Reaves
