= 2007 Orlando Predators season =

Arena Football League team season

- Head coach: Jay Gruden
- Home stadium: Hummer Field at Amway Arena

Results
- Record: 8–8
- Division place: 3rd
- Playoffs: L 41–26 vs. Philadelphia
- Team DPY: Greg White

The 2007 Orlando Predators season was the 17th season for the franchise. They finished the season with an 8–8 record and lost in the first round of the playoffs to the Philadelphia Soul, 41–26.

== Schedule ==
Week	Date	Opponent	Home/Away Game	Result
1	March 2	Tampa Bay Storm	Away	W 52–27
2	March 12	Los Angeles Avengers	Home	L 44–37
3	March 16	Austin Wranglers	Home	W 45–30
4	March 26	Dallas Desperados	Home	L 70–49
5	March 31	New Orleans VooDoo	Away	L 48–45
6		Bye	Week	
7	April 14	Tampa Bay Storm	Home	W 61–37
8	April 20	New York Dragons	Home	W 52–47
9	April 29	Las Vegas Gladiators	Away	W 69–34
10	May 4	Georgia Force	Away	L 55–34
11	May 11	New Orleans VooDoo	Home	W 42–33
12	May 20	Austin Wranglers	Away	W 46–45
13	May 25	Utah Blaze	Home	L 65–62
14	June 1	San Jose SaberCats	Away	L 59–52
15	June 9	New York Dragons	Away	W 75–54
16	June 15	Georgia Force	Home	L 55–44
17	June 21	Philadelphia Soul	Away	L 63–49

== Playoff schedule ==
Round	Date	Opponent	Home/Away	Result
1	June 29	(4) Philadelphia Soul	Away	L 41–26

== Coaching ==
Jay Gruden started his fourth season as head coach of the Predators. He'd also coached for four years from 1998 to 2001.

== Personnel moves ==
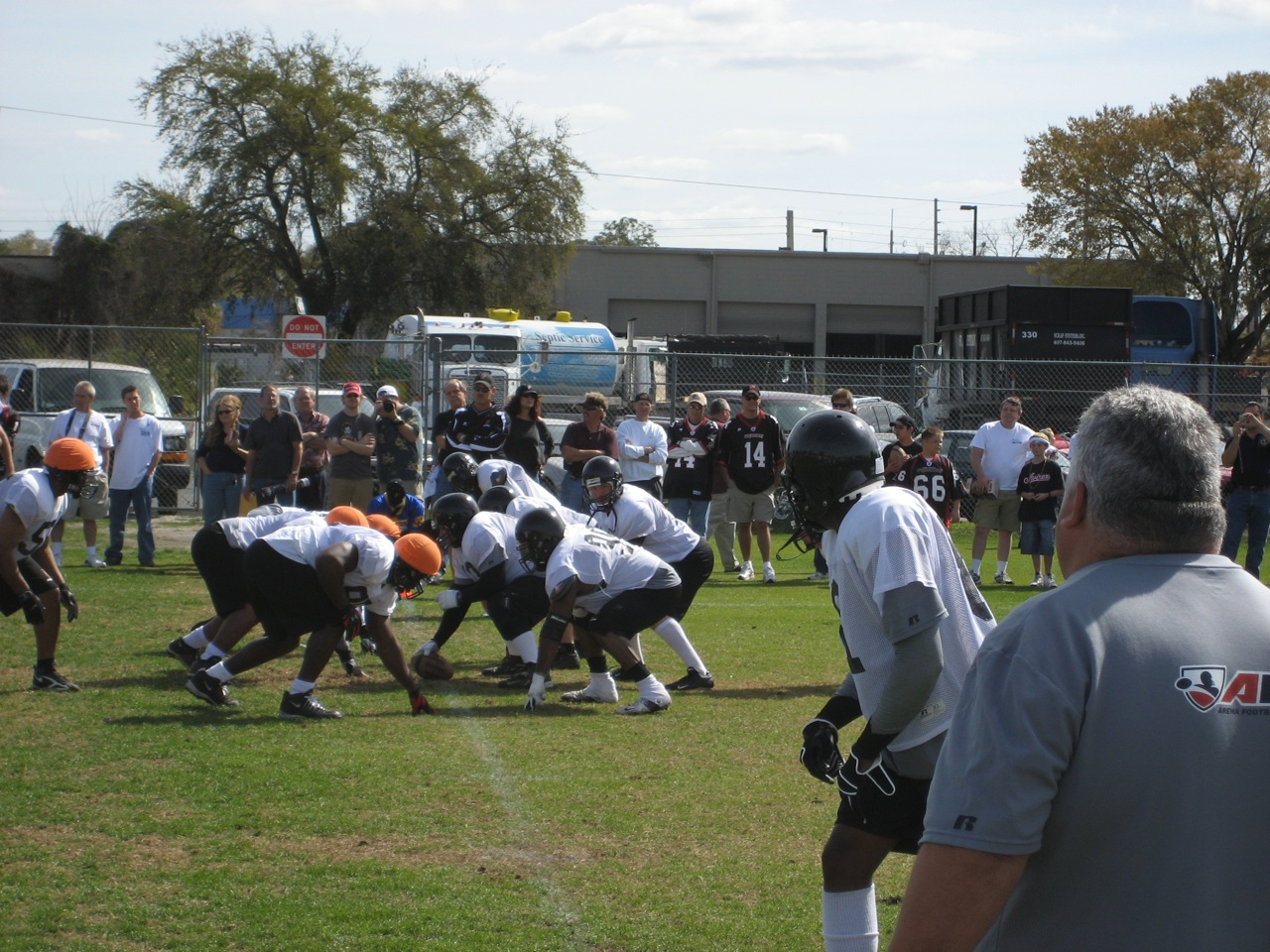
A Predators practice in February

=== Acquired ===
- Orlando signed Shane Stafford in the off-season
- On June 13, Orlando signed disgruntled wide receiver T.T. Toliver after he had been released by Tampa Bay

== Stats ==
=== Offense ===
==== Passing ====
Player	Comp.	Att.	Comp%	Yards	TD's	INT's	Long	Rating
Shane Stafford	369	573	64.4	4284	76	10	45	112.8

==== Rushing ====
Player	Car.	Yards	Avg.	TD's	Long
Kevin Nagle	48	155	3.2	4	20
Marlin Moye-Moore	44	69	1.6	15	16
Shane Stafford	19	30	1.6	4	6
T.T. Toliver	6	26	4.3	0	13
Javarus Dudley	16	20	1.3	4	5
Ryan Bowers	2	9	4.5	0	5

==== Receiving ====
Player	Rec.	Yards	Avg.	TD's	Long
Javarus Dudley	107	1524	14.2	29	43
Ron Johnson	69	733	10.6	12	38
Jimmy Fryzel	55	581	10.6	8	31
DeAndrew Rubin	25	315	12.6	7	42
Cliff Dell	15	193	12.9	4	45
T.T. Toliver	20	191	9.5	--	--
J.R. Russell	16	136	8.5	2	12
Charles Lee	10	113	11.3	1	34
Levon Thomas	12	110	9.2	3	20
Kevin Nagle	11	105	9.5	1	20
Ryan Bowers	2	26	13	0	17
Charles Hill	3	25	8.3	2	11
Marlon Moye-Moore	1	5	5	0	5

==== Touchdowns ====
Player	TD's	Rush	Rec	Ret	Pts
Javarus Dudley	33	4	29	0	198
Marlon Moye-Moore	15	15	0	0	102
Ron Johnson	13	0	12	1	78
Jimmy Fryzel	8	0	8	0	48
DeAndrew Rubin	7	0	7	0	42
Kevin Nagle	5	4	1	0	36
T.T. Toliver	5	0	4	1	30
Cliff Dell	4	0	4	0	24
Shane Stafford	4	4	0	0	24

=== Defense ===
Player	Tackles	Solo	Assisted	Sack	Solo	Assisted	INT	Yards	TD's	Long
Lin-J Shell	110.5	105	11	0	0	0	4	0	0	0
Rayshun Reed	72	65	14	0	0	0	6	32	0	20
Marlon Moye-Moore	70	62	16	0	0	0	3	11	0	9
Ryan Bowers	62	60	4	0	0	0	5	32	1	20
Micheaux Robinson	38	35	6	0	0	0	0	0	0	0
Greg White*	33.5	28	11	15	14	2	0	0	0	0
Lance Mitchell	18.5	15	7	2	2	0	0	0	0	0
Kevin Nagle	15	13	4	1	1	0	0	0	0	0
Floyd Young	13	12	2	0	0	0	0	0	0	0
Charles Hill	8.5	5	7	0	0	0	0	0	0	0
Ron Johnson	8	6	4	0	0	0	0	0	0	0
JoJo Polk	7.5	6	3	0	0	0	1	35	0	35
Doug Miller	6.5	4	5	.5	0	0	0	0	0	0
Barry Wagner	6.5	6	1	0	0	0	0	0	0	0
Darrell Wright	6.5	5	3	1.5	1	1	0	0	0	0
Chaz Murphy	5.5	4	3	3	3	0	1	4	0	4
Bernard Holsey	3	1	4	1.5	0	3	0	0	0	0
Levon Thomas	3	2	2	0	0	0	0	0	0	0
Jay Taylor	2.5	2	1	0	0	0	0	0	0	0
Cliff Dell	2	2	0	0	0	0	0	0	0	0
Javarus Dudley	2	2	0	0	0	0	0	0	0	0
Jimmy Fryzel	2	2	0	0	0	0	0	0	0	0
Reggie Lee	2	1	2	0	0	0	0	0	0	0
Greg Jefferson	1.5	1	1	0	0	0	0	0	0	0
Justin Cleveland	1	1	0	0	0	0	0	0	0	0
Johnny Miller	1	1	0	0	0	0	0	0	0	0
Shane Stafford	1	1	0	0	0	0	0	0	0	0
Delanio Taylor	1	1	0	0	0	0	0	0	0	0

*Lineman of the year

=== Special teams ===
==== Kick return ====
Player	Ret	Yards	TD's	Long	Avg	Ret	Yards	TD's	Long	Avg
DeAndrew Rubin	15	282	0	38	18.8	2	33	0	26	16.5
T.T. Toliver	12	230	1	–	–	–	–	–	–	–
Ryan Bowers	17	256	0	34	15.1	2	16	0	9	8
Javarus Dudley	17	249	0	33	14.6	1	0	0	0	0
Micheaux Robinson	14	206	0	32	14.7	0	0	0	0	0
Jimmy Fryzel	6	104	0	21	17.3	1	15	0	15	15
Ron Johnson	2	50	1	42	25	0	0	0	0	0
Cliff Dell	2	20	0	19	10	0	0	0	0	0
Barry Wagner	1	12	0	12	12	0	0	0	0	0
J-Lin Shell	2	0	0	0	0	0	0	0	0	0

==== Kicking ====
Player	Extra pt.	Extra pt. Att.	FG	FGA	Long	Pct.	Pts
Jay Taylor	101	109	11	21	45	0.524	134

== Playoff Stats ==
=== Offense ===
==== Passing ====
Player	Comp.	Att.	Comp%	Yards	TD's	INT's	Long
Shane Stafford	16	38	42	226	2	1	49

==== Rushing ====
Player	Car.	Yards	Avg.	TD's	Long
Shane Stafford	2	0	0	0	0
T.T. Toliver	1	−1	−1	0	--
Marlon Moye-Moore	1	−2	−2	0	--

==== Receiving ====
Player	Rec.	Yards	Avg.	TD's	Long
Jimmy Fryzel	8	103	12.9	0	35
Ron Johnson	7	107	15.3	1	49
Javarus Dudley	1	7	17	1	17

=== Special teams ===
==== Kick return ====
Player	Ret	Yards	Long	Avg
T.T. Toliver	5	68	13.6	16

==== Kicking ====
Player	Extra pt.	Extra pt. Att.	FG	FGA	Long	Pts
Jay Taylor	2	2	4	4	34	14

== Regular season ==
=== Week 1: at Tampa Bay Storm ===
	1	2	3	4	Total
ORL	21	7	7	17	52
TB	6	6	9	6	27

Scoring Summary:

1st Quarter:

- ORL- DeAndrew Rubin 34 YD pass from Shane Stafford (Jay Taylor kick) – 7–0 ORL
- ORL- DeAndrew Rubin 42 YD pass from Shane Stafford (Jay Taylor kick) – 14–0 ORL
- ORL- Jimmy Fryzel 19 YD pass from Shane Stafford (Jay Taylor kick) – 21–0 ORL
- TB- T.T. Toliver 27 YD pass from John Kaleo (PAT failed) – 21–6 ORL

2nd Quarter:

- TB- Rodney Filer 1 YD Run (PAT failed) – 21–12 ORL
- ORL- Javarus Dudley 1 YD Run (Jay Taylor kick) – 28–12 ORL

3rd Quarter:

- TB- Bill Gramatica 37 YD FG – 28–15 ORL
- ORL- DeAndrew Rubin 28 YD pass from Shane Stafford (Jay Taylor kick) – 35–15 ORL
- TB- Demetris Bendross 39 YD pass from John Kaleo (PAT failed) – 35–21 ORL

4th Quarter:

- ORL- Jay Taylor 20 YD – 38–21 ORL
- TB- Demetris Bendross 18 YD pass from John Kaleo (PAT failed) – 38–27 ORL
- ORL- Shane Stafford 3 YD Run (Jay Taylor kick) – 45–27 ORL
- ORL- Javarus Dudley 37 YD pass from Shane Stafford (Jay Taylor kick) – 52–27 ORL

Attendance: 15,619

=== Week 2: vs Los Angeles Avengers ===
	1	2	3	4	OT	Tot
LA	10	7	5	14	7	44
ORL	3	7	7	20	0	38

Scoring Summary:

1st Quarter:

2nd Quarter:

3rd Quarter:

4th Quarter:

=== Week 3: vs Austin Wranglers ===
	1	2	3	4	Total
AUS	7	13	0	10	30
ORL	14	7	7	17	45

Scoring Summary:

1st Quarter:

2nd Quarter:

3rd Quarter:

4th Quarter:

=== Week 4: vs Dallas Desperados ===
	1	2	3	4	Total
DAL	14	21	14	21	70
ORL	14	21	7	7	49

Scoring Summary:

1st Quarter:

2nd Quarter:

3rd Quarter:

4th Quarter:

=== Week 5: at New Orleans VooDoo ===
	1	2	3	4	Total
ORL	26	0	7	12	45
NO	21	0	6	21	48

Scoring Summary:

1st Quarter:

2nd Quarter:

3rd Quarter:

4th Quarter:

=== Week 7: vs Tampa Bay Storm ===
	1	2	3	4	Total
TAM	3	6	14	14	37
ORL	0	35	19	7	61

Scoring Summary:

1st Quarter:

2nd Quarter:

3rd Quarter:

4th Quarter:

=== Week 8: vs New York Dragons ===
	1	2	3	4	Total
NYD	14	6	14	13	47
ORL	14	10	21	7	52

Scoring Summary:

1st Quarter:

2nd Quarter:

3rd Quarter:

4th Quarter:

=== Week 9: at Las Vegas Gladiators ===
	1	2	3	4	Total
ORL	14	20	21	14	69
LV	0	0	13	21	34

Scoring Summary:

1st Quarter:

2nd Quarter:

3rd Quarter:

4th Quarter:

=== Week 10: at Georgia Force ===
	1	2	3	4	Total
ORL	6	14	14	0	34
GEO	14	21	7	13	55

Scoring Summary:

1st Quarter:

2nd Quarter:

3rd Quarter:

4th Quarter:

=== Week 11: vs New Orleans VooDoo ===
	1	2	3	4	Total
NO	3	16	0	14	33
ORL	7	14	7	14	42

Scoring Summary:

1st Quarter:

2nd Quarter:

3rd Quarter:

4th Quarter:

=== Week 12: at Austin Wranglers ===
	1	2	3	4	Total
ORL	10	10	7	19	46
AUS	7	21	14	3	45

Scoring Summary:

1st Quarter:

2nd Quarter:

3rd Quarter:

4th Quarter:

=== Week 13: vs Utah Blaze ===
	1	2	3	4	Total
UTA	14	21	7	23	65
ORL	14	21	7	20	62

Scoring Summary:

1st Quarter:

2nd Quarter:

3rd Quarter:

4th Quarter:

=== Week 14: at San Jose SaberCats ===
	1	2	3	4	Total
ORL	14	10	14	14	52
SJ	7	17	14	21	59

Scoring Summary:

1st Quarter:

2nd Quarter:

3rd Quarter:

4th Quarter:

=== Week 15: at New York Dragons ===
	1	2	3	4	Total
ORL	21	21	6	27	75
NYD	12	7	13	22	54

Scoring Summary:

1st Quarter:

2nd Quarter:

3rd Quarter:

4th Quarter:

=== Week 16: vs Georgia Force ===
	1	2	3	4	Total
GEO	13	21	7	14	55
ORL	7	24	0	13	44

Scoring Summary:

1st Quarter:

2nd Quarter:

3rd Quarter:

4th Quarter:

=== Week 17: at Philadelphia Soul ===
	1	2	3	4	Total
ORL	21	14	7	7	49
PHI	14	21	14	14	63

Scoring Summary:

1st Quarter:

2nd Quarter:

3rd Quarter:

4th Quarter:

== Playoffs ==
=== Week 1: vs (4) Philadelphia Soul ===
	1	2	3	4	Total
(5) ORL	7	13	3	3	26
(4) PHI	10	10	14	7	41

Scoring Summary:

1st Quarter:

2nd Quarter:

3rd Quarter:

4th Quarter:
