= Shane Stafford =

American football player and coach (born 1976)

No. 14
- Position: Quarterback

Personal information
- Born: March 14, 1976 (age 50); Sinking Spring, Pennsylvania, U.S.
- Listed height: 6 ft 3 in (1.91 m)
- Listed weight: 220 lb (100 kg)

Career information
- High school: Wilson (West Lawn, Pennsylvania)
- College: Connecticut
- NFL draft: 1999: undrafted

Career history

Playing
- Tallahassee Thunder (2000); Tampa Bay Storm (2001–2002); Cleveland Browns (2002)*; New England Patriots (2003)*; → Scottish Claymores (2003); Tampa Bay Buccaneers (2003)*; Tampa Bay Storm (2004–2006); Orlando Predators (2007–2008); Dallas Vigilantes (2010)
- * Offseason or practice squad member only

Coaching
- Tampa Bay Storm (2016–2017) Offensive assistant coach; Washington Valor (2018) Offensive assistant coach; Atlantic City Blackjacks (2019) Offensive coordinator

Awards and highlights
- ArenaBowl champion (2018); 2× Al Lucas Hero Team (2007, 2008)

Career AFL statistics
- Comp. / Att.: 2,113 / 3,293
- Passing yards: 24,525
- TD–INT: 451–79
- QB rating: 110.83
- Rushing TD: 35
- Stats at ArenaFan.com

Shane Stafford (born March 14, 1976) is an American former professional football quarterback and coach. He was signed by the Tallahassee Thunder as a street free agent in 2000. He played college football at Connecticut.

Prior to signing with Orlando, he played with the Tampa Bay Storm for five seasons. Stafford holds Storm single-season records for completions (408), passing yards (4,793) and touchdown passes (86) and career marks for completions (1,357), passing yards (15,667) and touchdown passes (289). Stafford also played for the Tallahassee Thunder of af2, and the Scottish Claymores in NFL Europe. He was the offensive coordinator for the Atlantic City Blackjacks of the Arena Football League (AFL) in 2019.

== Early life ==
Stafford attended Wilson High School in West Lawn, Pennsylvania, where he starred in both football and basketball. In 2005, he was inducted into the Wilson High School Athletic Hall of Fame.

== College career ==
At the University of Connecticut, Stafford finished his college career as the second in career passing yards (8,975), attempts (1,026), completions (563) and total offense (8,829) in school history. He is also tied as the school's all-time touchdown passing leader with 73, had a passer rating of 143.4 which is the best in school history.

== Professional career ==
Stafford signed as a street free agent with the Tallahassee Thunder of the afl2 for the 2000 season. Stafford led the af2 with 85 touchdown passes, although the Thunder finished in last place in the af2's National Conference with a record of 5–11.

== AFL statistics ==
Legend
	Led the league
**Bold**	Career high

Year	Team	Passing							Rushing		
Year	Team	Cmp	Att	Pct	Yds	TD	Int	Rtg	Att	Yds	TD
2001	Tampa Bay	63	98	64.3	770	14	2	115.60	5	8	1
2002	Tampa Bay	203	323	62.8	2,164	39	7	103.53	18	18	2
2004	Tampa Bay	282	442	63.8	3,421	67	13	113.14	20	36	5
2005	Tampa Bay	405	634	63.9	4,522	83	14	108.56	29	30	**10**
2006	Tampa Bay	**408**	**650**	62.8	**4,795**	**86**	**18**	106.67	**32**	**57**	**10**
2007	Orlando	368	571	64.4	4,317	76	10	113.27	18	30	4
2008	Orlando	353	528	**66.9**	4,162	81	15	**117.16**	24	31	3
2010	Dallas	31	47	66.0	374	5	0	116.80	4	-25	0
Career		2,113	3,293	64.2	24,525	451	79	110.83	150	185	35
