= Augusta Mavericks =

- Founded: 2010
- League: Southern Indoor Football League
- Team history: Augusta Mavericks (2010–present)
- Based in: Augusta, Georgia
- Arena: James Brown Arena
- Colors: Gold, Sky Blue, Black, White
- President: Progressive Sports and Entertainment Group, LLC
- Head coach: TBD
- Championships: 0

The Augusta Mavericks were to be an indoor football team which will begin Southern Indoor Football League play in 2011. Based in Augusta, Georgia, their home games will be played at the James Brown Arena.

The Mavericks are the third indoor/arena team to play in Augusta, following the af2's Augusta Stallions (2000–2002) and the Augusta Colts (known as the Spartans in 2006–2007) which played in the American Indoor Football Association and the World Indoor Football League from 2006 until suspending operations indefinitely in 2008.
