= 2007 World Indoor Football League season =

The 2007 World Indoor Football League season would turn out to be the only season of the World Indoor Football League (WIFL). The league champions were the Augusta Spartans, who defeated the Columbus Lions in World Indoor Bowl I.

== Standings ==
Team	Wins	Losses	Percentage
Columbus Lions	10	4	0.714
Augusta Spartans	8	6	0.571
Osceola Ghostriders	6	8	0.429
Daytona Beach Thunder	4	10	0.286

- Grey indicates clinched best regular-season record
- Green indicates clinched playoff berth

== Playoffs ==
=== Opening round ===
Opening Round
3	Osceola	19
2	Augusta	25

=== World Indoor Bowl I ===
World Indoor Bowl I
2	Augusta	63
1	Columbus	60
