= Rick Hamilton =

American football player (born 1970)

No. 56, 53, 42
- Position: Linebacker

Personal information
- Born: April 19, 1970 (age 56); Inverness, Florida, U.S.
- Listed height: 6 ft 2 in (1.88 m)
- Listed weight: 241 lb (109 kg)

Career information
- High school: Citrus (Inverness)
- College: UCF
- NFL draft: 1993: 3rd round, 71st overall pick

Career history
- Washington Redskins (1993–1994); Kansas City Chiefs (1994–1995); Barcelona Dragons (1996); New York Jets (1996); Detroit Lions (1997)*; Orlando Predators (1998–2003); Los Angeles Avengers (2003)
- * Offseason or practice squad member only

Awards and highlights
- 2× ArenaBowl champion (1998, 2000); ArenaBowl MVP (1998); Second-team All-Arena (2000); AFL All-Rookie Team (1998); UCF Athletics Hall of Fame (2006)

Career NFL statistics
- Tackles: 68
- Sacks: 1.5
- Fumble recoveries: 2
- Stats at Pro Football Reference

Career AFL statistics
- Tackles: 82
- Sacks: 3
- Fumble recoveries: 3
- Rushing yards: 727
- Rushing touchdowns: 26
- Stats at ArenaFan.com

Richard R. Hamilton (born April 19, 1970) is an American former professional football player who was a linebacker in the National Football League (NFL) for the Washington Redskins, the Kansas City Chiefs, and the New York Jets. He played college football for the UCF Knights. He was selected in the third round of the 1993 NFL draft by Washington with the 71st overall pick. He also played for the Orlando Predators and Los Angeles Avengers of the Arena Football League (AFL).
