= Pat O'Hara =

American football player and coach (born 1968)

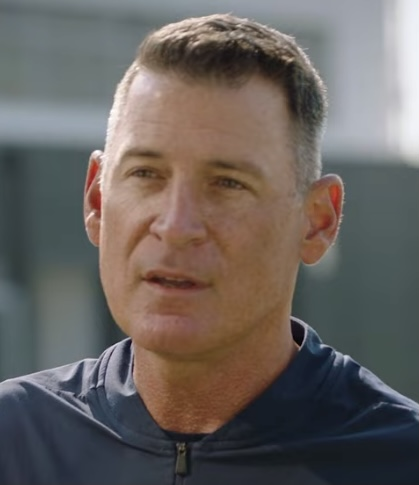
- O'Hara in 2021

Profile
- Position: Quarterback

Personal information
- Born: September 27, 1968 (age 58); Los Angeles, California, U.S.
- Listed height: 6 ft 4 in (1.93 m)
- Listed weight: 215 lb (98 kg)

Career information
- High school: Santa Monica (Santa Monica, California)
- College: USC
- NFL draft: 1991: 10th round, 260th overall pick

Career history

Playing
- Tampa Bay Buccaneers (1991); Ohio Glory (1992); San Diego Chargers (1992); Washington Redskins (1994)*; Orlando Predators (1995–2000); Toronto Phantoms (2001–2002); Tampa Bay Storm (2003–2006)
- * Offseason or practice squad member only

Coaching
- Point Loma High School (1996) Quarterbacks coach; New Smyrna Beach High School (1998–2000) Quarterbacks coach; Olympia High School (2001–2003) Offensive coordinator; Tampa Bay Storm (2005) Offensive coordinator; Tampa Bay Storm (2007–2008) Offensive coordinator; Tri-Cities Fever (2009) Head coach; Orlando Predators (2010–2011) Head coach; New Orleans VooDoo (2012–2014) Head coach; Houston Texans (2015–2017) Offensive assistant; Tennessee Titans (2018–2022) Quarterbacks coach; Tennessee Titans (2023) Pass game analyst

Operations
- Jacksonville Sharks (2014) Director of player personnel

Awards and highlights
- 3× ArenaBowl champion (1998, 2000, 2003)

Career AFL statistics
- Comp–Att: 988–1,752
- Comp %: 56.4
- TD–INT: 231–65
- Passing yards: 13,383
- Passer rating: 98.41
- Stats at ArenaFan.com

Head coaching record
- Regular season: AFL: 35–53 (.398)
- Postseason: AFL: 1–3 (.250)
- Career: AFL: 36–56 (.391)

Patrick O'Hara (born September 27, 1968) is an American football coach and former quarterback. He previously served as the head coach of the New Orleans VooDoo, Orlando Predators and Tri-Cities Fever. O'Hara also served as an assistant coach for the Houston Texans, Tampa Bay Storm, and Tennessee Titans.

O'Hara played college football as a quarterback for the USC Trojans and was selected by the Tampa Bay Buccaneers in the 10th round (260th overall) of the 1991 NFL draft.

In his 16-year playing career, O'Hara has also played for the Ohio Glory, San Diego Chargers, Washington Redskins, Orlando Predators, Toronto Phantoms and Tampa Bay Storm, and played backup quarterback Tyler Cherubini in Oliver Stone's 1999 film Any Given Sunday. Over the span of his AFL career, O'Hara played in five ArenaBowls, winning three. In 2005, he was named offensive coordinator of the Storm, in the unique position as a player-coach. Then, in 2007, after retiring as a player, O'Hara resumed the duties of offensive coordinator. After the 2008 season, he agreed to a three-year deal, with an option for a fourth, with the Los Angeles Avengers to become the fourth head coach in franchise history. However, the Avengers folded when the AFL went on hiatus.

== Early life ==
O'Hara attended Santa Monica High School, where he threw at least one touchdown a game as a junior and senior. O'Hara was a two-time Los Angeles Times All-Westside selection and the "Westside Back of the Year" in 1984 and 1985.

As a junior in 1984, O'Hara passed for nearly 2,000 yards and 23 touchdowns. The following year, he passed for nearly 2,000 yards and 21 touchdowns in 10 games, which earned O'Hara "Bay League Player of the Year" honors and selection to the Long Beach Press-Telegram's "Best in the West" team. In 1986, O'Hara was also an All-Bay League centerfielder for the Vikings baseball team.

== College career ==
O'Hara attended USC where his playing time was limited to being a backup. As a sophomore in 1988, O'Hara served as the backup to Rodney Peete, who finished the season as a Heisman Trophy finalist.

O'Hara was expected to be the Trojans' starting quarterback in 1989, but suffered two torn ligaments in his right knee and a fractured right tibia in practice 10 days before the season began. The injuries required multiple surgeries, including one to graft bone from his hip. O'Hara was hospitalized for three weeks, a time in which he lost 35 pounds (16 kg) and received a get-well letter from former president Ronald Reagan.

As a senior in 1990, O'Hara served as backup to Todd Marinovich. Marinovich, then a freshman, was given the starting job and helped lead the team to a Rose Bowl win against Michigan in Bo Schembechler's last game as a head coach. O'Hara's arm was impressive enough for some NFL scouts to offer him a workout with them. O'Hara graduated with a degree in Public Administration in 1991.

== Professional playing career ==
=== National Football League ===
O'Hara was selected in the 10th round (260th overall) of the 1991 NFL draft by the Tampa Bay Buccaneers. He spent the first 11 weeks on the teams practice squad before being activated and serving as the team third-string quarterback the remainder of the season. O'Hara holds the unique distinction as the only quarterback selected in modern draft history without ever being a starter in a collegiate game.

Following the 1991 season, O'Hara was allocated to the World League of American Football's Ohio Glory and subsequently signed by the San Diego Chargers as a Plan B free agent serving as their third-string quarterback for the 1992 season. He attended training camp with the Chargers in 1993 and the Washington Redskins in 1994.

=== Arena Football League ===
O'Hara transitioned to the Arena Football League in 1995 season when he signed with the Orlando Predators. O'Hara played there for six seasons helping to lead the Predators to wins in ArenaBowls XII and XIV. He then joined the Toronto Phantoms in 2001 and then the Tampa Bay Storm in 2003. O'Hara helped lead the Storm to a win in ArenaBowl XVII after starting quarterback John Kaleo was injured late in the second quarter. In his playing career, O'Hara played in a total of five ArenaBowls and won three.

== Coaching career ==
O’Hara began his coaching career at Point Loma High School in 1996, working with the Quarterbacks as a volunteer assistant. He later spent three seasons (1998–2000) as an assistant coach at New Smyrna Beach High School and three seasons (2001–03) as the offensive coordinator at Olympia High School where he coached NFL running back Chris Johnson.

In 2005, O'Hara was named offensive coordinator of the Storm, in the unique position of a player-coach. After the 2006 season, he retired as a player, he resumed the duties of offensive coordinator. O'Hara's success on the field as a player and as a coordinator had a number of teams interested in him in the 2008 offseason. O'Hara interviewed for head coaching positions with the Grand Rapids Rampage and the Arizona Rattlers and was a finalist for both jobs. However, on July 25, 2008, he agreed to a three-year deal, with an option for a fourth, with the Los Angeles Avengers to become the fourth head coach in the franchise's history. However, the AFL cancelled its 2009 season, and on April 27, 2009, O'Hara was hired as the replacement of Richard Davis as head coach of the Tri-Cities Fever of af2.

The Fever went 3–8 after hiring O'Hara, finishing 3–13. Although the team invited him to remain on as head coach in 2010, O'Hara decided to take an offer to become head coach of the Orlando Predators in the Arena Football League on December 21, 2009.

On August 8, 2011, O'Hara was named the head coach of the New Orleans VooDoo. Following the 2015 AFL season, the VooDoo ceased operations.

On February 3, 2015, O'Hara was named an offensive assistant coach for the Houston Texans.

On January 26, 2018, O'Hara was hired as the quarterbacks coach for the Tennessee Titans.

== Broadcasting career ==
O'Hara worked as a television football analyst for Bright House (Spectrum) Sports Network covering Florida high school football from 2010 to 2014. He also served as color analyst for UCF Img Radio Network covering UCF football from 2013 to 2014. More recently, O'Hara has worked as a color analyst for CBS Sports Network covering the Arena Football League (AFL).

== Movie career ==
O’Hara's previous off-seasons have included consulting work, coordinating and choreographing football action scenes in movies. He also has coached actors such as Adam Sandler, Mark Wahlberg, Dwayne Johnson, Glen Powell and Sam Corlett to better help them portray their characters. O'Hara has appeared in several movies including The Waterboy, Any Given Sunday, and The Game Plan.

Year	Film	Type	Role	Notes
2027	Landman	Crew	Football coordinator	TV Series (Season 3)
2027	The Land	Crew	Football coach	TV Series (Also served as "Rams Coach")
2025	Chad Powers	Crew	Football administrator	TV series (Season 1)
2025	Ransom Canyon	Crew	Football coordinator	TV series (1 episode)
2024	All American	Crew	Football consultant	TV series (2 episodes)
2024	American Sports Story	Crew	Football consultant	TV series (1 episode)
TBA	One Heart	Crew	Football coordinator	Post production
2016	Love Is All You Need?	Crew	Football coordinator	
2015	Focus	Actor	Owner	Also served as football coordinator
2015	The Wedding Ringer	Stunts	Stuntman for Joe Namath	
2012	Red Dawn	Crew	Assistant football coach	
2011	Necessary Roughness	Crew	Football consultant	TV series (1 episode)
2010	When in Rome	Crew	Football consultant	
2009	Glee	Crew	Football consultant	TV series (1 episode)
2008	Pride and Glory	Crew	Football consultant	
2007	The Game Plan	Crew	Football coach	Credited as Pat O'Hara
2006	We Are Marshall	Crew	Football consultant	
2006	Invincible	Crew	Assistant football coach	Credited as Pat O'Hara
2006	The Shaggy Dog	Crew	Football consultant	
2005	The Longest Yard	Crew	Assistant football coordinator	Credited as Patrick J. O'Hara
1999	Any Given Sunday	Actor	Tyler Cherubini	
1998	The Waterboy	Actor	Cougar Quarterback	
