= Webbie Burnett =

American football player (born 1967)

No. 97, 78
- Positions: Offensive lineman, defensive lineman

Personal information
- Born: November 7, 1967 (age 58); Pensacola, Florida, U.S.
- Listed height: 6 ft 1 in (1.85 m)
- Listed weight: 285 lb (129 kg)

Career information
- High school: Pensacola
- College: Western Kentucky
- NFL draft: 1990: 11th round, 287th overall pick

Career history
- New Orleans Saints (1990)*; Raleigh-Durham Skyhawks (1991); Orlando Predators (1992–2000); Toronto Phantoms (2001)
- * Offseason or practice squad member only

Awards and highlights
- 2× ArenaBowl champion (1998, 2000); First-team All-Arena (1994); First-team Arena Football League 15th Anniversary Team (2001)
- Stats at ArenaFan.com

Webbie Dimitrius Burnett Jr. (born November 7, 1967) is an American former professional football lineman who played ten seasons in the Arena Football League (AFL) with the Orlando Predators and Toronto Phantoms. He was selected by the New Orleans Saints in the eleventh round of the 1990 NFL draft. He played college football at the University of Florida and Western Kentucky University.

== Early life ==
Webbie Dimitrius Burnett Jr. was born on November 7, 1967, in Pensacola, Florida. He played high school football at Pensacola High School. He earned Class 3A All-Area honors as both a junior and senior from 1983 to 1984.

== College career ==
Burnett accepted a full scholarship to play college football for the Florida Gators of the University of Florida. He was a backup with the Gators and was later declared academically ineligible.

Burnett transferred to play for the Western Kentucky Hilltoppers of Western Kentucky University. He had to sit out his junior year in 1988 due to NCAA transfer rules. He was then a letterman in 1989.

== Professional career ==
Burnett was selected by the New Orleans Saints in the eleventh round, with the 287th overall pick, of the 1990 NFL draft. He was released on August 27, 1990.

Burnett played in four games for the Raleigh-Durham Skyhawks of the World League of American Football in 1991 and posted 11 tackles.

Burnett played in 107 games for the Orlando Predators of the Arena Football League (AFL) from 1992 to 2000. He was an offensive lineman/defensive lineman during his time in the AFL as the league played under ironman rules. He was named first-team All-Arena in 1994. Burnett helped the Predators win ArenaBowl XII in 1998 and ArenaBowl XIV in 2000. In July 2000, Predators head coach Jay Gruden stated "When he came into the league he was a terrible center and a great defensive lineman. Now he's a great center and a suspect defensive lineman. But he's a great guy to have around, and as long as we can keep his minutes down, he can be effective."

Burnett finished his career by playing in eight games for the Toronto Phantoms of the AFL in 2001. He recorded AFL career totals of 79 solo tackles, 31 assisted tackles, 11.5 sacks, five forced fumbles, nine fumble recoveries, 12 pass breakups, and two blocked kicks. In 2001, he was one of three lineman to earn first-team recognition on the AFL's 15th Anniversary Team.

== Coaching career ==
Burnett began his coaching career in 2002 as the line coach for the Macon Knights of the af2. He was later the head coach of the Fayetteville Guard of the American Indoor Football Association (AIF).
