= War on I-4 (arena football) =

Orlando Predators–Tampa Bay Storm
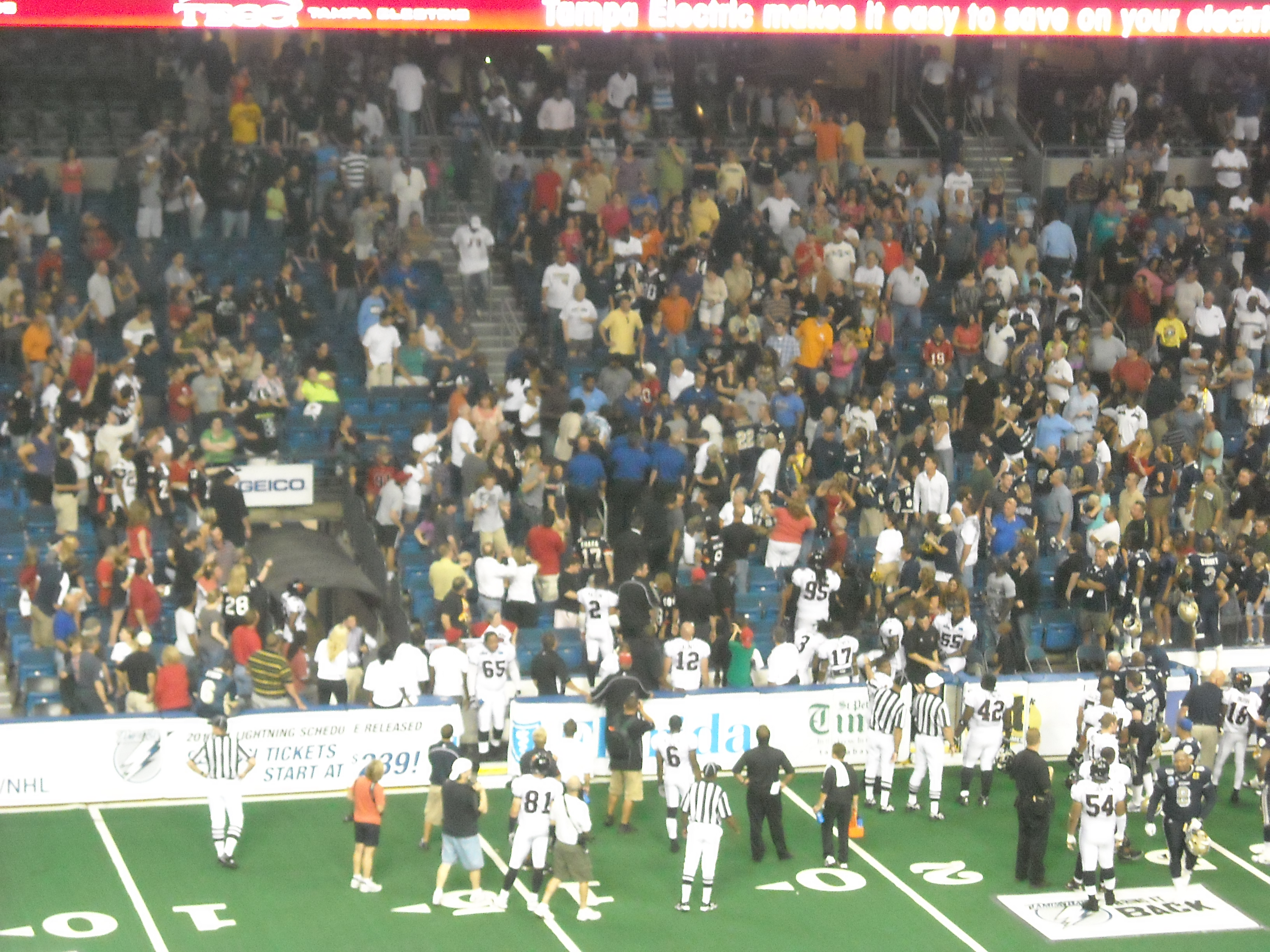
- In Tampa, during the final week of the 2010 regular season, two Orlando players entered the stands and fought with fans just before halftime.
- First meeting: June 1, 1991; Predators 51, Storm 38
- Latest meeting: June 24, 2016; Predators 56, Storm 33

Statistics
- Total meetings: 61
- All-time series: Predators, 34–27
- Regular season series: Predators, 30–23
- Postseason results: Tied, 4–4
- Largest victory: Predators, 76–25 (2016)
- Smallest victory: Predators, 44–43 (2000); Storm 63–62, (2010); Storm 35–34, (2014); Predators, 63–62 (2015)
- Longest win streak: Predators, 6 (2015–2016)

Playoff and Championship Success
- ArenaBowl Championships (7): TB (5) – 1991, 1993, 1995, 1996, 2003; ORL (2) – 1998, 2000; ArenaBowl Appearances (14): TB (7) – 1991, 1993, 1995, 1996, 1998, 2003, 2010; ORL (7) – 1992, 1994, 1995, 1998, 1999, 2000, 2006

The War on I–4 was a rivalry between the Tampa Bay Storm and the Orlando Predators in the Arena Football League. The teams met at least twice and up to four times a season starting in 1991, and both were consistently at the top of the league standings. The rivalry has been compared to the Yankees – Red Sox rivalry in Major League Baseball.

Although the Tampa Bay and Orlando markets, separated by an 80-mile stretch of Interstate 4, have teams in each of the major professional sports leagues of the United States and Canada, none of the Big Five leagues had a team in both cities. Orlando has the Magic of the NBA and Orlando City SC of MLS while Tampa Bay hosts the Rays in MLB, Buccaneers in the NFL and Lightning in the NHL. Despite each market being of relatively large size in its own respective right, few leagues (especially those that have had long histories) have attempted to place teams in both cities; this has created few opportunities for the two nearby cities to form rivalries. The Arena Football League was an aberration in this regard when it approved the Orlando Predators as an expansion team in 1991, then allowed for the Pittsburgh Gladiators, a charter AFL team, to relocate to the Tampa Bay area and become the Tampa Bay Storm. The Storm and Predators became instant rivals.

The games were played either at the teams' respective home arenas. At the time the series ended, these arenas were Amway Center for Orlando and Amalie Arena (previously known as the "Ice Palace", "St. Pete Times Forum", and "Tampa Bay Times Forum") for Tampa Bay. Games hosted by the Storm before the 1997 season were held at what is now Tropicana Field, but was known as "Florida Suncoast Dome" before 1994 and "Thunderdome" thereafter. Games hosted by the Predators until the end of the 2010 season were at Hummer Field at the Amway Arena (originally the "Orlando Arena", later "TD Waterhouse Centre"). For the 2014 season, the Predators played at CFE Arena on the campus of the University of Central Florida.

The Predators led the overall series 34–27 in regular season and playoff games combined. The sides met eight times in the AFL playoffs, with each team winning four times, twice being in the ArenaBowl, with each team winning once. Their final playoff meeting was on August 14, 2010 in the American Conference Championship game, in which Tampa Bay won 63–62 as a long field goal attempt by the Predators fell short as time expired.

The games between the teams were notable for featuring some of the highest attendances in AFL history. The ArenaBowl IX title match of September 1, 1995 drew an Arena Bowl record crowd of 25,087 to Thunderdome to see the Storm defeat the Predators by 48–35. Both teams were known to organize bus trips for supporters down Interstate 4 (hence the War on I-4) to the other city to see their squad play.

The series also had the top overall attendance record in league history when Orlando defeated Tampa Bay 46–45 in front of 28,745 at the Florida Suncoast Dome in week 6 of the 1993 AFL season.

In 2010, the rivalry resumed after a year off caused by the Arena Football League suspending operations in 2009. The rivalry ended when Orlando announced they would suspend operations following the conclusion of the 2016 season. Tampa Bay did the same following the 2017 season. The Predators were relaunched as an expansion team in the National Arena League prior to the 2019 season. The Arena Football League ceased operations after filing for

Shortly after the Predators withdrew from the AFL, the University of South Florida, based in Tampa, and the University of Central Florida, based in Orlando, claimed the "War on I-4" name for their own sports rivalries.

== Game-by-game results ==
Orlando victories	Tampa Bay victories

No.	Date	Location	Winning team		Losing team		Attendance
1	June 1, 1991	Florida Suncoast Dome	Orlando	51	Tampa Bay	38	10,354
2	July 27, 1991	Orlando Arena	Tampa Bay	26	Orlando	16	13,680
3	May 29, 1992	Orlando Arena	Tampa Bay	39	Orlando	32	11,312
4	July 2, 1992	Florida Suncoast Dome	Orlando	48	Tampa Bay	33	20,091
5	August 15, 1992*	Orlando Arena	Orlando	24	Tampa Bay	21^{OT}	13,680
6	May 21, 1993	Orlando Arena	Orlando	46	Tampa Bay	34	13,680
7	June 19, 1993	Florida Suncoast Dome	Orlando	46	Tampa Bay	45	28,745
8	August 14, 1993*	Orlando Arena	Tampa Bay	55	Orlando	52	13,680
9	July 1, 1994	Orlando Arena	Orlando	61	Tampa Bay	40	14,015
10	August 13, 1994	ThunderDome	Tampa Bay	40	Orlando	39	20,819
11	July 14, 1995	Orlando Arena	Tampa Bay	51	Orlando	34	15,638
12	July 29, 1995	ThunderDome	Tampa Bay	44	Orlando	20	24,055
13	September 1, 1995	ThunderDome	Tampa Bay	48	Orlando	35	25,087
14	May 18, 1996	ThunderDome	Tampa Bay	63	Orlando	42	16,444
15	July 19, 1996	Orlando Arena	Orlando	40	Tampa Bay	39	16,236
16	May 17, 1997	Ice Palace	Orlando	43	Tampa Bay	17	14,179
17	June 27, 1997	Orlando Arena	Orlando	54	Tampa Bay	30	16,529
18	June 12, 1998	Orlando Arena	Tampa Bay	42	Orlando	34	15,948
19	June 27, 1998	Ice Palace	Tampa Bay	56	Orlando	30	14,125
20	August 23, 1998	Ice Palace	Orlando	62	Tampa Bay	31	17,222
21	June 12, 1999	Orlando Arena	Tampa Bay	63	Orlando	37	15,101
22	July 11, 1999	Ice Palace	Tampa Bay	47	Orlando	28	11,777
23	August 7, 1999*	Ice Palace	Orlando	41	Tampa Bay	19	10,706
24	May 12, 2000	TD Waterhouse Centre	Orlando	44	Tampa Bay	43	13,342
25	July 1, 2000	Ice Palace	Tampa Bay	50	Orlando	36	14,047
26	August 3, 2000*	TD Waterhouse Centre	Orlando	34	Tampa Bay	24	13,122
27	June 10, 2001	TD Waterhouse Centre	Orlando	57	Tampa Bay	45	13,691
28	July 1, 2001	Ice Palace	Orlando	46	Tampa Bay	38	17,634
29	June 9, 2002	TD Waterhouse Centre	Tampa Bay	48	Orlando	45	12,855
30	July 7, 2002	Ice Palace	Orlando	55	Tampa Bay	48	11,784
31	February 9, 2003	TD Waterhouse Centre	Orlando	54	Tampa Bay	51	13,541
32	March 16, 2003	St. Pete Times Forum	Tampa Bay	52	Orlando	32	15,054
33	June 7, 2003*	St. Pete Times Forum	Tampa Bay	60	Orlando	50	14,028
34	February 8, 2004	St. Pete Times Forum	Tampa Bay	52	Orlando	41	15,404
35	May 2, 2004	TD Waterhouse Centre	Tampa Bay	63	Orlando	58	13,714
36	February 11, 2005	TD Waterhouse Centre	Orlando	61	Tampa Bay	46	14,478
37	April 9, 2005	St. Pete Times Forum	Tampa Bay	54	Orlando	42	18,794
38	February 19, 2006	St. Pete Times Forum	Orlando	67	Tampa Bay	64^{OT}	14,692
39	April 22, 2006	TD Waterhouse Centre	Orlando	52	Tampa Bay	13	15,920
40	March 2, 2007	St. Pete Times Forum	Orlando	52	Tampa Bay	27	15,619
41	April 14, 2007	Amway Arena	Orlando	61	Tampa Bay	37	15,303
42	April 26, 2008	Amway Arena	Tampa Bay	48	Orlando	41	13,365
43	June 7, 2008	St. Pete Times Forum	Tampa Bay	71	Orlando	61	17,344
44	May 28, 2010	Amway Arena	Tampa Bay	62	Orlando	50	10,924
45	July 31, 2010	St. Pete Times Forum	Orlando	75	Tampa Bay	60	17,302
46	August 14, 2010*	St. Pete Times Forum	Tampa Bay	63	Orlando	62	10,104
47	May 6, 2011	Amway Center	Orlando	63	Tampa Bay	61	12,897
48	June 17, 2011	St. Pete Times Forum	Tampa Bay	46	Orlando	44	11,151
49	May 5, 2012	Tampa Bay Times Forum	Tampa Bay	55	Orlando	31	8,488
50	June 15, 2012	Amway Center	Orlando	64	Tampa Bay	40	12,441
51	April 20, 2013	Amway Center	Tampa Bay	53	Orlando	35	11,969
52	June 8, 2013	Tampa Bay Times Forum	Orlando	55	Tampa Bay	48	14,041
53	March 29, 2014	Tampa Bay Times Forum	Orlando	56	Tampa Bay	52	10,896
54	April 19, 2014	CFE Arena	Orlando	77	Tampa Bay	65	5,434
55	June 21, 2014	Tampa Bay Times Forum	Tampa Bay	35	Orlando	34	11,890
56	May 16, 2015	Amway Center	Orlando	63	Tampa Bay	62^{OT}	10,973
57	July 11, 2015	Amalie Arena	Orlando	69	Tampa Bay	62	15,835
58	August 8, 2015	Amway Center	Orlando	59	Tampa Bay	40	15,188
59	April 1, 2016	Amalie Arena	Orlando	76	Tampa Bay	25	9,928
60	May 13, 2016	Amway Center	Orlando	42	Tampa Bay	40	12,971
61	June 24, 2016	Amway Center	Orlando	56	Tampa Bay	33	13,527
Series: Orlando leads 34–27
* Playoff Game
