= Daytona Beach ThunderBirds =

American indoor football team

Logo

General information
- Founded: 2005
- Folded: 2009
- Headquartered: Ocean Center in Daytona Beach, Florida
- Colors: Light blue, red, white

Team history
- Daytona Beach Hawgs (2005); Daytona Beach Thunder (2006–2007); Daytona Beach ThunderBirds (2008)

Home fields
- Ocean Center (2005–2008)

League / conference affiliations
- National Indoor Football League (2005) American Indoor Football League (2006): Southern Conference (2006); World Indoor Football League (2007); AF2 (2008): American Conference (2008); South Division (2008)

The Daytona Beach ThunderBirds were an arena football team based in Daytona Beach, Florida. They were founded in 2005 as the Daytona Beach Hawgs playing in the National Indoor Football League. In 2006, they changed their name to the Daytona Thunder and played in three different indoor football leagues over three seasons: the American Indoor Football League in 2006, the World Indoor Football League in 2007, and the AF2, the Arena Football League's developmental league, in 2008 (when their name was changed to the ThunderBirds). They folded after the 2008 season. The Marquee player for the Thurnderbirds was 6'3" 230 pound Left handed Quarterback Matt Bohnet, an Eastern Michigan Graduate, who completed 160 out of 307 passes for 1,890 Yards 28 Touchdowns and 17 interceptions.

== History ==
=== NIFL ===
The team began play in 2005 as the Daytona Beach Hawgs. They had a rollercoaster season. But it was a successful season with a record of 8–6, with most of the wins coming at home, including wins over Rome and losses to teams like Miami. The Hawgs shutout the New Jersey Xtreme, 54–0. The Hawgs would have qualified for a playoff spot, but were suspended for rules violations.

=== AIFL ===
In February 2006, the franchise left the NIFL over the suspension from the playoffs and later joined the American Indoor Football League, under coach Ervin Bryson and owners Kevin and Zack McDonald, and Jay Burton as the Daytona Beach Thunder . The team made some pre-season headlines when former Pittsburgh Steelers quarterback and FOX broadcaster Terry Bradshaw signed an actual players contract in a "blatant publicity stunt" at a Daytona Beach speaking engagement. Bradshaw, citing back problems, never played.

The team also garnered attention for its unique logo and its 45-foot sleeper bus that transported the team to its away games and delivered relief supplies to New Orleans following Hurricane Katrina. A partnership with the local PBS station produced a 30-minute show that aired weekly during the season.

On Friday, March 24, 2006, after losing their first three games, the Thunder got their first-ever win 49–24 against the Augusta Spartans on the road. The team put itself in position for a playoff berth at 5–4, but a three-game losing streak all but denied the Thunder the post-season. The team finished its inaugural season with a 6–8 record, with six losses coming at a combined margin of 19 points.

On Monday, June 12, 2006, the Thunder parted ways with Bryson. After an extensive search, the Thunder named former CFL Rookie of The Year, FSU Seminole, New York Giant and Tampa Bay Buc Leon Bright as Head Coach/Director Of Football Operations.

=== WIFL ===
The team later decided to join the newly formed World Indoor Football League for the 2007 season as a charter member, joining their former AIFL rival, the Augusta Spartans and two other teams.

Tragedy struck the team on February 26, 2007, when defensive back Javan Camon was killed after a hard but clean hit during a game with the Columbus Lions. The player, once a captain at the University of South Florida, likely broke his neck in the hit.

Major arena news hit Daytona Beach with the word that Barry Wagner (former Orlando Predators & San Jose SaberCats WR/DB) would be joining the team after getting cut from the Tampa Bay Storm at the beginning of the 2007 AFL season.

The Thunder finished at 4–10, last in the league, and was the only team out of the four in the league not to qualify for the postseason.

On September 19, 2007, Daytona Beach announced they were leaving the WIFL in hopes of joining AF2 for either the 2008 or 2009 season. The WIFL ceased operations soon afterwards.

=== af2 ===
On November 20, 2007, the team announced they had successfully joined the AF2, and would begin play there for the 2008 season. They changed their name to the ThunderBirds so as not to conflict with their fellow AF2 franchise the Mahoning Valley Thunder; they were the second team to bear that name in Daytona Beach football history; an outdoor team played in the Southern Professional Football League from 1962 to 1964 under the same name. According to AF2 website the Thunderbirds have folded as they are not on the team list.

== Season-by-season ==
Season records
Season	W	L	T	Finish	Playoff results
Daytona Beach Hawgs (NIFL)
2005	8	6	0	3rd Southern	--
Daytona Beach Thunder (AIFL)
2006	6	8	0	5th Southern	--
Daytona Beach Thunder (WIFL)
2007	4	10	0	4th League	--
Daytona Beach ThunderBirds (af2)
2008	2	14	0	4th AC South	--
Totals	12	32	0		

== Retired numbers ==
- 12 – Javan Camon
