= Al Lucas Award =

The Al Lucas Award was an award given to the Arena Football League Player of the Year by the Maxwell Football Club. The award is named for Al Lucas, who died in an AFL game in 2005.

== Previous winners ==
Year	Player	Team
2004	Mark Grieb	San Jose SaberCats
2005	Damian Harrell	Colorado Crush
2006	Clint Dolezel	Dallas Desperados
2007	Greg White	Orlando Predators
