= David Cool =

American football player (born 1969)

No. 3, 23, 4
- Position: Placekicker

Personal information
- Born: May 23, 1969 (age 57); Savannah, Georgia, U.S.
- Listed height: 6 ft 0 in (1.83 m)
- Listed weight: 190 lb (86 kg)

Career information
- High school: Stone Mountain (Stone Mountain, Georgia)
- College: Georgia Southern (1988–1991)
- NFL draft: 1992: undrafted

Career history
- New York Giants (1992)*; Amsterdam Admirals (1998)*; Orlando Predators (1998–2002); Chicago Rush (2002); Tampa Bay Storm (2003)
- * Offseason or practice squad member only

Awards and highlights
- 2× ArenaBowl champion (1998, 2000); First-team AFL 15th Anniversary Team (2001); 2× NCAA Division I-AA national champion (1989, 1990)
- Stats at ArenaFan.com

David Cool (born May 23, 1969) is an American former professional football placekicker who played in the Arena Football League.

Cool played college football for the Georgia Southern Eagles. He kicked two field goals in the 1988 NCAA Division I-AA Football Championship Game, which the Eagles lost to the Furman Paladins.

Cool was the placekicker for the Orlando Predators from 1998 to 2002, before finishing his career with the Chicago Rush and Tampa Bay Storm in 2003. Cool is likely best remembered for his game-winning field goal in ArenaBowl XIV in August 2000.
