= Reginald Lee (disambiguation) =

Reginald Lee was a lookout on the Titanic.

Reginald Lee may also refer to:

- Reggie Lee (actor) (born 1975), American actor
- Reggie Lee (American football) (born 1973), Arena Football League player
