= Jimmy Fryzel =

American football player (born 1981)

Profile
- Position: Offensive Specialist

Personal information
- Born: April 21, 1981 (age 45); Youngstown, Ohio
- Listed height: 5 ft 11 in (1.80 m)
- Listed weight: 180 lb (82 kg)

Career information
- College: UCF

Career history
- 2003: Miami Dolphins
- 2003: Atlanta Falcons
- 2003: Tennessee Titans
- 2003-2004: Chicago Bears
- 2005–2007: Orlando Predators

Awards and highlights
- 1× MAC Offensive Player-of-the-Week; 2× AFL Offensive Player-of-the-Game; Second-Team All-Mid-American Conference; 5th in career receiving yards (2,267), 7th career receiving touchdowns (41) and 10th in career scoring (246) with Orlando Predators

James David Fryzel (born April 21, 1981) is an American former Arena Football League wide receiver for the Orlando Predators. The Predators cut Fryzel prior to the 2008 season after he tore his ACL. Previous to signing with Orlando, he played wide receiver with the Miami Dolphins, the Atlanta Falcons, the Tennessee Titans, and the Chicago Bears.

== Early life ==
Fryzel was born in Youngstown, Ohio. He attended Lakeland High School in Lakeland, Florida, where he was active on the student council, National Honor Society, and Fellowship of Christian Athletes,. He was an All-County selection as a junior and senior in football. Fryzel lettered in track and soccer and was elected junior class president.

== Career ==
=== College ===
From 1999 to 2002, Fryzel played 43 games for the UCF Knights, including starting 23 games in his final two seasons. After establishing career-highs with 58 catches for 1,126 yards and 5 touchdowns, Fryzel obtained Second-Team All-Mid-American Conference Honors as a senior. He also earned a MAC Offensive Player-of-the-Week award for his game against Miami University, in which he caught 6 passes for 174 yards and 2 touchdowns. He finished his collegiate career with 137 receptions for 2,469 yards and 10 touchdowns. Then following his senior year, he played in the Rotary Gridiron Classic All-Star Game. Fryzel earned a bachelor's degree in accounting.

=== NFL career ===
After college, Fryzel began his pro career by signing with the Miami Dolphins as an undrafted free agent in May 2003. Later in 2003, he spent time on the practice squad of the Atlanta Falcons, the Tennessee Titans, and the Chicago Bears. In 2004, he attended the Chicago Bears training camp, but was waived during pre-season, then finally signed in October 2004 but soon sent back down to the taxi squad.

=== AFL career ===
On October 14, 2005, Fryzel signed on with the Orlando Predators to a one-year contract. Fryzel compiled big numbers in his first season with the Predators, despite having missed the first four games on the inactive list. Nevertheless, Fryzel led the Predators in receiving yards (1,159), finishing second in receptions (78), as well as second in receiving touchdowns (18). Fryzel also ended the season ranked second on team in both scoring (108 points) and all-purpose yards (1,356). He picked up an Offensive Player-of-the-Game award in his first game for his efforts, which included nine passes for 133 yards and 3 touchdowns versus the Chicago Rush. Fryzel might have complied four touchdowns in that game, but his last was called back when officials ruled the back of his head hit the line in the back-of-end zone on a spectacular leaping catch. After four consecutive 100-yard games, Fryzel earned his second Offensive Player-of-the-Game after his fifth consecutive 100-yard game against arch-rival, Tampa Bay Storm. In which he compiled 10 receptions for a career-high 159 yards and 3 touchdowns. He tied the club record for five consecutive games with at least 100-yards in receiving, but left early in the 3rd quarter with fractured ribs in a game versus Georgia. He missed two games because of the injury, but returned in the regular season finale, posting 170 receiving yards and 12 receptions, both of which were career highs. Fryzel posted 12 receptions for 128 yards and 3 touchdowns in a pair of playoff games, but his season was cut short after a semi-final loss to the Georgia Force. He re-signed with Orlando to another one-year deal in July 2005.

==== 2006 season ====
Fryzel led the Orlando Predators in receptions (87), receiving yards (1,108) and receiving touchdowns (23) for the 2006 season. He also led club in scoring with 138 total points. Fryzel caught 3 touchdown passes in a single game three times in his first three games. Then in Week 4 against the Tampa Bay Storm, Fryzel compiled 11 receptions for 158 yards and 3 touchdowns. But after Week 4, Fryzel was placed on Injured Reserve after being diagnosed with diabetes. Upon his return, he posted four, 100-yard receiving games during the final games of the regular season. He then caught 18 balls for 222 yards and 4 touchdowns in the post-season, including a game-high 10 receptions against the Chicago Rush in ArenaBowl XX, which the Predators came up short in defeating. Fryzel signed a one-year contract in July, allowing himself to continue to post big numbers with Orlando for the 2007 season.

==== 2007 season ====
In his first week against the Storm, Fryzel led team in receptions, grabbing 10 receptions for 107 yards and one score, in which his play was slightly hampered with a hamstring injury. Jimmy started in the second game, but reinjured his hamstring and his play-time was severely limited. From Week 3 to Week 9, he was sitting on the Injured Reserve list, but he returned in Week 10, catching five passes for 36 yards and one score. The old Fryzel returned the next week versus the New Orleans VooDoo, grabbing nine balls for 105 yards and one touchdown, in which he completed two key grabs on third down to keep the drives alive. In Week 12, Fryzel posted his third 100-yard game of the 2007 season, even completing his second score on the final play of game, producing winning points in a 46-45 come-from-behind win versus Austin. Then in the final game of the Predators 2007 season, he was limited to 39 yards on four catches, but he did manage a key eight-yard touchdown reception on third down at beginning of fourth quarter. In that game, Fryzel experienced his first taste of defense in the AFL, playing safety in the final seconds of the game against New York. Fryzel was also active in Predators off-season community service program, making multiple appearances in schools and charity functions on behalf of the Predators.

==== 2008 season ====
Fryzel tore his ACL prior to the 2008 AFL season. The Orlando Predators then released Fryzel. The current AFL Collective Bargaining Agreement states a team must place a player on IR (injured reserve) if he has been with the team for four seasons. Fryzel had played only three. So, despite being a league-leading receiver, and a fan favorite, the Predators cut him. The Predators were not obligated to cut Fryzel; he like many other players under the four-year requirement according to the CBA, could have been placed on IR. He could have received his salary without bonuses, his housing allowance, etc., however in a "business decision" the Predators cut Fryzel, obligated only to pay for his surgery, rehab, and minuscule workman's compensation.

== Career statistics ==
Season	Rec	Yds	Avg	TDs	Long
2005 Orlando Predators season	78	1149	14.7	18	44
2006 Orlando Preators season	87	1110	12.8	23	45
2007 Orlando Predators season	55	581	10.6	8	31
Career statistics	220	2840	12.7	49	45
