= Lance Mitchell =

American football player (born 1981)

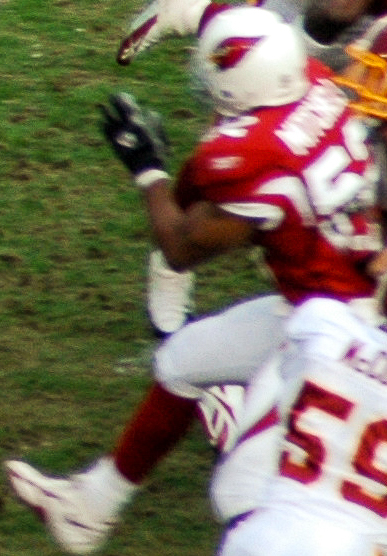
- Mitchell with the Arizona Cardinals in 2005

No. 52
- Position: Fullback / Linebacker

Personal information
- Born: October 9, 1981 (age 45); San Francisco, California, U.S.
- Listed height: 6 ft 2 in (1.88 m)
- Listed weight: 350 lb (159 kg)

Career information
- High school: Los Banos (Los Banos, California)
- College: Oklahoma
- NFL draft: 2005: 5th round, 138th overall pick

Career history
- Arizona Cardinals (2005–2006); Orlando Predators (2007); Arizona Rattlers (2008)*
- * Offseason or practice squad member only

Awards and highlights
- 2× California State champion (2000–2001); 2× JuCo Gridwire National champion; JuCo All-American (2001); Second-team All-American (CNNSI) (2002); Big 12 Defensive Newcomer of the Year (2002); 2× First-team All-Big 12 (2002, 2004); All-Rookie (2007)

Career NFL statistics
- Tackles: 8
- Stats at Pro Football Reference

Career AFL statistics
- Tackles: 15
- Sacks: 2
- Stats at ArenaFan.com

Lance Robert Mitchell (born October 9, 1981) is an American former professional football player who was a linebacker for the Arizona Cardinals of the National Football League (NFL). He played college football for the Oklahoma Sooners and was selected by the Cardinals in the fifth round of the 2005 NFL draft. Mitchell also played for the Orlando Predators and Arizona Rattlers of the Arena Football League (AFL).

== Early life ==
Mitchell attended Los Banos High School, where he was a three-year starter and an All-State selection at both linebacker and running back. As a senior, he averaged 9.6 yards-per-carry, rushed for more than 3,000 yards, and scored 36 touchdowns. His best game as a running back was 12 attempt, 250 yard performance, including six touchdowns.

== College career ==
Mitchell originally signed with the University of Florida, but the Southeastern Conference ruled him ineligible because an issue with his high school transcript. While in college, he majored in Sociology.

=== S.F. City College ===
Mitchell attended San Francisco City College for two years and helped lead his team to a 24–0 record, two California state championships, and two JuCo Gridwire national championships. As a sophomore, he earned All-American honors and recorded five sacks, one interception, and 80 tackles.

=== Oklahoma ===
In 2002, Mitchell transferred to the University of Oklahoma, where he played his final three college seasons.

In his first season at Oklahoma, Mitchell started every game at middle linebacker. He led the team with 124 tackles (87 solos), four sacks, 20 tackles-for-losses, six passes defenses and four forced fumbles. He earned second-team All-American (CNNSI), First-team All-Big 12 Conference, and Big Twelve Newcomer of the Year honors.

In 2003, Mitchell was off to a strong start, recording 17 tackles (13 solos) with two tackles-for-losses in the first two games. However, his season came to an early end after he tore the ACL in his left knee against Fresno State.

As a senior in 2004, Mitchell finished second on the team with 78 tackles (45 solo), two sacks, ten tackles-for-losses, four quarterback pressures, two fumble recoveries, a forced fumble and five passes defensed. For his performance, he earned consensus All-Big 12 Conference first-team honors.

In 29 games at Oklahoma, Mitchell recorded 219 tackles (145 solos) with six sacks, 32 tackles-for-losses, two fumble recoveries, five forced fumbles and eleven passes defensed. Despite playing just a little over two seasons at Oklahoma, his 32 tackles-for-losses rank fifth among Sooner linebackers in a career.

== Professional career ==
=== Pre-draft ===
Mitchell was invited, and attended the 2005 NFL Combine. He was rated the 7th best Inside Linebacker out of 57, and was projected to be selected in the third to fourth rounds of the draft.

Pre-draft measurables
Height	Weight	40-yard dash	10-yard split	20-yard split	20-yard shuttle	Three-cone drill	Vertical jump	Bench press
6 ft 2 1/8 in (1.88 m)	247 lb (112 kg)	4.93 s	1.78 s	2.90 s	4.38 s	7.49 s	33 1/2 in (0.85 m)	15 reps
All values from NFL Combine.

=== National Football League (2005–2006) ===
Mitchell was selected in the fifth round (168th overall) of the 2005 NFL draft by the Arizona Cardinals. As a rookie, he played in 12 games, recording eight tackles on defense, along with 14 special teams tackles. In 2006, he appeared in two preseason games for the Cardinals, however, he suffered an injury, and on September 5 was placed him on Injured Reserve. Then, just three days later, he and the Cardinals agreed on an injury settlement and he was released by the team.

=== Arena Football League (2007–2008) ===
On January 25, 2007, Mitchell signed with the Orlando Predators of the AFL. For his rookie season, he started all 15 games he played in at linebacker. For the season he finished seventh on the team with 18.5 tackles, second on the team with 3.5 tackles-for-losses, and third on the team with two sacks. His performance for the season earned him AFL All-Rookie honors. However, he was not re-signed by the Predators and became a free agent.

On November 19, 2007, Mitchell signed with the Arizona Rattlers. Then on February 6, 2008, he refused to report to camp with the Rattlers. In turn, on September 10, he was waived by the Rattlers.
