= ArenaBowl XII =

American football competition

Orlando Predators (4th)	Tampa Bay Storm (1st)
62	31
	1	2	3	4	Total
ORL	10	14	26	12	62
TB	14	3	8	6	31
- Date: August 23, 1998
- Stadium: Ice Palace; Tampa, Florida, U.S.
- MVP: Rick Hamilton, FB/LB, Orlando: Barry Wagner, WR/DB, Orlando (Ironman of the Game)
- Attendance: 17,222
- Winning coach: Jay Gruden
- Losing coach: Tim Marcum

TV in the United States
- Network: ABC
- Announcers: Mike Adamle, Mike Golic, & Lewis Johnson

ArenaBowl XII was the Arena Football League's twelfth ArenaBowl, which took place August 23, 1998. It pitted the #4 Orlando Predators (9–5) of the National Conference against the #1 Tampa Bay Storm (12–2), also of the National Conference. This was the second and final ArenaBowl to have the "War on I-4" rivalry on the big stage. For the Predators, it was their fourth ArenaBowl appearance in their eight years of existence (having lost ArenaBowls VI, VIII and IX). This year, they were under the command of first-year head coach (and former Tampa Bay Storm QB) Jay Gruden. For the Storm, this was their eighth overall appearance as they were going for their fifth ArenaBowl title in eight seasons. Not only did they face their arch-rivals from Orlando, but they also had face their former star player in Jay Gruden.

== Game summary ==
In the first quarter, the Predators drew first blood with kicker David Cool getting a 23-yard field goal, yet the Storm took the lead with QB Peter Tom Willis completing a 12-yard TD pass to OS George LaFrance. Orlando would respond with QB Pat O'Hara completing a 23-yard TD pass to OS Robert Gordon, yet Tampa Bay answered with Willis and LaFrance hooking up with each other again on a 9-yard TD pass.

In the second quarter, the Predators drew closer with back-up QB Connell Maynor getting a 3-yard TD run, while the Storm had kicker Björn Nittmo get a 44-yard field goal. Afterwards, Orlando took the lead prior to halftime with FB/LB Rick Hamilton getting a 36-yard TD run.

In the third quarter, the Predators took control with Hamilton getting a 5-yard TD run, a safety with OL/DL Webbie Burnett tackling George LaFrance in the end zone after LaFrance recovered his own fumble in the end zone after being hit on the one yard line. Barry Wagner set up Hamilton 's 10-yard run by intercepting WR/DB Barry Wagner returning a missed field goal 48 yards for a touchdown. The only response that Tampa Bay could show was Willis and LaFrance hooking up with each other yet again on a 7-yard TD pass. Afterwards, Orlando wrapped up the period with Cool kicking a 20-yard field goal.

In the fourth quarter, the Predators continued its beatdown with DS Damon Mason returning an interception 22 yards for a touchdown (with a failed PAT). All that was left of the Storm's firepower was Willis' 8-yard TD pass to WR/LB Stevie Thomas (with a failed PAT). Immediately afterwards, Orlando wrapped up its very first Arena Bowl title with Gordon returning a kickoff 8 yards for a touchdown.

== Scoring summary ==
1st Quarter

- ORL – FG Cool 23
- TB – LaFrance 12 pass from Willis (Nittmo kick)
- ORL – Gordon 23 pass from O'Hara (Cool kick)
- TB – LaFrance 9 pass from Willis (Nittmo kick)

2nd Quarter

- ORL – Maynor 3 run (Cool kick)
- TB – FG Nittmo 44
- ORL – Hamilton 36 run (Cool kick)

3rd Quarter

- ORL – Hamilton 5 run (Cool kick)
- ORL – Safety Burnett
- ORL – Hamilton 10 run (Cool kick)
- ORL – Wagner 48 missed field goal (Cool kick)
- TB – LaFrance 7 pass from Willis (Bowden run)
- ORL – FG Cool 20

4th Quarter

- ORL – Mason 22 Interception Return (Cool kick failed)
- TB – Thomas 8 pass from Willis (Nittmo kick failed)
- ORL – Gordon 8 Kickoff Return (Cool kick failed)
