= 2006 Tampa Bay Storm season =

Arena Football League team season

- Head coach: Tim Marcum
- Home stadium: St. Pete Times Forum

Results
- Record: 7–9
- Division place: 3rd
- Playoffs: Did not qualify

The 2006 Tampa Bay Storm season was the 20th season for the team in the Arena Football League and 16th in Tampa. They tried to improve upon their 10–6 record from 2005 in the Southern Division, and looking to get back to the playoffs again. They finished 7–9 and for the first time in franchise history, they missed the playoffs.

== Coaching ==
Tim Marcum, head coach since 1995, entered his 12th year as Storm head coach.

== Season schedule ==
| Week | Date | Opponent | Home/Away | Result |
|---|---|---|---|---|
| 1 | January 29 | Philadelphia Soul | Away | L 52–34 |
| 2 | February 3 | Grand Rapids Rampage | Away | W 51–43 |
| 3 | February 10 | Georgia Force | Home | W 61–60 |
| 4 | February 19 | Orlando Predators | Home | L 67–64 (OT) |
| 5 | February 25 | Austin Wranglers | Home | W 58–48 |
| 6 | March 5 | Kansas City Brigade | Away | W 69–59 |
| 7 | March 12 | Dallas Desperados | Home | L 64–35 |
| 8 | March 18 | New York Dragons | Home | W 60–44 |
| 9 | March 26 | Georgia Force | Away | L 61–51 |
| 10 | April 1 | Utah Blaze | Home | W 56–41 |
| 11 | April 7 | San Jose SaberCats | Home | L 52–43 |
| 12 | April 15 | Austin Wranglers | Away | L 60–59 |
| 13 | April 22 | Orlando Predators | Away | L 52–13 |
| 14 | April 29 | Kansas City Brigade | Home | W 58–42 |
| 15 | May 6 | Columbus Destroyers | Away | L 51–48 |
| 16 | May 13 | Nashville Kats | Away | L 66–50 |

== Regular season ==
=== Week 1: at Philadelphia Soul ===
at the Wachovia Center, Philadelphia

Scoring summary:

1st Quarter:

2nd Quarter:

3rd Quarter:

4th Quarter:

=== Week 2: at Grand Rapids Rampage ===
at Van Andel Arena, Grand Rapids, Michigan

Scoring summary:

1st Quarter:

2nd Quarter:

3rd Quarter:

4th Quarter:

=== Week 3: vs Georgia Force ===
| | 1 | 2 | 3 | 4 | Total |
|---|---|---|---|---|---|
| GEO | 0 | 0 | 0 | 0 | 0 |
| TAM | 0 | 0 | 0 | 0 | 0 |

at the St. Pete Times Forum, Tampa, Florida

Scoring summary:

1st Quarter:

2nd Quarter:

3rd Quarter:

4th Quarter:

=== Week 4: vs Orlando Predators ===
| | 1 | 2 | 3 | 4 | Total |
|---|---|---|---|---|---|
| ORL | 0 | 0 | 0 | 0 | 0 |
| TAM | 0 | 0 | 0 | 0 | 0 |

at the St. Pete Times Forum, Tampa, Florida

Scoring summary:

1st Quarter:

2nd Quarter:

3rd Quarter:

4th Quarter:

=== Week 5: vs Austin Wranglers ===
| | 1 | 2 | 3 | 4 | Total |
|---|---|---|---|---|---|
| AUS | 0 | 0 | 0 | 0 | 0 |
| TAM | 0 | 0 | 0 | 0 | 0 |

at the St. Pete Times Forum, Tampa, Florida

Scoring summary:

1st Quarter:

2nd Quarter:

3rd Quarter:

4th Quarter:

=== Week 6: at Kansas City Brigade ===
at Kemper Arena, Kansas City, Missouri

Scoring summary:

1st Quarter:

2nd Quarter:

3rd Quarter:

4th Quarter:

=== Week 7: vs Dallas Desperados ===
| | 1 | 2 | 3 | 4 | Total |
|---|---|---|---|---|---|
| DAL | 0 | 0 | 0 | 0 | 0 |
| TAM | 0 | 0 | 0 | 0 | 0 |

at the St. Pete Times Forum, Tampa, Florida

Scoring summary:

1st Quarter:

2nd Quarter:

3rd Quarter:

4th Quarter:

=== Week 8: vs New York Dragons ===
| | 1 | 2 | 3 | 4 | Total |
|---|---|---|---|---|---|
| NYD | 0 | 0 | 0 | 0 | 0 |
| TAM | 0 | 0 | 0 | 0 | 0 |

at the St. Pete Times Forum, Tampa, Florida

Scoring summary:

1st Quarter:

2nd Quarter:

3rd Quarter:

4th Quarter:

=== Week 9: at Georgia Force ===
at Philips Arena, Atlanta

Scoring summary:

1st Quarter:

2nd Quarter:

3rd Quarter:

4th Quarter:

=== Week 10: vs Utah Blaze ===
| | 1 | 2 | 3 | 4 | Total |
|---|---|---|---|---|---|
| UTA | 0 | 0 | 0 | 0 | 0 |
| TAM | 0 | 0 | 0 | 0 | 0 |

at the St. Pete Times Forum, Tampa, Florida

Scoring summary:

1st Quarter:

2nd Quarter:

3rd Quarter:

4th Quarter:

=== Week 11: vs San Jose SaberCats ===
| | 1 | 2 | 3 | 4 | Total |
|---|---|---|---|---|---|
| SJS | 0 | 0 | 0 | 0 | 0 |
| TAM | 0 | 0 | 0 | 0 | 0 |

at the St. Pete Times Forum, Tampa, Florida

Scoring summary:

1st Quarter:

2nd Quarter:

3rd Quarter:

4th Quarter:

=== Week 12: at Austin Wranglers ===
at the Frank Erwin Center, Austin, Texas

Scoring summary:

1st Quarter:

2nd Quarter:

3rd Quarter:

4th Quarter:

=== Week 13: at Orlando Predators ===
at Hummer Field at Amway Arena, Orlando, Florida

Scoring summary:

1st Quarter:

2nd Quarter:

3rd Quarter:

4th Quarter:

=== Week 14: vs Kansas City Brigade ===
| | 1 | 2 | 3 | 4 | Total |
|---|---|---|---|---|---|
| KC | 0 | 0 | 0 | 0 | 0 |
| TAM | 0 | 0 | 0 | 0 | 0 |

at the St. Pete Times Forum, Tampa, Florida

Scoring summary:

1st Quarter:

2nd Quarter:

3rd Quarter:

4th Quarter:

=== Week 15: at Columbus Destroyers ===
at Nationwide Arena, Columbus, Ohio

Scoring summary:

1st Quarter:

2nd Quarter:

3rd Quarter:

4th Quarter:

=== Week 16: at Nashville Kats ===
at the Gaylord Entertainment Center, Nashville, Tennessee

Scoring summary:

1st Quarter:

2nd Quarter:

3rd Quarter:

4th Quarter:
