= Connell Maynor =

American football player and coach (born 1969)

Current position
- Title: Offensive analyst
- Team: Wake Forest
- Conference: ACC

Biographical details
- Born: January 21, 1969 (age 57); Fayetteville, North Carolina, U.S.

Playing career
- 1987: Winston-Salem State
- 1989–1991: North Carolina A&T
- 1996: Tampa Bay Storm
- 1997: New York CityHawks
- 1998–2000: Orlando Predators
- 2001: New Jersey Gladiators
- 2002: Carolina Cobras
- 2002–2004: Orlando Predators
- 2006: Philadelphia Soul
- Position: Quarterback

Coaching career (HC unless noted)
- 2000–2008: Fayetteville State (QB)
- 2007–2008: Philadelphia Soul (OC)
- 2009: Fayetteville State (OC/QB)
- 2010–2013: Winston-Salem State
- 2014–2017: Hampton
- 2018–2024: Alabama A&M
- 2025–present: Wake Forest (OA)

Head coaching record
- Overall: 105–63
- Tournaments: 6–3 (NCAA D-II playoffs)

Accomplishments and honors

Championships
- 3 black college national (2011–2012, 2020); 2 CIAA (2011, 2012); 1 SWAC (2020); 3 CIAA South Division (2011–2013); 1 SWAC East Division (2020); 4 ArenaBowl (1996, 1998, 2000, 2008)

Awards
- 2× MEAC Offensive Player of the Year (1990–1991); 2× First-team All-MEAC (1990–1991); ArenaBowl MVP (2000)

Connell Maynor (born January 21, 1969) is an American football coach and former player. He is currently an offensive analyst at Wake Forest, a position he has held since 2025. He was the head football coach at Alabama A&M University until he was relieved of his duties December 2, 2024. Maynor previously served in the same capacity at Hampton University from 2013 to 2017 and Winston-Salem State University (WSSU) from 2010 to 2013. During his tenure at Winston-Salem State, the Rams won two Central Intercollegiate Athletic Association (CIAA) championships and advanced to the NCAA Division II Football Championship title game in 2012. He also played in the Arena Football League (AFL) from 1996 to 2006.

Coach Maynor gained his 100th coaching win with Alabama A&M's 49-7 victory over Kentucky State.

== Head coaching record ==
Year	Team	Overall	Conference	Standing	Bowl/playoffs	AFCA/STATS^{#}	FCS^{°}
Winston-Salem State Rams (Central Intercollegiate Athletic Association) (2010–2013)
2010	Winston-Salem State	8–2	5–2	3rd (South)			
2011	Winston-Salem State	13–1	7–0	1st (South)	L NCAA Division II Semifinal	3	
2012	Winston-Salem State	14–1	7–0	1st (South)	L NCAA Division II Championship	2	
2013	Winston-Salem State	10–2	7–0	1st (South)	L NCAA Division II Second Round	14	
Winston-Salem State:		45–6	26–2				
Hampton Pirates (Mid–Eastern Athletic Conference) (2014–2017)
2014	Hampton	3–9	2–6	T–9th			
2015	Hampton	6–5	5–3	5th			
2016	Hampton	5–6	5–3	T–3rd			
2017	Hampton	6–5	5–3	T–4th			
Hampton:		20–25	17–15				
Alabama A&M Bulldogs (Southwestern Athletic Conference) (2018–2024)
2018	Alabama A&M	6–5	5–2	2nd (East)			
2019	Alabama A&M	7–5	4–3	T–2nd (East)			
2020–21	Alabama A&M	5–0	3–0	1st (East)		24	19
2021	Alabama A&M	7–3	5–3	3rd (East)			
2022	Alabama A&M	4–7	4–4	4th (East)			
2023	Alabama A&M	5–6	3–5	4th (East)			
2024	Alabama A&M	6–6	4–4	4th (East)			
Alabama A&M:		40–32	28–21				
Total:		105–63					
National championship Conference title Conference division title or championship game berth
^{#}Rankings from final NCAA Division II American Football Coaches Association poll for Winston-Salem State and STATS poll for Alabama A&M.
