= Kevin Nagle =

American football player (born 1975)

Kevin Nagle (born April 30, 1975) is a former American football fullback and linebacker who played for seven years in the Arena Football League with the Orlando Predators and then the Colorado Crush.

== High school career ==
Nagle attended Pleasant Valley High School in Brodheadsville, Pennsylvania, where he lettered in football and wrestling. As a freshman quarterback, he led Pleasant Valley to a victory over Pocono Mountain, the school's arch rival.

== College career ==
Nagle played college football for the East Stroudsburg Warriors at East Stroudsburg University, where he was named PSAC East defensive player of the year in 1998 and 2000. In his four year career with East Stroudsburg, he recorded 447 career tackles, the second most in school history.

== Arena Football League ==
Nagle played for the Orlando Predators until he was cut in the 2007 season. He then signed with the Colorado Crush, where his jersey number was #11.

After the AFL suspended its 2009 season, Nagle retired and became assistant coach for Pleasant Valley High School, his alma mater. Following the 2013 Pleasant Valley football season, Nagle retired from his coaching career in Pleasant Valley with an 8-3 record on the season and a second place finish in the Division AAAA championship in Pennsylvania.

In 2013, Nagle was inducted into the East Stroudsburg University Hall of Fame.
