= DeAndrew Rubin =

American football player (born 1978)

No. 80, 83
- Position: Wide receiver

Personal information
- Born: October 8, 1978 (age 48); St. Petersburg, Florida, U.S.
- Listed height: 5 ft 11 in (1.80 m)
- Listed weight: 175 lb (79 kg)

Career information
- High school: Dixie Hollins (St. Petersburg)
- College: South Florida (1998–2002)
- NFL draft: 2003: 7th round, 253rd overall pick

Career history
- Green Bay Packers (2003)*; Indianapolis Colts (2004)*; → Amsterdam Admirals (2004); → Scottish Claymores (2004); Tampa Bay Buccaneers (2004–2005)*; Detroit Lions (2005)*; Orlando Predators (2006–2007); New Orleans VooDoo (2008); Orlando Predators (2008); Tampa Bay Storm (2010); Dallas Vigilantes (2011); Lakeland Raiders (2013)
- * Offseason or practice squad member only

Career AFL statistics
- Receptions: 265
- Receiving yards: 3,771
- Receiving touchdowns: 71
- Return yards: 666
- Return touchdowns: 1
- Stats at ArenaFan.com

DeAndrew Trajo Rubin (born October 8, 1978) is an American former professional football wide receiver. Rubin played college football at South Florida, and was selected by the Green Bay Packers in the seventh round of the 2003 NFL draft.

== Early life ==
Rubin attended Dixie Hollins High School in St. Petersburg, Florida. He earned honorable mention All-Suncoast honors his senior year in 1997.

== College career ==
Rubin played college football for the South Florida Bulls from 1998 to 2002. He was redshirted in 1998. He caught 17 passes for 189 yards and two touchdowns in 2000, 34 passes for 532 yards and four touchdowns in 2001, and 18 passes for 357 yards and three touchdowns in 2002. Rubin also returned 64 punts for 1,049 yards and four touchdowns, and 37 kicks for 956 yards and one touchdown during his college career.

== Professional career ==
=== Green Bay Packers ===
Rubin was selected by the Green Bay Packers in the seventh round, with the 253rd overall pick, of the 2003 NFL draft. He officially signed with the team on June 12. He was waived by the Packers on August 25, 2003.

=== Indianapolis Colts ===
Rubin signed with the Indianapolis Colts on January 19, 2004. He was allocated to NFL Europe in 2004 and played for both the Amsterdam Admirals and Scottish Claymores during the 2004 NFL Europe season. He began the season with the Admirals, playing in two games while catching two passes for 26 yards. Rubin then appeared in six games, starting one, for the Scottish Claymores, recording two receptions for 35 yards whole also returning five punts for 32 yards. He was waived by the Colts on September 5, 2004.

=== Tampa Bay Buccaneers ===
Rubin was signed to the practice squad of the Tampa Bay Buccaneers on September 21, 2004. He re-signed with the team on January 10, 2005. He was waived by the Buccaneers on September 3 but was re-signed to the practice squad on September 5. He was released on September 7, 2005.

=== Detroit Lions ===
Rubin was signed to the practice squad of the Detroit Lions on October 11, 2005.

Rubin never played in a regular season NFL game.

=== Orlando Predators (first stint) ===
Rubin signed with the Orlando Predators of the Arena Football League (AFL) on January 17, 2006. He was placed on injured reserve on February 24 and activated on March 7, 2006. Overall, he played in 13 games during his AFL rookie season with the Predators in 2006, totaling 46 catches for 588 yards and ten touchdowns, two rushing touchdowns, 15 solo tackles, five assisted tackles, two fumble recoveries, and one interception that was returned for a touchdown.

Rubin appeared in four games for the Predators in 2007, catching 25 passes for 318 yards and seven touchdowns while also returning 18 kicks for 341 yards. He was placed on injured reserve on March 27, 2007.

=== New Orleans VooDoo ===
Rubin was signed by the New Orleans VooDoo of the AFL on January 17, 2008. He was placed on injured reserve on February 15, and activated on March 28. Overall, he accumulated 22 receptions for 268 yards and six touchdowns and five solo tackles for the VooDoo in 2008. Rubin was waived on May 24, 2008.

=== Orlando Predators (second stint) ===
Rubin re-joined the Predators a day after being waived by the VooDoo. He caught 10 passes for 131 yards and two touchdowns while also making two solo tackles for the Predators in 2008. He was waived on July 28, 2008.

=== Tampa Bay Storm ===
Rubin was assigned to the Tampa Bay Storm of the AFL on March 21, 2010. He caught five touchdown passes in his first game with the Storm. Overall, he totaled 70 receptions for 1,113 yards and 22 touchdowns in 2010.

=== Dallas Vigilantes ===
Rubin was assigned to the AFL's Dallas Vigilantes on February 22, 2011. He caught 92 passes for 1,353 yards and 24 touchdowns during the 2011 season.
