= Al Lucas (American football) =

American football player (1978–2005)

No. 71, 76
- Position: Defensive tackle

Personal information
- Born: September 1, 1978; Macon, Georgia, U.S.
- Died: April 10, 2005 (aged 26); Los Angeles, California, U.S.

Career information
- High school: Macon (GA) Northeast
- College: Troy State
- NFL draft: 2000: undrafted

Career history
- Pittsburgh Steelers (2000)*; Carolina Panthers (2000–2001); Frankfurt Galaxy (2003)*; Tampa Bay Storm (2003); Los Angeles Avengers (2004–2005)
- * Offseason or practice squad member only

Awards and highlights
- ArenaBowl champion (2003); Buck Buchanan Award (1999)

Career NFL statistics
- Tackles: 38
- Sacks: 1
- Passes defended: 2
- Stats at Pro Football Reference
- Stats at ArenaFan.com

Albert Lucas (September 1, 1978 – April 10, 2005) was an American professional football player who played in the National Football League (NFL) and Arena Football League (AFL). He died from a game-related spinal cord injury while playing for the Los Angeles Avengers.

== Early life and college ==
Lucas was born in Macon, Georgia; his father was Georgia State Representative David Lucas and his mother was Macon City Councilwoman Elaine Lucas. He attended and played football for Northeast Health Science Magnet High School. While there, he set the school record with a 440-pound (200-kg) bench press. Nicknamed "Big Luke", he went on to play college football at Troy State University. Lucas also served as an assistant football coach at Northeast High. He was married to De'Shonda Lucas with one daughter, Mariah. He was a member of the Omega Psi Phi fraternity.

At Troy State, Lucas was a standout player. In his senior year (1999), he won the Buck Buchanan Award as the most outstanding defensive player in NCAA Division I-AA. He was also honored with unanimous All America and All-Southland Football League first-team selections that year, in which he compiled 126 tackles (twenty for losses), 15 "quarterback hurries", four sacks, and two forced fumbles.

Lucas played a total of 43 games for the Trojans, and finished his college career with 255 tackles (thirty-six for losses), 25 quarterback hurries, and 11.5 sacks. In addition, he saw some limited action at running back in his junior and senior seasons, scoring seven touchdowns.

== Professional career ==
After going undrafted in the 2000 NFL draft, Lucas signed with the Pittsburgh Steelers of the NFL on April 21, 2000. He was later released on August 27, 2000.

Lucas was signed to the practice squad of the NFL's Carolina Panthers on September 20, 2000. He was promoted to the active roster on September 30, and played in 20 games for the Panthers over the course of the 2000 and 2001 seasons. He totaled 49.5 tackles, three quarterback hurries, two batted down passes, a forced fumble, and a sack. He was selected by the Frankfurt Galaxy with the fourth overall pick in the 2003 NFL Europa free-agent draft, but chose instead to begin his Arena Football League (AFL) career with the Tampa Bay Storm.

In his rookie season with the Storm, Lucas had an immediate impact on his new team. He had 19.5 tackles, three for losses, 1.5 sacks, a blocked kick, and a safety, and was a major factor in the Storm's ArenaBowl victory over the Arizona Rattlers. He was named to the AFL's All-Rookie team, and after that season, Lucas was one of the most sought-after free agents in the League, and signed a three-year contract with Los Angeles on October 27, 2003.

In the 2004 season, Lucas played in all 16 games for the AFL's Los Angeles Avengers and led the team's linemen with 18.5 tackles. He also had three quarterback sacks, three fumble recoveries (one for a touchdown), two batted down passes, a forced fumble, and a safety.

== NFL career statistics ==
Legend
**Bold**	Career high

Year	Team	Games		Tackles					Interceptions					Fumbles			
Year	Team	GP	GS	Cmb	Solo	Ast	Sck	TFL	Int	Yds	TD	Lng	PD	FF	FR	Yds	TD
2000	CAR	**13**	0	**24**	**20**	**4**	0.0	**4**	0	0	0	0	**1**	**2**	**1**	0	0
2001	CAR	7	0	14	11	3	**1.0**	3	0	0	0	0	**1**	0	0	0	0
		20	0	38	31	7	1.0	7	0	0	0	0	2	2	1	0	0

== Death ==
On April 10, 2005, in a game against the New York Dragons, Lucas tackled Corey Johnson during a kickoff return with 10:17 to go in the first quarter. Replays showed that Johnson's knee hit Lucas' helmet, and Lucas did not move again after falling to the ground. Later replays and reports showed nothing abnormal on the play. Dr. William Lang, the team physician, attempted to revive him on the field. He appeared to suffer a spinal cord injury. After being treated for approximately a half an hour at the Staples Center, Lucas was rushed to nearby California Hospital Medical Center, where he was pronounced dead at 1:28pm PDT. It is unknown whether Lucas died on the field, or after treatment failed. An autopsy revealed that he died of blunt force trauma and an upper spinal cord injury.

Approximately half an hour after the game concluded, Lucas's death was confirmed by Avengers' primary team physician, Luga Podesta, who stated, "During the game today, Al Lucas suffered a presumed spinal cord injury and was brought to California Hospital Medical Center where all attempts to revive him were unsuccessful. He was pronounced dead at 1:28 p.m."

== Legacy ==
The Avengers retired Lucas's number 76 during the 2006 season and the Tampa Bay Storm created the Mariah Lucas Scholarship Fund to benefit Lucas's daughter and wife, and the Lucas family itself started an Al Lucas Memorial Scholarship Fund which provides college scholarships to high school athletes.

The Maxwell Football Club renamed its Arena Football League Player of the Year Award to the Al Lucas Award in honor of Lucas; this award was discontinued after the 2007 season. The East Macon Park Little League field where Lucas played baseball was renamed Albert James Lucas "Big Luke" Memorial Field in 2006, and the AFL has renamed its Hero Award the Al Lucas Award.

== See also ==
- List of gridiron football players who died during their careers
