= Stylez G. White =

American football player (born 1979)

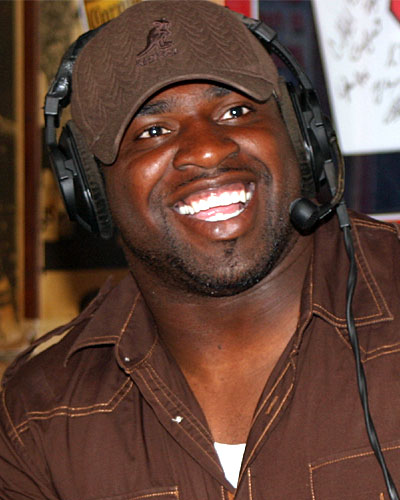
- White in 2008

No. 91, 94
- Position: Defensive end

Personal information
- Born: July 25, 1979 (age 47); Newark, New Jersey, U.S.
- Listed height: 6 ft 3 in (1.91 m)
- Listed weight: 270 lb (122 kg)

Career information
- High school: Malcolm X Shabazz (Newark)
- College: Minnesota
- NFL draft: 2002: 7th round, 229th overall pick

Career history
- Houston Texans (2002)*; Tampa Bay Buccaneers (2002)*; Atlanta Falcons (2002)*; Tennessee Titans (2002)*; New Orleans Saints (2003)*; Washington Redskins (2003–2004)*; Chicago Bears (2005)*; → Cologne Centurions (2005); Orlando Predators (2006–2007); Tampa Bay Buccaneers (2007–2010); Minnesota Vikings (2011)*; Virginia Destroyers (2011–2012)
- * Offseason or practice squad member only

Awards and highlights
- Led the NFL Europe in Sacks (7) (2005); Led the AFL in Sacks (15) (2007); AFL All-Rookie Team (2006); First-team All-Arena (2007); Al Lucas Award (2007); AFL Lineman of the Year (2007); AFL Defensive Player of the Year (2007); UFL champion (2011)

Career NFL statistics
- Total tackles: 111
- Sacks: 24.0
- Forced fumbles: 10
- Fumble recoveries: 2
- Stats at Pro Football Reference
- Stats at ArenaFan.com

Stylez G. White (born Gregory Alphonso White Jr. on July 25, 1979) is an American former professional football player who was a defensive end in the National Football League (NFL). He was selected by the Houston Texans in the seventh round of the 2002 NFL draft. He played college football for the Minnesota Golden Gophers.

White was also a member of the Tampa Bay Buccaneers, Atlanta Falcons, Tennessee Titans, New Orleans Saints, Washington Redskins, Chicago Bears, Cologne Centurions, Orlando Predators, Tampa Bay Buccaneers, Minnesota Vikings and Virginia Destroyers.

== College career ==
White left New Jersey to attend the University of Minnesota. White played for the Gophers from 1998 to 2001; recording 132 total tackles and 11 quarterback sacks. He led the team with eight tackles-for- loss, five quarterback sacks and five forced fumbles his senior year and earned honorable mention All-Big Ten by both the coaches and media. White played defensive end and line backer which is what he was known for in college.

== Professional career ==
=== Houston Texans ===
White was selected in the seventh round of the 2002 NFL draft by the Houston Texans. He signed with the team in June, and made an instant impact during the preseason. In a 13–10 win over the New Orleans Saints, White recorded 4 sacks and 2 forced fumbles in a single game. "You have to be in the right place at the right time doing the right job," White said "I like this a lot. Hopefully I'll do a lot more pass rushing." White was waived by the team on August 25, 2002.

=== Tampa Bay Buccaneers (first stint) ===
White was signed to the practice squad of the Tampa Bay Buccaneers on September 4, 2002. He was released on September 19, signed to the practice squad on October 22, and released again on November 5, 2002.

=== Atlanta Falcons ===
White was signed to the practice squad of the Atlanta Falcons on November 27, 2002. He was released on December 24, 2002.

=== Tennessee Titans ===
White was signed to the practice squad of the Tennessee Titans on January 3, 2003. He was released on January 14, 2003.

=== New Orleans Saints ===
White signed with the New Orleans Saints on January 29, 2003. He was waived on August 31 and signed to the practice squad on September 17. He was released on September 30, 2003.

=== Washington Redskins ===
White was signed to the practice squad of the Washington Redskins on December 10, 2003. He signed a reserve/future contract with the Redskins on January 2, 2004. He was waived on August 30, 2004.

=== Chicago Bears ===
Whited signed a reserve/future contract with the Chicago Bears on January 3, 2005. He was allocated to NFL Europe to play for the Cologne Centurions in 2005. He recorded 7 sacks for a total of 56 yards lost, leading the entire league in both categories that year.

White then spent the NFL preseason with the Bears. He turned in a 2 sack performance in a 16–6 loss to the Cleveland Browns, the Bears last game of the preseason. "Hopefully I displayed enough to get a shot on this team" said White after the game. He was waived the following day. He was waived on September 2, 2005.

=== Orlando Predators ===
In January 2006, White signed a contract to play for the Orlando Predators of the Arena Football League. In his 2-year stint in Orlando, White compiled 17 sacks, including an AFL-record 15 in 2007. He was named the ADT Defensive Player of the Year in 2007.

=== Tampa Bay Buccaneers (second stint) ===
==== 2007 ====
After the Predators were eliminated from the 2007 playoffs, Predators head coach Jay Gruden (the younger brother of Tampa Bay Buccaneers head coach Jon Gruden) recommended White to the Buccaneers head coach, who promptly invited him to training camp with the team.

White was further enticed to Tampa by defensive coordinator Monte Kiffin, who promised him a real shot at making the roster instead of simply being another (training) "camp body". White signed with the Buccaneers on August 4, 2007.

After making the cut at training camp, White was instantly thrust into the limelight on the Buccaneers defensive line. The release of veteran Pro Bowl end Simeon Rice shortly before the start of the pre-season, injuries to free agent acquisition Patrick Chukwurah and the fact that top five 2007 NFL draft pick Gaines Adams was deemed not ready led to White seeing extended playing time on the field.

In the game against the Atlanta Falcons in November 2007 White turned in a career performance. Starting opposite fellow rookie Adams, he sacked Falcons quarterback Byron Leftwich twice and forced two fumbles, one of which was returned for a touchdown by Ronde Barber. The Bucs won the game 31–7 to take a 2-game lead at the top of the NFC South. After the game, Coach Jon Gruden was quoted as saying:

Every time he makes a play, I can hear my brother up in the press box saying: 'I told you so.' But he's a good kid, a good guy, a hard worker, and he does have natural pass-rush ability. He's raw a little bit in terms of the big picture, but I give a lot of credit to Greg White. We got him late in training camp, and he's made a real impression on all of us.

White ended the 2007 season, his first with the Buccaneers, leading the team with 8 sacks despite starting only 2 games.

He also led the team that year with 7 forced fumbles, tied with Broderick Thomas for the most in franchise history in a single year. White tied James Harrison for second in the NFL that year for forced fumbles, despite Harrison starting all 16 games and White starting just two. Harrison was named to the Pro Bowl for the season.

==== 2008 ====
An exclusive-rights free agent in the 2008 offseason, White signed his one-year, $370,000 tender offer on July 26. White later signed a new three-year, $2.845 million contract on September 15, 2008, with the possibility to earn more money in incentives. White was set to become a free agent in 2011.

White finished the 2008 season with 5 sacks, tied for second most on the team.

==== 2009 ====
For the 2009 season, White again led the Buccaneers in sacks with 6.5. Through Week 8, his first stint as a starting player, he also led the team with 28 quarterback pressures.

==== 2010 ====
In 2010, his last with the Buccaneers, White recorded 4.5 sacks, leading the team for the third time in his four years in Tampa. He also finished the year tied for most forced fumbles on the team with 2

=== Minnesota Vikings ===
On August 22, 2011, White signed with the Minnesota Vikings. He was released on September 2, 2011.

=== Virginia Destroyers ===
White was signed by the Virginia Destroyers of the United Football League on October 12, 2011. He played for the Destroyers from 2011 to 2012.

== Personal life ==
On December 15, 2008, it was revealed that the Hillsborough County Circuit Court had approved White's request to legally change his name from Gregory Alphonso White Jr. to Stylez G. White. According to White, the inspiration for the change came from a character in the 1985 Michael J. Fox film Teen Wolf.

At the start of the 2022 NFL season, White began writing a weekly column covering the Buccaneers for the St. Pete Catalyst. He returned for a second year of coverage in 2023.

White has also been the general manager for a sports bar in the Tampa area. Before then, he had a quick run with WaWa gas stations and World of Beer.

== Legacy ==
The official Buccaneers website ranks White as the best player in franchise history to wear the number 91.

FanSided ranked White as the 10th best pass rusher in Buccaneers franchise history.

In 2019, the Tampa Bay Times ranked White as the 71st greatest Buccaneer of all time.

White's seven forced fumbles in 2007 are tied for most in a single season in Buccaneers franchise history (Broderick Thomas 1991), and as of 2023 are the most in the past 30 seasons.

White holds the record for the second most sacks of any rookie in Buccaneer history (8 in 2007) behind only Santana Dotson (10 in 1992).
