= Barry Wagner =

American football player (born 1967)

No. 82, 2, 81
- Position: Wide receiver / Linebacker

Personal information
- Born: November 24, 1967 (age 58); Greensboro, Alabama, U.S.
- Listed height: 6 ft 3 in (1.91 m)
- Listed weight: 210 lb (95 kg)

Career information
- High school: Greensboro
- College: Alabama A&M
- NFL draft: 1990: undrafted

Career history
- Orlando Predators (1992–1999); Chicago Bears (1992); Indianapolis Colts (1994)*; New Jersey Red Dogs (1999)*; San Jose SaberCats (2000–2006); Tampa Bay Storm (2007)*; Daytona Beach Thunder (2007)*; Orlando Predators (2007)
- * Offseason or practice squad member only

Awards and highlights
- 3× ArenaBowl champion (1998, 2002, 2004); 8× First-team All-Arena (1992-1997, 2002, 2003); AFL MVP (1995); AFL Offensive Player of the Year (1997); 6× AFL Ironman of the Year (1992-1997); AFL's 10th Anniversary Team (1996); Arena Football Hall of Fame

Career NFL statistics
- Receptions: 1
- Receiving yards: 16
- Stats at Pro Football Reference

Career AFL statistics
- Receptions-Yards-TDs: 991 - 13,363 - 256
- Rushes-Yards-TDs: 356 - 855 - 127
- Tackles-Sacks: 677 - 2
- Interceptions: 47
- Returns-Yards-TDs: 345 - 6,279 - 9
- Stats at ArenaFan.com

Barry Wagner (born November 24, 1967) is an American former professional football player in the Arena Football League (AFL) for the Orlando Predators, with whom he won his first ArenaBowl Championship, and the San Jose SaberCats, with whom he won two championships. He also played in the World Indoor Football League (WIFL) as a wide receiver/defensive back with the Daytona Beach Thunder. Wagner is the all-time AFL all-purpose yardage leader. He is considered the best Arena Football player of all time. During the 2012 Arena Football League season, Wagner was named the league's greatest player of all time.

== Early life ==
Wagner attended Greensboro Public School in Greensboro, Alabama, where he was a member of the football team. Wagner served as a wide receiver and the backup quarterback.

== College career ==
While attending Alabama A&M University, Wagner starred in football and broke many school records held by former Pittsburgh Steeler John Stallworth. As a senior, he caught 112 passes for 1,817 yards (16.22 yards per rec. avg.), won Associated Press and Football News Division II All-America honors, was the Southern Intercollegiate Athletic Conference Player of the Year, and played in the 1989 Senior Bowl. In one game against Clark Atlanta University, he caught 23 passes, setting two school single game records with 370 receiving yards and 5 receiving touchdowns.

== Professional career ==
=== Arena Football ===
During his initial tenure with the Orlando Predators, Wagner was a key component in the famous "Miracle Minute", in which he scored two touchdowns, two two-point conversions, recovered an onside kick, and made a key defensive stop, all in the final minute of a 1992 game against the Detroit Drive. He was a 7-time AFL Ironman of the Year award winner, 7 years in a row (1992–1997) He was traded to the New Jersey Red Dogs for Alvin Ashley on September 23, 1999, after requesting a trade. However, soon after the trade, the league and its players agreed to a new collective bargaining agreement that resulted in several veteran players — including Wagner — gaining free agency. Wagner then signed with the San Jose SaberCats.

Wagner played for the Sabercats from 2000 to 2006, and won the ArenaBowl with San Jose in 2002 and 2004.

During the AFL's 20th season in 2006, the league named Wagner the league's second greatest player of all time behind Eddie Brown. Barry Wagner was officially named the greatest Arena Football League (AFL) player of all time during the 2012 AFL season. This honor recognized his legendary two-way play, record-breaking stats, and unmatched impact on the game.

On Wednesday, March 28, 2007, after being cut from the Tampa Bay Storm's practice squad, he joined the Daytona Beach Thunder of the WIFL. However, after the Thunder ended their season at 4–10, he rejoined the Predators for the 2007 AFL playoffs. On June, Friday 13th, 2008 during halftime at the Week 16 game vs. New Orleans VooDoo, Barry Wagner officially retired from the AFL.

Wagner finished his career with 991 receptions for 13,363 yards and 265 touchdowns. From 1993 to 1999, Wagner posted seven consecutive 1,000 yard receiving seasons. He had 855 rushing yards for 127 touchdowns. On special teams, Wagner posted 6,279 return yards and nine touchdowns, with four of them coming in 1999. Defensively, Wagner finished his career with 677 tackles, 28 forced fumbles, recovering 14, with 47 interceptions and five defensive scores.

He is the AFL's all-time leader in rushing touchdowns with 127, until it was broken by Derrick Ross on June 6, 2014.

As of the 2011 AFL season, he ranks third in league history in receptions, second in receiving yards behind Damian Harrell, fourth in receiving touchdowns. Wagner is tied for second in all-time tackles and fourth in interceptions.

=== NFL career ===
Wagner was originally signed by the New England Blitz of the Professional Spring Football League in 1992. He was signed as a free agent by the Chicago Bears in 1992 and spent the entire season on the active roster playing on special teams. He earned a contract from the Indianapolis Colts and was on the practice squad for the entire 1994 season.
