= World Indoor Football League (2007) =

Defunct American indoor football league

- Sport: American football
- Founded: 2007
- Folded: 2007
- CEO: Gary Tufford (Executive Director & Commissioner)
- Country: United States
- Last champion: Augusta Spartans

The World Indoor Football League (WIFL) was an indoor football league founded by Harry Pierce, owner of the Rome Renegades and Raleigh Rebels of the American Indoor Football League. The league was a splinter league that formed after disgruntled ownership in the AIFL, caused significant turmoil and resulted in several teams leaving the league.

Both the Rebels and Renegades were to play in the league, with the Rebels to be renamed as the Carolina Bombers. However, on October 16, 2006, Pierce folded both franchises.

Daytona Beach Thunder player Javan Camon, in his second year with the club, died as a result of injuries received during a game against the Columbus Lions on February 26, 2007. Camon was involved in a helmet-to-helmet block during the late stages of the game. He was attended by paramedics and doctors at the Ocean Center arena for approximately 25 minutes without recovering. He was pronounced dead on arrival at an area hospital. So, in his honor, the league's MVP award was named after him as the Javan Camon Award. The award was given to Marvin Stone of the Augusta Spartans. Columbus Lions' Jason Gibson was named Coach of the Year, and Danny Burnham of Rome, Georgia. was named Fan of the Year for his efforts assisting the league's PR department.

Daytona Beach also made some news in the indoor football ranks when arena football legend Barry Wagner joined the team in March 2007; Daytona Beach had previously attempted such a publicity stunt by signing Terry Bradshaw to a similar contract in 2006. The Osceola Ghostriders also featured former New England Patriot Greg Jefferson for one game.

On June 30, the league's only championship game, the World Indoor Bowl, took place in Columbus, Georgia with the Augusta Spartans defeating the host Columbus Lions 63-60 before a crowd of 3,529.

Two teams – Columbus and Augusta – announced on September 28, 2007, that they were moving to a reformed American Indoor Football Association for 2008.

The announcement came after the Daytona Beach Thunder announced they were leaving the WIFL in hopes of joining AF2 for either the 2008 or 2009 season..

== World Indoor Bowl ==
The World Indoor Bowl was the championship game of the World Indoor Football League. The only World Indoor Bowl was played between the regular season champion Columbus Lions and the Augusta Spartans, who won a semi-final game against the Osceola Ghostriders to earn the berth.

Game	Year	Winning Team		Losing Team		Site
World Indoor Bowl I	2007	Augusta Spartans	63	Columbus Lions	60	Columbus Civic Center

== 2007 teams ==
- Augusta Spartans – rejoined AIFA for 2008 under new ownership as the Augusta Colts. Folded after 2008 season
- Columbus Lions – joined AIFA for 2008
- Daytona Beach Thunder – joined AF2 in 2008 but folded after the season
- Osceola Ghostriders – folded after 2007 season

== Announced WIFL teams that never participated in league play ==
- Carolina Bombers – ceased operations during 2006 off-season
- Charleston Sandsharks – announced move from NIFL, then withdrew and joined AIFA
- Huntington Heroes – announced move from, then returned to, AIFA
- Rome Renegades – ceased operations during 2006 off-season
- Tallahassee Titans – were to move from the AIFA to WIFL for the cancelled 2008 season.
