= Javarus Dudley =

American football player (born 1981)

No. 10
- Position: Wide receiver

Personal information
- Born: December 18, 1981 (age 44); Hollywood, Florida, U.S.
- Listed height: 5 ft 11 in (1.80 m)
- Listed weight: 185 lb (84 kg)

Career information
- College: Fordham
- NFL draft: 2002: undrafted

Career history
- Orlando Predators (2006–2007); New Orleans VooDoo (2008); Tampa Bay Storm (2010)

Awards and highlights
- AFL All-Rookie Team (2006)

Career AFL statistics
- Receptions: 261
- Receiving yards: 3,647
- Receiving TDs: 61
- Rushing yards: 89
- Rushing TDs: 7
- Stats at ArenaFan.com

Javarus Dudley (born December 18, 1981) is an American former professional football wide receiver who played in the Arena Football League (AFL) for the Orlando Predators, New Orleans VooDoo and Tampa Bay Storm. He attended Fordham University.
