= Reggie Lee (American football) =

American football player (1973–2021)

No. 92, 99
- Position: Offensive lineman/Defensive lineman

Personal information
- Born: October 26, 1973
- Died: February 19, 2021 (aged 47)
- Listed height: 6 ft 1 in (1.85 m)
- Listed weight: 290 lb (132 kg)

Career information
- College: Florida A&M

Career history
- Orlando Predators (2000–2007)

Awards and highlights
- ArenaBowl champion (2000)

Reggie Lee (October 26, 1973 – February 19, 2021) was an Arena Football League offensive lineman/defensive lineman for the Orlando Predators.

== NCAA career ==
Lee attended Florida A&M University in 1994 and 1995. He finished his two-year career there with 14 sacks and 186 tackles (19 for losses), and as a senior, he was a second-team All-America selection.
