= Augusta Colts =

Logo

General information
- Founded: 2006
- Folded: 2009
- Headquartered: Augusta, Georgia at the James Brown Arena
- Colors: Texas orange, navy blue, white

Personnel
- Head coach: Bubba Diggs 2006–2008; Cedric Roach 2009-never actually coached a game
- President: John Sisson III

Team history
- Augusta Spartans (2006–2007); Augusta Colts (2008)

Home fields
- James Brown Arena (2006–2008)

League / conference affiliations
- American Indoor Football League (2006); World Indoor Football League (2007); American Indoor Football Association (2008)

Championships
- League championships: 1; 2007

Playoff appearances (1)
- 2007

The Augusta Colts were a professional indoor football team based in Augusta, Georgia. The team played their home games at the James Brown Arena.

== History ==
The Colts originally began in 2006 as the Augusta Spartans of the American Indoor Football League. After a mediocre season, they played in the World Indoor Football League in 2007. During the year, the Spartans went 8–6, defeated the Osceola Ghostriders in the opening round of the playoffs, and won the World Indoor Bowl over the Columbus Lions. Wide receiver Marvin Stone was named the 2007 league MVP and received the Javan Camon Award.

For the 2008, the team moved back to the renamed American Indoor Football Association and renamed themselves the Augusta Colts.

In a press release, it was announced that the Colts would sit out the 2009 season, but planned to return for the 2010 season. Another press release then reported that for the 2010 season, the Colts would join the Southern Indoor Football League.

On November 16, 2009, a group of investors held a press conference with John Sisson saying that they had purchased the team. However, on December 5, 2009, the deal could not be reached and the group deciding to start a new team in Augusta as a member of the SIFL. The Colts were suspended indefinitely.

== Season-by-season ==
Season records
Season	W	L	T	Finish	Playoff results
Augusta Spartans (AIFL)
2006	5	9	0	6th Southern	—
Augusta Spartans (WIFL)
2007	8	6	0	2nd League	Won Opening Round (Osceola); Won World Indoor Bowl I (Columbus)
Augusta Colts (AIFA)
2008	7	7	0	3rd WC Southern	—
Totals	22	22	0	(including playoffs)	
