= ArenaBowl XIV =

Nashville Kats (#6)	Orlando Predators (#2)
38	41
	1	2	3	4	Total
NAS	7	16	7	8	38
ORL	15	14	3	9	41
- Date: August 20, 2000
- Stadium: TD Waterhouse Centre, Orlando, Florida
- MVP: Connell Maynor, QB, Orlando: James Baron, OL/DL, Nashville (Ironman of the Game)
- Attendance: 15,989
- Winning coach: Jay Gruden
- Losing coach: Pat Sperduto

TV in the United States
- Network: ABC
- Announcers: Mike Gleason, Ed Cunningham, and Merril Hoge

ArenaBowl XIV is widely hailed as one of the most exciting games in ArenaBowl history, ranking alongside classics such as ArenaBowl XVIII and ArenaBowl XIX. Featuring two teams from the Arena Football League's Southern Division, the game went as a Southern Division game might be expected to: a low-scoring, largely defensive struggle. In the end, however, Orlando Predator kicker David Cool converted a 19-yard field goal as time expired to give the Predators a 41-38 victory over the Nashville Kats and their second ArenaBowl title in three years.

== Game summary ==
The Orlando Predators got out to a fast start in ArenaBowl XIV, opening the game with a safety and following with a pair of touchdowns to take a 15-0 lead. Though Nashville quarterback Andy Kelly would soon connect with Jeff Russell to pull within 15-7, Predators quarterback Connell Maynor answered with two more touchdown passes of his own, putting Orlando ahead 29-7 with 10 minutes to play in the first half. The score remained that way for nearly eight minutes until Nashville's William Gaines recorded a safety, seemingly awakening the Kats and beginning a furious comeback.

Kelly threw for two touchdowns in the final minute of the first half, pulling the Kats within six at halftime, and took a 30-29 lead by opening the second half with a touchdown pass to lineman James Baron. A field goal by Orlando's David Cool was followed by a touchdown pass from Maynor to Bret Cooper (though, critically, Cool missed the extra point), giving the Predators a 38-30 advantage early in the fourth quarter. Nashville's momentum was further slowed by the loss of Kelly, who left with a knee injury and was replaced by rookie backup James Brown. Brown threw an interception on his first possession but, after Cool missed a 22-yard field goal, quickly atoned for the mistake by finding Darryl Hammond for a 45-yard score, and connected with Cory Fleming for the two-point conversion, tying the game at 38 with 6:26 to play. Defense again took over as the game went scoreless until the Predators drove down the field to set up a potentially game-winning 19-yard field goal by Cool as time expired. Cool had struggled all game, having missed two extra points and three field goals, but was able to convert this one, giving Orlando the 41-38 win.

== Scoring summary ==
1st Quarter

- ORL - Safety
- ORL - Dell 16 pass from Maynor (Cool kick)
- ORL - Douglass 3 run (Cool kick failed)
- NASH - Russell 33 pass from Kelly (McLaughlin kick)

2nd Quarter

- ORL - Hamilton 18 pass from Maynor (Cool kick)
- ORL - Douglass 5 pass from Maynor (Cool kick)
- NASH - Safety
- NASH - Fleming 1 pass from Kelly (McLaughlin kick)
- NASH - Hammond 5 pass from Kelly (McLaughlin kick)

3rd Quarter

- NASH - Baron 28 pass from Kelly (McLaughlin kick)
- ORL - FG Cool 38

4th Quarter

- ORL - Cooper 15 pass from Maynor (Cool kick failed)
- NASH - Hammond 45 pass from Brown (Fleming pass from Brown)
- ORL - FG Cool 19

== Trivia ==
- On the Arena Football League's 20 Greatest Highlights Countdown (shown on arenafootball.com during the AFL's 20th season), this game is tied at #17.
