= Orlando Predators =

Arena football team

Logo

General information
- Founded: 1991
- Folded: 2016
- Headquartered: Amway Center in Orlando, Florida
- Colors: Black, red, gold, white
- Mascot: Klaw
- OrlandoPredators.com

Nickname
- Preds

Team history
- Orlando Predators (1991–2016)

Home fields
- Amway Arena (1991–2010); Amway Center (2011–2013, 2015–2016); CFE Arena (2014)

League / conference affiliations
- Arena Football League (1991–2016): National Conference (1993–2008); American Conference (2010–2016); South Division (1992–2015)

Championships
- League championships: 2: 1998, 2000
- Conference championships: 1: 2006; Prior to 2005, the AFL did not have conference championship games
- Division championships: 9: 1992, 1993, 1994, 1997, 2000, 2002, 2006, 2014, 2015

Playoff appearances (23)
- 1992, 1993, 1994, 1995, 1996, 1997, 1998, 1999, 2000, 2001, 2002, 2003, 2004, 2005, 2006, 2007, 2008, 2010, 2011, 2013, 2014, 2015, 2016

The Orlando Predators were a professional arena football team based in Orlando, Florida and member of the Arena Football League (AFL). The team was most recently owned by Orlando Predators LLC, a company owned by David A. Siegel, and played its home games at Amway Center.

The team was founded in 1991 as an expansion team of the AFL. The team advanced to the playoffs 19 consecutive seasons between 1992 and 2011, becoming the ArenaBowl champions in 1998 and 2000 during that span. The team suspended operations after the 2016 season.

== History ==
=== Early years (1991–1997) ===
There was interest in arena football in Orlando as early as 1987, with a group looking to place an AFL team in central Florida in time for the 1988 season. But more than three years would go by until the Orlando Predators franchise was finally secured by Davey Johnson, Tracy Allen and Mike McBath on February 14, 1991. The Preds began play that same year but missed the playoffs, the only time the club would do so until 2012. In just their second season in 1992, they advanced to ArenaBowl VI, only to fall to the Detroit Drive, who won their fourth title in five years. Annually among the league-leaders in attendance, they qualified for the playoffs in 18 consecutive seasons, the longest streak in the original AFL. One noted administrator for the Predators was Pro Football Hall of Fame lineman, Jack Youngblood, who came to the Predators in 1995 as vice-president and then later, president of the organization. He was with the team through the 1999 season.

=== Gruden era / Two titles in four years (1998–2008) ===
For much of their existence in the original AFL, their head coach was Jay Gruden, younger brother of prominent National Football League coach Jon Gruden and who would go on to coach the NFL's Washington Redskins. Jay Gruden was formerly an outstanding Arena Football quarterback, leading the Tampa Bay Storm to four ArenaBowl championships, and then served one year as offensive coordinator for the Nashville Kats prior to becoming head coach of the Predators. Jay was the first quarterback in the AFL Hall of Fame. Orlando won the ArenaBowl in 1998 and 2000 under Gruden's coaching. He then attempted a comeback as a player, but subsequently returned to coaching following the death of his head coach replacement, Fran Papasedero, in a car accident.

The Predators were one of the premier franchises in the history of the original AFL, and had a rivalry with Tampa Bay, who moved to Tampa the same year the Predators formed. They met twice in the ArenaBowl, with Tampa Bay winning in 1995 and Orlando winning in 1998. The rivalry, nicknamed the "War on I-4" after the interstate that connects the two cities, intensified when Gruden took over as Orlando's head coach.

Orlando and Tampa Bay each lasted longer in their markets than any other AFL franchise have, As of 2019. The Predators were unique in that they had played in their previous venue, Amway Arena, for 18 seasons in the AFL, longer than any other team. Amway Arena was often nicknamed "The Jungle" during Predators games due to the hostile environment from the fans, harsh smoke that filled the arena during the players intro, and a Guns N' Roses song which "welcomed" other teams. They shared Amway Arena with the Orlando Magic of the NBA and the Orlando Titans of the NLL. The 2010 season was the Predators' 19th and final season at Amway Arena. The team moved to Amway Center, the new arena in Orlando, for the 2011 season. A Predators game was the final sporting event ever performed at Amway Arena.

The team's mascot was a monster-like human named Klaw who looked much like the alien (Predator) from the Predator films, with only different coloring.

The Predators played in the ArenaBowl a total of seven times. If the Pittsburgh Gladiators' two ArenaBowl games before they moved to Tampa Bay are included, the Storm was the only franchise that played in more (eight; six as the Storm).

During the 2007 season, the Predators inaugurated the "Predator Fan Hall of Fame". The inaugural inductees were Nancy Morris and Richard Grabe. Morris, was a superfan for over 20 years, was known to most of the team and the front office as "The PredMom", and was the president of the Orlando Predator In Your Face Fan Club. Grabe, who also was a superfan (starting in 1991), was the creator of the "PredHeads" that were seen being worn by a select group of fans that sat in section 113 of the old Amway Arena. They were also known for their tailgating parties on "Predator Island" (located in the northeast corner of lot 4 of the Centroplex). After moving to the new Amway Center, the majority of "PredHeads" sat in section 114, and tailgated under I-4 in lot 9.

=== Revival of AFL (2010–2016) ===
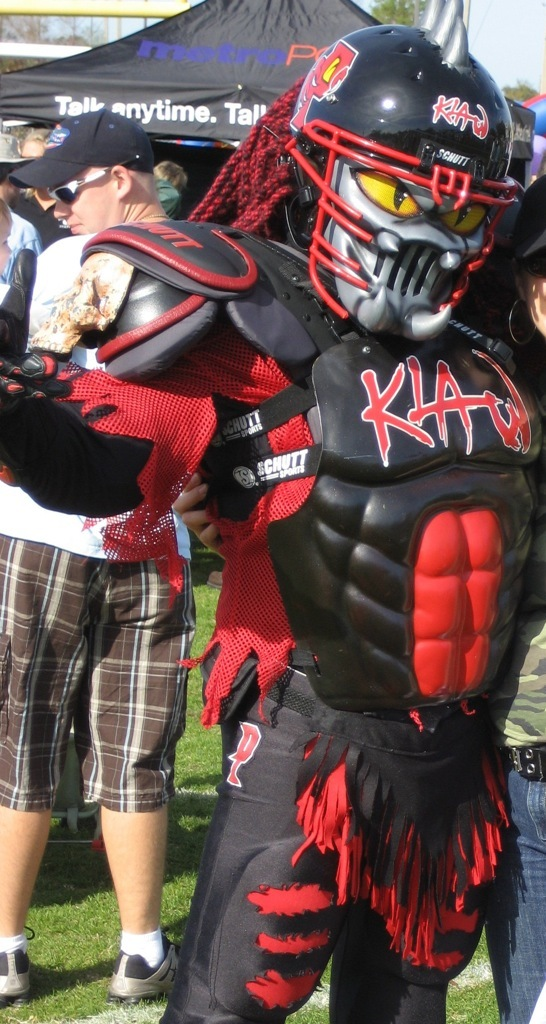
Predators mascot, Klaw, in 2007

The Predators maintained their organization and web presence after the AFL suspended operations in August 2009. On September 28, 2009, the Predators announced their return to play for the 2010 season as a member of the new Arena Football 1 league, until that league purchased the AFL's assets and assumed the AFL's history. With Jay Gruden obligated to the UFL by his contract with the Tuskers, eventually becoming the team's head coach, they hired former quarterback Pat O'Hara as their head coach for the 2010 season. When the schedule for the league's season was announced on December 31, 2009, the Predators were slated to return to action on April 9, 2010. In the 2010 season, the Predators finished with an 8–8 record. They qualified for the playoffs, but lost the conference championship to the Tampa Bay Storm by a single point as a last-second field goal attempt was unsuccessful.

In 2011, the Predators finished the regular season 11–7, but fell to the Jacksonville Sharks in the conference semifinals by a score of 63–48.

With a 4–14 record in 2012 under first-year head coach Bret Munsey, the Predators missed the playoffs for the first time since their inaugural season in 1991. Following the end of the season, Munsey was released as head coach.

Under Doug Plank for the 2013 season, the Predators lost their first five games of the season. It was then that the team acquired veteran quarterback Aaron Garcia in a trade with the San Jose SaberCats. The Predators went on to win seven of their remaining thirteen games following the trade to finish the season with a 7–11 record, which was good enough to clinch a playoff berth. However, they were eliminated in the conference semifinals by the Philadelphia Soul. With two weeks remaining during the regular season, Brett Bouchy sold his controlling interest in the team to The Pearsall Holdings LP for an undisclosed amount. Plank retired following the season.

The Predators moved to CFE Arena on the campus of the University of Central Florida in 2014, after the Amway Center informed the team that they had defaulted on their lease for failing to meet attendance requirements. On December 25, 2013, the Predators announced that Rob Keefe would become the seventh coach in franchise history. In May 2014, it was announced that majority owner David Pearsall had sold the team to an undisclosed ownership group, but the team was taken over by the AFL. In July 2014, reports began to surface that David A. Siegel had purchased the franchise with the intent to move the team back into the Amway Center. On July 15, 2014, Siegel confirmed his purchase of the Predators.

On December 8, 2014, the Predators suspended head coach Rob Keefe with pay while an investigation was ongoing by the Orange County Sheriff's Office into accusations of domestic violence. The charges were since dropped.

During the week of June 18, 2016, the entire Arena Football League, including the hometown Predators, displayed patches and stickers "ORL" as a remembrance of the victims killed in the Pulse Nightclub massacre.

On October 12, 2016, the Orlando Predators announced they had suspended operations due to the reduced number of teams in the AFL and other pending disagreements with the league.

=== Revival in the National Arena League (2019) ===
In 2019, former Predator Kenny McEntyre launched a new Predators team in the National Arena League. This Predators team would join the third incarnation of the Arena Football League in July 2023 with intent to play in 2024.

=== Predator highlights ===
The Predators made Arena Football League history in consecutive weeks during the 1992 season:

- On June 13, 1992, the team defeated the San Antonio Force 50–0. San Antonio kicker Matt Frantz missed six field goals. This is the first game shutout in the history of indoor football. Although there have been shutouts in af2 and other indoor football leagues, it proved to be the only shutout ever recorded in the original AFL.
- On Friday, June 19, 1992, in a Week 4 road game against the Detroit Drive, quarterback Ben Bennett and the Predators trailed 42–32 with only 49 seconds left. In a miraculous feat of strength, wide receiver / defensive back Barry Wagner would catch two touchdown passes, get two two-point conversions, recover an onside kick, and make a game-ending tackle. With a safety added in, Orlando would win, 50–49. The comeback would become known as "The Miracle Minute". On the AFL's 20 Greatest Highlights Countdown, this comeback ranked #1.

== Players ==
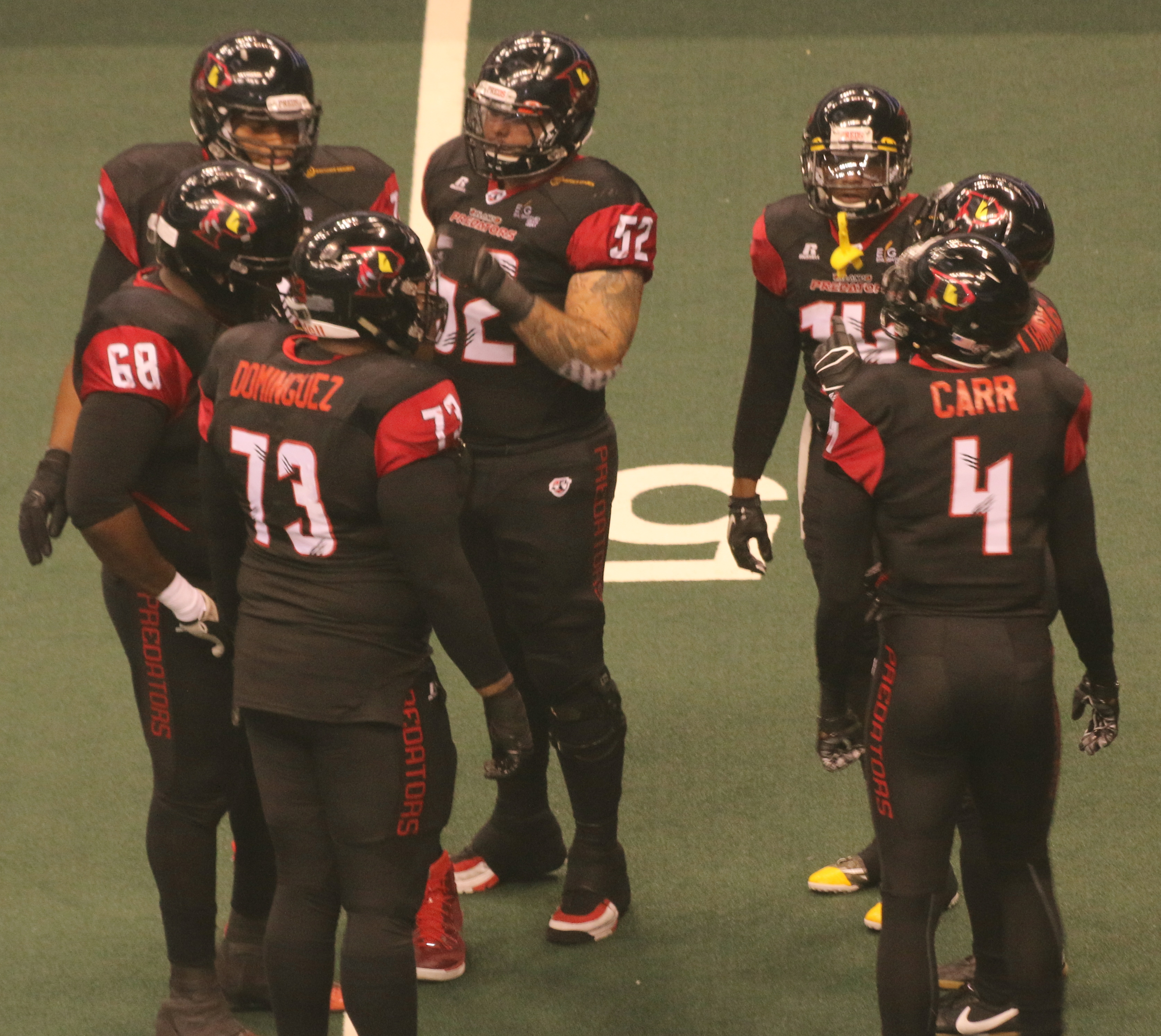
The Predators in 2015

=== Arena Football Hall of Fame members ===
Orlando Predators Hall of Fame members
No.	Name	Year inducted	Position(s)	Years with Predators
84	Carl Aikens Jr.	2000	WR/DB	1992–1993
5	Ben Bennett	2000	QB	1991–1995
7	Jay Gruden	1999	QB	2002–2003
–	Perry Moss	2000	Head coach	1991–1997
29	Durwood Roquemore	1999	WR/DB	1991–1996
??	Reggie Smith	2002	WR/DB	1991
??	Stevie Thomas	2011	WR/LB	2000
82	Barry Wagner	2011	WR/DB	1992–1997, 2007
22	Herkie Walls	2000	WR/DB	1991–1996

=== Individual awards ===
AFL MVP
Season	Player	Position
1995	Barry Wagner	WR/DB

AFL Offensive Player of the Year
Season	Player	Position
1997	Barry Wagner	WR/DB

AFL Defensive Player of the Year
Season	Player	Position
2000	Kenny McEntyre	DS
2001	Kenny McEntyre	DS
2004	Kenny McEntyre	DS
2007	Greg White	DL

AFL Rookie of the Year
Season	Player	Position
2003	Travis McGriff	OS

Ironman of the Year
Season	Player	Position
1992	Barry Wagner	WR/DB
1993	Barry Wagner	WR/DB
1994	Barry Wagner	WR/DB
1995	Barry Wagner	WR/DB
1996	Barry Wagner	WR/DB
1997	Barry Wagner	WR/DB
2004	Cory Fleming	WR/LB

ArenaBowl MVP winners
ArenaBowl	Player	Position
XII	Rick Hamilton	FB/LB
XIV	Connell Maynor	QB

Al Lucas Hero Award
Season	Player	Position
2006	Kenny McEntyre	DS
2011	Kenny McEntyre	DS

Lineman of the Year
Season	Player	Position
2007	Greg White	DL

Kicker Player of the Year
Season	Player	Position
2004	Jay Taylor	K

=== All-Arena players ===
The following Predators players were named to All-Arena teams:

- QB Ben Bennett (2), Joe Hamilton (1)
- FB/LB Paul McGowan (2), Rick Hamilton (1), Rupert Grant (1)
- WR T. T. Toliver (1), Greg Carr (1), Brandon Thompkins (1)
- WR/DB Barry Wagner (6), Bret Cooper (1)
- WR/LB Cory Fleming (2)
- DL Greg White (1), Daryl Cato-Bishop (1)
- OL/DL Webbie Burnett (1), Rusty Russell (1), Victor Hall (1), Rich McKenzie (1), B. J. Cohen (1), Ernest Allen (3), Jermaine Smith (1), E. J. Burt (1), Henry Taylor (1)
- LB Marlon Moye-Moore (1), Tanner Varner (1), Terence Moore (2)
- DB Kenny McEntyre (2), Rayshaun Kizer (2), Varmah Sonie (1)
- K Jorge Cimadevilla (2), Jay Taylor (1), Carlos Martinez, Mark Lewis (2)
- DS Durwood Roquemore (3), Chris Barber (2), Kenny McEntyre (6), Damon Mason (2)
- OS/KR Herkie Walls (1)
- KR Dominic Jones (1), Brandon Thompkins (2)

=== All-Ironman players ===
The following Predators players were named to All-Ironman teams:

- FB/LB Marlon Moye-Moore (2)
- WR/DB Barry Wagner (1)
- WR/LB Barry Wagner (1), Cory Fleming (2)
- OL/DL B. J. Cohen (1), Reggie Lee (1)

=== All-Rookie players ===
The following Predators players were named to All-Rookie teams:

- QB Craig Whelihan
- FB Odie Armstrong
- FB/LB Rick Hamilton
- WR/DB Javarus Dudley
- WR/LB Thabiti Davis
- OL/DL Connell Spain, E. J. Burt, Greg White
- OL Bobby Harris
- LB Lance Mitchell
- DB Rayshun Reed, Ahmad Carroll
- OS Siaha Burley, Travis McGriff
- K Nick Gatto, Jay Taylor

== Head coaches ==
Name	Term	Regular season				Playoffs		Awards
Name	Term	W	L	T	Win%	W	L	Awards
Perry Moss	1991–1997	59	25	0	.702	8	8	1992 & 1994 AFL Coach of the Year
Jay Gruden	1998–2001, 2004–2008	82	54	0	.603	11	7	
Fran Papasedero	2002–2003	19	11	0	.633	3	2	
Pat O'Hara	2010–2011	19	15	0	.559	1	2	
Bret Munsey	2012	4	14	0	.222	0	0	
Doug Plank	2013	7	11	0	.389	0	1	
Rob Keefe	2014–2016	35	17	0	.673	1	3	

== Season-by-season ==
ArenaBowl champions	ArenaBowl appearance	Division champions	Playoff berth

Season	League	Conference	Division	Regular season			Postseason results
Season	League	Conference	Division	Finish	Wins	Losses	Postseason results
Orlando Predators
1991	AFL	—	—	7th	3	7	
1992	AFL	—	Southern	1st	9	1	Won Quarterfinals (Cleveland) 50–12; Won Semifinals (Tampa Bay) 24–21 (OT); Lost ArenaBowl VI (Detroit) 38–56
1993	AFL	National	—	1st	10	2	Won Quarterfinals (Miami) 41–13; Lost Semifinals (Tampa Bay) 52–55
1994	AFL	National	—	1st	11	1	Won Quarterfinals (Fort Worth) 34–14; Won Semifinals (Massachusetts) 51–42; Lost ArenaBowl VIII (Arizona) 38–56
1995	AFL	National	Southern	2nd	7	5	Won Quarterfinals (San Jose) 55–37; Won Semifinals (Iowa) 56–49; Lost ArenaBowl IX (Tampa Bay) 35–48
1996	AFL	National	Southern	2nd	9	5	Lost Quarterfinals (Arizona) 48–65
1997	AFL	National	Southern	1st	10	4	Won Quarterfinals (New Jersey) 45–37; Lost Semifinals (Iowa) 34–52
1998	AFL	National	Southern	2nd	9	5	Won Quarterfinals (Nashville) 58–43; Won Semifinals (Arizona) 38–33; Won ArenaBowl XII (Tampa Bay) 62–31
1999	AFL	National	Southern	3rd	7	7	Won Quarterfinals (Tampa Bay) 41–19; Won Semifinals (Iowa) 48–41; Lost ArenaBowl XIII (Albany) 48–59
2000	AFL	National	Southern	1st	11	3	Won Quarterfinals (Tampa Bay) 34–24; Won Semifinals (Arizona) 56–44; Won ArenaBowl XIV (Nashville) 41–38
2001	AFL	National	Southern	3rd	8	6	Lost Wild Card Round (Chicago) 41–26
2002	AFL	National	Southern	1st	7	7	Won Wild Card Round (Buffalo) 32–27; Won Quarterfinals (New Jersey) 49–46; Lost Semifinals (San Jose) 40–52
2003	AFL	National	Southern	2nd	12	4	Won Quarterfinals (New York) 69–62; Lost Semifinals (Tampa Bay) 50–60
2004	AFL	National	Southern	2nd	10	6	Lost Conference Semifinals (Chicago) 49–59
2005	AFL	National	Southern	2nd	10	6	Won Conference Semifinals (New York) 47–42; Lost Conference Championship (Georgia) 58–60
2006	AFL	National	Southern	1st	10	6	Won Conference Semifinals (Philadelphia) 31–27; Won Conference Championship (Dallas) 45–28; Lost ArenaBowl XX (Chicago) 61–69
2007	AFL	National	Southern	3rd	8	8	Lost Wild Card Round (Philadelphia) 26–42
2008	AFL	National	Southern	2nd	9	7	Lost Wild Card Round (Cleveland) 66–69
2009	The AFL suspended operations for the 2009 season.						
2010	AFL	American	South	3rd	8	8	Won Conference Semifinals (Jacksonville) 73–69; Lost Conference Championship (Tampa Bay) 62–63
2011	AFL	American	South	3rd	11	7	Lost Conference Semifinals (Jacksonville) 48–63
2012	AFL	American	South	5th	4	14	
2013	AFL	American	South	2nd	7	11	Lost Conference Semifinals (Philadelphia) 55–59
2014	AFL	American	South	1st	11	7	Won Conference Semifinals (Pittsburgh) 56–48; Lost Conference Championship (Cleveland) 46–56
2015	AFL	American	South	1st	12	6	Lost Conference Semifinals (Jacksonville) 33–55
2016	AFL	American	—	2nd	12	4	Lost Conference Semifinals (Jacksonville) 68–69 (OT)
Total					225	147	(includes only regular season)
Total					24	21	(includes only the postseason)
Total					249	168	(includes both regular season and postseason)
