= 1996 Tampa Bay Storm season =

Arena Football League team season

- Head coach: Tim Marcum
- Home stadium: ThunderDome

Results
- Record: 12–2
- Division place: 1st, Southern
- Playoffs: W Quarterfinals vs. Anaheim; W Semifinals vs. Arizona; W ArenaBowl X vs. Iowa

The 1996 Tampa Bay Storm season was the tenth season for the Tampa Bay Storm. They finished the 1996 Arena Football League season 12–2 and finished the season with the franchise's second consecutive, and fourth overall, ArenaBowl championship.

== Schedule ==
=== Regular season ===
Week	Date	Opponent	Results		Game site (attendance)
Week	Date	Opponent	Final score	Team record	Game site (attendance)
1	April 26	at St. Louis Stampede	W 57–38	1–0	Kiel Center (6,335)
2	Bye				
3	May 11	Texas Terror	W 62–27	2–0	ThunderDome (14,178)
4	May 18	Orlando Predators	W 63–42	3–0	ThunderDome (16,444)
5	May 24	at Minnesota Fighting Pike	W 41–16	4–0	Target Center (7,781)
6	June 1	San Jose SaberCats	W 36–22	5–0	ThunderDome (14,663)
7	June 8	Florida Bobcats	W 55–47	6–0	ThunderDome (14,117)
8	June 15	at Anaheim Piranhas	W 34–28	7–0	Arrowhead Pond of Anaheim (14,102)
9	June 22	at Memphis Pharaohs	W 43–12	8–0	Pyramid Arena (3,363)
10	June 29	Charlotte Rage	L 53–66	8–1	ThunderDome (15,492)
11	July 6	at Florida Bobcats	W 39–36	9–1	West Palm Beach Auditorium (3,363)
12	July 12	Albany Firebirds	W 65–52 (OT)	10–1	ThunderDome (13,202)
13	July 19	at Orlando Predators	L 39–40	10–2	Orlando Arena (16,236)
14	July 27	Arizona Rattlers	W 69–48	11–2	ThunderDome (12,345)
15	August 2	at Texas Terror	W 42–30	12–2	Compaq Center (9,750)

=== Playoffs ===
The Storm were awarded the No. 2 seed in the AFL playoffs.

Round	Date	Opponent	Results		Game site (attendance)
Round	Date	Opponent	Final score	Playoff record	Game site (attendance)
Quarterfinals	August 9	(7) Anaheim Piranhas	W 30–16	1–0	ThunderDome (13,021)
Semifinals	August 17	(3) Arizona Rattlers	W 55–54	2–0	ThunderDome (13,572)
ArenaBowl	August 26	at (1) Iowa Barnstormers	W 42–38	3–0	Veterans Memorial Auditorium (11,411)

== Standings ==
Team	Overall			Division		
Team	Wins	Losses	Percentage	Wins	Losses	Percentage
National Conference
Eastern Division
Albany Firebirds	10	4	0.714	4	0	1.000
Charlotte Rage	5	9	0.357	2	2	0.500
Connecticut Coyotes	2	12	0.143	0	4	0.000
Southern Division
Tampa Bay Storm	12	2	0.857	5	1	0.833
Orlando Predators	9	5	0.643	5	1	0.833
Florida Bobcats	6	8	0.429	2	4	0.333
Texas Terror	1	13	0.071	0	6	0.000
American Conference
Central Division
Iowa Barnstormers	12	2	0.857	4	2	0.667
Milwaukee Mustangs	10	4	0.714	5	1	0.833
St. Louis Stampede	8	6	0.571	3	3	0.500
Memphis Pharaohs	0	14	0.000	0	6	0.000
Western Division
Arizona Rattlers	11	3	0.786	3	2	0.600
Anaheim Piranhas	9	5	0.643	4	1	0.800
San Jose SaberCats	6	8	0.429	1	4	0.200
Minnesota Fighting Pike	4	10	0.286	1	2	0.333

- Green indicates clinched playoff berth
- Blue indicates division champion
- Grey indicates best regular season record

== Awards ==
Position	Player	Award	All-Arena team
Offensive/defensive lineman	Kent Wells	Lineman of the Year	1st
Wide receiver/linebacker	Stevie Thomas	-	2nd
Offensive/defensive lineman	Sylvester Bembery	-	2nd
Defensive specialist	Tracey Perkins	-	2nd
