= Lamart Cooper =

American football player (born 1973)

No. 9, 4, 1
- Position: Offensive specialist

Personal information
- Born: December 2, 1973 (age 52); Miami, Florida, U.S.
- Listed height: 5 ft 7 in (1.70 m)
- Listed weight: 170 lb (77 kg)

Career information
- High school: Palmetto (Pinecrest, Florida)
- College: Antelope Valley (1991–1992); Wayne State (1994–1995)
- NFL draft: 1996: undrafted

Career history
- Iowa Barnstormers (1996–1998); Milwaukee Mustangs (1999–2000); Oklahoma Wranglers (2001); Buffalo Destroyers (2002)

Awards and highlights
- Second-team All-Arena (1997); 2× Don't Blink! Player of the Year (2000, 2001)

Career AFL statistics
- Receptions: 433
- Receiving yards: 5,678
- Receiving TDs: 82
- Return yards: 7,587
- Return TDs: 24
- Stats at ArenaFan.com

Lamart Travelle Cooper (born December 2, 1973), also known as Lamont Cooper, is an American former professional football player who was an offensive specialist in the Arena Football League (AFL) with the Iowa Barnstormers, Milwaukee Mustangs, Oklahoma Wranglers, and Buffalo Destroyers. He played college football at Wayne State College, where he was also a national champion in track. He played for the Barnstormers from 1996 to 1998, advancing to two ArenaBowls and earning second-team All-Arena honors in 1997. Cooper was a two-time winner of the AFL's Don't Blink! Player of the Year award, given to the league's most exciting player. In 2001, he set single-season AFL records in all-purpose yards, kick returns, and kick return yards. He retired with the most kick return touchdowns in league history.

== Early life ==
Lamart Travelle Cooper was born on December 2, 1973, in Miami, Florida. He was a letterman in football, wrestling, and track at Miami Palmetto Senior High School in Pinecrest, Florida. He graduated in 1991.

== College career ==
Coming out of high school, Cooper was ignored by college recruiters due to his small size (5 feet 6 inches (1.68 m) and 145 pounds (66 kg)). He enrolled at Antelope Valley College, a junior college in California. His high school coach had previously talked to Antelope Valley head coach Brent Carder about Cooper. Carder later stated he told Cooper's coach he "didn't think it would be a good idea for a 5-6 wide receiver to come all the way from Florida." On the first day of practice, Cooper impressed Carder with a 4.28 second 40-yard dash. During the 1991 season, he led the team in all-purpose yards with 1,021, earning first-team All-Foothill Conference honors as a kick returner. Cooper played receiver, running back, and quarterback in 1992, spending time at each position during every game that year. He finished the 1992 season with 1,552 all-purpose yards, including 833 receiving yards and 295 rushing yards, garnering Foothill MVP recognition. He scored two touchdowns in the K-Swiss Bowl, helping Antelope Valley beat Glendale Community College by a score of 24–23. Cooper was named the California junior college player of the year for his performance during the 1992 season. His 50 career receptions and 1,128 receiving yards were both school records. Cooper was also used as a kick returner while at Antelope Valley.

After sitting out the 1993 season, Cooper transferred to play for the Wayne State Wildcats of Wayne, Nebraska, in 1994. He started all ten games at wide receiver as a senior in 1995, catching 54 passes for 766 yards and eight touchdowns. He also had a school record 95-yard kick return touchdown and tied a school record with an 87-yard punt return touchdown. Cooper played in 18 total games during his two years at Wayne State, catching 76 passes for 1,067 yards and 12 touchdowns. He also participated in track at Wayne State. During the spring 1995 indoor track season, Cooper set a school record in the 55-meter dash with 6.26 seconds. He also finished third at the NCAA Division II nationals with a time of 6.29, earning All-American honors. He was the Division II 55-meter indoor champion in March 1996 with a time of 6.30 seconds, becoming Wayne State's first-ever national champion in any sport. He majored in sports management at Wayne State.

== Professional career ==
=== Iowa Barnstormers ===
Cooper received a tryout with the Iowa Barnstormers of the Arena Football League (AFL) after Wayne State athletic director Pete Chapman, who was friends with Barnstormers head coach John Gregory, told Gregory about Cooper. Cooper was then invited to a one-day tryout with the Barnstormers, where he ran a 4.34 40-yard dash. He was the only player the team signed from the tryout that day. He was originally pegged as an offensive specialist but before the start of the season Gregory said that Cooper would also play defensive back, a position he had never played before. The AFL played under ironman rules, meaning most players were required to play both offense and defense. In regards to Cooper's small size at 5 feet 7 inches (1.70 m) and 170 pounds (77 kg), Gregory stated "In our game (arena football), what we look for is speed. We don't give a damn how tall they are." Cooper was initially on the team's practice squad but was promoted to the active roster before the start of the season due to starting inside receiver Ryan Murray having suffered an ankle injury. Cooper was the only rookie to make the team that year. After Murray returned, Cooper was moved to starting outside receiver. On July 6 against the Milwaukee Mustangs, Cooper caught five passes for 97 yards and three touchdowns while also posting one interception in a 66–64 victory, earning AFL Ironman of the Week honors. Cooper played in all 14 games overall during the 1996 season, totaling 35 receptions for 559 yards and ten touchdowns on offense and 17 solo tackles, six assisted tackles, two interceptions, and two pass breakups on defense. The Barnstormers finished the year with a 12–2 record and advanced to ArenaBowl X, where they faced the Tampa Bay Storm. With under four minutes remaining in the game and the ball at Tampa Bay's 23-yard line, Cooper caught a pass from Kurt Warner, and after following a block from Willis Jacox, made it to the one-yard line where he was hit by the Storm's Tracey Perkins. Cooper fell into the end zone for an apparent touchdown but was controversially ruled out at the one-yard line. Iowa then failed to score from the one-yard line on the next four plays and lost the game by a score of 42–38. Cooper had seven catches for 115 yards and one touchdown overall in the ArenaBowl.

During the 1996 offseason, Cooper worked out with Arizona Rattlers receiver/linebacker and future AFL Hall of Famer Hunkie Cooper. They both happened to live in the Las Vegas area at the time. They are not related. Lamart said Hunkie "had me working out so hard some days my legs just burned for hours." Lamart played in all 14 games for the second straight season in 1997, recording 83 catches for 1,186 yards and 21 touchdowns, 19 solo tackles, three assisted tackles, four pass breakups, and 37 kick returns for 708 yards and three touchdowns. He was named second-team All-Arena as an offensive specialist after leading the team in all-purpose yards and receiving. The Barnstormers finished the 1997 season 11–3 and advanced to the ArenaBowl for the second consecutive year, this time losing in ArenaBowl XI to the Rattlers by a score of 55–33.

Cooper moved to offensive specialist permanently in 1998. He was placed on injured reserve on May 29, 1998, and later activated on July 10, 1998. He appeared in nine games overall during the 1998 season, catching 26 passes for 317 yards and four touchdowns while also returning 38 kicks for 695 yards as Iowa went 5–9.

=== Milwaukee Mustangs ===
On March 1, 1999, Cooper was traded to the Milwaukee Mustangs for defensive specialist Kwame Ellis. Cooper played in 13 games for the Mustangs during the 1999 season but also had his playing time limited by injuries. He finished the year catching 21 passes for 205 yards and one touchdown while returning 33 kicks for 765 yards and four touchdowns. Milwaukee went 7–7 and lost in the first round of the playoffs to Cooper's former team, the Barnstormers, by a margin of 66–34.

Cooper played in all 14 games in 2000, recording 77 receptions for 943 yards and 13 touchdowns, and 87 kick returns for 1,813 yards and seven touchdowns. His seven return touchdowns was tied for the most in AFL history. For his performance during the 2000 season, he won the AFL's Don't Blink! Player of the Year award, given to the league's most exciting player. Milwaukee finished 7–7 for the second straight year and lost in the first round of the playoffs again, this time to the Storm 72–64. After the 2000 season, Cooper stated "I felt like I didn't do a whole lot on offense. I wasn't used as much as I should've been."

=== Oklahoma Wranglers ===
Cooper signed with the Oklahoma Wranglers of the AFL on December 8, 2000. He reportedly could have made more money elsewhere in the AFL but decided to sign an incentive-heavy deal to play for Wranglers head coach Bob Cortese, whose offense heavily utilized specialists. Cooper appeared in all 14 games for the Wranglers during the 2001 season, totaling a career-high 111 receptions for 1,418 yards and 22 touchdowns, 92 kick returns for 1,951 yards and six touchdowns, and 15 rushes for 70 yards and one touchdown. He set single-season AFL records in all-purpose yards, kick returns, and kick return yards. He won the Don't Blink! Player of the Year award for the second year in a row. Despite Cooper's strong season, Oklahoma finished with a 5–9 record.

=== Buffalo Destroyers ===
On December 18, 2001, it was announced that Cooper had signed with the AFL's Buffalo Destroyers. Cooper played in 13 games, all starts, for Buffalo in 2002, accumulating 80 catches for 1,050 yards and 11 touchdowns, 79 kick returns for 1,649 yards and four touchdowns, and 27 rushing attempts for 47 yards and five touchdowns. The Destroyers went 6–8 and lost in the first round to the Orlando Predators by a score of 32–27. Cooper announced his retirement in December 2002. He finished his AFL career with totals of 91 games played, 433 receptions for 5,678 yards and 82 touchdowns, 367 kick returns for 7,587 yards and 24 touchdowns, 58 rushes for 127 yards and six touchdowns, 45 solo tackles, 11 assisted tackles, two interceptions, and six pass breakups. His 24 kick return touchdowns were the most in league history at the time. They are still second most all-time behind Sedrick Robinson's 30 scores.

== Personal life ==
Cooper is listed on Kurt Warner's Pro Football Hall of Fame appreciation page.
