= 1996 Albany Firebirds season =

Arena Football League team season

- Head coach: Mike Hohensee
- Home stadium: Knickerbocker Arena

Results
- Record: 10–4
- Division place: 1st, Eastern
- Playoffs: W Quarterfinals vs. Milwaukee; L Semifinals vs. Iowa

The 1996 Albany Firebirds season was the seventh season for the Albany Firebirds. They finished the 1996 Arena Football League season 10–4 and finished the season with a loss in the semifinals of the playoffs to the Iowa Barnstormers.

== Schedule ==
=== Regular season ===
Week	Date	Opponent	Results		Game site (attendance)
Week	Date	Opponent	Final score	Team record	Game site (attendance)
1	Bye				
2	May 4	Charlotte Rage	W 63–32	1–0	Knickerbocker Arena (13,029)
3	May 10	at San Jose SaberCats	L 40–69	1–1	San Jose Arena (15,561)
4	May 18	Minnesota Fighting Pike	W 85–30	2–1	Knickerbocker Arena (11,712)
5	May 24	at Connecticut Coyotes	W 58–26	3–1	Hartford Civic Center (7,539)
6	June 1	St. Louis Stampede	L 56–66	3–2	Knickerbocker Arena (12,015)
7	June 8	Memphis Pharaohs	W 67–21	4–2	Knickerbocker Arena (11,764)
8	June 15	at Iowa Barnstormers	L 46–55	4–3	Veterans Memorial Auditorium (11,411)
9	June 21	at Charlotte Rage	W 88–36	5–3	Charlotte Coliseum (6,898)
10	June 29	Connecticut Coyotes	W 59–45	6–3	Knickerbocker Arena (11,117)
11	July 6	Orlando Predators	W 53–41	7–3	Knickerbocker Arena (11,079)
12	July 12	at Tampa Bay Storm	L 52–65 (OT)	7–4	ThunderDome (13,202)
13	July 20	at Florida Bobcats	W 66–63	8–4	West Palm Beach Auditorium (3,601)
14	July 27	Texas Terror	W 86–24	9–4	Knickerbocker Arena (12,345)
15	August 2	at Milwaukee Mustangs	W 54–49	10–4	Bradley Center (16,411)

=== Playoffs ===
The Firebirds were awarded the No. 4 seed in the AFL playoffs.

Round	Date	Opponent	Results		Game site (attendance)
Round	Date	Opponent	Final score	Playoff record	Game site (attendance)
Quarterfinals	August 10	(5) Milwaukee Mustangs	W 70–58	1–0	Knickerbocker Arena (11,613)
Semifinals	August 17	at (1) Iowa Barnstormers	L 55–62	1–1	Veterans Memorial Auditorium (11,411)

== Standings ==
Team	Overall			Division		
Team	Wins	Losses	Percentage	Wins	Losses	Percentage
National Conference
Eastern Division
Albany Firebirds	10	4	0.714	4	0	1.000
Charlotte Rage	5	9	0.357	2	2	0.500
Connecticut Coyotes	2	12	0.143	0	4	0.000
Southern Division
Tampa Bay Storm	12	2	0.857	5	1	0.833
Orlando Predators	9	5	0.643	5	1	0.833
Florida Bobcats	6	8	0.429	2	4	0.333
Texas Terror	1	13	0.071	0	6	0.000
American Conference
Central Division
Iowa Barnstormers	12	2	0.857	4	2	0.667
Milwaukee Mustangs	10	4	0.714	5	1	0.833
St. Louis Stampede	8	6	0.571	3	3	0.500
Memphis Pharaohs	0	14	0.000	0	6	0.000
Western Division
Arizona Rattlers	11	3	0.786	3	2	0.600
Anaheim Piranhas	9	5	0.643	4	1	0.800
San Jose SaberCats	6	8	0.429	1	4	0.200
Minnesota Fighting Pike	4	10	0.286	1	2	0.333

- Green indicates clinched playoff berth
- Blue indicates division champion
- Grey indicates best regular season record

== Awards ==
Position	Player	Award	All-Arena team
Offensive specialist	Eddie Brown	Offensive Player of the Year	1st
Wide receiver/defensive back	David McLeod	Defensive Player of the Year	2nd
Kicker	Pete Elezovic	Kicker of the Year	2nd
Quarterback	Mike Perez	-	2nd
Offensive/defensive lineman	Jerome Brown	-	2nd
