= 1996 Texas Terror season =

Arena Football League team season

- Head coach: John Paul Young
- Home stadium: Compaq Center

Results
- Record: 1–13
- Division place: 4th, Southern
- Playoffs: Did not make playoffs

The 1996 Texas Terror season was the first season for the Texas Terror. They finished the 1996 Arena Football League season 1–13 and were one of four teams in the National Conference to miss the playoffs.

== Regular season ==
=== Schedule ===
Week	Date	Opponent	Results		Game site (attendance)
Week	Date	Opponent	Final score	Team record	Game site (attendance)
1	April 27	Minnesota Fighting Pike	L 24–36	0–1	Compaq Center (11,501)
2	May 3	at Orlando Predators	L 36–52	0–2	Orlando Arena (14,678)
3	May 11	at Tampa Bay Storm	L 27–62	0–3	ThunderDome (14,178)
4	May 17	Anaheim Piranhas	L 20–49	0–4	Compaq Center (10,135)
5	May 24	at Milwaukee Mustangs	L 22–62	0–5	Bradley Center (16,471)
6	Bye				
7	June 8	San Jose SaberCats	L 24–42	0–6	Compaq Center (9,132)
8	June 15	at Charlotte Rage	L 15–31	0–7	Charlotte Coliseum (6,359)
9	June 22	at Florida Bobcats	L 26–50	0–8	West Palm Beach Auditorium (3,970)
10	June 29	Orlando Predators	L 37–45	0–9	Compaq Center (8,064)
11	July 3	Arizona Rattlers	L 48–74	0–10	Compaq Center (6,851)
12	July 13	Florida Bobcats	L 34–49	0–11	Compaq Center (7,607)
13	July 19	at Minnesota Fighting Pike	W 54–51	1–11	Target Center (7,380)
14	July 27	at Albany Firebirds	L 24–86	1–12	Knickerbocker Arena (12,345)
15	August 2	Tampa Bay Storm	L 30–42	1–13	Compaq Center (9,750)

== Standings ==
Team	Overall			Division		
Team	Wins	Losses	Percentage	Wins	Losses	Percentage
National Conference
Eastern Division
Albany Firebirds	10	4	0.714	4	0	1.000
Charlotte Rage	5	9	0.357	2	2	0.500
Connecticut Coyotes	2	12	0.143	0	4	0.000
Southern Division
Tampa Bay Storm	12	2	0.857	5	1	0.833
Orlando Predators	9	5	0.643	5	1	0.833
Florida Bobcats	6	8	0.429	2	4	0.333
Texas Terror	1	13	0.071	0	6	0.000
American Conference
Central Division
Iowa Barnstormers	12	2	0.857	4	2	0.667
Milwaukee Mustangs	10	4	0.714	5	1	0.833
St. Louis Stampede	8	6	0.571	3	3	0.500
Memphis Pharaohs	0	14	0.000	0	6	0.000
Western Division
Arizona Rattlers	11	3	0.786	3	2	0.600
Anaheim Piranhas	9	5	0.643	4	1	0.800
San Jose SaberCats	6	8	0.429	1	4	0.200
Minnesota Fighting Pike	4	10	0.286	1	2	0.333

- Green indicates clinched playoff berth
- Blue indicates division champion
- Grey indicates best regular season record
