= 1996 Florida Bobcats season =

Arena Football League team season

- Head coach: Jim Jensen
- Home stadium: West Palm Beach Auditorium

Results
- Record: 6–8
- Division place: 3rd, Southern
- Playoffs: Did not make playoffs

The 1996 Florida Bobcats season was the fifth season for the Florida Bobcats, and the first under that name. They finished the 1996 Arena Football League season 6–8 and were one of four teams in the National Conference to miss the playoffs.

== Regular season ==
=== Schedule ===
Week	Date	Opponent	Results		Game site (attendance)
Week	Date	Opponent	Final score	Team record	Game site (attendance)
1	April 26	Connecticut Coyotes	W 55–27	1–0	West Palm Beach Auditorium (4,306)
2	May 5	at Anaheim Piranhas	L 38–50	1–1	Arrowhead Pond of Anaheim (11,882)
3	May 10	at Orlando Predators	L 20–38	1–2	Orlando Arena (16,116)
4	May 18	San Jose SaberCats	L 26–43	1–3	West Palm Beach Auditorium (4,479)
5	May 25	at Arizona Rattlers	L 37–53	1–4	America West Arena (15,505)
6	June 1	at Charlotte Rage	W 51–40	2–4	Charlotte Coliseum (6,688)
7	June 8	at Tampa Bay Storm	L 47–55	2–5	ThunderDome (14,117)
8	June 15	Minnesota Fighting Pike	W 63–28	3–5	West Palm Beach Auditorium (4,450)
9	June 22	Texas Terror	W 50–26	4–5	West Palm Beach Auditorium (3,970)
10	Bye				
11	July 6	Tampa Bay Storm	L 36–39	4–6	West Palm Beach Auditorium (3,663)
12	July 13	at Texas Terror	W 49–34	5–6	Compaq Center (7,607)
13	July 20	Albany Firebirds	L 63–66	5–7	West Palm Beach Auditorium (3,601)
14	July 27	Orlando Predators	L 27–59	5–8	West Palm Beach Auditorium (4,018)
15	August 3	at St. Louis Stampede	W 36–35	6–8	Kiel Center (8,752)

== Standings ==
Team	Overall			Division		
Team	Wins	Losses	Percentage	Wins	Losses	Percentage
National Conference
Eastern Division
Albany Firebirds	10	4	0.714	4	0	1.000
Charlotte Rage	5	9	0.357	2	2	0.500
Connecticut Coyotes	2	12	0.143	0	4	0.000
Southern Division
Tampa Bay Storm	12	2	0.857	5	1	0.833
Orlando Predators	9	5	0.643	5	1	0.833
Florida Bobcats	6	8	0.429	2	4	0.333
Texas Terror	1	13	0.071	0	6	0.000
American Conference
Central Division
Iowa Barnstormers	12	2	0.857	4	2	0.667
Milwaukee Mustangs	10	4	0.714	5	1	0.833
St. Louis Stampede	8	6	0.571	3	3	0.500
Memphis Pharaohs	0	14	0.000	0	6	0.000
Western Division
Arizona Rattlers	11	3	0.786	3	2	0.600
Anaheim Piranhas	9	5	0.643	4	1	0.800
San Jose SaberCats	6	8	0.429	1	4	0.200
Minnesota Fighting Pike	4	10	0.286	1	2	0.333

- Green indicates clinched playoff berth
- Blue indicates division champion
- Grey indicates best regular season record
