= John Paul Young (American football) =

American football coach (born 1939)

Profile
- Position: Linebacker

Personal information
- Born: December 31, 1939 (age 86); Dallas, Texas, U.S.

Career information
- High school: Abilene (Abilene, Texas)
- College: Texas Western (1958–1961)
- NFL draft: 1962: undrafted

Career history
- Texas Western (1962–1963) Assistant coach; Jacksonville High (Texas) (1964–1966) Assistant coach; SMU (1967–1968) Assistant coach; Oklahoma State (1969) Assistant coach; Texas A&M (1970–1977) Assistant coach; Houston Oilers (1978) Special teams coach; Houston Oilers (1979–1980) Linebackers and special teams coach; New Orleans Saints (1981–1985) Linebackers coach; New Orleans Saints (1985) Interim defensive coordinator; Kansas City Chiefs (1986) Defensive line coach; Kansas City Chiefs (1987) Defensive coordinator and linebackers coach; Texas Tech (1989–1991) Linebackers coach; Dallas Texans (1992) Head coach; Denver Broncos (1993–1994) Linebackers coach; Texas Terror (1996) Head coach; Frankfurt Galaxy (1997) Linebackers coach
- Coaching profile at Pro Football Reference

John Paul Young (born December 31, 1939) is an American former college and professional football coach. He was the defensive coordinator of the Kansas City Chiefs in 1987. He was also the head coach of the Dallas Texans and Texas Terror of the Arena Football League (AFL).

== Early life and college ==
Young was born in Dallas, Texas, and played high school football at Abilene High School in Abilene, Texas. He played college football for the Texas Western Miners from 1958 to 1961 as a linebacker.

== Coaching career ==
Young began his coaching career as an assistant coach at his alma mater, Texas Western, from 1962 to 1963. He was then an assistant coach at Jacksonville High School in Jacksonville, Texas from 1964 to 1966.

He was an assistant coach for the SMU Mustangs from 1967 to 1968, the Oklahoma State Cowboys in 1969, and the Texas A&M Aggies from 1970 to 1977.

Young became the special teams coach of the Houston Oilers of the National Football League (NFL) in 1978. He served as linebackers and special teams coach for the team from 1979 to 1980.

He was the linebackers coach for the New Orleans Saints of the NFL from 1981 to 1985. Young also served as the interim defensive coordinator for the final four games of the 1985 season.

He joined the NFL's Kansas City Chiefs as defensive line coach in 1986. He was then the team's defensive coordinator and linebackers coach in 1987. He was fired by the Chiefs after the season.

Young then returned to the college ranks and served as the linebackers coach for the Texas Tech Red Raiders from 1989 to 1991.

He was the head coach of the Dallas Texans of the Arena Football League (AFL) in 1992, compiling a regular season record of 5–5 and a postseason record of 1–1.

He was the linebackers coach for the Denver Broncos of the NFL from 1993 to 1994.

Young returned to the AFL in 1996, serving as the head coach of the Texas Terror. The Terror finished the regular season with a 1–13 record.

He was the linebackers coach for the Frankfurt Galaxy of the World League of American Football in 1997.

=== Head coaching record ===
| Team | Year | Regular season | | | | Postseason | | | |
| Team | Year | Won | Lost | Win % | Finish | Won | Lost | Win % | Result |
|---|---|---|---|---|---|---|---|---|---|
| Dallas | 1992 | 5 | 5 | .500 | 1st in Western Division | 1 | 1 | .500 | Lost to Detroit Drive in semifinals |
| Texas | 1996 | 1 | 13 | .071 | 4th in Southern Division | - | - | - | |
| Total | | 6 | 18 | .250 | | 1 | 1 | .500 | |
