= 1996 Connecticut Coyotes season =

Arena Football League team season

- Head coach: Lary Kuharich
- Home stadium: Hartford Civic Center

Results
- Record: 2–12
- Division place: 3rd, Eastern
- Playoffs: Did not make playoffs

The 1996 Connecticut Coyotes season was the second of two seasons for the Connecticut Coyotes. They finished the 1996 Arena Football League season 2–12 and were one of four teams in the National Conference to miss the playoffs.

== Schedule ==
=== Regular season ===
Week	Date	Opponent	Results		Game site (attendance)
Week	Date	Opponent	Final score	Team record	Game site (attendance)
1	April 26	at Florida Bobcats	L 27–55	0–1	West Palm Beach Auditorium (4,306)
2	May 3	Memphis Pharaohs	W 68–34	1–1	Hartford Civic Center (9,049)
3	May 11	at Charlotte Rage	L 31–49	1–2	Charlotte Coliseum (7,866)
4	May 18	at Iowa Barnstormers	L 37–39	1–3	Veterans Memorial Auditorium (10,961)
5	May 24	Albany Firebirds	L 26–58	1–4	Hartford Civic Center (7,539)
6	June 1	Orlando Predators	L 38–45	1–5	Hartford Civic Center (7,342)
7	Bye				
8	June 14	at Milwaukee Mustangs	L 30–59	1–6	Bradley Center (15,710)
9	June 22	San Jose SaberCats	W 39–29	2–6	Hartford Civic Center (8,246)
10	June 29	at Albany Firebirds	L 45–59	2–7	Knickerbocker Arena (11,117)
11	July 5	Minnesota Fighting Pike	L 40–44	2–8	Hartford Civic Center (9,249)
12	July 13	at Arizona Rattlers	L 45–51	2–9	America West Arena (15,505)
13	July 19	Charlotte Rage	L 31–51	2–10	Hartford Civic Center (7,893)
14	July 26	at St. Louis Stampede	L 42–61	2–11	Kiel Center (8,233)
15	August 2	Iowa Barnstormers	L 41–61	2–12	Hartford Civic Center (5,615)

== Standings ==
Team	Overall			Division		
Team	Wins	Losses	Percentage	Wins	Losses	Percentage
National Conference
Eastern Division
Albany Firebirds	10	4	0.714	4	0	1.000
Charlotte Rage	5	9	0.357	2	2	0.500
Connecticut Coyotes	2	12	0.143	0	4	0.000
Southern Division
Tampa Bay Storm	12	2	0.857	5	1	0.833
Orlando Predators	9	5	0.643	5	1	0.833
Florida Bobcats	6	8	0.429	2	4	0.333
Texas Terror	1	13	0.071	0	6	0.000
American Conference
Central Division
Iowa Barnstormers	12	2	0.857	4	2	0.667
Milwaukee Mustangs	10	4	0.714	5	1	0.833
St. Louis Stampede	8	6	0.571	3	3	0.500
Memphis Pharaohs	0	14	0.000	0	6	0.000
Western Division
Arizona Rattlers	11	3	0.786	3	2	0.600
Anaheim Piranhas	9	5	0.643	4	1	0.800
San Jose SaberCats	6	8	0.429	1	4	0.200
Minnesota Fighting Pike	4	10	0.286	1	2	0.333

- Green indicates clinched playoff berth
- Blue indicates division champion
- Grey indicates best regular season record
