= 1996 Orlando Predators season =

Arena Football League team season

- Head coach: Perry Moss
- Home stadium: Orlando Arena

Results
- Record: 9–5
- Division place: 2nd, Southern
- Playoffs: L Quarterfinals vs. Arizona

The 1996 Orlando Predators season was the sixth season for the Orlando Predators. They finished the 1996 Arena Football League season 9–5 and finished the season with a loss in the quarterfinals of the playoffs to the Arizona Rattlers.

== Schedule ==
=== Regular season ===
| Week | Date | Opponent | Results | | Game site (attendance) |
| Week | Date | Opponent | Final score | Team record | Game site (attendance) |
|---|---|---|---|---|---|
| 1 | April 27 | at Arizona Rattlers | L 52–55 | 0–1 | America West Arena (14,939) |
| 2 | May 3 | Texas Terror | W 52–36 | 1–1 | Orlando Arena (14,678) |
| 3 | May 10 | Florida Bobcats | W 38–20 | 2–1 | Orlando Arena (16,116) |
| 4 | May 18 | at Tampa Bay Storm | L 42–63 | 2–2 | ThunderDome (16,444) |
| 5 | May 24 | at San Jose SaberCats | L 25–42 | 2–3 | San Jose Arena (15,470) |
| 6 | June 1 | at Connecticut Coyotes | W 45–38 | 3–3 | Hartford Civic Center (7,342) |
| 7 | June 7 | Charlotte Rage | W 56–47 | 4–3 | Orlando Arena (15,127) |
| 8 | Bye | | | | |
| 9 | June 21 | Iowa Barnstormers | L 50–59 | 4–4 | Orlando Arena (15,613) |
| 10 | June 29 | at Texas Terror | W 45–37 | 5–4 | Compaq Center (8,064) |
| 11 | July 6 | at Albany Firebirds | L 41–53 | 5–5 | Knickerbocker Arena (11,079) |
| 12 | July 12 | Minnesota Fighting Pike | W 56–12 | 6–5 | Orlando Arena (15,107) |
| 13 | July 19 | Tampa Bay Storm | W 40–39 | 7–5 | Orlando Arena (16,236) |
| 14 | July 27 | at Florida Bobcats | W 59–27 | 8–5 | West Palm Beach Auditorium (4,018) |
| 15 | August 2 | Anaheim Piranhas | W 50–44 (OT) | 9–5 | Orlando Arena (16,096) |

=== Playoffs ===
The Predators were awarded the No. 6 seed in the AFL playoffs.

| Round | Date | Opponent | Results | | Game site (attendance) |
| Round | Date | Opponent | Final score | Playoff record | Game site (attendance) |
|---|---|---|---|---|---|
| Quarterfinals | August 10 | at (3) Arizona Rattlers | L 48–65 | 0–1 | America West Center (15,129) |

== Standings ==
| Team | Overall | | | Division | | |
| Team | Wins | Losses | Percentage | Wins | Losses | Percentage |
|---|---|---|---|---|---|---|
National Conference
Eastern Division
| Albany Firebirds | 10 | 4 | 0.714 | 4 | 0 | 1.000 |
| Charlotte Rage | 5 | 9 | 0.357 | 2 | 2 | 0.500 |
| Connecticut Coyotes | 2 | 12 | 0.143 | 0 | 4 | 0.000 |
Southern Division
| Tampa Bay Storm | 12 | 2 | 0.857 | 5 | 1 | 0.833 |
| Orlando Predators | 9 | 5 | 0.643 | 5 | 1 | 0.833 |
| Florida Bobcats | 6 | 8 | 0.429 | 2 | 4 | 0.333 |
| Texas Terror | 1 | 13 | 0.071 | 0 | 6 | 0.000 |
American Conference
Central Division
| Iowa Barnstormers | 12 | 2 | 0.857 | 4 | 2 | 0.667 |
| Milwaukee Mustangs | 10 | 4 | 0.714 | 5 | 1 | 0.833 |
| St. Louis Stampede | 8 | 6 | 0.571 | 3 | 3 | 0.500 |
| Memphis Pharaohs | 0 | 14 | 0.000 | 0 | 6 | 0.000 |
Western Division
| Arizona Rattlers | 11 | 3 | 0.786 | 3 | 2 | 0.600 |
| Anaheim Piranhas | 9 | 5 | 0.643 | 4 | 1 | 0.800 |
| San Jose SaberCats | 6 | 8 | 0.429 | 1 | 4 | 0.200 |
| Minnesota Fighting Pike | 4 | 10 | 0.286 | 1 | 2 | 0.333 |

- Green indicates clinched playoff berth
- Blue indicates division champion
- Grey indicates best regular season record

== Awards ==
| Position | Player | Award | All-Arena team |
|---|---|---|---|
| Wide receiver/defensive back | Barry Wagner | Ironman of the Year | 1st |
