= Michael Baker (American football) =

American football player (born 1970)

No. 6
- Positions: Wide receiver, linebacker

Personal information
- Born: January 8, 1970 (age 56)
- Listed height: 6 ft 1 in (1.85 m)
- Listed weight: 190 lb (86 kg)

Career information
- High school: Camden County (Georgia)
- College: West Virginia
- NFL draft: 1994: undrafted

Career history
- Pittsburgh Steelers (1994)*; London Monarchs (1995); St. Louis Stampede (1996); Albany Firebirds (1997); Grand Rapids Rampage (1998–2002)
- * Offseason or practice squad member only

Awards and highlights
- ArenaBowl champion (2001); Second-team All-Arena (2001); AFL All-Ironman Team (1999); AFL Hero Award (2000)

Career AFL statistics
- Receptions: 530
- Receiving yards: 5,709
- Receiving TDs: 69
- Interceptions: 12
- Total TDs: 82
- Stats at ArenaFan.com

Michael Baker (born January 8, 1970) is an American former professional football player who played seven seasons in the Arena Football League (AFL) with the St. Louis Stampede, Albany Firebirds, and Grand Rapids Rampage. He played college football at West Virginia University, and led the country in punt returns as a senior in 1993. After going undrafted, Baker signed with the Pittsburgh Steelers of the National Football League (NFL) but was released before playing for them. In 1999, the duo of Baker and Rampage teammate Thomas Bailey, dubbed the "Killer B's", became the first receiver duo in AFL history to both catch at least 100 passes in the same season. Baker was also named to the AFL's All-Ironman team for his performance during the 1999 season. In 2001, Baker helped the Rampage win ArenaBowl XV and was named second-team All-Arena. In 2007, he was named the top player in Rampage history. After his retirement as a player, Baker was a coach in the AFL from 2003 to 2008.

== Early life and college ==
Michael Baker was born on January 8, 1970. He attended Camden County High School in Camden County, Georgia. He had offers from several Southern schools, including Clemson and Florida State, but chose West Virginia due to the coaches' honesty.

Baker played college football for the West Virginia Mountaineers of West Virginia University. He was a letterman in 1990, 1991, and 1993. He had to sit out his freshman year in 1989 due to academics. However, he ended up making the Athletic Director's Academic Honor Roll that year. He caught 14 passes for 173 yards and two touchdowns in 1990 while also returning 22 punts for 117 yards and three kicks for 72 yards. In 1991, Baker recorded 12 receptions for 150 yards and 13 kick returns for 228 yards. As a junior in 1992, he totaled three catches for 32 yards, six punt returns for 96 yards, and two kick returns for 51 yards. He suffered a broken foot and ended up taking a redshirt for the 1992 season. Baker caught a career-high 38 passes for 668 yards and five touchdowns his senior year in 1993 while also returning 43 punts for 329 yards and two kicks for 74 yards. His 43 punt returns were the most in the country that year while his 329 punt return yards were the most in the Big East Conference. He also had three rushes for 54 yards as a senior.

== Professional career ==
=== Early career ===
Baker signed with the Pittsburgh Steelers on April 26, 1994, after going undrafted in the 1994 NFL draft. On July 27, 1994, it was reported that Baker had been released by the Steelers.

In February 1995, Baker was selected by the London Monarchs of the World League of American Football (WLAF) in the 1995 WLAF draft. He was a member of the Monarchs during the 1995 season but did not record any statistics.

Baker played in 13 games for the St. Louis Stampede of the Arena Football League (AFL) in 1996, recording 105 receptions for 1,223 yards and 11 touchdowns, 75 kick returns for 1,400 yards and three touchdowns, 15 rushes for 23 yards and one touchdown, two solo tackles, one sack, and two pass breakups. He played both played both offense and defense during his time in the AFL as the league played under ironman rules. He also spent time as an offensive specialist. The Stampede finished the 1996 season with an 8–6 record, and lost in the first round of the playoffs to the Iowa Barnstormers by a score of 52–49.

After the Stampede folded, Baker was selected by the Albany Firebirds in a dispersal draft. He played in all 14 games for Albany in 1997, totaling 73 catches for 709 yards and four touchdowns, 69 kick returns for 1,168 yards, 19 solo tackles, 23 assisted tackles, 0.5 sacks, three interceptions, and one pass breakup as the Firebirds finished 6–8.

=== Grand Rapids Rampage ===
Baker joined the Grand Rapids Rampage of the AFL in 1998. He appeared in 13 games during the 1998 season, catching 71 passes for 875 yards and 13 touchdowns while also returning 51 kicks for 1,025 yards, rushing six times for 35 yards and one touchdown, and posting six solo tackles, two assisted tackles, one forced fumble, one fumble recovery, and one interception that he returned 32 yards for a touchdown. The Rampage went 3–11 in 1998. In 1999, Baker and teammate Thomas Bailey became the first receiver duo in AFL history to both catch at least 100 passes in the same season. Baker and Bailey were named the "Killer B's" during their stint with the Rampage. Baker appeared in 13 games overall during the 1999 season, accumulating 102 receptions for 1,091 yards and 17 touchdowns, 30 kick returns for 528 yards, 18 carries for 40 yards and five touchdowns, 14 solo tackles, 31 assisted tackles, five interceptions, four pass breakups, and one fumble recovery. Baker was named to the AFL All-Ironman Team as a wide receiver/linebacker for his performance during the 1999 season. The Rampage finished the year with an 8–6 record and lost in the semifinals to Baker's former team, the Albany Firebirds.

In 2000, Baker donated money to charity for each touchdown he scored and won the AFL Hero award, given to an AFL player or coach "who has dedicated himself off the field to the improvement of his community and positive promotion of the AFL and its civic initiatives." He played in 12 games overall in 2000, recording 83 catches for 894 yards and nine touchdowns, 45 kick returns for 872 yards and one touchdown, six rushes for three yards and one touchdown, 16 solo tackles, 19 assisted tackles, one interception, two pass breakups, one forced fumble, and one fumble recovery. He missed the last two games of the 2000 season due to a shoulder injury as the team went 6–8 and lost in the first round of the playoffs to the Nashville Kats by a score of 57–14. Baker returned to play in all 14 games in 2001, totaling 77 receptions for 721 yards and 12 touchdowns, 40 kick returns for 749 yards, 25 solo tackles, 24 assisted tackles, two interceptions, and four pass breakups. The Rampage finished the 2001 season with an 11–3 record and advanced to ArenaBowl XV, where they avenged the prior year's playoff loss by defeating the Kats 64–42. Baker was named second-team All-Arena as a wide receiver/linebacker for his performance during the 2001 season, his last full season as a player in the AFL. He re-signed with Grand Rapids on February 26, 2002. He was placed on injured reserve on May 3 with what was originally diagnosed as a bone bruise. However, it was later revealed to be a foot fracture. In June 2002, Baker became the first player in team history to have his own bobblehead. He was activated from injured reserve on June 21, 2002. Overall, he played in seven games, starting four, during the 2002 season, catching 19 passes for 196 yards and three touchdowns while also posting 12 solo tackles, eight assisted tackles, and one fumble recovery.

Baker retired after the 2002 season as the team's all-time leader in receptions (353) and receiving yards (3,792). In 2003, the Rampage's community service award was named the Michael Baker Community Service Award. In 2007, for the tenth anniversary of the Grand Rapids Rampage, The Grand Rapids Press named Baker the top player in franchise history.

== Post-playing career ==
After his playing career, Baker was an assistant coach for the Rampage from 2003 to 2007. He was the wide receivers coach from 2003 to 2004 and the offensive coordinator from 2005 to 2007. He also spent time as the team's director of player personnel. Baker was an assistant coach for the Columbus Destroyers of the AFL in 2008. The league folded after the 2008 season. In 2014, the 2001 Grand Rapids Rampage were inducted into the Grand Rapids Sports Hall of Fame.
