= Wayne Coffey (American football) =

American football player (1964–2024)

No. 83, 27
- Position: Wide receiver

Personal information
- Born: May 30, 1964; Rantoul, Illinois, U.S.
- Died: June 2024 (aged 60)
- Listed height: 5 ft 7 in (1.70 m)
- Listed weight: 158 lb (72 kg)

Career information
- High school: Abilene (Abilene, Texas)
- College: Southwest Texas State
- NFL draft: 1986: undrafted

Career history
- New England Patriots (1986)*; Winnipeg Blue Bombers (1986)*; Kansas City Chiefs (1987)*; New England Patriots (1987); New England Steamrollers (1988); Atlanta Falcons (1988)*; Denver Dynamite (1989–1991); Sacramento Attack/Miami Hooters (1992–1993); Cincinnati Rockers (1993); Las Vegas Sting (1995)
- * Offseason or practice squad member only

Awards and highlights
- First-team All-Arena (1991)

Career NFL statistics
- Receptions: 3
- Receiving yards: 66
- Stats at Pro Football Reference

Career AFL statistics
- Receptions: 116
- Receiving yards: 1,897
- Receiving touchdowns: 32
- Tackles: 140
- Interceptions: 11
- Stats at ArenaFan.com

Wayne Everett Coffey (May 30, 1964 – June 2024) was an American professional football player who was a wide receiver in the National Football League (NFL) and Arena Football League (AFL). He played college football at Cisco College and Southwest Texas State University, earning junior college All-American honors while at Cisco.

After two years of offseason stints with the New England Patriots and Kansas City Chiefs, Coffey started two games for the Patriots during the 1987 NFL players strike. He later played in the AFL from 1989 to 1995 with the Denver Dynamite, Sacramento Attack/Miami Hooters, Cincinnati Rockers, and Las Vegas Sting. He was named first-team All-Arena in 1991 while playing for the Dynamite. Coffey was also a member of the Atlanta Falcons during the 1988 offseason.

== Early life and college ==
Wayne Everett Coffey was born on May 30, 1964, in Rantoul, Illinois. He participated in high school football and track at Abilene High School in Abilene, Texas. He was a cornerback in football and earned honorable mention all-district honors his senior year in 1981. Coffey graduated from Abilene High in 1982.

Coffey first played college football at Cisco College from 1982 to 1983 as a wide receiver, and earned junior college All-American honors. He caught 41 passes for 732 yards and ten touchdowns in 1983. He then transferred to Southwest Texas State University, where he was a two-year letterman for the Southwest Texas State Bobcats from 1984 to 1985. Coffey was also a punt returner in college.

== Professional career ==
After going undrafted in the 1986 NFL draft, Coffey signed with the New England Patriots on May 20, 1986. During a rookie scrimmage against the Washington Redskins on July 26, Coffey caught three passes for 58 yards (including a 40-yarder). The Morning Union noted that "Coffey's size (5-7, 158), plus the fact that the Patriots are deep at wide receiver, limit his chances of making the team despite the impressive performance." He was later released on August 19, 1986.

Coffey was signed to the practice roster of the Winnipeg Blue Bombers of the Canadian Football League in August 1986 following his release from the Patriots. On September 5, 1986, it was reported that he had been released by Winnipeg. Coffey signed with the Kansas City Chiefs in 1987. He was released in July 1987 before the start of training camp.

On September 23, 1987, Coffey re-signed with the Patriots during the 1987 NFL players strike. He had been attending Southwest Texas State to finish his degree when the Patriots contacted him again. He played in three games, starting two, for New England during the 1987 season and caught three passes for 66 yards. He was released on October 20, 1987, after the strike ended.

Coffey was signed by the New England Steamrollers of the Arena Football League (AFL) on April 11, 1988. However, he did not appear in any games during the 1988 AFL season and was then signed by the Atlanta Falcons on July 19, 1988. Coffey was released by Atlanta on August 9, 1988.

Coffey signed with the Denver Dynamite of the AFL in 1989. He was a wide receiver/defensive back during his time in the AFL as the league played under ironman rules. In 1992, Coffey noted that he had previously vowed that he would never play arena football after seeing the sport on ESPN. However, he later came to enjoy it although he "hated" playing defense, stating "The only reason I like it now is the simple fact that you can get interceptions." He played in all four games for the Dynamite during the 1989 season, recording 13 receptions for 208 yards and two touchdowns, four solo tackles, three assisted tackles, two sacks, four pass breakups, and 30 kick returns for 409 yards and one touchdown. Denver finished the season with a 3–1 record and lost to the Pittsburgh Gladiators in the first round of the playoffs by a score of 39–37. Coffey appeared in all eight games the next season in 1990, totaling 16 catches for 296 yards and seven touchdowns, 18 solo tackles, two assisted tackles, six interceptions for 61 yards and two touchdowns, four pass breakups, one fumble recovery, and 22 kick returns for 382 yards. The Dynamite finished the 1990 season 4–4 and lost in the first round to the Dallas Texans by a margin of 26–25.

On February 18, 1991, Coffey was selected by the San Antonio Riders of the World League of American Football (WLAF) in the sixth round, with the 57th overall pick, of the 1997 WLAF draft. However, he never played for the Riders.

Coffey played all ten games for the Dynamite in 1991, accumulating 24 catches for 377 yards and six touchdowns, 33 solo tackles, three assisted tackles, four interceptions for one yard, 12 pass breakups, and 23 kick returns for 547 yards. He was named first-team All-Arena for his performance during the 1991 season. The Dynamite went 6–4 and lost in the first round of the postseason for the third year in a row, this time to the Tampa Bay Storm 40–13. In a game during the 1991 season, Coffey attempted to hurdle over a defender into the end zone. However, he was knocked over the wall and bounced off another wall in the back of the end zone. The play, which scored a touchdown, was shown on ESPN and CNN, and used in AFL promotional packages.

Coffey signed with the AFL's Sacramento Attack for the 1992 season. He scored the first touchdown in franchise history on a 37-yard pass from Mike Hold. Coffey was named the AFL Ironman of the Week for week 1 of the 1992 season after posting six solo tackles, two assisted tackles, and one pass breakup on defense while catching three passes for 51 yards and one touchdown on offense. He also had two kick returns for 49 yards on special teams. Coffey played in all ten games for Sacramento in 1992, recording 38 receptions for 602 yards and a career-high 14 touchdowns, 39 solo tackles, seven assisted tackles, ten pass breakups, and seven kick returns for 112 yards as the Attacked finished 4–6. They lost in the first round of the playoffs to the Detroit Drive 48–23. The Attack became the Miami Hooters in 1993. Coffey played in the first game of the 1993 season, catching two passes for 45 yards and one touchdown while also posting four solo tackles.

On May 19, 1993, Coffey was traded to the Cincinnati Rockers for Saute Sapolu. Coffey played in nine games for the Rockers that year, totaling 22 receptions for 353 yards and one touchdown, 19 solo tackles, four assisted tackles, one interception, three pass breakups, and 23 kick returns for 512 yards and one touchdown.

After a year away from the league, Coffey appeared in nine games for the Las Vegas Sting of the AFL in 1995, recording one catch for 16 yards and one touchdown, 12 solo tackles, three assisted tackles, two pass breakups, and four kick returns for 63 yards.

== Personal life ==
Coffey's brother Ken Coffey played in the NFL. Wayne became a police office after his football career, reaching the rank of lieutenant. He provided security for Texas Longhorns home and away games. He retired in 2024 and died that same year in June.
