= 1996 Charlotte Rage season =

Arena Football League team season

- Head coach: Rick Buffington
- Home stadium: Charlotte Coliseum

Results
- Record: 5–9
- Division place: 2nd, Eastern
- Playoffs: Did not make playoffs

The 1996 Charlotte Rage season was the fifth and final season for the Charlotte Rage. They finished the 1996 Arena Football League season 5–9 and were one of four teams in the National Conference to miss the playoffs.

== Schedule ==
=== Regular season ===
Week	Date	Opponent	Results		Game site (attendance)
Week	Date	Opponent	Final score	Team record	Game site (attendance)
1	April 27	at Memphis Pharaohs	W 54–30	1–0	Pyramid Arena (6,451)
2	May 4	at Albany Firebirds	L 32–63	1–1	Knickerbocker Arena (13,029)
3	May 11	Connecticut Coyotes	W 49–31	2–1	Charlotte Coliseum (7,866)
4	May 18	Arizona Rattlers	L 48–54 (OT)	2–2	Charlotte Coliseum (5,688)
5	May 25	at Iowa Barnstormers	L 13–33	2–3	Veterans Memorial Auditorium (10,850)
6	June 1	Florida Bobcats	L 40–51	2–4	Charlotte Coliseum (6,688)
7	June 7	at Orlando Predators	L 47–56	2–5	Orlando Arena (15,127)
8	June 15	Texas Terror	W 31–15	3–5	Charlotte Coliseum (6,359)
9	June 21	Albany Firebirds	L 36–88	3–6	Charlotte Coliseum (6,898)
10	June 29	at Tampa Bay Storm	W 66–53	4–6	ThunderDome (15,492)
11	July 5	at St. Louis Stampede	L 41–44	4–7	Kiel Center (5,255)
12	July 13	Anaheim Piranhas	L 40–44	4–8	Charlotte Coliseum (6,978)
13	July 19	at Connecticut Coyotes	L 51–31	5–8	Hartford Civic Center (7,893)
14	July 27	Milwaukee Center	L 43–50	5–9	Bradley Center (7,481)
15	Bye				

== Standings ==
Team	Overall			Division		
Team	Wins	Losses	Percentage	Wins	Losses	Percentage
National Conference
Eastern Division
Albany Firebirds	10	4	0.714	4	0	1.000
Charlotte Rage	5	9	0.357	2	2	0.500
Connecticut Coyotes	2	12	0.143	0	4	0.000
Southern Division
Tampa Bay Storm	12	2	0.857	5	1	0.833
Orlando Predators	9	5	0.643	5	1	0.833
Florida Bobcats	6	8	0.429	2	4	0.333
Texas Terror	1	13	0.071	0	6	0.000
American Conference
Central Division
Iowa Barnstormers	12	2	0.857	4	2	0.667
Milwaukee Mustangs	10	4	0.714	5	1	0.833
St. Louis Stampede	8	6	0.571	3	3	0.500
Memphis Pharaohs	0	14	0.000	0	6	0.000
Western Division
Arizona Rattlers	11	3	0.786	3	2	0.600
Anaheim Piranhas	9	5	0.643	4	1	0.800
San Jose SaberCats	6	8	0.429	1	4	0.200
Minnesota Fighting Pike	4	10	0.286	1	2	0.333

- Green indicates clinched playoff berth
- Blue indicates division champion
- Grey indicates best regular season record
