= Alvin Ashley =

American football player (born 1969)

No. 12
- Position: Wide receiver

Personal information
- Born: October 14, 1969 (age 57); Fort Myers, Florida

Career information
- College: Southwest Minnesota State

Career history
- Milwaukee Mustangs (1994); Miami Hooters (1995); Albany Firebirds (1995); Minnesota Fighting Pike (1996); New Jersey Red Dogs (1997–1999); Milwaukee Mustangs (2000–2001); New Jersey Gladiators (2002); Tampa Bay Storm (2002–2003); Carolina Cobras (2003); Grand Rapids Rampage (2004)

Awards and highlights
- First Team All-Arena (1998); Second Team All-Arena (1997)

Career AFL statistics
- Receptions: 629
- Receiving yards: 7,561
- Touchdowns: 142
- Stats at ArenaFan.com

Alvin Ashley (born October 14, 1969) is an American former football wide receiver in the Arena Football League. He played college football at Southwest Minnesota State.

Ashley played for the Milwaukee Mustangs, Miami Hooters, Albany Firebirds, Minnesota Fighting Pike, New Jersey Red Dogs, New Jersey Gladiators, Tampa Bay Storm, Carolina Cobras, and Grand Rapids Rampage.
