= Roosevelt Nix =

Roosevelt Nix may refer to:

- Roosevelt Nix (defensive end) (born 1967), American football defensive end
- Roosevelt Nix (fullback) (born 1992), American football fullback
