= Joe Fuller =

American football player (born 1964)

No. 29, 21
- Position: Cornerback

Personal information
- Born: September 25, 1964 (age 62); Milligan, Florida
- Listed height: 5 ft 11 in (1.80 m)
- Listed weight: 180 lb (82 kg)

Career information
- College: Northern Iowa
- NFL draft: 1986: undrafted

Career history
- Saskatchewan Roughriders (1986–1988); Minnesota Vikings (1989)*; San Diego Chargers (1990); Green Bay Packers (1991); Ottawa Rough Riders (1993); Shreveport Pirates (1994–1995); Toronto Argonauts (1995); Minnesota Fighting Pike (1996)
- * Offseason or practice squad member only

Career NFL statistics
- Interceptions: 1
- Stats at Pro Football Reference
- Stats at ArenaFan.com

Joe Robert Fuller is a former cornerback in the National Football League. He played with the San Diego Chargers and the Green Bay Packers. He also played in the Canadian Football League. Fuller was an all-conference player at the University of Northern Iowa.
