= Bruce LaSane =

American football player (born 1967)

No. 87
- Position: Wide receiver

Personal information
- Born: March 24, 1967 (age 59)
- Listed height: 6 ft 4 in (1.93 m)
- Listed weight: 225 lb (102 kg)

Career information
- High school: Wildwood (FL)
- College: Florida State
- NFL draft: 1990: undrafted

Career history
- Tampa Bay Buccaneers (1990)*; Orlando Thunder (1991); Cincinnati Rockers (1992–1993); Miami Hooters (1994–1995); Minnesota Fighting Pike (1996); Milwaukee Mustangs (1996); Orlando Predators (1997–1998); New Jersey Red Dogs (2000); Los Angeles Avengers (2000)
- * Offseason or practice squad member only

Awards and highlights
- ArenaBowl champion (1998); First-team All-Arena (1994)

Career AFL statistics
- Receptions: 190
- Receiving yards: 2,014
- Receiving TDs: 33
- Tackles: 150.5
- Pass breakups: 12
- Stats at ArenaFan.com

Bruce Wayne LaSane (born March 24, 1967) is an American former professional football wide receiver who played eight seasons in the Arena Football League (AFL) with the Cincinnati Rockers, Miami Hooters, Minnesota Fighting Pike, Milwaukee Mustangs, Orlando Predators, New Jersey Red Dogs, and Los Angeles Avengers. He played college football at Florida State University. He was also a member of the Tampa Bay Buccaneers and Orlando Thunder.

== Early life ==
LaSane played high school football at Wildwood High School in Wildwood, Florida. The Wildcats advanced to the Class AA state championship game in 1984 and 1985. His senior season, he was a member of the Super 24 team, was a USA Today honorable mention All-American, was named a Bally All-American and represented Wildwood in the Florida-Georgia all-star game.

== College career ==
LaSane was a member of the Florida State Seminoles from 1986 to 1989. He recorded 46 receptions for 731 and six touchdowns in his college career. He was an Honorable Mention All-American selection by The Sporting News in 1988.

== Professional career ==
LaSane signed with the Tampa Bay Buccaneers in July 1990 after going undrafted in the 1990 NFL draft.

LaSane selected in the seventh round of the WLAF's wide receivers draft by the Orlando Thunder in 1991.

LaSane played for the Cincinnati Rockers from 1992 to 1993.

LaSane played for the Miami Hooters from 1994 to 1995, earning first-team All-Arena honors in 1994.

LaSane spent time with the Minnesota Fighting Pike in 1996.

LaSane also spent time with the Milwaukee Mustangs during the 1996 season.

LaSane played for the Orlando Predators from 1997 to 1998.

LaSane signed with the New Jersey Red Dogs on April 21, 2000.

LaSane was traded to the Los Angeles Avengers on June 6, 2000.
