= Carlos Fowler =

American gridiron football player (born 1972)

No. 75, 91, 92
- Position: Offensive lineman / Defensive lineman

Personal information
- Born: August 30, 1972 (age 54); Cleveland, Ohio, U.S.
- Listed height: 6 ft 3 in (1.91 m)
- Listed weight: 280 lb (127 kg)

Career information
- High school: Pontiac Township (Pontiac, Illinois)
- College: Wisconsin (1990–1993)
- NFL draft: 1994: undrafted

Career history
- Denver Broncos (1994)*; Toronto Argonauts (1994–1995); Hamilton Tiger-Cats (1995); Ottawa Rough Riders (1996)*; Toronto Argonauts (1996)*; Texas Terror (1996–1997); England Monarchs (1998); Houston ThunderBears (1998–1999); Houston Outlaws (1999); Arizona Rattlers (2000)*; Nashville Kats (2000); Los Angeles Avengers (2001–2004)
- * Offseason or practice squad member only

Awards and highlights
- First-team All-Arena (1997); AFL Lineman of the Year (1997); First-team All-RFL (1999)
- Stats at ArenaFan.com

Carlos Antonio Fowler (born August 30, 1972) is an American former professional football player who was a lineman for nine seasons in the Arena Football League (AFL) with the Texas Terror/Houston ThunderBears, Nashville Kats, and Los Angeles Avengers. He played college football at the University of Wisconsin–Madison, where he was a starter for the Rose Bowl champion Wisconsin Badgers. He signed with the Denver Broncos after going unselected in the 1994 NFL draft. After starting for the Broncos during the 1994 preseason, Fowler was released and then played in the Canadian Football League (CFL) from 1994 to 1995. He began his AFL career in 1997, earning AFL Lineman of the Year and first-team All-Arena honors as a rookie with the Texas Terror. He advanced to ArenaBowl XIV with the Nashville Kats in 2000, and later helped the Los Angeles Avengers make three straight playoff appearances during the 2000s. Fowler also garnered first-team all-league recognition while playing in the short-lived Regional Football League in 1999.

== Early life ==
Carlos Antonio Fowler was born on August 30, 1972, in Cleveland, Ohio. Before his freshman year of high school, Fowler moved to Pontiac, Illinois, where he attended Pontiac Township High School. He played on both the offensive and defensive line in high school, and was a four-year letterman. Fowler earned all-state honors in football. As a senior in 1989, he helped the Pontiac Township football team make their first state playoff appearance. He participated in track and basketball in high school as well. Fowler graduated in 1990.

== College career ==
Fowler accepted an athletic scholarship to attend the University of Wisconsin–Madison, and play college football for the Wisconsin Badgers. He was a four-year letterman from 1990 to 1993. As a true freshman in 1990, he started three games at defensive tackle for the 1–10 Badgers. Fowler then started every game for Wisconsin from 1991 to 1993. As a senior in 1993, he posted 49 tackles and three sacks as a starter for the 10–1–1 Badgers. He played in 41 games overall, starting 33, during his college career and recorded 223 tackles. Fowler broke his wrist in the 1994 Rose Bowl, but also had a sack and a forced fumble during the game. His broken wrist forced him to turn down Senior Bowl and Hula Bowl invitations. He majored in marketing and advertising.

== Professional career ==
Fowler worked out at the 1993 NFL Combine while still wearing a cast. He signed with the Denver Broncos in April 1993 shortly after going unselected in the 1993 NFL draft. He had six tackles during his first preseason game on July 31. He was promoted to the starting lineup for the team's next preseason game on August 6. Fowler was cut by the Broncos on August 23, 1994.

On August 30, 1994, Fowler signed a contract with the Toronto Argonauts of the Canadian Football League (CFL) for the remainder of the 1994 season and the 1995 season. The Argonauts wanted to sign him to a four-year deal, but he declined, stating "I know I can get in the NFL because I was so close." He dressed in five games for the Argonauts during the 1994 season and posted six defensive tackles. He competed with John Thornton for the team's nose tackle position before the start of the 1995 season. Fowler was placed on the injured list before the start of the regular season on June 27, 1995. He dressed in six games for the Argonauts in 1995, recording 19 defensive tackles, two special teams tackles, and four sacks before being moved to the practice roster. He was released from the practice roster on October 17, 1995.

Fowler was signed by the CFL's Hamilton Tiger-Cats on October 28, 1995. He played in the final game of the regular season the next day but did not record any statistics. He also played in Hamilton's playoff loss to the Calgary Stampeders. Fowler was released by the Tiger-Cats on May 9, 1996. He then signed with the Ottawa Rough Riders of the CFL in 1996. He was cut by the Rough Riders on June 22, 1996. He then spent part of the 1996 CFL season on the Toronto Argonauts' practice roster.

Fowler played in one game for the Texas Terror of the Arena Football League (AFL) in 1996, posting one solo tackle and two assisted tackles. He appeared in all 14 games for the Terror in 1997, totaling 32 solo tackles, five assisted tackles, 11.5 sacks, two forced fumbles, and one fumble recovery. He was an offensive lineman/defensive lineman during his time in the AFL as the league played under ironman rules. Fowler's 11.5 sacks were the most in the league that year and the second-most in a season all-time. He also had an AFL-record ten tackles for loss while the Terror offensive line only allowed ten sacks in 14 games. Fowler was named both first-team All-Arena and the AFL Lineman of the Year for his performance during the 1997 season. The Terror became the Houston ThunderBears in 1998.

Fowler played for the England Monarchs of NFL Europe during the 1998 NFL Europe season as a defensive end, recording 30 tackles, three sacks, and nine pass breakups. After the Monarchs' season ended, Fowler was activated by the ThunderBears on June 17, 1998. He then played in the final seven games of the 1998 season, posting six solo tackles and eight assisted tackles. Houston finished the season with an 8–6 record and lost in the first round of the playoffs to the Arizona Rattlers by a score of 50–36.

Fowler began the 1999 season playing for the Houston Outlaws in the short-lived Regional Football League (RFL). In June 1999, he earned first-team All-RFL honors at defensive tackle. After the RFL season ended, Fowler returned to the ThunderBears. He appeared in three games for Houston during the 1999 season, accumulating two solo tackles, two assisted tackles, and one pass breakup.

On November 5, 1999, Fowler was traded to the Rattlers for Joe Burch. On March 21, 2000, Fowler was traded to the Nashville Kats for Sebastian Barrie. Fowler played in all 14 games for the Kats in 2000, recording 11 solo tackles, six assisted tackles, 0.5 sacks, and one pass breakup. Nashville finished the year with a 9–5 record and advanced to ArenaBowl XIV, where they lost to the Orlando Predators by a margin of 41–38. Fowler became a free agent after the 2000 season.

Fowler signed with the Los Angeles Avengers of the AFL on January 13, 2001. He appeared in 13 games for the Avengers in 2001, totaling ten solo tackles, seven assisted tackles, four sacks, and one forced fumble. He re-signed with Los Angeles on March 26, 2002. Fowler played in 13 games, all starts, the next year in 2002, recording ten solo tackles, five assisted tackles, one sack, one fumble recovery, and one pass breakup. The Avengers finished the 2002 season with an 8–6 record and lost in the first round to the Tampa Bay Storm 66–41. He played in all 16 games, starting 13, during the 2003 season, posting nine solo tackles, three assisted tackles, and 0.5 sacks. Los Angeles went 11–5 and lost in the first round of the 2003 postseason to the Rattlers by a score of 70–63. Fowler appeared in all 16 games for the second consecutive season in 2004, totaling nine solo tackles, seven assisted tackles, and one pass breakup. The Avengers finished the 2004 season 9–7 and lost in the quarterfinals to the Rattlers by a margin of 59–42. Fowler was placed on the refused to report list on January 3, 2005. He was later released on October 24, 2005.
