= Thomas Scallen =

American lawyer

Thomas Kaine Scallen (August 14, 1925 – March 21, 2015) was the first owner of the NHL's Vancouver Canucks. He owned the team from 1970 to 1974, when Frank Griffiths, an owner of several Vancouver area radio and television stations, the next largest shareholder in the Canucks, took over after Scallen was arrested. He was found guilty of securities fraud in 1973, and a later appeal failed.

Upon graduation from Saint Thomas Academy, he enlisted in the United States Army and fought in World War II. For his military service, Scallen was awarded the Combat Infantry Badge and a Bronze Star. He obtained a B.A. and J.D. from the University of Denver and began practicing law, serving a stint as Minnesota assistant attorney general. He was married twice, firstly to Mary Semsch, with whom he had six children.

In the early 1960, Scallen was employed in the banking industry. He then took a leadership position with the Ice Follies which he later purchased.

He then married Bille Jo Brice in 1990, and lived with her until his death. Scallen was the chairman of Medicor, a medical insurance company based his home state, Minnesota. Scallen was the lead investor in a group that sought a United States Football League expansion team in Minneapolis for the 1984 USFL season. He was president of International Broadcasting Corporation, which owned the Ice Capades and Harlem Globetrotters. The company filed for bankruptcy in 1991. Later, he was chairman and principal owner of Century Park Pictures, an entertainment company that for a time owned the Minnesota Fighting Pike arena football team. From 1999-2009, he was the owner of Chanhassen Dinner Theatres in Chanhassen, Minnesota, one of the nation's largest dinner theaters. Scallen died in Minneapolis in 2015 at the age of 89.

Sporting positions
Preceded by Expansion team	Owner of Vancouver Canucks; 1970–1974	Succeeded by Frank Griffiths
