= Terrence Melton =

American football player (born 1977)

No. 53, 51, 55
- Position: Linebacker

Personal information
- Born: January 1, 1977 (age 49); Miami, Florida, U.S.
- Listed height: 6 ft 1 in (1.85 m)
- Listed weight: 235 lb (107 kg)

Career information
- College: Rice
- NFL draft: 1999: undrafted

Career history
- Houston Thunderbears (2000–2001); Arizona Rattlers (2002)*; Saskatchewan Roughriders (2002–2003); Atlanta Falcons (2004); New Orleans Saints (2004–2006); Carolina Panthers (2007); Baltimore Ravens (2008); Florida Tuskers (2009–2010); Virginia Destroyers (2011–2012)
- * Offseason or practice squad member only

Awards and highlights
- UFL champion (2011); AFL All-Rookie Team (2000)

Career NFL statistics
- Total tackles: 53
- Fumble recoveries: 1
- Pass deflections: 1
- Stats at Pro Football Reference
- Stats at ArenaFan.com

Terrence Lee Melton (born January 1, 1977) is an American former professional football player who was a linebacker in the National Football League (NFL) and Canadian Football League (CFL). He played college football for the Rice Owls. He was signed by the Houston Thunderbears of the Arena Football League (AFL) as a street free agent in 2000.

Melton also played for the Arizona Rattlers, Saskatchewan Roughriders, Atlanta Falcons, New Orleans Saints, Carolina Panthers and Baltimore Ravens.

== Professional career ==
Melton was traded to the Florida Tuskers of the United Football League on August 25, 2009.
