= Florida Hammerheads =

- City: Miami, Florida, U.S.
- League: Roller Hockey International
- Division: Northeast
- Operated: 1993–1994
- Home arena: Miami Arena (1993); West Palm Beach Auditorium (1993–1994)
- Owner(s): Julia Neal
- General manager: Karen Keilt
- Head coach: Brad Buetow

The Florida Hammerheads were a professional inline hockey team based in Miami, Florida. The Hammerheads played in Roller Hockey International from 1993 to 1994 and played their home games at Miami Arena and West Palm Beach Auditorium.

== Team history ==
The Hammerheads were first owned by Julia Neal, who was the only female owner in Roller Hockey International. The General Manager Karen Keilt was the first female general manager of a men’s professional hockey team. The coach was Brad Buetow. The team played in RHI's Northeast division. The team's first game was July 10, 1993, on the road to the Connecticut Coasters, with their first home game on July 25. The Hammerheads drew an average of 1,000 fans per game in their first season which was played at the Miami Arena. Julia Neal sold the team to Arthur Barr and Sol Zuckerman and the team moved mid-season to West Palm Beach Auditorium in an effort to grow their fan base.'
