= Chris Spencer (arena football) =

American football player (born 1970)

No. 22, 83
- Positions: Wide receiver, linebacker

Personal information
- Born: August 31, 1970 (age 56)
- Listed height: 6 ft 4 in (1.93 m)
- Listed weight: 235 lb (107 kg)

Career information
- College: Iowa State
- NFL draft: 1993: undrafted

Career history
- New York Jets (1993)*; Calgary Stampeders (1995)*; Iowa Barnstormers (1995–1998); New Jersey Red Dogs (1998); Iowa Barnstormers (1999–2000)
- * Offseason or practice squad member only
- Stats at ArenaFan.com

Chris Spencer (born August 31, 1970) is an American former professional football wide receiver/linebacker with played in the Arena Football League (AFL) with the Iowa Barnstormers and New Jersey Red Dogs. He played college football for the Iowa State Cyclones.

== Early life ==
Chris Spencer was born on August 31, 1970. He played college football for the Iowa State Cyclones as a wide receiver. He was a three-year letterman from 1990 to 1992. He finished his college career with 82 catches for 1,278 yards and three touchdowns.

== Professional career ==
After going undrafted in the 1993 NFL draft, Spencer signed with the New York Jets on May 4, 1993. He was placed on injured reserve on August 24, 1993, for the remainder of the 1993 season.

On December 14, 1994, Spencer signed with the upstart Iowa Barnstormers of the Arena Football League (AFL). In March 1995, Spencer was signed by the Calgary Stampeders of the Canadian Football League. He was later released on June 8, 1995. Spencer then returned to the Barnstormers. He was a wide receiver/linebacker during his AFL career as the league played under ironman rules. During the 1996 postseason, he caught 15 passes for eight touchdowns as Iowa advanced to ArenaBowl X. In April 1997, it was reported that Spencer had turned down a contract offer from the Dallas Cowboys due to not getting a signing bonus. Spencer said "A lot of people are telling me I'm crazy, but if you don't get any money up front, they have nothing to lose when they let you go. They'll think about it more if you have a signing bonus." He suffered a torn ACL towards the end of the 1997 regular season.

In early June 1998, Spencer and future considerations were traded to the New Jersey Red Dogs for Aaron Garcia. Spencer played in six games for the Red Dogs during the 1998 season.

During 1999 training camp, Spencer was traded back to the Barnstormers for Tutu Atwell. Spencer played for the Barnstormers through the 2000 season. He missed part of the 2000 season due to injury.

Spencer finished his AFL career with totals of 56 games played, 145 receptions, 1,771 receiving yards, 29 receiving touchdowns, six carries, six rushing yards, one rushing touchdown, 14 kick returns, 114 kick return yards, 66 solo tackles, 35 assisted tackles, five interceptions, eight pass breakups, five forced fumbles, five fumble recoveries, and two blocked kicks.
