= Bernard Hall (American football) =

American football player (born 1967)

Profile
- Position: Fullback / Linebacker

Personal information
- Born: January 16, 1967 (age 59)
- Listed height: 6 ft 1 in (1.85 m)
- Listed weight: 245 lb (111 kg)

Career information
- High school: Henry Ford (Detroit, Michigan)
- College: Central State
- NFL draft: 1995: undrafted

Career history
- St. Louis Stampede (1996); Nashville Kats (1997)

Awards and highlights
- First-team All-Arena (1996)

Career AFL statistics
- Rushing attempts: 101
- Rushing Yards: 372
- Rushing TDs: 26
- Receiving TDs: 3
- Tackles: 28.5
- Stats at ArenaFan.com

Bernard Hall (born January 16, 1967) is an American former professional football player who played for the St. Louis Stampede of the Arena Football League (AFL). He played college football at the University of Oklahoma and Central State University.

== Early life ==
Bernard Hall was born on January 16, 1967. He played high school football at Henry Ford High School in Detroit Michigan as a quarterback. He led the team to 27 straight regular season wins and three consecutive Detroit Public School League championships. Hall was a two-time All-State selection.

== College career ==
Hall enrolled at the University of Oklahoma to play college football, but missed his freshman year in 1986 due to academic issues. He played in the first nine games of the 1987 season as a backup running back, recording 16 carries for 55 yards and one touchdown, one reception for five yards, five kick returns for 88 yards, and 11 punt returns for 145 yards. He was suspended for the final two games of the season for stealing tights from a teammate. He missed the 1988 season due to insufficient grades and took classes at Rose State College that semester. On November 22, 1989, Hall and fellow Sooners football player Nigel Clay were sentenced to ten years in prison for raping a 20-year-old woman in a University of Oklahoma dorm on January 21, 1989. In 1994, Hall was released from prison after four and a half years and then enrolled at Central State University to play football for the Central State Marauders. He played for Central State as a tight end. His college football eligibility ran out after the 1994 season. In early April 1995, Hall played in The National College Football All-Stars Double Header in Louisville, Kentucky.

== Professional career ==
Hall signed with the St. Louis Stampede of the Arena Football League (AFL) on March 29, 1996, as a 29-year-old rookie. He was a fullback / linebacker during his time in the AFL as the league played under ironman rules. In the third game of the season, he tied an AFL record with five rushing touchdowns. Overall, he played in all 14 games during the 1996 season, totaling 101 rushes for 372 yards and 26 touchdowns, seven catches for 144 yards and three touchdowns, 25 solo tackles, seven assisted tackles, two forced fumbles, one fumble recovery, and four pass breakups. His carries and rushing touchdown totals set AFL single-season records while his rushing yards total was second best all-time. He also had an 86-yard rushing game in 1996, which was the second-most in AFL history at the time. The Stampede finished the year with an 8–6 record and lost in the first round of the playoffs to the Iowa Barnstormers by a score of 52–49. Hall fractured his ankle during the playoff loss to the Barnstormers. He was named first-team All-Arena for his performance during the 1996 season. The Stampede folded after the 1996 season.

On November 21, 1996, Hall was selected by the Nashville Kats with the 43rd overall pick of the 1996 AFL dispersal draft. On April 10, 1997, it was reported that he had been placed on the unable to report list while he was still recovering from the prior year's injury. He was placed on injured reserve on April 29, 1997, before the start of the regular season.

== Personal life ==
Hall's son, Breece Hall, is an NFL player.
