= Carlton Johnson =

American football player (born 1969)

No. 32, 19
- Position: Defensive back

Personal information
- Born: October 13, 1969 (age 57); Las Vegas, Nevada, U.S.
- Listed height: 5 ft 10 in (1.78 m)
- Listed weight: 190 lb (86 kg)

Career information
- High school: Rancho (North Las Vegas, Nevada)
- College: UNLV (1987–1991)
- NFL draft: 1992: undrafted

Career history
- Las Vegas Sting (1994); Shreveport Pirates (1994–1995); Anaheim Piranhas (1996–1997); Albany Firebirds (1998)

Awards and highlights
- First-team All-Arena (1994); Second-team All-Arena (1996); 2× First-team All-Big West (1990–1991)

Career AFL statistics
- Tackles: 184.5
- Interceptions: 7
- Pass breakups: 35
- Forced fumbles: 3
- Total touchdowns: 2
- Stats at ArenaFan.com

Carleton Elijah Johnson (born October 13, 1969), known as Carlton Johnson, is an American former professional football player and convicted murderer. A defensive back, he played four seasons in the Arena Football League (AFL) with the Las Vegas Sting, Anaheim Piranhas, and Albany Firebirds, and two seasons in the Canadian Football League (CFL) with the Shreveport Pirates.

He played college football at the University of Nevada, Las Vegas, where he was a two-time first-team All-Big West Conference selection. He joined the AFL in 1994 and earned first-team All-Arena honors during his rookie season. After two years as a starter in the CFL, Johnson returned to the AFL in 1996 and garnered second-team All-Arena recognition. His pro football career was plagued by injuries. He had left knee injuries for three straight years from 1995 to 1997 and suffered a career-ending spinal injury in 1998. In 2007, Johnson was sentenced to 60 years to life in prison for killing three of his family members.

== Early life and college ==
Carleton Elijah Johnson was born on October 13, 1969, in Las Vegas, Nevada. He attended Rancho High School in North Las Vegas, Nevada.

In February 1987, Johnson committed to play college football for the UNLV Rebels of the University of Nevada, Las Vegas. He was a three-year letterman for the Rebels from 1989 to 1991. He had three interceptions for 52 yards in 1990 and four interceptions for no yards in 1991. He earned first-team All-Big West Conference honors in 1990 and 1991.

== Professional career ==
Pre-draft measurables
Height	Weight	Arm length	Hand span	40-yard dash	10-yard split	20-yard split	20-yard shuttle	Vertical jump	Broad jump	Bench press
5 ft 8 5/8 in (1.74 m)	195 lb (88 kg)	30 in (0.76 m)	8 7/8 in (0.23 m)	4.78 s	1.71 s	2.78 s	4.38 s	32.0 in (0.81 m)	9 ft 5 in (2.87 m)	10 reps
All values from NFL Combine

Johnson was invited to the 1992 NFL Combine as a free safety but performed poorly. He went undrafted in the 1992 NFL draft and did not sign with any NFL teams.

Johnson signed with the Las Vegas Sting of the Arena Football League (AFL) on April 27, 1994. He played in 12 games for the Sting during the 1994 season as a defensive specialist, posting 59 solo tackles, 19 assisted tackles, 11 pass breakups, and five interceptions for 67 yards and one touchdown. He was named first-team All-Arena for his performance during the 1994 season. The Sting finished the year with a 4–8 record and lost in the first round of the playoffs to the Albany Firebirds by a score of 49–30.

After the AFL season, Johnson signed with the Shreveport Pirates of the Canadian Football League (CFL). He made his first start at cornerback on September 3, 1994, against the Baltimore CFL's after cornerback Antoine Worthman was moved to halfback to replace the injured Kip Texada. Johnson dressed in ten games overall during the 1994 season, recording 24 defensive tackles, seven assisted tackles, one sack, one fumble recovery, and four pass breakups. In June 1995, it was reported that Johnson had received head coach Forrest Gregg's "seal of approval" to remain the team's starting cornerback. However, Johnson suffered a knee injury in the season opener on a block by San Antonio Texans receiver Joe Kralik. Johnson was then transferred to the injured list. Doctors at first contemplated surgery for Johnson but his knee ligaments started to heal on their own, so surgery was not necessary. After more than two months on the injured list, Johnson was activated prior to the September 15 game against Baltimore. He dressed in seven games total during the 1995 season, totaling 25 defensive tackles, one interception, and two pass breakups. He became a free agent on February 15, 1996.

Upon becoming a free agent, Johnson was activated off of the Anaheim Piranhas' exempt list. The Piranhas were formerly the Las Vegas Sting. He decided to sign with the Piranhas in March 1996 instead of trying out for the CFL again due to the fact that the Piranhas' owners, like Johnson, were born again Christians. Johnson stated "I was looking for more than just football this time. Football only lasts for a short time. The Lord will be with me when I'm gone." On June 29 against the Iowa Barnstormers, he injured his left knee on a kickoff return. It was the same knee he injured the prior year while in the CFL, with Johnson stating "I kept telling the doctors last year that it wasn't torn and I had to keep telling our doctors the same thing this year. It was expected that he would be activated off of the injured reserve list, but he ended up missing the final four games of the season. Johnson played in ten games overall for the Piranhas in 1996, recording 46 solo tackles, 14 assisted tackles, one fumble recovery, two interceptions, and three pass breakups while also returning four kicks for 76 yards. Anaheim finished the year 9–5 and lost in the first round to the Tampa Bay Storm by a margin of 30–16. Johnson garnered second-team All-Arena recognition for the 1996 season. Johnson appeared in the first three games of the 1997 season before suffering a left knee ligament injury for the third year in a row. He was placed on injured reserve again on May 22, 1997.

Johnson played in ten games for the Albany Firebirds of the AFL in 1998, posting 38 solo tackles, 29 assisted tackles, three forced fumbles, and 19 pass breakups. On July 13, 1998, against the Arizona Rattlers, Johnson suffered a spinal injury after he was accidentally hit on the left side of the head while attempting to make a tackle. Johnson was paralyzed for about five minutes and hospitalized. He regained feeling in his extremities after being taken to the hospital, where X-rays were negative. He then retired from football after doctors warned him he could be paralyzed for life if he was hit again.

== Personal life ==
Johnson was later a volunteer football coach and substitute teacher at Cheyenne High School in North Las Vegas. On June 1, 2005, he was served with a notice of financial responsibility after a complaint was filed by his son's mother. He also had an ongoing child support dispute with a different woman.

On June 18, 2005, Johnson shot to death his 5-year-old son, 38-year-old brother, and 6-year-old niece at the family's shared apartment. He drove away from the apartment and parked at a car wash. He then walked to another apartment complex, where he robbed a woman with a shotgun and ran away. Johnson later got into a fistfight with some men and was then arrested. After his arrest, he was sent to a state mental health facility where he received medication to treat a delusional disorder. Neighbors reported that Johnson had been known to leave his apartment door open and sit on his couch with a shotgun in order to "protect" his Ford Mustang. In July 2007, he was convicted of three counts of second-degree murder and sentenced to 60 years to life in prison. He was also sentenced to an additional 12 years for the robbery.
