= Rodney Mazion =

American football player (born 1971)

No. 2
- Position: Defensive back

Personal information
- Born: February 4, 1971 (age 55)
- Listed height: 5 ft 8 in (1.73 m)
- Listed weight: 175 lb (79 kg)

Career information
- High school: Hillsborough (Tampa, Florida)
- College: Nevada-Las Vegas (1990–1994)
- NFL draft: 1995: undrafted

Career history
- Las Vegas Sting/Anaheim Piranhas (1995–1997); Milwaukee Mustangs (1998–1999)

Awards and highlights
- First-team All-Arena (1996); Second-team All-Arena (1997); 2× Second-team All-Big West (1992, 1994)

Career AFL statistics
- Tackles: 238.5
- Pass breakups: 50
- Interceptions: 25
- Return TDs: 15
- Total TDs: 20
- Stats at ArenaFan.com

Rodney K. Mazion (born February 4, 1971) is an American former professional football defensive back who played five seasons in the Arena Football League (AFL) with the Las Vegas Sting/Anaheim Piranhas and Milwaukee Mustangs. He played college football and baseball at the University of Nevada, Las Vegas. He also played minor league baseball for the Pittsfield Mets.

== Early life ==
Rodney K. Mazion was born on February 4, 1971. He participated in football, baseball, and track at Hillsborough High School in Tampa, Florida. In 1988, he helped Hillsborough High set a state record in the 4 x 100 relay. Mazion suffered a torn ACL during his senior season, only appearing in two football games that year. Mazion was selected by the Seattle Mariners in the 48th round of the 1990 MLB June Amateur Draft.

== College career ==
Mazion played college football for the UNLV Rebels of the University of Nevada, Las Vegas. He was redshirted in 1990. He was a four-year letterman and four-year starter from 1991 to 1994. Mazion recorded two interceptions for 96 yards and one touchdown in 1991, three interceptions for one yard in 1992, two interceptions for 82 yards in 1993, and two interceptions for no yards in 1994. Mazion also caught three passes for 34 yards and returned four kicks for 95 yards during the 1991 season. He was named honorable mention All-Big West Conference as a freshman and junior and second-team All-Big West as a sophomore and senior. He majored in criminal justice in college. He also played baseball at UNLV, appearing in 47 games and batting .299.

== Professional career ==
Mazion was selected by the New York Mets in the 15th round of the 1993 MLB June Amateur Draft. He played in 46 games for the Pittsfield Mets of the New York Mets organization in 1993, batting .266 with no home runs and 18 RBIs. He was an outfielder with the Mets.

Mazion went undrafted in the 1995 NFL draft. He was reportedly considered too small for the NFL. He played in nine games for the Las Vegas Sting of the Arena Football League (AFL) during the 1995 season, recording 39 solo tackles, 16 assisted tackles, three interceptions, six pass breakups, and 36 kick returns for 691 yards and one touchdown. The Sting became the Anaheim Piranhas in 1996. He appeared in 12 games for the Piranhas during the 1996 season, totaling 52 solo tackles, two assisted tackles, one forced fumble, seven interceptions, eight pass breakups, and 55 kick returns for 1,081 yards and four touchdowns. The Piranhas finished the year with a 9–5 record and lost in the first round of the playoffs to the Tampa Bay Storm by a score of 30–16. Mazion was named first-team All-Arena as a defensive specialist for his performance during the 1996 season. On May 24, 1997, against the Florida Bobcats, he set an AFL single-game record with 315 kick return yards (219 on kickoffs and 96 on missed field goals). Overall, he played in 13 games in 1997, accumulating 51 solo tackles, 16 assisted tackles, one fumble recovery, 11 pass breakups, five interceptions for 84 yards and one touchdown, and 69 kick returns for 1,684 yards and three touchdowns. He earned second-team All-Arena honors at defensive specialist for the 1997 season.

Mazion appeared in all 14 games for the Milwaukee Mustangs of the AFL in 1998, recording 33 solo tackles, 13 assisted tackles, four interceptions, 11 pass breakups, 58 kick returns for 1,010 yards and seven touchdowns, and six receptions for 81 yards and two touchdowns. The Mustangs finished the 1998 season with a 7–7 record. Mazion played in all 14 games for the second straight season in 1999, totaling 34 solo tackles, 12 assisted tackles, six interceptions, 14 pass breakups, three kick returns for 33 yards, and 13 catches for 158 yards and two touchdowns. The Mustangs finished 7–7 for the second consecutive year and lost in the first round of the playoffs to the Iowa Barnstormers 66–34.
