= Roosevelt Nix (defensive end) =

American football player (1967–2023)

No. 95, 79
- Position: Defensive end

Personal information
- Born: April 17, 1967 (age 59); Toledo, Ohio, U.S.
- Died: December 8, 2023 (aged 56)
- Listed height: 6 ft 6 in (1.98 m)
- Listed weight: 299 lb (136 kg)

Career information
- High school: Toledo (OH) Scott
- College: Central State (Ohio)
- NFL draft: 1992: 8th round, 199th overall pick

Career history
- Cincinnati Bengals (1992–1993); Minnesota Vikings (1994); Green Bay Packers (1995)*; Arizona Cardinals (1995)*; Minnesota Fighting Pike (1996); New York CityHawks (1997–1998); New England Sea Wolves (1999)*
- * Offseason or practice squad member only

Career NFL statistics
- Tackles: 6
- Sacks: 1.0
- Stats at Pro Football Reference

Career AFL statistics
- Tackles: 13
- Fumble recoveries: 1
- Passes defended: 2
- Stats at ArenaFan.com

Roosevelt Theodore Nix (born April 17, 1967 – December 8, 2023) was an American professional football defensive end who played three seasons in the National Football League (NFL) with the Cincinnati Bengals and Minnesota Vikings. Nix attended Scott High School in Toledo, Ohio, and first enrolled at the College of DuPage before transferring to Central State University. He was then drafted by the Bengals in the eighth round of the 1992 NFL draft. Nix was also a member of the Green Bay Packers and Arizona Cardinals of the NFL, and Minnesota Fighting Pike, New York CityHawks, and New England Sea Wolves of the Arena Football League (AFL).

== College career ==
Nix first played college football for the College of DuPage Chaparrals. Nix transferred from the College of DuPage to play one season for the Central State Marauders. Before attending Central State, he also worked at Glic Environmental in Toledo, Ohio, which was owned by former NFL player Gil Mains.

== Professional career ==
Nix was selected by the Cincinnati Bengals with the 199th pick in the 1992 NFL draft. He played in sixteen games for the Bengals from 1992 to 1993.

Nix played in two games for the Minnesota Vikings during the 1994 season.

Nix was signed by the Green Bay Packers on March 27, 1995. He was released by the Packers on April 27.

Nix signed with the Arizona Cardinals on June 2, 1995.

Nix was signed by the Minnesota Fighting Pike on May 2, 1996, and played for the team during the 1996 season. He played for the New York CityHawks from 1997 to 1998. He was traded to the Tampa Bay Storm for Kent Wells on June 18, 1997, but the trade was nixed when Wells failed to pass his physical. Nix was a member of the New England Sea Wolves during the 1999 off-season. He was released by the Sea Wolves on February 23, 1999.

== Personal life ==
Nix was arrested and cited in the past for failing to make child support payments.

His son, Roosevelt Nix, played in the NFL as a fullback for the Pittsburgh Steelers from 2015 to 2019.

Nix died on December 8, 2023.
