= Fran Papasedero =

American football player and coach (1969–2003)

No. 74
- Position: Offensive linemen / defensive linemen

Personal information
- Born: March 21, 1969; Boston, Massachusetts
- Died: June 19, 2003 (aged 34)

Career information
- College: Springfield

Career history

Playing
- Albany Firebirds (1993); Massachusetts Marauders (1994); St. Louis Stampede (1995–1996); Nashville Kats (1997)

Coaching
- Orlando Predators (Asst) (1998–2001); Orlando Predators (2002–2003)

Awards and highlights
- First Team All-Arena (1996)

Career AFL statistics
- Receptions: 9
- Yards: 56
- Touchdowns: 2
- Tackles: 82
- Sacks: 10.5
- Stats at ArenaFan.com

Head coaching record
- Regular season: 19–11 (.633)
- Postseason: 3–2 (.600)
- Career: 22–13 (.629)

Fran Papasedero (March 21, 1969 – June 19, 2003) was an Arena football player and coach. Papasedero coached the Arena Football League's Orlando Predators in the 2002 and 2003 seasons, having been appointed to replace Jay Gruden who wanted to resume his playing career at quarterback for the Predators. He had a 19–11 record and was 3–2 in the playoffs. Following the team's playoff defeat in June 2003, he died in an alcohol-related car accident.

Prior to his coaching career, he played for the Albany Firebirds (1993), Massachusetts Marauders (1994), St. Louis Stampede (1995–1996), and Nashville Kats (1997).
