= Thomas Bailey (American football) =

American football player (born 1971)

No. 18, 2, 5
- Position: Wide receiver

Personal information
- Born: December 6, 1971 (age 54); Dallas, Texas, U.S.
- Listed height: 6 ft 0 in (1.83 m)
- Listed weight: 196 lb (89 kg)

Career information
- High school: Enterprise (Enterprise, Alabama)
- College: Auburn (1991–1994)
- NFL draft: 1995: undrafted

Career history
- Cincinnati Bengals (1995); Rhein Fire (1997); Grand Rapids Rampage (1998–2001); Orlando Predators (2001); Buffalo Destroyers (2002); Detroit Fury (2003); Grand Rapids Rampage (2004)
- Stats at Pro Football Reference
- Stats at ArenaFan.com

Thomas James Bailey Jr. (born December 6, 1971) is an American former professional football player who was a wide receiver for one season with the Cincinnati Bengals of the National Football League (NFL). He played college football for the Auburn Tigers. He also played seven seasons in the Arena Football League (AFL) and one season in the World League of American Football (WLAF).

== Early life ==
Thomas James Bailey Jr. was born on December 6, 1971, in Dallas, Texas. He attended Enterprise High School in Enterprise, Alabama.

== College career ==
Bailey was a four-year letterman for the Auburn Tigers of Auburn University from 1991 to 1994. He caught seven passes for 76 yards in 1991 while also returning 42 punts for 528 yards and one touchdown and 24 kicks for 591 yards. He led the Southeastern Conference in punt returns and punt return yards that season. In 1992, Bailey recorded 18 receptions for 190 yards, 28 punt returns for 274 yards, and 11 kick returns for 209 yards. As a junior in 1994, he totaled 27 catches for 427 yards and four touchdowns, 27 punt returns for 210 yards, and 26 kick returns for 504 yards. He caught 41 passes for 550 yards and two touchdowns his senior year in 1994 while returning 28 punts for 158 yards and 13 kicks for 217 yards.

== Professional career ==
After going undrafted in the 1995 NFL draft, Bailey signed with the Cincinnati Bengals on April 26, 1995. He was released on August 27 and signed to the team's practice squad the next day. He was promoted to the active roster on October 31, 1995, and played in one game for the Bengals during the 1995 season. Bailey was released on August 18, 1996.

In February 1997, Bailey was selected by the Rhein Fire of the World League of American Football (WLAF) in the third round, with the 18th overall pick, of the 1997 WLAF draft. He was later placed on injured reserve. He was activated on May 30, 1997. During the 1997 WLAF season, Bailey recorded six receptions for 42 yards, 15 kickoff returns for 309 yards, and 11 punt returns for 128 yards.

Bailey played in all 14 games for the Grand Rapids Rampage of the Arena Football League (AFL) in 1998, totaling 51 receptions for 579 yards and eight touchdowns, 14 rushing attempts for 37 yards and four touchdowns, 31 kick returns for 633 yards and two touchdowns, seven solo tackles, 13 assisted tackles, one pass breakup, and two fumble recoveries. He was a wide receiver/linebacker during his time in the AFL as the league played under ironman rules. He appeared in all 14 games for the second consecutive year in 1999, accumulating 133 receptions for 1,578 yards and 33 touchdowns, 44 kick returns for 915 yards and two touchdowns, two rushing touchdowns, four solo tackles, four assisted tackles, and one pass breakup. Bailey and teammate Michael Baker were the first receiver duo in AFL history to both catch at least 100 passes in the same season. Bailey and Baker were named the "Killer B's" during their stint with the Rampage. Bailey's 133 receptions were the second most in the league that year. The Rampage finished the 1999 season with an 8–6 record and lost in the first round of the playoffs to the Albany Firebirds. He played in 13 games during the 2000 season, catching 105 passes for 1,202 yards and 18 touchdowns while also returning 37 kicks for 647 yards and one touchdown. The Rampage finished the year with a 6–8 record and lost in the first round of the playoffs for the second straight season, this time to the Nashville Kats by a score of 57–14. Bailey was placed on recallable waivers on March 13, 2001. He had knee surgery in March 2001. He re-signed with Grand Rapids on April 4 but was placed on recallable waivers again on April 23.

Bailey signed with the Orlando Predators of the AFL on May 8, 2001. He appeared in ten games for the Predators in 2001, recording 26 receptions for 317 yards and seven touchdowns, three kick returns for 72 yards and one touchdown, 14 solo tackles, one assisted tackle, one interception, and two pass breakups.

Bailey's was signed by the AFL's Buffalo Destroyers on November 21, 2001. He played in all 14 games for Buffalo during the 2002 season, totaling 23 catches for 316 yards and seven touchdowns, 15 solo tackles, 16 assisted tackles, and two interceptions. The Destroyers finished the season with a 6–8 record and lost in the first round of the playoffs to the Orlando Predators by a score of 32–27.

On November 14, 2002, Bailey was traded to the Detroit Fury for Evan Pilgrim. He played in six games for the Fury in 2003 and caught 24 passes for 240 yards and five touchdowns.

Bailey signed with the Grand Rapids Rampage on October 24, 2003. He was released on March 23. He was signed to the team's practice squad on April 28, 2004, and promoted to the active roster the next day. Bailey appeared in six games during his final AFL season in 2004, totaling 12 receptions for 133 yards, nine solo tackles, 18 assisted tackles, and one pass breakup.

== Personal life ==
Bailey lived in Grand Rapids, Michigan all year long while with the Rampage.
