= Ken Coffey =

American football player (born 1960)

No. 48
- Position: Safety

Personal information
- Born: November 7, 1960 (age 65); Rantoul, Illinois, U.S.
- Listed height: 6 ft 0 in (1.83 m)
- Listed weight: 193 lb (88 kg)

Career information
- High school: Big Spring (Big Spring, Texas)
- College: Texas State
- NFL draft: 1982: 9th round, 226th overall pick

Career history
- Washington Redskins (1983–1986)

Awards and highlights
- Super Bowl champion (XVII)

Career NFL statistics
- Interceptions: 7
- Fumble recoveries: 3
- Sacks: 1
- Stats at Pro Football Reference

Kenneth Eugene Coffey (born November 7, 1960) is an American former professional football player who was a safety for five seasons with the Washington Redskins of the National Football League (NFL). In 2024, he was appointed as the Senior Vice President and Chief Operating Officer (COO) of the NFL Alumni Association. He played college football for the Texas State Bobcats and was selected 226th overall in the ninth round of the 1982 NFL draft. His brother Wayne Coffey played in the NFL.
