= Kevin Carroll (gridiron football) =

American football player (born 1969)

Profile
- Position: Defensive lineman

Personal information
- Born: June 17, 1969 (age 57)
- Listed height: 6 ft 3 in (1.91 m)
- Listed weight: 270 lb (122 kg)

Career information
- College: Knoxville

Career history
- Cincinnati Rockers (1993); Toronto Argonauts (1994); Las Vegas Sting/Anaheim Piranhas (1994–1997); Grand Rapids Rampage (1999); Los Angeles Avengers (2000–2001)

Awards and highlights
- Second-team All-Arena (1996)

Career AFL statistics
- Tackles: 97.5
- Sacks: 8.5
- Pass breakups: 10
- Rushes: 61
- Rushing TDs: 12
- Stats at ArenaFan.com

Kevin Carroll (born June 17, 1969) is an American former professional football defensive lineman who played eight seasons in the Arena Football League with the Cincinnati Rockers, Las Vegas Sting/Anaheim Piranhas, Grand Rapids Rampage and Los Angeles Avengers. He played college football at Knoxville College. He was also a member of the Toronto Argonauts of the Canadian Football League. Carroll is from Hempstead, Texas.
