= Pete Chapman =

American football coach and college athletics administrator

Biographical details
- Born: 1949 or 1950
- Died: January 13, 2003 (aged 53–54); Iowa City, Iowa, U.S.
- Education: Nebraska

Coaching career (HC unless noted)
- 1979–1980: South Dakota State (assistant)
- 1981–1982: Yankton
- 1983–1988: Wayne State (NE)

Administrative career (AD unless noted)
- 1987–1999: Wayne State (NE)
- 1999–2003: Missouri Western

Head coaching record
- Overall: 28–54–1

Pete Chapman (1949 or 1950 – January 13, 2003) was an American football coach and college athletics administrator. He served as the head football coach at Yankton College in Yankton, South Dakota from 1981 and 1982 and Wayne State College in Wayne, Nebraska from 1983 to 1988, compiling a career college football coaching record of 28–54–1. Chapman was the athletic director at Wayne State from 1987 to 1999 and Missouri Western State University from 1999 to 2003.

Chapman died of cancer on January 13, 2003.

== Legacy ==
Wayne State inducted Chapman into its athletic hall of fame in 2002 and renamed its baseball and softball fields the "Pete Chapman Baseball and Softball Complex" in 2006. Following Chapman's death in 2003, Wayne State established the "Pete Chapman Memorial Scholarship" for student-athletes.

== Head coaching record ==
Year	Team	Overall	Conference	Standing	Bowl/playoffs
Yankton Greyhounds (South Dakota Intercollegiate Conference) (1981–1982)
1981	Yankton	4–6	NA	NA	
1982	Yankton	8–2	5–2	3rd	
Yankton:		12–8	5–2		
Wayne State Wildcats (Central States Intercollegiate Conference) (1983–1988)
1983	Wayne State	1–9	1–6	T–7th	
1984	Wayne State	8–3	5–2	T–2nd	
1985	Wayne State	4–6	3–4	T–4th	
1986	Wayne State	2–9	0–7	8th	
1987	Wayne State	1–8–1	1–5–1	7th	
1988	Wayne State	0–11	0–7	8th	
Wayne State:		16–46–1	10–31–1		
Total:		28–54–1			
