= Jerome Brown (arena football) =

American football player (born 1965)

Profile
- Position: Offensive lineman / Defensive lineman

Personal information
- Born: November 27, 1965 (age 60)
- Listed height: 6 ft 4 in (1.93 m)
- Listed weight: 290 lb (132 kg)

Career information
- College: Mississippi
- NFL draft: 1993: undrafted

Career history
- Cleveland Browns (1993)*; Albany Firebirds (1994–1997); Grand Rapids Rampage (1998); New Jersey Red Dogs (1999)
- * Offseason or practice squad member only

Awards and highlights
- Second-team All-Arena (1996)

Career AFL statistics
- Tackles: 57.5
- Sacks: 19.5
- Pass breakups: 13
- Forced fumbles: 2
- Fumble recoveries: 2
- Stats at ArenaFan.com

Jerome Brown (born November 27, 1965) is an American former professional football lineman who played six seasons in the Arena Football League (AFL) with the Albany Firebirds, Grand Rapids Rampage and New Jersey Red Dogs. He played college football at Coahoma Community College and the University of Mississippi.

== Early life and college ==
Jerome Brown was born on November 27, 1965. He first played college football at Coahoma Community College. He was then a member of the Ole Miss Rebels of the University of Mississippi from 1990 to 1992 and a two-year letterman from 1991 to 1992. Brown returned one interception 36 yards for a touchdown in 1991. He only started six games his senior year in 1992 due to injury but still led the team in sacks with four.

== Professional career ==
Pre-draft measurables
Height	Weight	Arm length	Hand span
6 ft 3 1/4 in (1.91 m)	292 lb (132 kg)	35 1/8 in (0.89 m)	9 in (0.23 m)
All values from NFL Combine

Brown signed with the Cleveland Browns in April 1993 after going undrafted in the 1993 NFL draft. On August 26, 1993, it was reported that he had been waived.

Brown signed with the Albany Firebirds of the Arena Football League (AFL) on May 2, 1994. He played in ten games for the Firebirds during the 1994 season, recording six solo tackles, three assisted tackles, one sack, four pass breakups, and three receptions for 36 yards. He was an offensive lineman/defensive lineman during his time in the AFL as the league played under ironman rules. Brown appeared in all 12 games in 1995, totaling 16 solo tackle, four assisted tackles, eight sacks, two pass breakups, and one catch for 20 yards. The Firebirds finished the year with a 7–5 record and lost in the semifinals to the Tampa Bay Storm by a score of 56–49. He played in all 14 games during the 1996 season, recording 11 solo tackles, 11 assisted tackles, eight sacks, one forced fumble, one fumble recovery, one pass breakup, and one reception for two yards and a touchdown. The Barnstormers went 10–4 but lost in the semifinals for the second year in a row, this time to the Iowa Barnstormers 62–55. Brown was named second-team All-Arena for his performance during the 1996 season after leading the league in sacks. He played in ten games in 1997, accumulating three solo tackles, six assisted tackles, 0.5 sacks, one fumble recovery, one reception for 17 yards, and one carry for a one-yard touchdown.

On December 17, 1997, Brown was selected by the Grand Rapids Rampage in a dispersal draft. He appeared in six games for the Rampage during the 1998, totaling one solo tackle, four assisted tackles, two sacks, one forced fumble, and one pass breakup.

Brown played in ten games for the New Jersey Red Dogs of the AFL during the 1999 season, recording four solo tackles, five assisted tackles, five pass breakups, and five receptions for 59 yards.
