= ArenaBowl X =

Tampa Bay Storm (2nd)	Iowa Barnstormers (1st)
42	38
	1	2	3	4	Total
TB	13	15	7	7	42
IOWA	14	14	3	7	38
- Date: August 26, 1996
- Stadium: Iowa Veterans Memorial Auditorium; Des Moines, Iowa
- MVP: Stevie Thomas, WR/LB, Tampa Bay: Leonard Conley, WR/LB, Iowa (Ironman of the Game)
- Attendance: 11,411
- Winning coach: Tim Marcum
- Losing coach: John Gregory

TV in the United States
- Network: ESPN
- Announcers: Todd Christensen, Kirk Herbstreit, Mike Golic

ArenaBowl X was the Arena Football League's tenth ArenaBowl. The game featured the #2 Tampa Bay Storm of the National Conference against the #1 Iowa Barnstormers of the American Conference. Both teams ended their regular seasons at 12–2, yet Iowa had a better conference record (7–2 to 6–2). For the Storm, they were hoping to get their fourth championship title in six overall appearances, while the Barnstormers (in only their second season) were trying to win their first league championship game.

== Game summary ==
In the first quarter, Tampa Bay struck first with quarterback Jay Gruden completing a 12-yard touchdown pass to OL/DL Lynn Rowland, yet the Barnstormers took the lead with quarterback Kurt Warner completing a 16-yard touchdown pass to WR/LB Chris Spencer and a 30-yard touchdown pass to OS Lamont Cooper. The Storm would wrap up the period with Gruden completing a 30-yard touchdown pass to OS George LaFrance (with a failed PAT).

In the second quarter, Iowa increased its lead with Warner completing a nine-yard touchdown pass to WR/DB Willis Jacox, yet Tampa Bay took control with Gruden completing a 35-yard touchdown pass to WR/LB Stevie Thomas. Afterwards, Thomas would return an interception nine yards for a touchdown. The Barnstormers would wrap up the half with FB/LB Ron Moran getting a one-yard touchdown run.

In the third quarter, the Storm regained the lead with Gruden completing a 21-yard touchdown pass to FB/LB Ivan Caesar, yet Iowa responded with kicker Mike Black getting a 32-yard field goal.

In the fourth quarter, the Barnstormers reclaimed its lead with Warner and Spencer hooking up with each other again on a four-yard touchdown pass, yet Tampa Bay retook the lead with Gruden and Thomas hooking up with each other again on a seven-yard touchdown pass. Afterwards, Warner would lead Iowa on a late game drive to the Storm's one-yard, yet on four-straight downs, Tampa Bay kept the Barnstormers out of the end zone.

With the win, the Storm claimed its fourth title in six seasons.

== Scoring summary ==
1st Quarter

- TB - 12-yard touchdown pass from Gruden to Rowland (Cimadevilla kick)
- IOW - 16-yard touchdown pass from Warner to Spencer (Black kick)
- IOW - 30-yard touchdown pass from Warner to Cooper (Black kick)
- TB - 30-yard touchdown pass from Gruden to LaFrance (Cimadevilla kick failed)

2nd Quarter

- IOW - 9-yard touchdown pass from Warner to Jacox (Black kick)
- TB - 35-yard touchdown pass from Gruden to Thomas (Cimadevilla kick)
- TB - 9-yard interception return by Thomas (Gruden pass)
- IOW - 1-yard touchdown run by Moran (Black)

3rd Quarter

- TB - 21-yard touchdown pass from Gruden to Caesar (Cimadevilla kick)
- IOW - 32-yard field goal by Black

4th Quarter

- IOW - 4-yard touchdown pass from Warner to Spencer (Black kick)
- TB - 7-yard touchdown pass from Gruden to Thomas (Cimadevilla kick)

== Trivia ==
- On the Arena Football League's 20 Greatest Highlights Countdown, this game was ranked #3.

== In popular culture ==
This game was prominently featured in Warner's 2021 biopic, American Underdog.
