= Anaheim Piranhas =

Arena football team

Logo

General information
- Founded: 1994
- Folded: 1997
- Headquartered: Arrowhead Pond in Anaheim, California
- Colors: Black, red, light green, and white

Personnel
- Owner: Robert Zinngrabe
- Head coach: Mike Hohensee

Team history
- Las Vegas Sting (1994–1995); Anaheim Piranhas (1996–1997)

Home fields
- MGM Grand Garden Arena (1994); Thomas & Mack Center (1995); Arrowhead Pond of Anaheim (1996–1997)

League / conference affiliations
- Arena Football League (1994–1997): American Conference (1994–1997); Western Division (1994–1997)

Playoff appearances (2)
- 1994, 1996

The Anaheim Piranhas were a professional arena football team that played in the Arena Football League from 1994 to 1997. They played their home games at Arrowhead Pond in Anaheim, California. The team was originally known as the Las Vegas Sting, prior to moving to Anaheim in 1996. The team was owned by future Arena Football League commissioner C. David Baker.

== History ==
=== Las Vegas Sting (1994–1995) ===
The Las Vegas Sting was a team which competed in the Arena Football League during the 1994 and 1995 seasons. Their home games in 1994 were played in the MGM Grand Garden Arena, and they were moved to the Thomas & Mack Center on the campus of the University of Nevada, Las Vegas for the 1995 season. The team was relocated to Anaheim, California prior to the start of the 1996 season, at which time it was renamed the Anaheim Piranhas.

=== Anaheim Piranhas (1996–1997) ===
The Piranhas played their home games at Arrowhead Pond, also the home of the Mighty Ducks of Anaheim of the National Hockey League. The team was not an overwhelmingly successful draw in the high-overhead Southern California market and folded after the conclusion of the 1997 season. The arena (now known as the Honda Center) would once again be the home of an AFL franchise with the launching of the Los Angeles Kiss in 2014.

== Notable players ==
=== Arena Football Hall of Famers ===
Las Vegas Sting / Anaheim Piranhas Hall of Famers
No.	Name	Year inducted	Position(s)	Years w/ Sting/Piranhas
??	Sam Hernandez	2011	OL/DL	1994–1997
--	Mike Hohensee	2012	Head Coach	1997

=== All-Arena players ===
The following Sting/Piranhas players were named to All-Arena Teams:

- FB/LB Kevin Carroll (1)
- OL/DL Sam Hernandez (2)
- DS Carlton Johnson (2), Rodney Mazion (2)
- K Ian Howfield (1)
- OL/DL Dan Sileo (1)

== Season-by-season ==
ArenaBowl champions	ArenaBowl appearance	Division champions	Playoff berth

Season	League	Conference	Division	Regular season			Postseason results
Season	League	Conference	Division	Finish	Wins	Losses	Postseason results
Las Vegas Sting
1994	AFL	American	—	4th	5	7	Lost Quarterfinals (Albany) 49–30
1995	AFL	American	Western	3rd	6	6	
Anaheim Piranhas
1996	AFL	American	Western	2nd	9	5	Lost Quarterfinals (Tampa Bay) 30–16
1997	AFL	American	Western	3rd	2	12	
Total					22	30	(includes only regular season)
Total					0	2	(includes only the postseason)
Total					24	32	(includes both regular season and postseason)
