= Tracey Perkins =

American football player (born 1968)

No. 5, 24
- Position: Defensive back

Personal information
- Born: August 28, 1968 (age 58); Houston, Texas, U.S.
- Listed height: 5 ft 10 in (1.78 m)
- Listed weight: 180 lb (82 kg)

Career information
- College: Lamar
- NFL draft: 1989: undrafted

Career history
- Tampa Bay Storm (1991–1999); Sacramento Surge (1992); San Jose SaberCats (2001)

Awards and highlights
- 4× ArenaBowl champion (1991, 1993, 1995, 1996); First-team All-Arena (1997); Second-team All-Arena (1996); AFL Defensive Player of the Year (1997)

Career AFL statistics
- Tackles: 373
- Interceptions: 37
- Touchdowns: 3
- Stats at ArenaFan.com

Tracey Perkins (born August 28, 1968) is an American former professional football defensive back in the Arena Football League (AFL). He played college football at Lamar. Perkins was the 1997 Arena Football League Defensive Player of the Year Award winner.

Perkins played for the Tampa Bay Storm and San Jose SaberCats.

== College career ==
Perkins attended Lamar University in Beaumont, Texas, where he lettered as a member of the football team during the 1985–1988 seasons.
