= St. Louis Stampede =

Arena football team

Logo

General information
- Founded: 1995
- Folded: 1996
- Headquartered: Kiel Center in St. Louis, Missouri
- Colors: Black, red, orange, gold, white

Personnel
- Head coach: Dave Ewart

Team history
- St. Louis Stampede (1995–1996)

Home fields
- Kiel Center (1995–1996)

League / conference affiliations
- Arena Football League (1995–1996): American Conference (1995–1996); Central (1995–1996)

Playoff appearances (2)
- 1995, 1996

The St. Louis Stampede were a professional arena football team based in St. Louis, Missouri. The team was a member of the Central Division of the American Conference, in the Arena Football League (AFL). The Stampede competed in the 1995 and 1996 seasons, playing their home games in the Kiel Center (since renamed the Enterprise Center), also the home of the St. Louis Blues of the National Hockey League.

The Stampede were coached by Earle Bruce during the 1995 season, and for the first 4 games of the 1996 season, before he announced his resignation to spend more time with his family. The Stampede qualified for the playoffs during both seasons of their existence, but folded after the completion of their second season in 1996. Reaching the playoffs both seasons, they scored 49 points in two first-round games. However, they lost both.

== Season-by-season ==
Season records
Season	W	L	T	Finish	Playoff results
1995	9	3	0		Lost Quarterfinals (Albany 51-49)
1996	8	6	0		Lost Quarterfinals (Iowa 52-49)
Totals	17	11	0	(including playoffs)	

== Players of note ==
=== Arena Football Hall of Famers ===
St. Louis Stampede Hall of Famers
No.	Name	Year Inducted	Position(s)	Years w/ Stampede
7	Darryl Hammond	2013	WR/LB	1995-96

=== All-Arena players ===
The following Stampede players were named to All-Arena Teams:

- FB/LB Bernard Hall (1)
- WR/LB Darryl Hammond (2)
- OL/DL Fran Papasedero (1)

== Coaches of note ==
=== Head coaches ===
Note: Statistics are correct through the end of the 1996 Arena Football League season.

Name	Term	Regular season				Playoffs		Awards
Name	Term	W	L	T	Win%	W	L	Awards
Earle Bruce	1995–1996	11	5	0	.688	0	1	
Dave Ewart	1996	6	4	0	.600	0	1	
