= Houston ThunderBears =

Arena football team

- Founded: 1996
- Folded: 2001
- Team history: Texas Terror (1996–1997); Houston ThunderBears (1998–2001)
- Based in: Compaq Center in Houston, Texas
- Home arenas: Compaq Center (1996–2000); Traveling team in 2001
- League: Arena Football League (1996–2001): National Conference (1996); Southern Division (1996); American Conference (1997–2001); Central Division (1997–2000); Western Division (2001)
- Colors: Navy, orange, teal

Personnel
- Head coach: Steve Thonn

Championships
- Division titles (1): 1998; Prior to 1992, the AFL did not have divisions

Playoff appearances (1)
- 1998

The Houston ThunderBears were a professional arena football team based in Houston, Texas. The team finished the 2001 season as a member of the Western Division of the American Conference of the Arena Football League (AFL). The team joined the AFL in 1996 as the expansion Texas Terror. After their first two years of existence, the franchise changed their name to the Houston ThunderBears. Plagued with attendance problems through the majority of their existence, the team folded in 2001. Home games were played at the Compaq Center.

The six seasons in which the team played coincided with the absence of the National Football League from the Houston market; the Houston Oilers had announced their departure from the city after the 1996 season, and the Houston Texans began play in 2002. Many of the same issues that led to the Oilers' departure, including poor attendance and a decline in the price of oil that drove Houston's economy, also affected the Thunderbears.

== History ==
=== Texas Terror (1996–1997) ===
The Texas Terror was a franchise in the Arena Football League (AFL). The Terror played in the 1996 and 1997 Arena seasons. Their home games were played at the Summit also at that time home to the Houston Rockets of the NBA. The Terror's logo appeared to be a stylized representation of Frankenstein's monster holding a football.

The 1996 season was an unmitigated disaster, with the Terror notching only one win, coming against another first-year team, the ill-fated Minnesota Fighting Pike. The 1997 season was considerably better with a record of 6-8, but the attendance was abysmal, especially given the size of the Houston market. After the season, the decision was made to remake the franchise and scrap both the existing logo and team name, and the team was renamed the Houston ThunderBears.

=== Houston ThunderBears (1998–2001) ===
The Houston ThunderBears were a continuation of the Texas Terror franchise (1996–1997) of the AFL under a new name, logo, and color scheme. The team still played its home games at the Compaq Center. 1998, the first year as the ThunderBears, was the high-water mark in team history, in which they recorded their only winning season and sole playoff appearance (a loss to Arizona). The two subsequent seasons saw a decline in both on-field performance and attendance. For the 2001 season, then owner Leslie Alexander (owner of the NBA's Houston Rockets), sold the franchise back to the AFL. Although still called the Houston ThunderBears, the team played none of its home games in Houston. The league decided to use them as a showcase team to stimulate interest in new markets, playing in cities such as Bismarck, North Dakota, Madison, Wisconsin, and Charleston, West Virginia. Four AFL/af2 franchises (the Utah Blaze, Fresno Frenzy, Central Valley Coyotes, and Lubbock Renegades) emerged from some of the markets that the ThunderBears played in. The team was ultimately contracted along with three other AFL franchises in the 2001–2002 offseason.

== Season-by-season ==
Season records
Season	W	L	T	Finish	Playoff results
Texas Terror
1996	1	13	0	4th NC Southern	--
1997	6	8	0	3rd AC Central	--
Houston Thunderbears
1998	8	6	0	1st AC Central	Lost 1st Round (Arizona 36-50)
1999	4	10	0	4th AC Central	--
2000	3	11	0	4th AC Central	--
2001	3	11	0	4th AC Western	--
Totals	25	60	0	(including playoffs)	

== Notable players ==
=== Arena Football Hall of Famers ===
Houston ThunderBears Hall of Famers
No.	Name	Year Inducted	Position(s)	Years w/ ThunderBears
13	Clint Dolezel	2012	QB	1997–1999

=== Individual awards ===
Lineman of the Year
Season	Player	Position
1997	Carlos Fowler	OL/DL

Breakout Player of the Year
Season	Player	Position
2000	Ben Bronson	OS

=== All-Arena players ===
The following ThunderBears players were named to All-Arena Teams:

- WR/DB Rodney Blackshear (1)
- OL/DL Carlos Fowler (1)

=== All-Ironman players ===
The following ThunderBears players were named to All-Ironman Teams:

- WR/DB Rodney Blackshear (1), Sedrick Robinson (1)

=== All-Rookie players ===
The following ThunderBears players were named to All-Rookie Teams:

- FB/LB Terrence Melton
- WR/DB Sedrick Robinson

== Notes ==
- The Terror and ThunderBears both appeared on the game EA Sports Arena Football as hidden bonus teams.
