= Minnesota Fighting Pike =

Arena football team

Logo

General information
- Founded: 1996
- Folded: 1996
- Headquartered: Target Center in Minneapolis, Minnesota
- Colors: Green, gold, white

Personnel
- Owner: Tom Scallen
- Head coach: Ray Jauch
- President: Tom Scallen

Team history
- Minnesota Fighting Pike (1996)

Home fields
- Target Center (1996)

League / conference affiliations
- Arena Football League (1996): American Conference (1996); Western (1996)

The Minnesota Fighting Pike were an Arena football team based in Minneapolis, Minnesota. They joined the Arena Football League (AFL) in 1996 as an expansion team. The Fighting Pike were the first ever attempt at an arena/indoor football team in the state of Minnesota. The owner of the Fighting Pike was Tom Scallen. The Fighting Pike played at the Target Center in Minneapolis, Minnesota. The team colors were green and gold. In a 2012 AFL Poll, the Fighting Pike were voted as the 8th greatest nickname in AFL history.

== Franchise history ==
In November 1995, the announced that they would be nicknamed the "Fighting Pike" and that Art Haege was named the team's head coach.

During the team's first tryout, Haege walked out, stating he was going "Back to Iowa." The next day, Haege faxed in his resignation to team owner Tom Scallen.

The Pike were 0-7 at home, and the average attendance for the seven home games was 8,894.

The roster was full of players who had played at the University of Minnesota or other Minnesota colleges and universities. Tony Levine, a former Golden Gopher, joined the team and received 8 passes for a total of 83 yards and 1 touchdown. Former Gopher Rickey Foggie was the quarterback and he struggled adapting to the Arena Football League after many years in the Canadian Football League. Once during the season he was benched in favor of Southwest State's Jeff Loots, who threw four interceptions in a game. Loots was playing on his third expansion team in three seasons. Another player from Southwest State was Alvin Ashley. The best-known ex-Pike is kicker Mike Vanderjagt, later a star in the CFL and NFL.

Ray Jauch was the head coach. He was assisted by John Coatta Jr. on offense and Frank Haege on defense.

The team's lack of exposure or advertising was the key reason for the team's folding at the end of the 1996 season. The team did not have a regional television deal to promote their games or have the games advertised in newspapers and other media.

The Pike's final game of the season against the Memphis Pharaohs was played in Tupelo, Mississippi, because the Pharaohs had been evicted from their arena.

The Pike's official mascot was a giant Pike named "Tackle." He was known to "dive" into a promotional hot tub at the arena.

== Legacy ==
In 2024, a revival of the Arena Football League brought it the Minnesota Myth, a team which played only two games (one at Target Center) before folding themselves.

== Players ==
=== Final roster ===
Minnesota Fighting Pike roster
Quarterbacks: 14 Rickey Foggie; 11 Jeff Loots; Running backs: -- Harry Jackson; -- William Freeney; Wide receivers: -- David Andrews; -- Alvin Ashley; -- Reggie Brown; -- Fernando Evans; -- Wayne Hawkins; -- Eric Jennings; -- Bruce LaSane; -- Tony Levine	Offensive linemen/Defensive linemen: -- Scott Dolfi; -- Jon Garber; -- Sheldon Haliburton; -- Brian Krulikowski; -- Roosevelt Nix; -- Mike Sunvold; -- Franklin Thomas; Linebackers: -- Norman Brown; -- Nate Johnson III; -- Macey Stephens; -- Kevin Wolfolk	Defensive backs: -- Joe Fuller; -- Kevin Guy; -- Tony Harris; -- Adrian Lunsford; -- D.J. McCarthy; -- Randy Smith; -- Tony Young; Kickers: -- Ty Stewart; -- Mike Vanderjagt; rookies in italics Roster updated August 16, 2012; 32 Active, 0 Inactive, 0 PS

== Coaches ==
=== Head coaches ===
Name	Term	Regular season				Playoffs		Awards
Name	Term	W	L	T	Win%	W	L	Awards
Ray Jauch	1996	4	10	0	.286	0	0	

=== Coaching staff ===
Minnesota Fighting Pike staff
Front office: Owner/President – Tom Scallen; Head coach: Head coach – Ray Jauch; Offensive coaches: Offensive coordinator – John Coatta Jr.	Defensive coaches: Defensive coordinator – Frank Haege

== 1996 season results ==
Arena Bowl Champions	Conference champions	Division champions	Wild card berth	League leader

Season	Team	League	Conference	Division	Regular season				Postseason results
Season	Team	League	Conference	Division	Finish	Wins	Losses	Ties	Postseason results
1996	1996	AFL	American	Western	4th	4	10	0	
Totals						4	10	0	All-time regular season record (1996)
Totals						0	0	-	All-time postseason record (1996)
Totals						4	10	0	All-time regular season and postseason record (1996)

Date	Opponent	Home/Away	Result
April 27	Texas Terror	Away	W 36–24
May 4	Iowa Barnstormers	Home	L 43–59
May 10	St. Louis Stampede	Home	L 22–59
May 18	Albany Firebirds	Away	L 30–85
May 24	Tampa Bay Storm	Home	L 16–41
May 31	Anaheim Piranhas	Home	L 23–49
June 7	Arizona Rattlers	Home	L 27–59
June 15	Florida Bobcats	Away	L 28–63
June 28	Milwaukee Mustangs	Home	L 49–61
July 5	Connecticut Coyotes	Away	W 44–40
July 12	Orlando Predators	Away	L 12–56
July 19	Texas Terror	Home	L 51–54
July 26	San Jose SaberCats	Away	W 40–31
August 3	Memphis Pharaohs	Away	W 50–25

== Statistics ==
=== Team leaders ===
- Leading rusher: Harry Jackson 22 carries, 26 yards and 0 touchdowns
- Leading passer: Rickey Foggie 224-443 for 2,269 yards, 40 touchdowns and 16 interceptions.
- Leading receiver: Reggie Brown 79 catches, 964 yards 17, touchdowns

=== Offense ===
==== Passing ====
Place	Player Name	Completions	Attempts	Comp%	Yards	TD's	INT's	Rating
1	Rickey Foggie	224	443	50.6%	2269	40	16	73.1
2	Jeff Loots	40	75	53.3%	484	7	8	57.2

==== Rushing ====
Place	Player Name	Car	Yards	Avg	TD's
1	Harry Jackson	22	26	1.2	0
2	Guy Howard	11	19	1.7	0
3	William Freeney	5	18	3.6	0
4	Rickey Foggie	17	17	1	4
5	Bruce LaSane	6	12	2	0
6	Wayne Hawkins	3	12	4	0
7	Willie Jennings	8	9	1.1	0
8	Kevin Wolfolk	2	8	4	0
9	Norman Brown	1	2	2	0
10	David Andrews	1	2	2	0
11	Jeff Loots	3	−2	−0.7	0

==== Receiving ====
Place	Player Name	Rec.	Yards	Avg	TD's
1	Reggie Brown	79	964	12.2	17
2	Alvin Ashley	69	971	14	19
3	Eric Jennings	29	230	7.9	0
4	Bruce LaSane	22	275	12.5	6
5	Wayne Hawkins	15	164	10.9	1
6	Harry Jackson	15	128	8.5	1
7	Kevin Guy	9	96	10.6	0
8	Tony Levine	8	83	10.4	1
9	Guy Howard	5	22	4.4	0
10	Franklin Thomas	3	43	14.3	0
11	D.J. McCarthy	2	53	26.5	1
12	Fernando Evans	2	23	11.5	0
13	Tony Harris	2	15	7.5	0
14	Nate Johnson III	2	14	7	0
15	Tony Young	1	45	45	1
16	Tracey Martin	1	14	14	0
17	Adrian Lunsford	1	7	7	0
18	Norman Brown	1	5	5	0

==== Touchdowns ====
Place	Player Name	TD's	Rush	Rec	Ret	Pts
1	Alvin Ashley	19	0	19	0	114
2	Reggie Brown	17	0	17	0	102
2	Bruce LaSane	6	0	6	0	36
4	Rickey Foggie	4	4	0	0	24
5	Adrian Lunsford	2	0	0	2	12
6	Wayne Hawkins	1	0	1	0	6
7	Harry Jackson	1	0	1	0	6
8	Tony Levine	1	0	1	0	6
9	D.J. McCarthy	1	0	1	0	6
10	Tony Young	1	0	1	0	6

=== Defense ===
Place	Player Name	Tackles	Solo	Assisted	Sack	Solo	Assisted	INT	Yards	TD's	Long
1	Kevin Guy	52.5	49	7	0	0	0	2	0	0	
2	Tony Harris	43.5	41	5	0	0	0	1	10	0	
3	Adrian Lunsford	41	37	8	0	0	0	7	29	2	
4	Alvin Ashley	28.5	27	3	0	0	0	2	42	1	
5	Brian Krulikowski	25	19	12	1.5	1	1	0	0	0	
6	Nate Johnson III	23	19	8	4.5	4	1	0	0	0	
7	Norman Brown	22.5	21	3	0	0	0	0	0	0	
8	Mike Sunvold	21.5	18	7	4	4	0	0	0	0	
9	Harry Jackson	19	18	2	0	0	0	0	0	0	
10	Franklin Thomas	16	15	2	0	0	0	0	0	0	
11	Bruce LaSane	15.5	13	5	0	0	0	0	0	0	
12	Guy Howard	14.5	12	5	0	0	0	0	0	0	
13	Joe Fuller	11.5	11	1	0	0	0	1	13	0	
14	Roosevelt Nix	10	8	4	0	0	0	0	0	0	
15	Kevin Wolfolk	9.5	9	1	0	0	0	0	0	0	
16	Reggie Brown	9	8	2	0	0	0	0	0	0	
17	Scott Dolfi	8	7	2	0	0	0	0	0	0	
18	Randy Smith	6.5	6	1	0	0	0	1	21	0	
19	William Freeney	5	5	0	0	0	0	0	0	0	
20	Wayne Hawkins	4	4	0	0	0	0	0	0	0	
21	Sheldon Haliburton	4	3	2	0	0	0	0	0	0	
22	Tony Levine	4	4	0	0	0	0	0	0	0	
23	Ty Stewart	2	2	0	0	0	0	0	0	0	
24	D.J. McCarthy	2	2	0	0	0	0	1	0	0	
25	Jeff Loots	2	2	0	0	0	0	0	0	0	
26	Tony Young	2	2	0	0	0	0	0	0	0	
27	Jon Garber	2	2	0	0	0	0	0	0	0	
28	Fernando Evans	1.5	1	1	0	0	0	0	0	0	
22	Ricky Foggie	1	1	0	0	0	0	0	0	0	
23	Eric Jennings	1	1	0	0	0	0	0	0	0	
24	Macey Stephens	0	0	0	0	0	0	0	0	0	

=== Special teams ===
==== Kick return ====
Place	Player Name	Ret	Yards	TD's	Long	Avg	Ret	Yards	TD's	Long	Avg
1	Alvin Ashley	52	951	0							
2	Adrian Lunsford	22	393	2							
3	Reggie Brown	3	23	0							
4	Tony Harris	2	26	0							
5	Wayne Hawkins	2	9	0							
6	Kevin Guy	2	0	0							
7	Eric Jennings	1	0	0							

==== Kicking ====
Place	Player Name	Extra pt.	Extra pt. Att.	FG	FGA	Pct.	Pts
1	Ty Stewart	37	43	16	52	30.8	87
2	Mike Vanderjagt	7	10	2	6	33.3	13

== 1996 regular season ==
=== Week 1: vs Texas Terror ===
at The Summit, Houston, Texas

Attendance: 4,520

=== Week 2: vs Iowa Barnstormers ===
at the Target Center, Minneapolis, Minnesota

Attendance: 14,840

=== Week 3: vs St. Louis Stampede ===
at the Target Center, Minneapolis, Minnesota

Attendance: 8,726

=== Week 4: vs Albany Firebirds ===
at the Times Union Center, Albany, New York

Attendance: 11,712

=== Week 5: vs Tampa Bay Storm ===
at the Target Center, Minneapolis, Minnesota

Attendance: 7,781

=== Week 6: vs Anaheim Piranhas ===
at the Target Center, Minneapolis, Minnesota

Attendance: 8,117

=== Week 7: vs Arizona Rattlers ===
at the Target Center, Minneapolis, Minnesota

Attendance: 8,207

=== Week 8: vs Florida Bobcats ===
at the West Palm Beach Auditorium, West Palm Beach, Florida

Attendance: 4,450

=== Week 10: vs Milwaukee Mustangs ===
at the Target Center, Minneapolis, Minnesota

Attendance: 7,207

=== Week 11: vs Connecticut Coyotes ===
at the Hartford Civic Center, Hartford, Connecticut

Attendance: 9,249

=== Week 12: vs Orlando Predators ===
at the Amway Arena, Orlando, Florida

Attendance: 15,107

=== Week 13: vs Texas Terror ===
at the Target Center, Minneapolis, Minnesota

Attendance: 7,380

=== Week 14: vs San Jose SaberCats ===
at the HP Pavilion, San Jose, California

Attendance: 14,901

=== Week 15: vs Memphis Pharaohs ===
at the BancorpSouth Arena, Tupelo, Mississippi

Attendance: 4,520

== Other media ==
- The team appeared on the game EA Sports Arena Football as a hidden bonus team.

== Notes ==
- All game scores and statistics are from arenafan.com
