= 1996 Arena Football League season =

- League: Arena Football League
- Sport: Arena football
- Duration: April 25, 1996 – August 26, 1996

ArenaBowl X
- Champions: Tampa Bay Storm
- Runners-up: Iowa Barnstormers
- Finals MVP: Stevie Thomas, TB

AFL seasons
- ← 1995 1997 →

National: Eastern, Southern
American: Western, Central

The 1996 Arena Football League season was the tenth season of the Arena Football League. It was succeeded by 1997. The league champions were the Tampa Bay Storm, who defeated the Iowa Barnstormers in ArenaBowl X. The AFL finally stabilized its scheduled number of games. It expanded to a 14-game season, which would remain until 2003. Previously, the scheduled number of games had not stayed the same for more than three years.

== Team movement ==
The Texas Terror joined the league as an expansion team.

Meanwhile, the Fort Worth Cavalry were relocated to Minneapolis and became the Minnesota Fighting Pike; the Las Vegas Sting moved to Anaheim, California, becoming the Anaheim Piranhas, and the Miami Hooters were renamed to the Florida Bobcats. The franchise rights to the Denver Dynamite were sold and the team announced they would return in 1997 as the Nashville Kats

== Standings ==
Team	Overall			Division		
Team	Wins	Losses	Percentage	Wins	Losses	Percentage
National Conference
Eastern Division
Albany Firebirds	10	4	0.714	4	0	1.000
Charlotte Rage	5	9	0.357	2	2	0.500
Connecticut Coyotes	2	12	0.143	0	4	0.000
Southern Division
Tampa Bay Storm	12	2	0.857	5	1	0.833
Orlando Predators	9	5	0.643	5	1	0.833
Florida Bobcats	6	8	0.429	2	4	0.333
Texas Terror	1	13	0.071	0	6	0.000
American Conference
Central Division
Iowa Barnstormers	12	2	0.857	4	2	0.667
Milwaukee Mustangs	10	4	0.714	5	1	0.833
St. Louis Stampede	8	6	0.571	3	3	0.500
Memphis Pharaohs	0	14	0.000	0	6	0.000
Western Division
Arizona Rattlers	11	3	0.786	3	2	0.600
Anaheim Piranhas	9	5	0.643	4	1	0.800
San Jose SaberCats	6	8	0.429	1	4	0.200
Minnesota Fighting Pike	4	10	0.286	1	2	0.333

- Green indicates clinched playoff berth
- Blue indicates division champion
- Grey indicates best regular season record

== Playoffs ==
Quarterfinals
1	Iowa	52
8	St. Louis	49
4	Albany	70
5	Milwaukee	58
2	Tampa Bay	30
7	Anaheim	16
3	Arizona	65
6	Orlando	48

Semifinals
1	Iowa	62
4	Albany	55
2	Tampa Bay	55
3	Arizona	54

ArenaBowl X
1	Iowa	38
2	Tampa Bay	42

== All-Arena team ==
Position	First team	Second team
Quarterback	Kurt Warner, Iowa	Mike Perez, Albany
Fullback/Linebacker	Bernard Hall, St. Louis	Kevin Carroll, Anaheim
Wide receiver/Defensive back	Darryl Hammond, St. Louis; Barry Wagner, Orlando	Randy Gatewood, Arizona; David McLeod, Albany
Wide receiver/Linebacker	Hunkie Cooper, Arizona	Stevie Thomas, Tampa Bay
Offensive specialist	Eddie Brown, Albany	Willis Jacox, Iowa
Offensive lineman/Defensive lineman	Sam Hernandez, Anaheim; Fran Papasedero, St. Louis; Kent Wells, Tampa Bay	Jerome Brown, Albany; Ralph Jarvis, Milwaukee; Sylvester Bembery, Tampa Bay
Defensive specialist	Rodney Mazion, Anaheim; Patrick McGuirk, San Jose	Carlton Johnson, Anaheim; Tracey Perkins, Tampa Bay
Kicker	Kenny Stucker, Milwaukee	Pete Elezovic, Albany
