= West Palm Beach Christian Convention Center =

Arena in Florida, United States

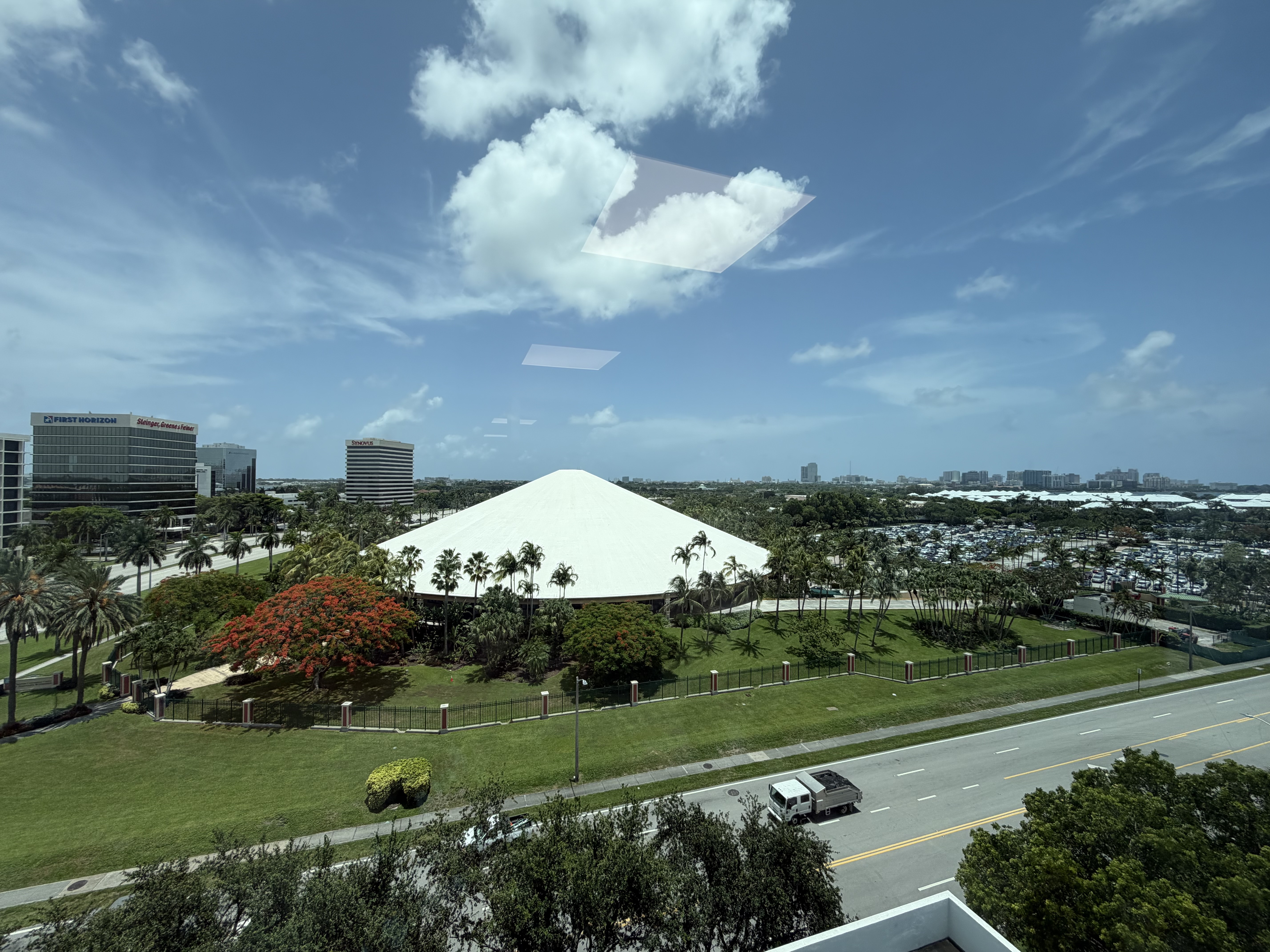
- West Palm Beach Christian Convention Center in June 2026
- Interactive map of West Palm Beach Christian Convention Center
- Former names: West Palm Beach Auditorium
- Location: 1610 Palm Beach Lakes Blvd., West Palm Beach, FL 33401
- Coordinates: 26°43′25″N 80°4′56″W
- Owner: Watchtower Bible and Tract Society, Inc.
- Capacity: 5,000

Construction
- Built: 1965

Tenants
- Fort Lauderdale Strikers (NASL) (1979–80); West Palm Beach Blaze/Barracudas (SuHL/SHL) (1992–96); Florida Hammerheads (RHI) (1993–94); Florida Beachdogs (CBA) (1995–97); Florida Bobcats (AFL) (1996–98)

West Palm Beach Christian Convention Center (originally known as the West Palm Beach Auditorium) is a 5,000-seat multi-purpose arena in West Palm Beach, Florida, at the intersection of North Congress Avenue and Palm Beach Lakes Boulevard. It was built in 1965 as the West Palm Beach Auditorium and was designed by famed architect Bertrand Goldberg. It was at one time home to the West Palm Beach Blaze ice hockey team, Florida Bobcats arena football team and Florida Hammerheads roller hockey team. It hosted the twelfth WWF In Your House pay-per-view in 1996. The Fort Lauderdale Strikers played their indoor soccer games here in the early 1980s. It was also host to innumerable concerts from different rock acts.

The facility was sold in the late 1990s to the Watchtower Bible and Tract Society, Inc., the main legal entity used by the Jehovah's Witnesses. The building and grounds were renovated and the name was changed to West Palm Beach Christian Convention Center and is now used only for their assemblies and conventions.

== Concerts ==
The Grateful Dead played one concert at the Auditorium, on September 11, 1982.
