= 2007 Austin Wranglers season =

Arena Football League team season

- General manager: Glyn Milburn
- Head coach: Brian Partlow
- Home stadium: Frank Erwin Center

Results
- Record: 4–12
- Division place: 5th
- Playoffs: did not qualify

The 2007 Austin Wranglers season was the 4th season for the franchise. The team finished eighth in the conference and did not make the playoffs.

== Schedule ==
Week	Date	Opponent	Home/Away Game	Result
1	March 4	Las Vegas Gladiators	Home	W 57–36
2	March 11	Georgia Force	Away	L 60–51
3	March 16	Orlando Predators	Away	L 45–30
4	March 24	Nashville Kats	Home	L 70–63
5	March 31	Dallas Desperados	Away	L 68–64
6	April 6	Utah Blaze	Home	W 65–64
7	April 14	Columbus Destroyers	Away	L 72–49
8	April 21	New Orleans VooDoo	Home	W 45–38
9			Bye Week	
10	May 6	Tampa Bay Storm	Home	L 46–45
11	May 12	Arizona Rattlers	Away	L 53–41
12	May 20	Orlando Predators	Home	L 46–45
13	May 27	Philadelphia Soul	Home	L 76–66
14	June 2	New York Dragons	Away	W 82–54
15	June 9	Georgia Force	Home	L 81–64
16	June 17	New Orleans VooDoo	Away	L 66–61
17	June 23	Tampa Bay Storm	Away	L 55–51

== Coaching ==
Brian Partlow, formerly the offensive coordinator for the Colorado Crush, started his first season as head coach of the Wranglers, replacing Skip Foster, who was fired during the 2006 season.

== Personnel moves ==
=== 2007 roster ===
Uniform #	Player	Position	Height	Weight (lb)
1	Adrian McPherson	QB	6'3"	218
2	Damon Mason	DS	5'9"	185
3	Mark Lewis	K	5'11"	200
7	Deveron Harper	DB	5'11"	200
9	Anthony Hines	WR	5'11"	185
12	Lang Campbell	QB	6'1"	210
17	Sakeen Wright	WR/DB	6'3"	225
18	Otis Amey	WR	5'10"	192
24	Nate Coggins	DS	6'1"	215
28	Kevin Nickerson	WR/DB	5'8"	185
32	Chad Dukes	FB/LB	6'1"	255
37	Greg Brown	LB	6'1"	205
40	Dane Krager	FB/LB/DL	6'3"	240
41	Akarika Dawn	FB	6'0"	240
49	Aaron Humphrey	OL	6"4"	265
56	Donny Klein	OL	6'1"	296
57	Eric Thomas	OL	6'3"	300
73	Donovan Arp	OL/DL	6'3"	285
75	Craig Heimburger	OL/DL	6'3"	325
87	Derrick Lewis	WR	6'2"	185
90	Davin Gaffney	DL	6'4"	340
91	Ramon Richardson	OL/DL	6'2"	295
95	Mike Williams	DL	6'3"	245
98	Rob Schroeder	OL/DL	6'4"	285

== Stats ==
=== Offense ===
==== Quarterback ====
Player	Comp.	Att.	Comp%	Yards	TD's	INT's	Long	Rating
Lang Campbell	184	278	66.2	2279	41	11	47	111.8

==== Running backs ====
Player	Car.	Yards	Avg.	TD's	Long
Sedrick Robinson	17	69	4.1	6	12
Otis Amey	26	51	2	10	7
Chad Dukes	19	42	2.2	3	19
Dane Krager	13	28	2.2	3	8
Lang Campbell	8	25	3.1	3	12
Donovan Arp	1	3	3	0	3

==== Wide receivers ====
Player	Rec.	Yards	Avg.	TD's	Long
Derrick Lewis	139	1903	13.7	41	49
Otis Amey	88	1035	11.8	18	45
Kevin Nickerson	90	1025	11.4	11	45
Sedrick Robinson	16	254	15.9	3	47
Sakeen Wright	11	109	9.9	2	24
Chad Dukes	7	80	11.4	1	28
Tango McCauley	6	34	5.7	3	15
Don Klein	3	19	6.3	1	13
Donovan Arp	2	12	6	0	9
Greg Brown	1	10	10	0	10
Ramon Richardson	2	10	5	1	7
Dane Krager	1	9	9	0	9

==== Touchdowns ====
Player	TD's	Rush	Rec	Ret	Pts
Derrick Lewis	41	0	41	0	246
Otis Amey	28	10	18	0	174
Sedrick Robinson	13	6	3	4	84
Kevin Nickerson	11	0	11	0	68
Chad Dukes	4	3	1	0	24
Lang Campbell	3	3	0	0	18
Tango McCauley	3	0	3	0	18
Sakeen Wright	2	0	2	0	18
Greg Brown	1	0	1	0	6
Don Klein	1	0	1	0	6
Dane Krager	1	1	0	0	6
Ramon Richardson	1	0	1	0	6

=== Defense ===
Player	Tackles	Solo	Assisted	Sack	Solo	Assisted	INT	Yards	TD's	Long
Damon Mason	93	80	26	0	0	0	4	38	0	29
Nate Coggins	64.5	55	19	0	0	0	1	19	0	19
Monty Montgomery	53	46	14	0	0	0	1	2	0	2
Erin Damond	47.5	39	17	0	0	0	2	27	0	21
Toure Carter	34.5	30	9	0	0	0	1	9	0	9
Sakeen Wright	33.5	26	15	0	0	0	1	36	0	36
Greg Brown	32.5	28	9	0	0	0	0	0	0	0
Dane Krager	28.5	21	15	3	2	2	1	4	0	4
Joseph Oniwor	27	17	20	2	2	0	0	0	0	0
Mike Williams	25	19	12	1.5	1	1	0	0	0	0
Rob Schroeder	18	16	4	4.5	4	1	0	0	0	0
Chad Dukes	17	13	8	0	0	0	0	0	0	0
Ramon Richardson	16	12	8	1	1	0	0	0	0	0
Sedrick Robinson	12	7	10	0	0	0	0	0	0	0
Kenny Smith	10	8	4	0	0	0	0	0	0	0
Otis Amey	9	7	4	0	0	0	0	0	0	0
Davin Gaffney	7.5	6	3	0	0	0	0	0	0	0
Damien Bauman	6.5	4	5	0	0	0	0	0	0	0
Derrick Lewis	6.5	6	1	0	0	0	0	0	0	0
Kevin Nickerson	6	5	2	0	0	0	0	0	0	0
Donovan Arp	5.5	4	3	1	1	0	0	0	0	0
Kabote Sikyala	4.5	4	1	0	0	0	0	0	0	0
Akarika Dawn	3.5	3	1	0	0	0	0	0	0	0
Lang Campbell	3	3	0	0	0	0	0	0	0	0
Aaron Gibson	3	3	0	0	0	0	0	0	0	0
Tango McCauley	3	3	0	0	0	0	0	0	0	0
Craig Heimburger	2	2	0	0	0	0	0	0	0	0
Mark Lewis	1.5	1	1	0	0	0	0	0	0	0
Terrance Ford	1	1	0	0	0	0	0	0	0	0
Eric Thomas	1	1	0	0	0	0	0	0	0	0

=== Special teams ===
==== Kick return ====
Player	Ret	Yards	TD's	Long	Avg	Ret	Yards	TD's	Long	Avg
Sedrick Robinson	64	1300	4	58	20.3	0	0	0	0	0
Otis Amey	33	611	0	43	18.5	2	41	0	37	20.5
Monty Montgomery	2	55	0	37	27.5	1	0	0	0	0
Derrick Lewis	4	21	0	11	5.3	0	0	0	0	0
Kevin Nickerson	1	13	0	13	13	0	0	0	0	0
Greg Brown	1	7	7	7	7	0	0	0	0	0

==== Kicking ====
Player	Extra pt.	Extra pt. Att.	FG	FGA	Long	Pct.	Pts
Kyle Robinson	110	118	15	25	33	0.600	155

== Regular season ==
=== Week 1: vs Las Vegas Gladiators ===
at Frank Erwin Center, Austin, Texas

Scoring summary:

1st Quarter:

2nd Quarter:

3rd Quarter:

4th Quarter:

=== Week 2: at Georgia Force ===
at Philips Arena, Atlanta

Scoring summary:

1st Quarter:

2nd Quarter:

3rd Quarter:

4th Quarter:

=== Week 3: at Orlando Predators ===
at Amway Arena, Orlando, Florida

Scoring summary:

1st Quarter:

2nd Quarter:

3rd Quarter:

4th Quarter:

=== Week 4: vs Nashville Kats ===
at Frank Erwin Center, Austin, Texas

Scoring summary:

1st Quarter:

2nd Quarter:

3rd Quarter:

4th Quarter:

=== Week 5: at Dallas Desperados ===
at American Airlines Center, Dallas, Texas

Scoring summary:

1st Quarter:

2nd Quarter:

3rd Quarter:

4th Quarter:

=== Week 6: vs Utah Blaze ===
at Frank Erwin Center, Austin, Texas

Scoring summary:

1st Quarter:

2nd Quarter:

3rd Quarter:

4th Quarter:

=== Week 7: at Columbus Destroyers ===
at Nationwide Arena, Columbus, Ohio

Scoring summary:

1st Quarter:

2nd Quarter:

3rd Quarter:

4th Quarter:

=== Week 8: vs New Orleans VooDoo ===
at Frank Erwin Center, Austin, Texas

Scoring summary:

1st Quarter:

2nd Quarter:

3rd Quarter:

4th Quarter:

=== Week 10: vs Tampa Bay Storm ===
at Frank Erwin Center, Austin, Texas

Scoring summary:

1st Quarter:

2nd Quarter:

3rd Quarter:

4th Quarter:

=== Week 11: at Arizona Rattlers ===
at US Airways Center, Phoenix, Arizona

Scoring summary:

1st Quarter:

2nd Quarter:

3rd Quarter:

4th Quarter:

=== Week 12: vs Orlando Predators ===
at Frank Erwin Center, Austin, Texas

Scoring summary:

1st Quarter:

2nd Quarter:

3rd Quarter:

4th Quarter:

=== Week 13: vs Philadelphia Soul ===
at Frank Erwin Center, Austin, Texas

Scoring summary:

1st Quarter:

2nd Quarter:

3rd Quarter:

4th Quarter:

=== Week 14: at New York Dragons ===
at the Nassau Coliseum, Uniondale, New York

Scoring summary:

1st Quarter:

2nd Quarter:

3rd Quarter:

4th Quarter:

=== Week 15: vs Georgia Force ===
at Frank Erwin Center, Austin, Texas

Scoring summary:

1st Quarter:

2nd Quarter:

3rd Quarter:

4th Quarter:

=== Week 16: at New Orleans VooDoo ===
at New Orleans Arena, New Orleans

Scoring summary:

1st Quarter:

2nd Quarter:

3rd Quarter:

4th Quarter:

=== Week 17: at Tampa Bay Storm ===
at the St. Pete Times Forum, Tampa, Florida

Scoring summary:

1st Quarter:

2nd Quarter:

3rd Quarter:

4th Quarter:
