= 2006 Austin Wranglers season =

Arena Football League team season

- General manager: Glyn Milburn
- Head coach: Skip Foster
- Home stadium: Frank Erwin Center

Results
- Record: 10–6
- Division place: 2nd
- Playoffs: L 52–35 to Philadelphia

The 2006 Austin Wranglers season was the 3rd season for the franchise. Looking to rebound from a 6–10 season in 2005, the Wranglers started the season with a 4–0 start. Finishing the season with a 10–6, reversal of last season, record the Wranglers were sent home in the first round by the Philadelphia Soul.

== Stats ==
=== Offence ===
==== Quarterback ====
Player	Comp.	Att.	Comp%	Yards	TDs	INTs	Long	Rating
John Fitzgerald	339	508	66.7%	3694	59	15	49	104.7

==== Running backs ====
Player	Car.	Yards	Avg.	TDs	Long
Dane Krager	59	197	3.3	12	24
Kevin Nickerson	29	73	2.5	6	9
Torrance Marshall	18	69	3.8	3	12
Henry Bryant	21	49	2.3	3	14
John Fitzgerald	21	42	2	9	10
Sedrick Robinson	9	26	2.9	4	8
Chance Mock	7	12	1.7	4	4
Donvetis Franklin	1	3	3	0	3
Darrin Chiaverini	1	2	2	1	2
Fred Coleman	7	0	0	2	3
Greg Brown	2	−2	−1	0	0

==== Wide receivers ====
Player	Rec.	Yards	Avg.	TDs	Long
Derrick Lewis	113	1411	12.5	23	49
Kevin Nickerson	98	1082	11	18	45
Sedrick Robinson	28	351	12.5	7	41
Darrin Chiaverini	39	317	8.1	2	20
Greg Brown	25	235	9.4	6	34
Dane Krager	10	84	8.4	0	16
Angel Rubio	4	40	10	0	23
Henry Bryant	3	35	11.7	0	24
P.J. Winston	3	25	8.3	0	16
Ramon Richardson	4	22	5.5	2	8
Donavan Arp	2	12	6	0	7
Aaron Humphrey	1	5	5	0	5
Bernard Holsey	1	3	3	0	3
