= List of mayors of Murray, Utah =

Murray, Utah was declared a city July 3, 1902, instituting a mayor-council form of government. The mayor of Murray was originally partisan, but switched to a non-partisan position. The term of mayor was originally two years, but amended to a four-year term in the 1940s in accordance with state law. The following is a list of mayors of Murray, Utah.

No.	Image	Name	Term began	Term ended
1		Chillion L. Miller	January 1, 1902	December 31, 1903
2		Joseph Stratton	January 1, 1904	December 31, 1905
3		Charles Brown	January 1, 1906	December 31, 1909
4		Phillip Bentz	January 1, 1910	December 31, 1911
5		George Huscher	January 1, 1912	December 31, 1915
6		James W. McHenry	January 1, 1916	December 31, 1917
7		Norman Erekson	January 1, 1918	December 31, 1919
8		Charles Anderson	January 1, 1920	December 31, 1923
9		Isaac Lester	January 1, 1924	December 31, 1929
10		Arthur Townsend	January 1, 1930	December 31, 1931
11		Fred Peters	January 1, 1932	December 31, 1933
12		Gottlieb Berger	January 1, 1934	December 31, 1941
13		Curtis Shaw	January 1, 1942	December 31, 1943
14		J. Clifford Hansen	January 1, 1944	December 31, 1945
15		William Ernest Smith	January 1, 1946	December 31, 1947
16		J. Clifford Hansen	January 1, 1948	December 31, 1957
17		Ray Greenwood	January 1, 1958	December 31, 1965
18		William E. Dunn	January 1, 1966	December 31, 1970
19		Vaughn Soffe	January 1, 1971	December 31, 1977
20		LaRell Muir	January 1, 1978	December 31, 1985
21		Lavar McMillan	January 1, 1986	December 31, 1989
22		Lynn Pett	January 1, 1990	December 31, 1998
23		Dan Snarr	January 1, 1999	December 31, 2013
24		Ted Eyre	January 1, 2014	September 19, 2017
25		Blair Camp	September 19, 2017	December 31, 2021
26		Brett Hales	January 1, 2022	
