= William E. Dunn =

American politician

William Dunn

18th Mayor of Murray, Utah
- In office 1 January 1965 – 1 January 1970
- Preceded by: Ray Greenwood
- Succeeded by: Vaughn Soffe

Personal details
- Born: March 7, 1926 Salt Lake City, Utah
- Died: August 13, 2016 (aged 90)
- Party: Republican
- Spouse: Norma Erickson
- Children: 4
- Education: University of Utah

William E. Dunn (March 7, 1926 - August 13, 2016) was elected mayor of Murray, Utah for two four-year terms during 1965-1970, and elected as a Salt Lake County Commissioner from 1970 to 1979. He also ran for the statewide office of Secretary of State for Utah but was defeated in 1972. He was known for his work to resolve Salt Lake County water issues, and to change the county government to a more urban format of county governance.

Prior to his government services he was owner of Murray City Pharmacy. He has been president of the Utah State Jaycees, by whom he was honored as outstanding young man of the state, and president of the Murray Chamber of Commerce. The Utah League of Cities and Towns named him Utah’s most outstanding city official in 1970.
