= William Ernest Smith =

American politician

15th Mayor of Murray, Utah
- In office 01 January 1946 – 01 January 1948
- Preceded by: J. Clifford Hansen
- Succeeded by: J. Clifford Hansen

Personal details
- Born: July 1, 1890 Sandy, Utah
- Died: April 4, 1973 (aged 82) Salt Lake City, Utah
- Spouse: Martha H. Fillmore (1913–1972; died)

William Ernest "Ernie" Smith served one term as mayor of Murray, Utah, from 1946-1947. He preferred to be known as Ernest or Ernie to differentiate himself and his father. Ernest was the son of local businessman William Smith, who owned the Murray Meat and Grocery store (later Smith Market) and who later oversaw the store.

He was president of the Murray School District board, a member of the Murray fire department since 1910, ex- president of the Utah State Firemen’s Association and past president of the Murray Lions Club.

He served as vice-president of the International Fire Chiefs Association, a notable achievement for a volunteer fire chief at the time. Murray City used volunteer firemen until the latter half of the twentieth century.

He died in a nursing home in 1973.
