= Vaughn Soffe =

American politician

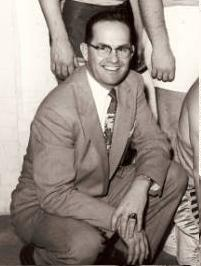

19th Mayor of Murray, Utah
- In office 1 January 1971 – 1 January 1977
- Preceded by: William E. Dunn
- Succeeded by: LaRell Muir

Personal details
- Born: May 8, 1913 South Jordan, Utah, U.S.
- Died: December 27, 2004 (aged 91) Murray, Utah
- Party: non-affiliated
- Spouse: Mary Jenkins
- Children: 4
- Education: Utah State University

Vaughn Carvel Soffe was mayor of Murray, Utah from 1971 to 1977. During his administration, Murray established Ken Price Field and Murray Parkway Golf Course, in addition to youth baseball and basketball programs. Murray also successfully defended itself from Salt Lake County challenging its re-development plans.

Soffe was the owner and president of Jenkins-Soffe Mortuary; a Funeral Director since 1938. He was past president of the Murray Kiwanis Club, the Murray Fraternal Order of Eagles, and Utah Funeral Directors Association. He was a member of the Cottonwood Hospital Board of Directors for many years. He was also Charter President of the Murray Jaycees, a past member of the Salt Lake County Volunteer Fire Department, member of the Board of Directors of Sentinel Security Life Insurance Co., Chairman of the Salt Lake County Fair Parade for five years, and president of the Utah League of Cities and Towns.

Soffe was the recipient of the Boy Scouts of America Silver Beaver Award and elected to the Utah Sports Hall of Fame.
