= Huscher =

Huscher is a surname of German origin. Notable people with the surname include:

- George Huscher (1865-1944), American politician
- Robert Huscher (1938–2024), American bobsledder

== See also ==
- Huscher, Kansas, an unincorporated community
