= Otis Amey =

American football player (born 1981)

Sacramento State Hornets
- Title: Director of player development
- CFL status: International

Personal information
- Born: December 4, 1981 (age 44); Union City, California, U.S.
- Listed height: 5 ft 10 in (1.78 m)
- Listed weight: 192 lb (87 kg)

Career information
- College: Sacramento State
- NFL draft: 2005: undrafted

Career history

Playing
- San Francisco 49ers (2005); Austin Wranglers (2007); Atlanta Falcons (2007)*; Cleveland Gladiators (2008); BC Lions (2009)*; Winnipeg Blue Bombers (2009); Sacramento Mountain Lions (2010); San Jose SaberCats (2011); Sacramento Mountain Lions (2011)
- * Offseason or practice squad member only

Operations
- Sacramento State (2026–present) Director of player development

Awards and highlights
- 2× All-American (2003, 2004); Second-team All-Arena (2008)

Career AFL statistics
- Receptions: 201
- Receiving yards: 2,549
- Receiving touchdowns: 66
- Kick returns: 68
- Return yards: 1,231
- Stats at ArenaFan.com
- Stats at Pro Football Reference

Fred Otis Holmes Amey (born December 4, 1981) is an American former professional football wide receiver who currently serves as the director of player development for the Sacramento State Hornets. He played in the National Football League (NFL) for the San Francisco 49ers. He played college football for Sacramento State before being signed by the 49ers as an undrafted free agent in 2005.

Amey also played for the Austin Wranglers, Atlanta Falcons, Cleveland Gladiators, BC Lions, Winnipeg Blue Bombers, San Jose SaberCats, and Sacramento Mountain Lions.

== Early life ==
Amey attended James Logan High School in Union City, California and lettered in football and track. As a senior, in football, he was an All-Mission Valley Athletic League selection and helped lead his team to the League championship.

== College career ==
Amey attended Sacramento State University, where he was a two-time All-American and the school's most productive receiver each of his four years. Between 2001 - 2004, Amey led the team in all-purpose yards, kick returns, receiving yards and punt returns. He finished his college career with 248 receptions, 4,049 receiving yards and 27 touchdowns.

Amey left Sacramento State holding all of the Hornets' major receiving and return records including: career receptions (248), career receiving TDs (27), season receptions (76), receptions in a single-game (15), career kickoff return yards (1,687), career punt return for touchdown (90 yards) and most punt returns in a season (33).

== Professional career ==
=== San Francisco 49ers ===
After going undrafted in the 2005 NFL draft, the San Francisco 49ers signed Amey on April 27, 2005. Prior to the season opener he changed his first name from Fred to Otis. He made the team out of training camp, and in his first regular season game against the St. Louis Rams on September 11, he returned a punt 75 yards for a touchdown. Amey played in 11 games over the course of the season, averaging 17.2 yards per kick return an 11.4 yards per punt return. He recorded no receptions and also fumbled once on a punt return. Amey was released by the 49ers on September 2, 2006.

=== Austin Wranglers ===
In early 2007, Amey signed with the Austin Wranglers of the Arena Football League. He went on to appear in all 16 regular season games for the Wranglers that season, totaling 1,738 all-purpose yards. Amey finished third on the team in receptions with 88 and was second on the team in both receiving yards (1,036) and touchdowns (18). Amey also carried the ball 25 times for 54 yards and returned 36 kicks for 630 yards.

=== Atlanta Falcons ===
On August 12, 2007, Amey signed with the Atlanta Falcons. He appeared in two preseason games, recording two receptions for 23 yards. However, Amey failed to make the team and was waived on September 1. He spent the rest of the year out of football.

=== Cleveland Gladiators ===
After not being able to land with an NFL team in 2007, Amey re-joined the AFL with the Cleveland Gladiators. On April 19, 2008, Amey recorded a career-high 15 receptions for 208 yards and six touchdowns in an 83–69 victory against the Los Angeles Avengers. He also helped lead the Gladiators to a deep playoff run, reaching the AFL National Conference Championship Game in 2008. Amey led the Arena Football League with 50 touchdowns in the 2008 season.

=== BC Lions ===
Amey was signed by the BC Lions on May 13, 2009. However, he was released at the end of training camp on June 24.

=== Winnipeg Blue Bombers ===
On August 17, 2009, the Blue Bombers signed Amey to the practice roster after learning their top receiver, Terrence Edwards, was questionable to play the next game with a turf toe injury. On September 26, Amey appeared in his first CFL game against the Toronto Argonauts. In the game, he recorded six receptions for 118 yards. Amey played in five regular season games for the Blue Bombers in 2009, recording 188 yards on 13 catches. He also recorded three tackles on special teams. On June 2, 2010, the Blue Bombers released Amey.

== Coaching career ==
On December 30, 2025, Amey was hired to serve as the director of player development for the Sacramento State Hornets under new head coach Alonzo Carter.

== Career statistics ==
Year	Team	Receiving			Rushing			Return		
Year	Team	Rec	Yards	TD	Att	Yards	TD	Ret	Yards	TD
2007	Aus.	89	1,033	18	25	54	10	36	630	0
2008	Cle.	112	1,516	48	5	11	1	32	601	1
Career		201	2,549	66	30	65	11	68	1,231	1

== Personal life ==
Amey's brother, Vince, was a defensive tackle at Arizona State and played for the Oakland Raiders in 1998. He also played for the Los Angeles Avengers and Arizona Rattlers of the Arena Football League between 2001 and 2007.
