= Lavar McMillan =

American politician

21st Mayor of Murray, Utah
- In office 1 January 1986 – 1 January 1990
- Preceded by: LaRell Muir
- Succeeded by: Lynn Pett

Personal details
- Born: September 11, 1921 Murray, Utah
- Died: February 28, 1997 (aged 75)
- Spouse: Ruby Richards
- Children: 5
- Education: Utah State University

Lavar Cook "Mac" McMillan was mayor of Murray, Utah from 1986 to 1990. During his administration, Murray saw the development of several notable business complexes namely the “Sports Mall.” He made national headlines when he was quoted by a reporter, that in the National Basketball Association, “it's getting so the white players don't have a chance…I believe we have to do something.” He was subsequently defeated in his re-election bid by his assistant Lynn Pett.

== Biography ==
Lavar McMillan born September 11, 1921, in Murray, Utah and graduated from Murray High School. He was drafted into the United States Army during World War II and participated in the D-Day invasion of Normandy on Utah Beach and the liberation of the Dachau concentration camp. He graduated from Utah State University with bachelor's degrees in Dairy Manufacturing and Microbiology. Mac then became a partner in Ekins Dairy in Marriott-Slaterville, Utah and later rose to the position of Plant Manager for Hi-Land Dairy. Mac worked in the dairy industry for more than 40 years.

Lavar was an active member of the Murray Rotary Club, and received the Outstanding Alumnus Award for Murray High School.

== Death ==
Lavar McMillan died on 28 February 1997, after a 15-year battle with cancer.
