= Krager =

Krager may refer to:

- Dane Krager (born 1979), American footballer
- Krager (comics), a DC Comics character
