= Lynn Pett =

American politician

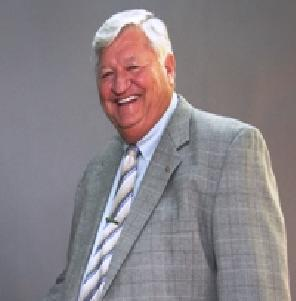

22nd Mayor of Murray, Utah
- In office 1 January 1990 – 1 January 1998
- Preceded by: Lavar McMillan
- Succeeded by: Dan Snarr

Personal details
- Born: December 20, 1940 Payson, Utah
- Died: September 17, 2017 (aged 76) Taylorsville, Utah
- Party: Democrat
- Spouse: Kathleen Pett
- Children: 2
- Education: University of Utah

Lynn F. Pett (December 20, 1940-September 17, 2017) was mayor of Murray, Utah from 1990-1998. Prior to serving as Mayor, Pett worked in government service for six years as executive assistant to the mayor of Murray. Pett began his career in 1958 and has worked under five Murray mayors and two commissioners. He has also served on the Murray Community Education Program, the University of Utah Recreation and Parks Advisory Board, the Murray Boys and Girls Club Advisory Board and the Murray United Way Board. Pett was born in Eureka, Utah and graduated from the University of Utah with a degree in Biology.

Mayor Pett began his career with Murray City government starting at age 16, by working in the Parks and Recreation Department. He spent 25 years working as a department head in the parks administration where he oversaw the creation of the Murray swimming pool; establishing several neighborhood parks; developing additions to larger parks such as Jordan River Parkway, Murray City Park and Grant Park; and working on the development of Ken Price Ball Park. In addition, Pett served as Murray's emergency management director in 1983-87 and was responsible for all flood-related programs.

Pett has received numerous awards, including the Murray Chamber of Commerce Community Service Award and recognition from the Boys & Girls Clubs of America in 1988 as "Murray's Leading Citizen." Murray City honored Pett by naming its golf course, Lynn F. Pett Parkway Golf Course.
