= Craig Heimburger =

American football player (born 1977)

No. 75, 67
- Position: Guard

Personal information
- Born: February 3, 1977 (age 49); Belleville, Illinois, U.S.
- Listed height: 6 ft 2 in (1.88 m)
- Listed weight: 314 lb (142 kg)

Career information
- High school: Belleville East
- College: Missouri
- NFL draft: 1999: 5th round, 163rd overall pick

Career history
- Green Bay Packers (1999–2000); Cincinnati Bengals (2000); Buffalo Bills (2001); Houston Texans (2002)*; Colorado Crush (2006); Austin Wranglers (2007); Cleveland Gladiators (2008)
- * Offseason or practice squad member only

Awards and highlights
- First-team All-Big 12 (1998)
- Stats at Pro Football Reference

Craig Andre Heimburger (born February 3, 1977) is an American former professional football player.

== Early life ==
He attended Belleville East High School. He played college football at the University of Missouri, where he earned All-Big 12 Conference honors in 1998.

== Professional career ==
Heimburger was a fifth round pick of the Green Bay Packers of the National Football League (NFL) in the 1999 NFL draft.

In 2000, he was allocated by the Packers to the NFL Europe to play for the Rhein Fire. The Fire won the championship and Heimburger earned all NFLE honors. He also played for the Cincinnati Bengals in 2000, and the Buffalo Bills in 2001. In 2002, he was in training camp with the Houston Texans for their inaugural season.

After leaving the NFL, Heimburger joined the Arena Football League. He played for the Colorado Crush (2006), Austin Wranglers (2007), and Cleveland Gladiators (2008).

== Personal life ==
In 2003, he co-founded Heimburger Construction Company LLC, licensed in the state of Illinois.
