= Charles Anderson (mayor) =

Mayor of Murray, Utah (1875–1949)

8th Mayor of Murray, Utah
- In office January 1, 1920 – January 1, 1923
- Preceded by: Norman Erekson
- Succeeded by: Isaac Lester

Personal details
- Born: November 18, 1875 Fredrikstad, Sor-Trondelag, Norway
- Died: October 11, 1949 (aged 73) Murray, Utah
- Spouse: Ida Brown
- Children: 4

Charles Anderson (November 18, 1875 – October 11, 1949) was mayor of Murray, Utah from 1920 to 1923.

He was born in Fredrikstad, Norway to Julius and Elizabeth Erickson Anderson. He came to Murray in 1889 at the age of 14. Charles Anderson pursued a public school education supplemented by courses in the International Correspondence Schools in electric lighting and power. From the age of eighteen he was employed at the American Smelting & Refining Company (ASARCO) smelter in Murray.

Anderson was a past grand master of the Murray Lodge of the Independent Order of Odd Fellows and was also deputy grand master for his district. He belonged to the Fraternal Order of Eagles and was an officer of the fire department.

He was a socialist with labor views. During his term, he was noted for opposing the Utah State Senate's bill to reclassify cities. He ran for re-election in 1927 but was defeated.
