= Donovan Arp =

American football player (born 1978)

Profile
- Position: Defensive lineman

Personal information
- Born: January 12, 1978 (age 48); Murray, Utah, U.S.
- Listed height: 6 ft 3 in (1.91 m)
- Listed weight: 285 lb (129 kg)

Career information
- High school: Murray
- College: Louisville
- NFL draft: 2001: undrafted

Career history
- Washington Redskins (2001); Tennessee Titans (2001)*; Carolina Panthers (2002)*; Buffalo Destroyers (2003); Columbus Destroyers (2004); Philadelphia Soul (2004–2005); Austin Wranglers (2006–2007); Grand Rapids Rampage (2008); Cleveland Gladiators (2010)
- * Offseason or practice squad member only
- Stats at ArenaFan.com

Donovan Arp (born January 12, 1978) is an American former professional football offensive lineman/defensive lineman who played in the Arena Football League. He played college football for the University of Louisville.

== Early life ==
Growing up in a Samoan American family, Arp attended Murray High School in Murray, Utah, and was a letterman in football, rugby union, and track & field. In football, he won All-Region honors as a senior.
