= Nate Coggins =

American football player (born 1978)

Profile
- Position: Defensive back

Personal information
- Born: September 25, 1975

Career information
- College: West Georgia

Career history
- 2005–2006: Georgia Force
- 2007: Austin Wranglers
- 2008: Columbus Destroyers

Nate Coggins (born September 25, 1978) is a former Arena Football League defensive specialist. He played for the Georgia Force (2005–2006), the Austin Wranglers (2007) and the Columbus Destroyers (2008 season).

== High school years ==
Coggins attended North Atlanta High School in Atlanta, Georgia and was a letterman in football, wrestling, and baseball. In football, he was named the Team's Most Valuable Player, received the Golden Helmet Award, and won All-City honors and All-Metro honors. In wrestling, he won All-City and All-Metro honors. He graduated from North Atlanta High School in 1997.

== College years ==
Coggins attended the University of West Georgia and was a letterman in football. In football, he was a three-time All-Gulf South Conference selection, a two-time All-American, and was named the Gulf South Conference's Defensive Player of the Year as a junior.
