= Arthur Townsend =

American politician (1868–1950)

10th Mayor of Murray, Utah
- In office January 1, 1930 – January 1, 1932
- Preceded by: Isaac Lester
- Succeeded by: Fred Peters

Personal details
- Born: September 13, 1868 Derbyshire, England
- Died: August 28, 1950 (aged 81) Murray, Utah
- Spouse: Lovenia Harker
- Children: 3

Arthur Townsend was the mayor of Murray, Utah from 1930 to 1932. A native of Derbyshire England, he was born to William and Ruth Townsend. He came to America when he was 13 years old and later he fulfilled a two-year Mormon mission to England. He was a member of the Murray city chamber of commerce and owned the Murray Mercantile Company which he operated for more than 40 years. Prior to establishing the mercantile company he worked on a farm and later as a wallpaper hanger. During his tenure as Mayor, he was noted for making improvements to Murray's hydroelectric power station located in Little Cottonwood Canyon.
