= Ray Greenwood =

American politician (1898–1986)

17th Mayor of Murray, Utah
- In office 1 January 1957 – 1 January 1965
- Preceded by: J. Clifford Hansen
- Succeeded by: William E. Dunn

Personal details
- Born: January 28, 1898 Sandy, Utah
- Died: March 31, 1986 (aged 88) Murray, Utah
- Party: Democrat
- Spouse: Arvilla Hansen
- Children: 5

Ray P. Greenwood (January 28, 1898 – March 31, 1986) was a Utah State Legislator, Salt Lake County commissioner and Mayor of Murray, Utah. He was a lifelong resident of Salt Lake County and born near Sandy, Utah where he graduated from Jordan High School. He served in the field artillery overseas during World War I, and returned to be a farmer and cattle rancher.

He accepted an appointment as Supervisor of Roads in Salt Lake County as his first public office holding the post for seven years. Later he became superintendent of the county road department and later Superintendent of the county hospital. He was elected to the state legislature three consecutive times in 1943, 1945, and 1947 but declined to serve the third term as he filed for county commissioner and was elected to that position in the following year. He was re-elected commissioner in 1950 and served a total of six years in the position, twice as chairman of the board. He was defeated in seeking a third term. During his county service he oversaw the creation of a countywide sewer project and launched the Salt Lake County Water Conservancy District. Greenwood was elected vice president and later president of the Utah State Association of County Officials. He defeated incumbent Mayor J. Clifford Hansen in 1957, serving two terms as Mayor of Murray.

He was known for his activities as drillmaster and as a charter member of the Ute Rangers Riding Club and marched in the Rose Parade. He was a member of the Lions Club, Utah Footprinters, Veterans of Foreign Wars and American Legion. He served on the Salt Lake County Fair Board for 20 years and president for four years. He served as vice president of the Days of '47 Rodeo Committee.
