= Chillion L. Miller =

American politician

Chillion Letts Miller

1st Mayor of Murray, Utah
- In office January 1, 1902 – December 31, 1903
- Preceded by: New Office
- Succeeded by: Joseph Stratton

Personal details
- Born: November 29, 1848 Council Bluffs, Iowa
- Died: March 9, 1925 (aged 76) Murray, Utah
- Spouse: Harriet Taft
- Children: 2

Chillion Letts "C.L." Miller was the first elected mayor of Murray, Utah from 1902 to 1903. Serving along with him were as City Recorder M.A. Williamsun and Councilmen James Gilbert, Reynolds Cahoon, Arthur E. White, Herbert S. Sanders and William Mccleary. Mayor Miller's term may well be called a period of organization. There were many offices and committees to be created to comply with law and to properly supervise the business interests of the city.

There were committees organized for municipal law, streets, licenses and franchises, public grounds, sanitary regulations, and public ordinances. On September 1, 1903, a committee was appointed with H. S. Sanders as chairman and Reynolds Cahoon and James Gilbert as members to investigate the matter of establishing a precinct in Murray city. A large number of ordinances were drawn up, sixteen of which were passed and adopted among these were ordinances on general provisions, one setting forth the duties of city officers, one on misdemeanors, one setting salaries, a franchise to the Rocky Mountain Bell Telephone company, two on dog licenses and dog taxes, one on curfew, one pertaining to railroads and other ordinances relating to nuisances, private boarding houses, bicycle riding, and one establishing the boundary line of State Street.
