= Norman Erekson =

American politician

7th Mayor of Murray, Utah
- In office January 1, 1918 – January 1, 1919
- Preceded by: James W. McHenry
- Succeeded by: Charles Anderson

Personal details
- Born: March 9, 1867 Murray, Utah, U.S.
- Died: April 6, 1945 (aged 78) Murray, Utah, U.S.
- Party: Republican
- Spouse: Ellen Underwood
- Children: 3
- Education: University of Utah

Norman W. Erekson (March 9, 1867 - April 6, 1945) was mayor of Murray, Utah from 1918 to 1919.

Norman Wines Erekson was born in South Cottonwood, Utah to Jonas Erekson (1827-1881) and Mary Powell Erekson (1830- 1891). His father had immigrated as a child from Stavanger, Norway. Norman Erekson, the youngest of the family, attended St. Mark's School in Salt Lake City while subsequently he became a student at the University of Utah. From school he was identified with ranching in West Tintic (Eureka, Utah), raising cattle and horses. Erekson served for two terms as trustee in the twenty sixth district and later was made a member of the Granite School District board. Afterward he spent his time on his ranch at West Tintic where he engaged in raising cattle and horses until 1916 when he sold out to J.E. Johnson and moved his family to Murray.

His political allegiance was to the Republican Party. His administration was noted for dealing with the 1918 flu pandemic, which required the city to enforce strict health measures and lease buildings to handle those infected with the Spanish Influenza. He died of a pulmonary embolism in 1945 at age 78.
