= James W. McHenry =

American politician (1864–1931)

James McHenry

6th Mayor of Murray, Utah
- In office 01 January 1916 – 01 January 1917
- Preceded by: George Huscher
- Succeeded by: Norman Erekson

Personal details
- Born: October 23, 1864 Nashville, Tennessee
- Died: November 23, 1931 (aged 67) Murray, Utah
- Spouse(s): Susan Catherine Barrett, Livydell P. Felker
- Children: 8

James Wilson McHenry was mayor of Murray, Utah from 1916 to 1917. McHenry was born in Nashville, Tennessee and moved to Murray in 1881. He worked for the LDS Church supervising its tithing yard in Salt Lake City. He helped organize the Murray Commercial Club and later formed the Salt Lake Commercial Club. He later oversaw the foundation of a West Jordan sugar beet factory.

McHenry’s tenure in office was noted for the expansion of the cities’ sewer and irrigation lines. McHenry, previous to being elected, pushed for municipally owned power generation.
