= Tango McCauley =

American gridiron football player (born 1978)

No. 65
- Position: Offensive lineman

Personal information
- Born: October 27, 1978 (age 48); Oklahoma City, Oklahoma, U.S.
- Listed height: 6 ft 4 in (1.93 m)
- Listed weight: 305 lb (138 kg)

Career information
- High school: Oklahoma City (OK) John Marshall
- College: Alabama State
- NFL draft: 2002: undrafted

Career history
- Saskatchewan Roughriders (2003); British Columbia Lions (2004); Dallas Cowboys (2004)*; Carolina Panthers (2004)*; Saskatchewan Roughriders (2005); Chicago Rush (2006); Montreal Alouettes (2006); New Orleans VooDoo (2007); Austin Wranglers (2007); Cleveland Gladiators (2008)
- * Offseason or practice squad member only

Awards and highlights
- ArenaBowl champion (2006); Division I-AA All-America (2001); All-Big 12 (2000)

Career AFL statistics
- Receptions: 6
- Receiving yards: 34
- Receiving touchdowns: 3
- Total tackles: 5
- Stats at ArenaFan.com

Tango Lee McCauley Sr. (born October 27, 1978) is an American former professional football offensive lineman. He played college football at Texas A&M University and Alabama State University

In his career, McCauley was a member of the Saskatchewan Roughriders, British Columbia Lions, Dallas Cowboys, Carolina Panthers, Chicago Rush, Montreal Alouettes, New Orleans VooDoo, Austin Wranglers, and Cleveland Gladiators.

== Early life ==
McCauley attended John Marshall High School in Oklahoma City. He was a three sport letterman in football, basketball and track & field. In football, he was a first team All-State selection. He participated in the Oil Bowl, Blue/Grey and the Oklahoma All-State game. He graduated in 1997.

== College career ==
McCauley spent three seasons playing at Texas A&M (1998–2000) before transferring to Alabama State University in 2001. He was a two-year starter at left tackle for Texas A&M, earning preseason All-Big 12 honors before the 2000 season. He earned Division I-AA All-America honors at Alabama State as an Offensive tackle in 2001.

== Professional career ==
=== Pre-draft ===
McCauley was invited, and attended the 2002 NFL Combine. He was rated the 18th best guard out of 43, and was projected to go unselected in the draft.

Pre-draft measurables
Height	Weight	40-yard dash	10-yard split	20-yard split	20-yard shuttle	Three-cone drill	Vertical jump	Broad jump	Bench press
6 ft 3 3/8 in (1.91 m)	304 lb (138 kg)	5.00 s	1.63 s	2.99 s	4.48 s	7.11 s	35 in (0.89 m)	8 ft 11 in (2.72 m)	31 reps
All values from NFL Combine.

=== Canadian Football League (2003–2005, 2007) ===
McCauley was not selected in the 2002 NFL draft and took a year away from football in 2002. He then signed with the Saskatchewan Roughriders of the Canadian Football League. Then, in 2004 played for the British Columbia Lions. That same year, he attended training camp with the Dallas Cowboys, as well as the Carolina Panthers, he was not on the final roster. He returned to the Roughriders in 2005.

=== Arena Football League (2006–2008) ===
In 2006, McCauley signed with the Chicago Rush of the Arena Football League. He played in 14 games as a rookie, primarily on the offensive line at Guard and Center. He did however play some on defense, where he recorded 2.5 tackles and one pass broken up.

McCauley then returned to the CFL after the 2006 AFL season, signing in July 2006 with the Montreal Alouettes. Then in 2007, he signed with the New Orleans VooDoo where he played in seven games mostly on the offensive line, however, he also recorded six receptions for 34 yards and three touchdowns, as well as two tackles. He was then waived by the VooDoo and signed by the Austin Wranglers of the af2, where he played in eight games. After the season, he signed with the Cleveland Gladiators. After the 2008 season, he declared retirement from professional football.

== Personal ==
McCauley lives in Oklahoma City during the off-season. He enjoys outdoor sports, especially hunting and fishing.
