= Douglas Byrd High School =

American public school in North Carolina

Location
- 1624 Ireland Dr; Fayetteville, North Carolina 28304; United States; 35°01′52″N 78°56′54″W

Information
- Type: Public
- Established: 1972 (54 years ago)
- CEEB code: 341315
- Teaching staff: 65.25 (FTE)
- Grades: 9–12
- Enrollment: 1,002 (2023–2024)
- Student to teacher ratio: 15.36
- Colors: Maroon, white, gold
- Team name: Eagles
- Feeder schools: Douglas Byrd Middle, Ireland Drive Middle
- Website: dbhs.ccs.k12.nc.us

Douglas Byrd High School is a four-year public high school located in Fayetteville, North Carolina. Their mascot is the Eagle.

== History ==
Douglas Byrd High School opened its doors to students in 1972. The school is named after the late F. D. Byrd, who served as the superintendent of the Cumberland County Schools.

== Notable alumni ==
- Dominic A. Antonelli — former NASA astronaut
- Brad Edwards — NFL defensive back and Super Bowl XXVI champion with the Washington Redskins
- Donvetis Franklin — Arena Football League player
- Joe Horn — NFL wide receiver and 4x Pro Bowl selection
- Calvin Lowry — NFL safety
- Clint Lowery — musician, songwriter and producer, best known as a guitarist and backing vocalist in the rock band Sevendust
- Corey Lowery — musician, songwriter, record producer and engineer
- Troy McLawhorn — musician and guitarist
- Ricky Shaw — NFL linebacker
- Kinnon Tatum — NFL linebacker
- Donnell Woolford — NFL cornerback, Pro Bowl selection in 1994, named to Chicago Bears 100 greatest players of all-time list
