= Charles Brown (mayor) =

American politician (1873–1943)

3rd Mayor of Murray, Utah
- In office January 1, 1906 – January 1, 1909
- Preceded by: Joseph Stratton
- Succeeded by: Phillip Bentz

Personal details
- Born: September 28, 1873 Murray, Utah Territory, U.S.
- Died: February 8, 1943 (aged 69) Murray, Utah, U.S.
- Party: non-affiliated
- Spouse: Hilma W. Johnson
- Children: 8
- Education: Brigham Young University

Charles Brown (September 28, 1873 – February 8, 1943) was mayor of Murray, Utah from 1906 to 1909. He was the first mayor of Murray to serve two terms. From 1898 to 1933 he engaged in the grocery business in Murray. He was active in the LDS Church serving a church mission to California from 1896 to 1898. He was a graduate of Murray city public schools and Brigham Young University. During his tenure in office Murray started construction on sidewalks, street lighting, roads, and a city hall.
