= Kennecott Nature Center =

Coordinates: 40°39′46″N 111°54′45″W

The Kennecott Nature Center is a nature observation center and classroom located in an area of wetlands alongside the Jordan River in Murray, Utah. The center is operated by the Murray City School District.

Through an initial donation from Kennecott Utah Copper Corporation, the efforts of the Murray Education Foundation, and community donors, the Kennecott Nature Center provides opportunities for children from Murray City School District and selected Granite School District fourth-grade classes to observe and learn about nature up close and hands on. The building was designed in a null of earth making it not visible from street level. Atop the building's roof is a garden of native Utah plants. Below, near the water's edge is a nature trail with native trees, where students can get up close to wildlife and the river.

The 1,600-square-foot (150 m^{2}) classroom of the Kennecott Nature Center is situated on the second largest wetland site of the Jordan River at 5044 S. Lucky Clover Lane (approx. 5100 South and 800 West) in Murray.

The Jordan River Parkway runs alongside the nature center.
