= Curtis Shaw =

American politician

13th Mayor of Murray, Utah
- In office January 1, 1942 – January 1, 1944
- Preceded by: Gottlieb Berger
- Succeeded by: J. Clifford Hansen

Personal details
- Born: March 1, 1888 Union, Utah
- Died: February 19, 1944 (aged 55) Los Angeles County, California
- Spouse: Vinnie Stephensen
- Children: 5

Curtis L. Shaw (March 1, 1888 – February 19, 1944) was mayor of Murray, Utah from 1942 to 1943. He was born in Union, Utah March 1, 1888. He was educated in the Fort Union area and was a farmer up to the time he moved to Murray in 1921. He was a general construction contractor since 1908 where he built homes as well as two power plants in Murray and one in Bountiful Canyon. He was a member of the Murray Lions Club for 14 years and was the chapter's vice president.

His tenure for mayor was noted for his opposition to transforming the city into a city manager form of government. His campaign called referred to such a government as creating a "dictator." He was defeated for re-election and died the year he left office.
