= Braxton Jones =

American football player (born 1999)

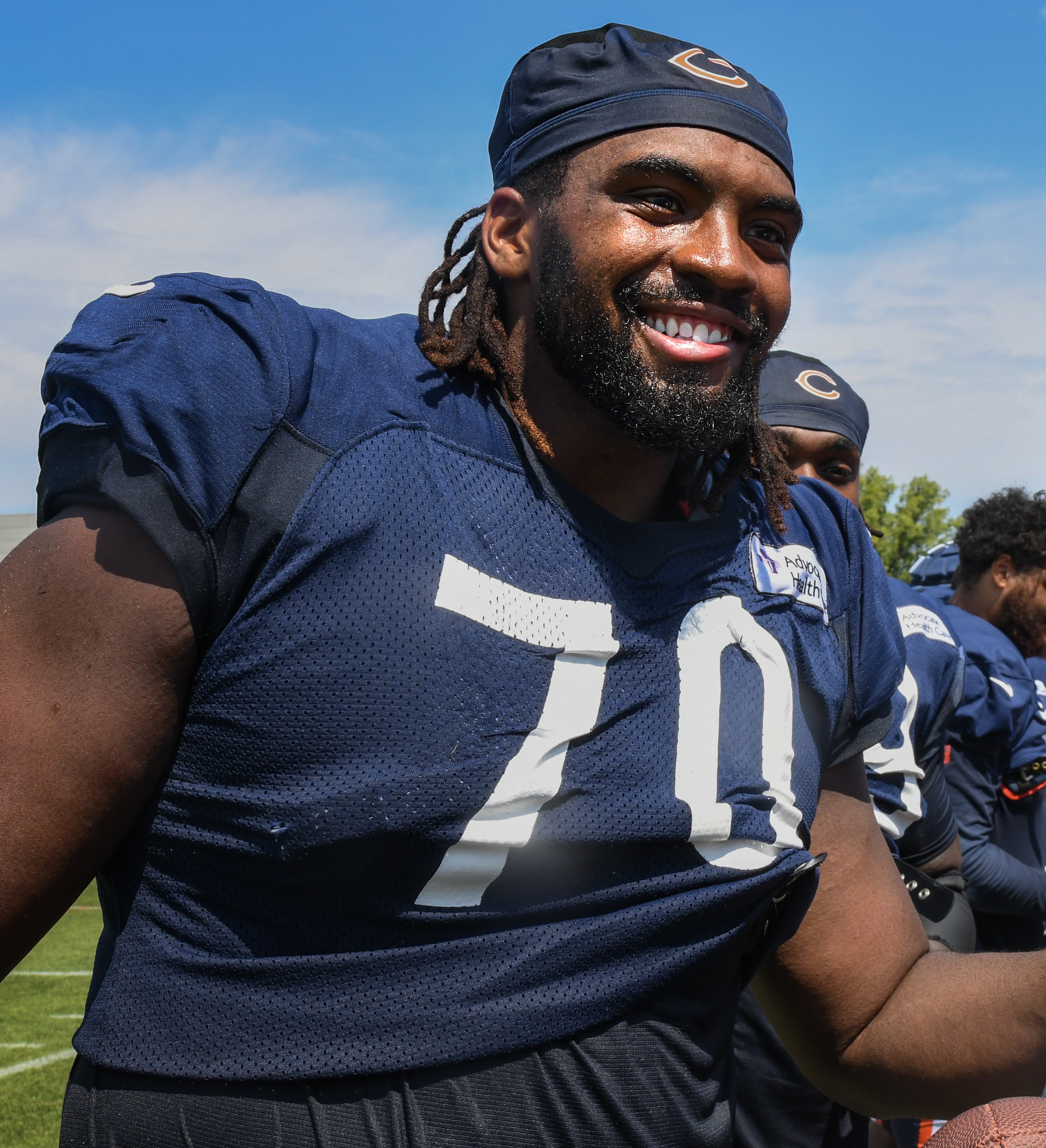
- Jones with the Chicago Bears in 2024

No. 70 – Chicago Bears
- Position: Offensive tackle
- Roster status: Injured reserve

Personal information
- Born: March 27, 1999 (age 27); Murray, Utah, U.S.
- Listed height: 6 ft 5 in (1.96 m)
- Listed weight: 303 lb (137 kg)

Career information
- High school: Murray
- College: Southern Utah (2017–2021)
- NFL draft: 2022: 5th round, 168th overall pick

Career history
- Chicago Bears (2022–present)

Awards and highlights
- PFWA All-Rookie Team (2022); 2× First-team All-Big Sky (2020, 2021); Third-team All-Big Sky (2019)

Career NFL statistics as of 2025
- Games played: 46
- Games started: 44
- Stats at Pro Football Reference

Braxton Jones (born March 27, 1999) is an American professional football offensive tackle for the Chicago Bears of the National Football League (NFL). He played college football for the Southern Utah Thunderbirds.

== Early life ==
Jones grew up in Murray, Utah and attended Murray High School, where he played basketball and football.

== College career ==
Jones played in two games as a true freshman before suffering a thumb injury against Stephen F. Austin and redshirting the remainder of the season. Jones became a starter as a redshirt sophomore and was named third-team All-Big Sky Conference. He started four games at left tackle during his redshirt junior season, which was shortened and played in the spring of 2021 due to the COVID-19 pandemic in the United States, and was named first-team all-conference. Jones repeated as a first-team All-Big Sky selection in 2021. During the season, Jones received an invitation to play in the Senior Bowl.

== Professional career ==
Pre-draft measurables
Height	Weight	Arm length	Hand span	Wingspan	40-yard dash	10-yard split	20-yard split	20-yard shuttle	Three-cone drill	Vertical jump	Broad jump	Bench press
6 ft 5 1/4 in (1.96 m)	310 lb (141 kg)	35 3/8 in (0.90 m)	10 1/4 in (0.26 m)	6 ft 11 1/2 in (2.12 m)	4.97 s	1.74 s	2.86 s	4.74 s	7.59 s	27.0 in (0.69 m)	9 ft 0 in (2.74 m)	26 reps
All values from NFL Combine/Pro Day

Jones was selected by the Chicago Bears with the 168th pick in the fifth round of the 2022 NFL draft. Jones started in all 17 games for the Bears. He was named to the PFWA All-Rookie Team. Pro Football Focus (PFF) named Jones to their 2022 All-Rookie Team following the regular season.

Jones returned as the Bears starting left tackle in 2023. He suffered a hamstring injury in Week 2 and was placed on injured reserve on September 20, 2023. He was activated on November 4.

On October 25, 2025, Jones was placed on injured reserve due to a knee injury. He was activated on January 13, 2026, ahead of the team's divisional round matchup against the Los Angeles Rams.

On March 13, 2026, Jones re-signed with the Bears on a one-year, $10 million contract. He started the first three games before suffering a partial patellar tendon tear that ended his season.
