= Donvetis Franklin =

American football player (born 1978)

No. 9
- Position: Defensive specialist

Personal information
- Born: January 15, 1978 (age 48)
- Listed height: 5 ft 11 in (1.80 m)
- Listed weight: 210 lb (95 kg)

Career information
- High school: Douglas Byrd (Fayetteville, North Carolina)
- College: Michigan State

Career history
- Carolina Rhinos (2001); New York Dragons (2002–2004); Columbus Destroyers (2005); Austin Wranglers (2006); Dallas Desperados (2008)
- Stats at ArenaFan.com

Donvetis Franklin (born January 15, 1978) is an American former professional football defensive specialist who played in the Arena Football League for the New York Dragons, Columbus Destroyers, Austin Wranglers, and Dallas Desperados.

== Early life ==
While attending Douglas Byrd High School in Fayetteville, North Carolina, Franklin lettered in football.

== College career ==
Franklin attended Hutchinson Community College in Hutchinson, Kansas for two years. As a sophomore, he was named a JUCO Honorable Mention All-American and finished his sophomore season with two interceptions and 68 tackles.

Franklin attended Michigan State University, where, as a senior, he helped lead his team to the Citrus Bowl and become one of the top ten teams in the nation.

== Professional career ==
Franklin played for the Carolina Rhinos of the af2 in 2001.
