= Kinnon Tatum =

American football player (born 1975)

No. 50
- Position: Linebacker

Personal information
- Born: July 19, 1975 (age 51); Fayetteville, North Carolina, U.S.
- Listed height: 6 ft 0 in (1.83 m)
- Listed weight: 222 lb (101 kg)

Career information
- High school: Douglas Byrd (Fayetteville)
- College: Notre Dame (1993–1996)
- NFL draft: 1997: 3rd round, 87th overall pick

Career history
- Carolina Panthers (1997–1998); Tampa Bay Buccaneers (2000)*
- * Offseason or practice squad member only

Career NFL statistics
- Tackles: 26
- Forced fumbles: 1
- Fumble recoveries: 1
- Stats at Pro Football Reference

Kinnon Ray Tatum II (born July 19, 1975) is an American former professional football player who was a linebacker for two seasons with the Carolina Panthers of the National Football League (NFL). He was selected by the Panthers in the third round of the 1997 NFL draft after playing college football at the University of Notre Dame.

== Early life and college ==
Kinnon Ray Tatum II was born on July 19, 1975, in Fayetteville, North Carolina. He attended Douglas Byrd High School in Fayetteville.

Tatum played college football for the Notre Dame Fighting Irish of the University of Notre Dame from 1993 to 1996. He recorded one interception in 1995 and one interception in 1996.

== Professional career ==
Tatum was selected by the Carolina Panthers in the third round, with the 87th overall pick, of the 1997 NFL draft. He officially signed with the team on June 9. He played in all 16 games for the Panthers during the 1997 season and posted three solo tackles. Tatum appeared in 15 games in 1998, recording 19 solo tackles, four assisted tackles, one forced fumble, and one fumble recovery. He was released on September 5, 1999.

Tatum signed with the Tampa Bay Buccaneers on January 25, 2000. He was released on August 22, 2000.

== Post-playing career ==
Tatum worked for Allstate after his football career. He also spent time as the linebackers coach at Providence High School in Charlotte, North Carolina. He was also an assistant coach for the Notre Dame Fighting Irish and the Seton Hill Griffins.
