= J. Clifford Hansen =

American politician

14th & 16th Mayor of Murray, Utah
- In office 01 January 1944 (1st term), 1948 (2nd Term) – 01 January 1945 (1st term), 1957 (2nd Term)
- Preceded by: Curtis Shaw (1st Term), William Ernest Smith(2nd Term)
- Succeeded by: William Ernest Smith (1st Term), Ray Greenwood(2nd Term)

Personal details
- Born: James Clifford Hansen; December 29, 1893 Murray, Utah
- Died: July 18, 1967 (aged 73) Salt Lake City, Utah
- Children: 2

James Clifford Hansen (December 29, 1893 – July 18, 1967) was mayor of Murray, Utah for two stints in office. He served as mayor during 1944-1945 and again from 1948-1957. Previous to being elected mayor, Hansen served a total of 12 years as a Murray city commissioner. During his time in office, he was known for greatly expanding electric power generation for the municipally owned utility and improving infrastructure for the city's water department.

A veteran of overseas service during World War I, Hansen was a member of the American Legion, and the Veterans of Foreign Wars. He was a director of the Cahoon Maxfield Irrigation Co and served on the Salt Lake County fair board having been one of the originators of the fair.

In 1943, he defeated incumbent mayor, Curtis Shaw, but was in turn defeated in his re-election bid in 1945 by William Ernest Smith. He ran for Salt Lake County commissioner, but was defeated in 1946. He would succeed in ousting Smith, and be re-elected mayor for two more terms. He is the only mayor of Murray to have two non-consecutive terms. He was the first Murray mayor to serve a four-year term under a state law mandating a change from 2 to 4 year terms.
