= Calvin Lowry =

American football player and coach (born 1983)

Middle Tennessee Blue Raiders football
- Title: Running backs coach

Personal information
- Born: February 13, 1983 (age 43); Fort Hood, Texas, U.S.
- Listed height: 5 ft 11 in (1.80 m)
- Listed weight: 200 lb (91 kg)

Career information
- High school: Fayetteville (NC) Douglas Byrd
- College: Penn State
- NFL draft: 2006: 4th round, 102nd overall pick

Career history

Playing
- Tennessee Titans (2006–2007); Denver Broncos (2008); Jacksonville Jaguars (2008); Detroit Lions (2009)*; Omaha Nighthawks (2010)
- * Offseason or practice squad member only

Coaching
- St. Andrew's Episcopal (2011) Assistant; Baylor (2012–2014) Assistant; Tulsa (2015–2022) Wide receivers coach & special teams coach; Penn State (2023) Offensive analyst; Middle Tennessee (2024–present) Running backs coach

Awards and highlights
- First-team All-Big Ten (2005)

Career NFL statistics
- Total tackles: 86
- Forced fumbles: 1
- Pass deflections: 14
- Interceptions: 2
- Stats at Pro Football Reference

Calvin Sinclair Lowry (born February 13, 1983) is an American football coach and former safety.

== Early life ==
Lowry starred at wide receiver and defensive back at Douglas Byrd High School in Fayetteville, North Carolina.

== Playing career ==
He played college football at Penn State.

Pre-draft measurables
| Height | Weight | Arm length | Hand span | 40-yard dash | 10-yard split | 20-yard split | 20-yard shuttle | Three-cone drill | Vertical jump | Broad jump | Bench press |
|---|---|---|---|---|---|---|---|---|---|---|---|
| 5 ft 11 in (1.80 m) | 200 lb (91 kg) | 30 7/8 in (0.78 m) | 9 1/8 in (0.23 m) | 4.50 s | 1.60 s | 2.60 s | 4.19 s | 7.14 s | 36.0 in (0.91 m) | 10 ft 0 in (3.05 m) | 16 reps |
All values from NFL Combine/Pro Day

He was drafted by the Tennessee Titans in the fourth round of the 2006 NFL draft with the 102nd overall pick.

On August 31, 2008, he was claimed by the Denver Broncos.

He was also a member of the Jacksonville Jaguars, Detroit Lions, and Omaha Nighthawks.

=== NFL career statistics ===
| Year | Team | Games | | Tackles | | | | | Interceptions | | | | | | Fumbles | |
| Year | Team | GP | GS | Comb | Solo | Ast | Sack | Sfty | PD | Int | Yds | Avg | Lng | TD | FF | FR |
|---|---|---|---|---|---|---|---|---|---|---|---|---|---|---|---|---|
| 2006 | TEN | 16 | 0 | 13 | 11 | 2 | 0.0 | 0 | 2 | 0 | 0 | 0.0 | 0 | 0 | 1 | 0 |
| 2007 | TEN | 16 | 11 | 62 | 46 | 16 | 0.0 | 0 | 10 | 2 | 18 | 9.0 | 17 | 0 | 0 | 0 |
| 2008 | DEN | 11 | 3 | 18 | 11 | 7 | 0.0 | 0 | 2 | 0 | 0 | 0.0 | 0 | 0 | 0 | 0 |
| Career | | 43 | 14 | 93 | 68 | 25 | 0.0 | 0 | 14 | 2 | 18 | 9.0 | 17 | 0 | 1 | 0 |

== Coaching career ==
In January 2015, he was hired to be an assistant coach at Tulsa.

In January 2023, Lowry joined the staff at his alma mater, Penn State as an offensive analyst.
