= Fred Peters (politician) =

American politician

11th Mayor of Murray, Utah
- In office January 1, 1932 – January 1, 1934
- Preceded by: Arthur Townsend
- Succeeded by: Gottlieb Berger

Personal details
- Born: Frederick Peters; September 21, 1867 Zutphen, Netherlands
- Died: December 26, 1935 (aged 68) Murray, Utah, U.S.
- Spouse: Annie Cannegieter
- Children: 8

Frederick "Fred" Peters was mayor of Murray, Utah, United States, from 1932 to 1934. He was born at Gelderland, Netherlands, and came to Utah at the age of 1. As a young man he worked as a "moler" for the Union Pacific Railway. He later entered the mattress and upholstery business, and eventually started a wallpaper and interior decorating business. In 1912 he became City Marshal, and held this office until 1916. From 1916 to 1931, Peters was the city's health officer. During his administration, the new Murray city electric power plant was completed.

He was an officer in the local Fraternal Order of Eagles. He was also a member of the State Firemen's Association as he was a volunteer in the Murray Fire Department, Yeoman(fraternal order), and Woodmen of the World.

He was most noted for apprehending labor activist Joe Hill, who was charged with murdering a grocer in downtown Salt Lake City. Peters, while City Marshal, shot Hill in the hand when Hill tried to escape from a boardinghouse window, and turned Hill over to Officer Blaine L. Baxter of the Salt Lake City police department.
