= Isaac Lester =

American politician (1875–1956)

9th Mayor of Murray, Utah
- In office January 1, 1923 – January 1, 1929
- Preceded by: Charles Anderson
- Succeeded by: Arthur Townsend

Personal details
- Born: June 29, 1875
- Died: October 2, 1956 (aged 81) San Luis Obispo, California

Isaac Lester (1875–1956) was mayor of Murray, Utah from 1923 to 1929. He was Murray's first mayor to serve three terms. Lester defeated incumbent Charles Anderson. Lester's term was noted for improving a lighting system for the city and offering a contract through Utah Power and Light Company for the service. He was a member of the fraternal order Woodmen of the World. Prior to his election, he was a Sergeant in 4th Regimental Cavalry in the Spanish–American War and was a chief in the Murray fire department.
