= Joseph Stratton =

American politician

2nd Mayor of Murray, Utah
- In office January 1, 1904 – December 31, 1905
- Preceded by: Chillion L. Miller
- Succeeded by: Charles Brown

Personal details
- Born: September 1855 Canada
- Died: 1922 (aged 67–68)
- Spouse: Julia A Bruno

Joseph H. Stratton (September 1854 – 1922) was elected mayor of Murray, Utah from 1904 to 1905. He was one of the first candidates for mayor of the new city, but was defeated by Chillion L. Miller. During Stratton’s administration the Progress Company was granted a franchise to set poles and string wire to carry electric current within the limits of Murray city. In 1904, there was a move to bond the city for the purpose of installing a water system and proposed bonding but the matter did not develop into a bond. Murray city set up its water system and the first 21 hydrants were to be in place and ready for use in December 1905. The following streets received names Murray Street, Vine Street, and Atwood Street. During Mayor Stratton’s term the poll tax was discontinued. Murray also began acquiring or constructing public buildings such as a courthouse and jail.

Political offices
Preceded by Chillion L. Miller	Mayor of Murray, Utah; January 1904 - December 1905	Succeeded by Charles Brown
