= Akarika Dawn =

American athlete and coach

Personal information
- Born: 10 January 1984 (age 42) Houston, Texas, United States
- Height: 6 ft 2 in (1.88 m)
- Weight: 235 lb (107 kg)

Playing information
- Position: second-row, centre
Club
Years	Team	Pld	T	G	FG	P
2007–	Jacksonville Axemen
Representative
Years	Team	Pld	T	G	FG	P
2013	United States	1	0	0	0	0
2016	Canada	1	0	0	0	0
- As of 12 January 2021

Akarika Dawn (born January 10, 1984) is an American athlete and coach who has played both American football and rugby league. He currently plays for the Jacksonville Axemen of the USA Rugby League (USARL). His position is second-row.

Dawn played college football for the University of Colorado Buffaloes as a linebacker. He later had a brief stint with the Austin Wranglers of the Arena Football League (AFL) and then tried his hand at rugby league, playing for the Jacksonville Axemen in Jacksonville, Florida and then the Burleigh Bears in Australia. Since 2010 he has played for Jacksonville and has played for both the United States and Canada.

== Early life and college career ==
Dawn was born in Houston, Texas. He attended Kempner High School in nearby Sugar Land, Texas, where he played high school football. In 2002, he enrolled at the University of Colorado at Boulder, where he committed to play for the Colorado Buffaloes football team. He played inside linebacker for the Buffaloes from 2002 to 2005. In his senior year he appeared in all twelve games, including two starts; he finished his career with 180 tackles (120 solo), 73rd in school history. He graduated in 2006 with a major in Black Studies and Ethnic Studies.

== Rugby League ==
=== International ===
He has won 2 international caps, one each for USA & Canada, respectively.

His US début was on 6 Jul 2013 playing at centre in a Colonial Cup game which USA lost 36–20 to Canada
Ironically, 3 years later on September 24, 2016 his début for Canada was versus United States in the 2016 Americas Championship in which Canada lost 8–14; Akarika played at second-row

== Later career ==
After college Dawn was signed by the Austin Wranglers of the Arena Football League (AFL) in the 2007 season. He served as a linebacker/fullback and made three tackles during his brief AFL career. He was waived in February 2007.

Later that year, at the suggestion of his agent, Nick Attewell, Dawn decided to try his hand at rugby league football, despite having never played the sport before. He committed to trial in Australia in July 2007, and familiarized himself with the game by signing with the Jacksonville Axemen of the American National Rugby League (AMNRL), the United States' premier competition, for the early part of their season. He played three weeks in Jacksonville and quickly became a standout, impressing coach Spinner Howland. In July, he trialed with professional clubs in Australia's National Rugby League, becoming the second Axemen player to do so after Apple Pope. He was ultimately signed by the Burleigh Bears to play in the Queensland Cup.

After his stint in Australia, Dawn returned to the United States, where he coached high school football in his hometown of Houston. In 2010, he returned to rugby league, signing on again with the Jacksonville Axemen, and soon became one of the team's most popular players. That year, he was named in the United States national rugby league team, playing in the 2010 Rugby League Atlantic Cup in Jacksonville. Dawn continued with the Axemen in the 2011 season.

Dawn was employed as a teacher and Linebackers coach at Clear Brook High School in Friendswood, Texas, until early 2014.
