= Gottlieb Berger =

American politician

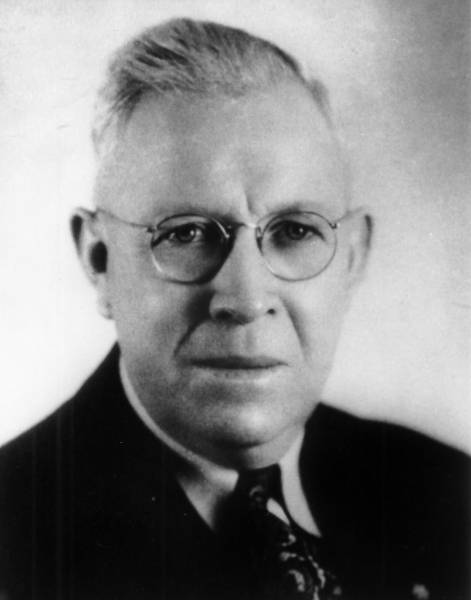

12th Mayor of Murray, Utah
- In office January 1, 1934 – January 1, 1941
- Preceded by: Fred Peters
- Succeeded by: Curtis Shaw

Personal details
- Born: October 3, 1885 Murray, Utah
- Died: December 14, 1973 (aged 88) Murray, Utah
- Spouse: Anna Marie Mall
- Children: 4

Gottlieb R. Berger (October 3, 1885 – December 14, 1973) served as mayor of Murray, Utah from 1934 to 1941. He was a foreman for the American Smelting and Refining Company (ASARCO), and was a member of Fraternal Order of Eagles. He was a son of Murray founding father Gottlieb Berger who served on the city council when the city was incorporated.

As Mayor, he was noted for his efforts to improve roads, especially collaborating with Midvale, Utah to improve roads between the two cities. He died December 14, 1973.
