= John Fitzgerald (quarterback) =

American football player and coach (born 1975)

No. 16
- Position: Quarterback

Personal information
- Born: April 14, 1975 (age 51); Oklahoma, U.S.
- Listed height: 6 ft 4 in (1.93 m)
- Listed weight: 230 lb (104 kg)

Career information
- High school: Seminole (OK)
- College: Tulsa
- NFL draft: 1999: undrafted

Career history

Playing
- Grand Rapids Rampage (2000)*; Tampa Bay Storm (2000)*; Houston ThunderBears (2001); Tampa Bay Storm (2002)*; Carolina Cobras (2002); Dallas Desperados (2003); New Orleans VooDoo (2004); Austin Wranglers (2005–2006); Kansas City Brigade (2008); Grand Rapids Rampage (2008)
- * Offseason or practice squad member only

Coaching
- Oklahoma City Yard Dawgz (2007)

Career AFL statistics
- Comp. / Att.: 1,315 / 2,090
- Passing yards: 14,997
- TD–INT: 249–65
- Passer rating: 101.24
- Rushing TD: 35
- Stats at ArenaFan.com

John Fitzgerald (born April 14, 1975) is an American former football quarterback. He last played for the Kansas City Brigade of the Arena Football League (AFL). He was previously the head coach of af2's Oklahoma City Yard Dawgz where he compiled a 7–9 record in his one-season .

At the University of Tulsa, Fitzgerald finished as the school's second all-time passer.

Turning professional, Fitzgerald signed with the Grand Rapids Rampage on March 13, 2000, but was traded to the Tampa Bay Storm on April 11, 2000, and then placed on injured reserve on April 30, 2000. He was waived by the Storm and signed off of waivers by the Houston ThunderBears on April 10, 2001. He then was the starting quarterback for Houston in the 2002 season, and played for the Carolina Cobras, Dallas Desperados, New Orleans VooDoo and Austin Wranglers over the rest of his career. His best season was in 2005 when he led the Wranglers to their lone playoff appearance after tossing 73 TDs and passing for 3,961 yards. In his career, he’s led three different teams to the postseason (Carolina, New Orleans and Austin).

== Head coaching record ==
Team	Year	Regular season				Postseason			
Team	Year	Won	Lost	Win %	Finish	Won	Lost	Win %	Result
OKC	2007	7	9	.438	3rd in Central	0	1	.000	Lost to Tulsa Talons in wild card round
Total		7	9	.438		0	1	.000	
