= Skip Foster =

American football coach (1960–2024)

Biographical details
- Born: September 16, 1960; Kansas City, Missouri, U.S.
- Died: May 2, 2024 (aged 63)

Playing career

Football
- 1979–1980: Coffeyville
- 1981–1982: Missouri Western
- Positions: Center, offensive guard

Coaching career (HC unless noted)

Football
- 1983: Missouri Western (SA)
- 1984: Memphis State (GA)
- 1985–1988: Coffeyville (assistant)
- 1989–2000: Coffeyville
- 2001–2003: Tulsa Talons
- 2004–2006: Austin Wranglers
- 2007: Columbus Destroyers (OC)
- 2007–2009: Arizona Rattlers (OC)
- 2008: Kansas City Brigade (OC)

Head coaching record
- Overall: 82–39–2 (junior college football)
- Bowls: 2–4 (junior college)
- Tournaments: 13–10 (KJCCC playoffs)

Accomplishments and honors

Championships
- Football; 1 NJCAA National (1990); 6 KJCCC regular season (1990–1993, 1996–1997); 2 KJCCC playoffs (1990, 1996)

Richard Link "Skip" 'Foster (September 16, 1960 – May 2, 2024) was an American football coach. He served as the head football coach at Coffeyville Community College from 1989 to 2000, compiling a record of 82–39–2. He led his Coffeyville Red Ravens team to an NJCAA National Football Championship in 1990. Foster was also the head coach of the Tulsa Talons of the AF2 from 2001 to 2003 and the Austin Wranglers of the Arena Football League (AFL) from 2004 to 2006.

Foster was born on September 16, 1960, in Kansas City, Missouri, and graduated from Platte County High School, in Platte City, Missouri, in 1979. He played football at Coffeyville in 1979 and 1980 as a center on teams coached by his father, Dick Foster. He then played at Missouri Western State College—now known as Missouri Western State University—as a center and offensive guard.

Foster was a student assistant at Missouri Western and then a graduate assistant at Memphis State University—now known as the University of Memphis—before returning to Coffeyville as an assistant coach in 1985. Foster succeeded his father as head football coach at Coffeyville in 1989. He was also the track coach at Coffeyville. He resigned after the 2000 season to become head coach of the Tulsa Talons.

Foster died on May 2, 2024, after suffering from cancer.

== Head coaching record ==
=== Junior college football ===
Year	Team	Overall	Conference	Standing	Bowl/playoffs
Coffeyville Red Ravens (Kansas Jayhawk Community College Conference) (1989–2000)
1989	Coffeyville	6–3	5–1	2nd	L KJCCC semifinal
1990	Coffeyville	11–0	6–0	1st	W KJCCC championship, W Mid-American Bowl
1991	Coffeyville	6–3–1	4–1–1	T–1st	L KJCCC championship
1992	Coffeyville	7–4	5–1	1st	L KJCCC championship, L Texas Shrine Bowl
1993	Coffeyville	9–2	5–1	1st	L KJCCC championship, W Dixie Rotary Bowl
1994	Coffeyville	4–5	3–3	T–3rd	L KJCCC first round
1995	Coffeyville	6–3–1	4–1–1	3rd	L KJCCC semifinal
1996	Coffeyville	9–2	6–1	T–1st	W KJCCC championship, L Mineral Water Bowl
1997	Coffeyville	9–3	6–1	T–1st	L KJCCC championship, L Mineral Water Bowl
1998	Coffeyville	6–4	5–2	T–2nd	L KJCCC semifinal, L Red River Bowl
1999	Coffeyville	5–5	3–4	5th	L KJCCC semifinal
2000	Coffeyville	4–5	3–4	T–5th	L KJCCC quarterfinal
Coffeyville:		82–39–2	55–20–2		
Total:		82–39–2			
National championship Conference title Conference division title or championship game berth
