= Damon Mason =

American football player and coach (born 1974)

No. 9
- Position: Defensive back

Personal information
- Born: April 21, 1974 (age 52); LaPlace, Louisiana, U.S.
- Listed height: 5 ft 9 in (1.75 m)
- Listed weight: 175 lb (79 kg)

Career information
- High school: Destrehan (LA)
- College: Southwestern Louisiana
- NFL draft: 1997: undrafted

Career history

Playing
- Orlando Predators (1998–2001); New Jersey/Las Vegas Gladiators (2002–2003); Orlando Predators (2004); Carolina Cobras (2004); Orlando Predators (2005); Grand Rapids Rampage (2005); Austin Wranglers (2006–2007); Orlando Predators (2008); Utah Blaze (2008); Orlando Predators (2010); New Orleans VooDoo (2011)

Coaching
- New Orleans VooDoo (DB) (2014); Dunwoody HS (GA) (assistant) (2015); Jacksonville Sharks (DC/ST) (2017); Jacksonville Sharks (assistant) (2018)

Awards and highlights
- 2× ArenaBowl champion (1998, 2000); NAL champion (2017); 3× Second-team All-Arena (2000, 2001, 2002); AFL career tackle leader

Career AFL statistics
- Tackles: 1009
- Pass breakups: 173
- Forced fumbles: 21
- Fumble recoveries: 10
- Interceptions: 44
- Stats at ArenaFan.com

Damon Mason (born April 21, 1974) is an American former professional football defensive back who played in the Arena Football League (AFL).

== Playing career ==
=== High school ===
Mason played high school football at Destrehan High School.

=== College career ===
Mason played college football at the University of Southwestern Louisiana and Jones County Junior College. He spent 1992 as redshirt freshman at Southwestern Louisiana before transferring to Jones County for the 1993 season. In 1994, Mason returned to Southwestern Louisiana and played through 1996. He finished his career at Southwestern Louisiana with 243 total tackles, 28 tackles for loss, four sacks and six interceptions and had his number was retired by the school. In 2018, he was inducted into the University of Louisiana at Lafayette (formerly Southwestern Louisiana) Athletics Hall of Fame.

=== Professional career ===
Mason played in the Arena Football League (AFL) for the Orlando Predators, New Jersey/Las Vegas Gladiators, Carolina Cobras, Grand Rapids Rampage, Austin Wranglers, Utah Blaze and New Orleans VooDoo. He retired as the AFL career tackle leader.

== Coaching career ==
In 2014, Mason was hired as the defensive backs coach with the AFL's, New Orleans VooDoo. In 2015, he was an assistant coach at Dunwoody High School in Dunwoody, Georgia. In June 2017, Mason was named defensive coordinator and special teams coach of the Jacksonville Sharks in the National Arena League and in 2018, he was a part-time assistant coach with the team. In 2018, he was announced as head coach of the Louisiana Red Sticks in the National Gridiron League, however, the league did not play that season and he is no longer listed as the coach of the proposed team.
