= Ted Eyre =

American politician (1946–2017)

Mayor of Murray, Utah
- In office January 1, 2014 – August 25, 2017
- Preceded by: Dan Snarr
- Succeeded by: D. Blair Camp

Personal details
- Born: August 14, 1946 Rawlins, Wyoming
- Died: August 25, 2017 (aged 71) Murray, Utah
- Party: Republican
- Spouse: Ruth Peters Eyre
- Children: 4
- Education: San Bernardino Valley College

David Ted Eyre (August 14, 1946 – August 25, 2017) was mayor of Murray, Utah from 2014 to 2017. Elected to a four-year term as Murray City mayor in 2013, Eyre began his term on January 7, 2014. He was unable to complete his full term in office, dying of prostate cancer at age 71. Eyre is the first Murray Mayor to not complete a full term, which resulted in the appointment of an acting and interim mayor by the Murray City Council.

Eyre was born and raised in Wyoming and graduated from Cheyenne East High School. He attended Brigham Young University and San Bernardino Valley College where he received his degree in Aviation Sciences.

Eyre joined the United States Army and served a tour in the Vietnam War flying a U-21 Ute transport aircraft in the aviation division of the Signal Corps. After returning home, he worked on construction projects in Colorado before becoming a flight instructor in the San Francisco Bay Area of California. He eventually became a pilot for Western Airlines which was acquired by Delta Air Lines in 1986. He relocated to Murray City in 1987, where he retired as a Delta Air Lines captain in 2005.

During Mayor Eyre's term enhancements were made to Murray City Park including Wi-Fi throughout the park, six pickleball courts, an outdoor exercise area, new restrooms and the newly remodeled Murray Park Amphitheater. During his administration, the City acquired historic Murray Theater, Murray Chapel and Murray Mansion for the downtown redevelopment project area and property for future construction of a new fire station and city hall.
