= Mark Lewis (kicker) =

American football player (born 1979)

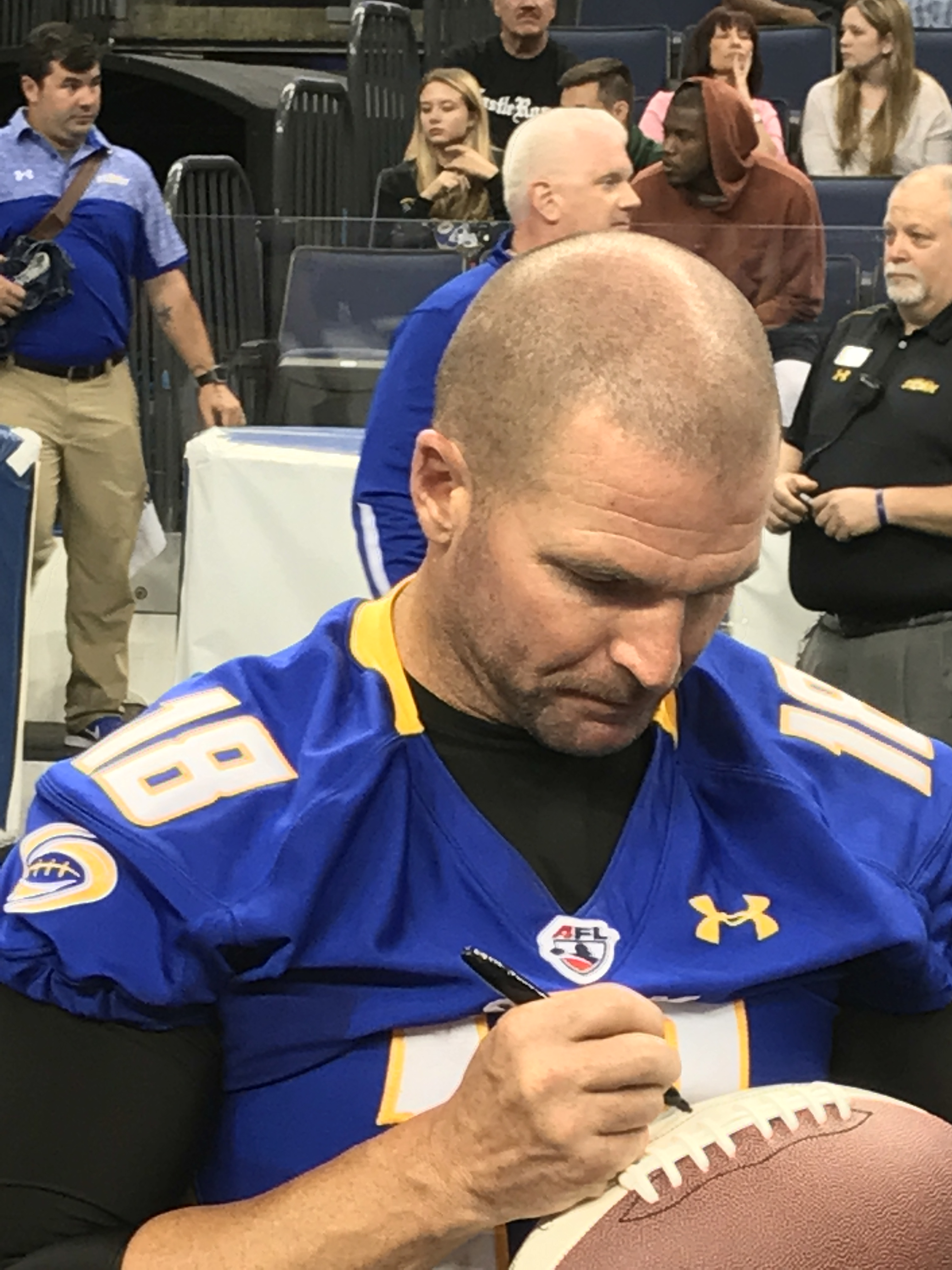
- Lewis in with the Tampa Bay Storm in 2017

No. 10, 18, 19
- Position: Kicker

Personal information
- Born: March 25, 1979 (age 47); Altamonte Springs, Florida, U.S.
- Listed height: 5 ft 11 in (1.80 m)
- Listed weight: 200 lb (91 kg)

Career information
- High school: Longwood (FL) Lyman
- College: FIU
- NFL draft: 2003: undrafted

Career history
- Tennessee Valley Vipers (2003); Detroit Fury (2004); Las Vegas Gladiators (2005); Columbus Destroyers (2006); Austin Wranglers (2007); Columbus Destroyers (2008); Dallas Vigilantes (2010); Orlando Predators (2011–2016); Tampa Bay Storm (2017); Baltimore Brigade (2018); Atlantic City Blackjacks (2019)

Awards and highlights
- 2× First-team All-Arena (2007, 2018); Second-team All-Arena (2016); 2× AFL Kicker of the Year (2007), (2018); Second-team All-Arena (2015)

Career AFL statistics
- FG made: 108
- FG att: 197
- PAT made: 1,238
- PAT att: 1,397
- Tackles: 41.5
- Stats at ArenaFan.com

Mark Lewis (born March 25, 1979) is an American former professional football placekicker who played in the Arena Football League (AFL) for the Detroit Fury, Las Vegas Gladiators, Columbus Destroyers, Austin Wranglers, Dallas Vigilantes, Orlando Predators, Tampa Bay Storm, Baltimore Brigade, and Atlantic City Blackjacks. He also played for the Tennessee Valley Vipers of the af2.

== Early life ==
Lewis attended Lyman High School in Longwood, Florida, where he was a two sport athlete, participating soccer and football. Lewis was one of the top prep players in the state of Florida for soccer. He joined the football team after his friend, Joe Gioia, had dared Lewis that he couldn't kick a football as far as a soccer ball.

== College career ==
Lewis continued his soccer career when he earned a scholarship to play at Florida International University. After one season at FIU, Lewis transferred to University of North Carolina at Charlotte, where he played a single season for the 49ers before quitting soccer.

== Professional career ==
Lewis began playing professional football in 2003, when he signed with the Tennessee Valley Vipers of af2. Playing for the Austin Wranglers in 2007, Lewis enjoyed the best year of his career, earning First Team All-Arena honors and was named the AFL Kicker of the Year. On March 21, 2018, Lewis was assigned to the Baltimore Brigade. With the Brigade, Lewis won his second Kicker of the Year award in 2018. His no. 19 worn during his time with the Brigade is a tribute to the late Baltimore Colts great Johnny Unitas, who wore that number. On March 6, 2019, Lewis was assigned to the expansion Atlantic City Blackjacks.
