= Brian Partlow =

American football player and coach

Career history
- Albany Firebirds (2000–2003) (Asst); Colorado Crush (2004–2006) (OC); Austin Wranglers (2007) (HC); Cleveland Gladiators (2008) (OC)

Awards and highlights
- ArenaBowl champion (2005)

Brian Partlow is a former arena football coach. He last served as the offensive coordinator of the Cleveland Gladiators in the Arena Football League (AFL). He was the head coach for the Austin Wranglers in 2007, where he had a record of 4–12. He spent the 2006, 2005, and 2004 seasons as the offensive coordinator of the Colorado Crush. The Crush won the ArenaBowl championship in 2005. Partlow led one of the top ranked offenses in the league helping WR Damian Harrell win offensive player of the year in 2005 and 2006 while breaking the single season record for receiving touchdowns. In 2003, 2002, 2001, and 2000 Partlow coached for the Albany/Indiana Firebirds in the AFL spending two seasons as the offensive coordinator. Partlow also has experience coaching college football including stops at The College of William and Mary, Shenandoah College, and Randolph Macon College.

== Biography ==
In college, Partlow broke numerous school and conference records as a quarterback at Randolph-Macon College. He arrived at Randolph-Macon after transferring from The College of William and Mary.

In high school, Partlow was named to numerous all-American teams, was named the Virginia High School Coaches Association Offensive Player of the Year, was named the Co-Offensive Player of the Year by the Washington Post, and was named the starting quarterback in the Virginia High School Coaches Association All-Star Game all while leading the Handley Judges to an undefeated season and the AA state championship.
