= George Huscher =

American politician

7th Mayor of Murray, Utah
- In office January 1912 – January 1916
- Preceded by: Phillip Bentz
- Succeeded by: James W. McHenry

Personal details
- Born: September 1, 1865 Windsor, Ontario, Canada
- Died: February 1, 1944 (aged 79) Long Beach, California
- Party: Socialist
- Spouse: Elizabeth Huscher
- Children: 2

George Albert Huscher was elected mayor of Murray, Utah from 1912 and re-elected in 1914. He ran for the statewide office of Secretary of State in 1916 but was defeated. He remains to date the Socialist party’s highest elected official in Utah. Murray had a huge labor and union population that was affiliated with the many smelter operations in the area, which backed Murray’s Socialist party over the competing Citizen’s party. Huscher’s victory caused a two-day celebration, including a parade and bonfires that was finally put to an end by the city marshal. Huscher was born in Windsor, Ontario Canada. He came to Murray in 1900 and owned the Murray City Pharmacy until 1920 when he moved to California. He was a member of the Fraternal Order of Eagles.

During his tenure he started the present Murray City Power Department was instrumental in developing the cities municipal power plant despite the fact that he was faced with powerful opposition in its creation. He would retire from public life and moved to Long Beach, California, where he died in 1944.
