= Adrian McPherson =

American football player (born 1983)

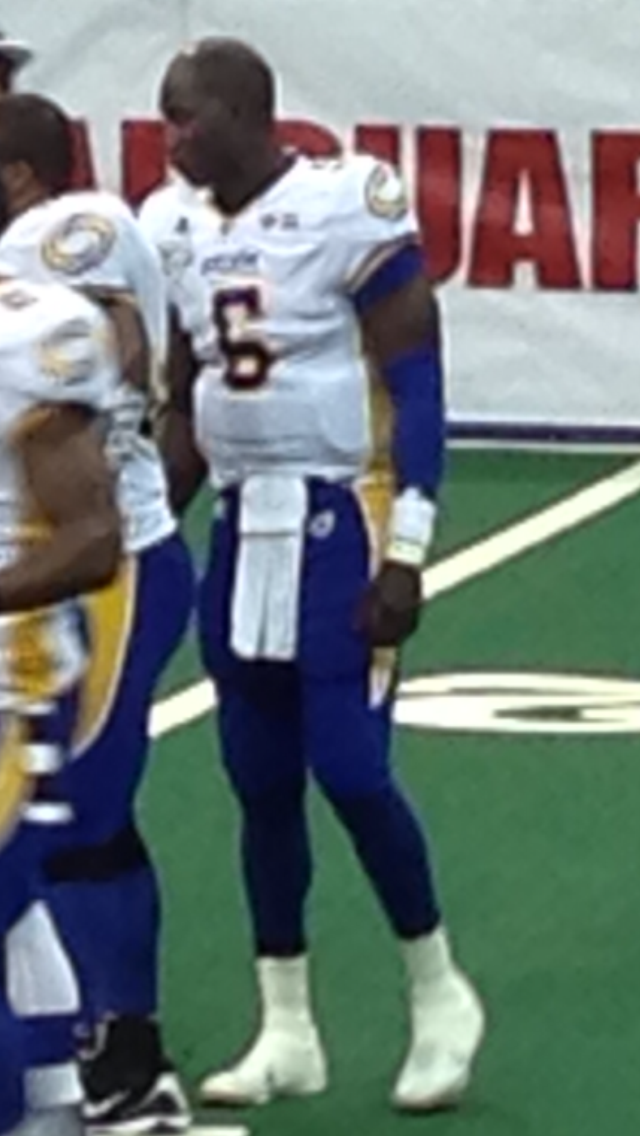
- McPherson with the Tampa Bay Storm in 2013

No. 5
- Position: Quarterback

Personal information
- Born: May 8, 1983 (age 43); Bradenton, Florida, U.S.
- Listed height: 6 ft 3 in (1.91 m)
- Listed weight: 220 lb (100 kg)

Career information
- High school: Southeast (Bradenton)
- College: Florida State
- NFL draft: 2005: 5th round, 152nd overall pick

Career history
- Indiana Firebirds (2004); New Orleans Saints (2005–2006); Utah Blaze (2007)*; Austin Wranglers (2007); Grand Rapids Rampage (2007–2008); Montreal Alouettes (2008–2012); Tampa Bay Storm (2013); Calgary Stampeders (2014)*; Los Angeles KISS (2015); Toronto Argonauts (2015–2016); Jacksonville Sharks (2018)
- * Offseason or practice squad member only

Awards and highlights
- 2× Grey Cup champion (2009, 2010); AFL Rookie of the Year (2004); AFL season record for rushing TDs by a QB (2013)

Career CFL statistics
- Passing yards: 1,505
- TD–INT: 10–6
- Passer rating: 81.1
- Stats at CFL.ca (archived)

Career AFL statistics
- Passing yards: 11,108
- TD–INT: 193–25
- Passer rating: 109.86
- Rushing yards: 1,266
- Rushing touchdowns: 73
- Stats at ArenaFan.com

Adrian Jamal McPherson (born May 8, 1983) is an American former professional football player who was a quarterback in the Arena Football League (AFL) and Canadian Football League (CFL). He played college football at Florida State before being dismissed from the team as a result of a November 2002 arrest. He was selected by the New Orleans Saints in the fifth round of the 2005 NFL draft. As a professional, McPherson was also a member of the Indiana Firebirds, Utah Blaze, Austin Wranglers, Grand Rapids Rampage, Tampa Bay Storm and Los Angeles KISS of the AFL, the Montreal Alouettes, Calgary Stampeders and Toronto Argonauts of the CFL, and the Jacksonville Sharks of the National Arena League (NAL).

== Early life ==
McPherson is a former Florida Mr. Basketball and Mr. Football Florida (the first athlete to have awarded both honors in Florida history) as a student at Southeast High School in Bradenton, Florida, He began his career at Florida State playing quarterback on the football team and point guard on the basketball team after attending Southeast High School in Bradenton, Florida, where he was named Gatorade Florida Football Player of the season, passing for 3,728 yards and 42 touchdowns and rushing for 765 yards and 10 touchdowns as a senior at Southeast. Additionally, he played third base for his American Legion baseball team, which won a state championship in the summer of 2002.

== College career and dismissal ==
McPherson played two seasons (2001–02) at Florida State University. As a true freshman, McPherson appeared in nine games with the Seminoles in 2001, completing 23 of 37 passes for 214 yards and two touchdowns. As a sophomore in 2002, McPherson started four games, completing 80 of 156 passes for 1,017 yards, 12 touchdowns and one interception while rushing for 180 yards on 48 carries. McPherson was dismissed from the football team by Florida State coaches in November 2002 amid reports that police planned to question him in connection with check theft and forgery charges; McPherson was later arrested.

After McPherson's initial arrest in November 2002, additional charges were brought by Florida State university police in March 2003 alleging McPherson's participation in a gambling scheme whereby McPherson placed bets on Florida State football games he participated in. McPherson pleaded no contest to all charges in connection with both the check fraud and later gambling charges as part of a plea deal in July 2003; McPherson received no jail time in exchange for probation and community service as part of the deal.

Following the plea deal, McPherson briefly attempted to enroll at Tennessee State in August 2003, however, Tennessee State coaches later issued a release stating they had determined it would not be appropriate for McPherson to join the team.

=== Statistics ===
Season	Team	Passing								Rushing			
Season	Team	Cmp	Att	Pct	Yds	Y/A	TD	Int	Rtg	Att	Yds	Avg	TD
2001	Florida State	18	37	48.6	198	5.4	2	0	111.4	23	16	0.7	0
2002	Florida State	80	155	51.6	1,017	6.6	12	1	131.0	48	180	3.8	0
Career		98	192	51.0	1,215	6.3	14	1	127.2	71	196	2.8	0

== Professional career ==
Pre-draft measurables
Height	Weight	40-yard dash	10-yard split	20-yard split	20-yard shuttle	Three-cone drill	Vertical jump	Broad jump	Bench press	Wonderlic
6 ft 3 in (1.91 m)	218 lb (99 kg)	4.72 s	1.68 s	2.73 s	4.08 s	6.93 s	34 1/2 in (0.88 m)	10 ft 8 in (3.25 m)	22 reps	26
All values from NFL Combine

=== Indiana Firebirds ===
Although potentially eligible for the 2004 NFL draft, amidst potential character concerns expressed by NFL teams, McPherson instead opted to play in the Arena Football League (AFL), signing with the Indiana Firebirds. In one season with the Firebirds, McPherson threw for 61 touchdowns against 5 interceptions, adding an additional 19 rushing touchdowns. As a result of his play, McPherson was named the 2004 AFL Rookie of the Year.

=== New Orleans Saints ===
McPherson was selected by the New Orleans Saints in the fifth round of the 2005 NFL draft. As a rookie, McPherson made limited appearances in Saints preseason games prior to the 2005 NFL season. At the time, the Saints had hoped McPherson could eventually develop into the team's starting quarterback. However, following McPherson's rookie year, the Saints signed free agent quarterback Drew Brees, who went on to lead the Saints to the 2006 NFC Championship Game in his first season with the team.

On August 12, 2006, McPherson was hit by a golf cart driven by the Tennessee Titans mascot during half-time of a preseason game at LP Field. On December 8, 2006, McPherson sued the Titans, seeking $15 million in punitive damages and $5 million in compensatory damages. Following injuries sustained in the incident, McPherson was cut by the Saints in September 2006.

=== Utah Blaze / Austin Wranglers ===
Before McPherson signed with the Saints following the 2005 NFL draft, he was acquired from the Indiana Firebirds by the new Utah Blaze of the AFL in their 2005 expansion draft. The move was widely considered to be a gamble, considering his unknown status before the NFL's 2005 draft. Following the NFL draft, McPherson was placed by the AFL on the "other-league exempt list" until further notice. On November 9, 2006, McPherson was activated by the AFL and a week later traded to the Austin Wranglers in exchange for future considerations.

=== Grand Rapids Rampage ===
McPherson was signed by the AFL's Grand Rapids Rampage in 2007 as a back-up quarterback for Chad Salisbury. That season for the Rampage, he completed 76 of 129 passes for 819 yards and nine touchdowns with four interceptions.

In 2008, McPherson went 27-for-50 for 368 yards and four touchdowns with no interceptions. He was released by the team in April.

=== Montreal Alouettes ===
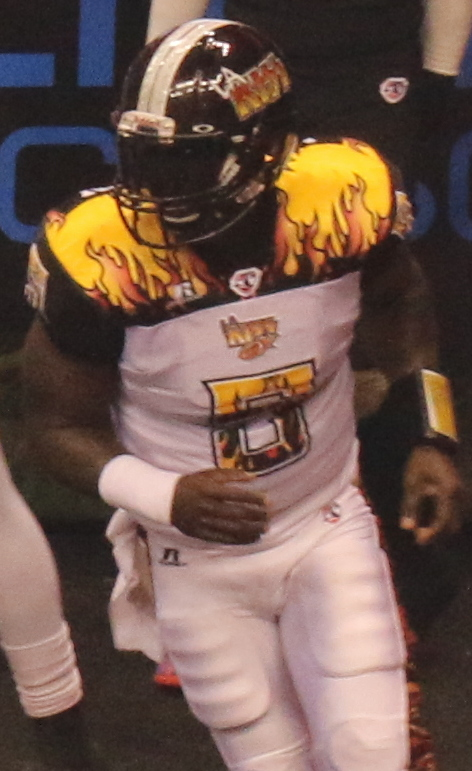
McPherson with the Los Angeles KISS in 2015

In May 2008, McPherson was signed by the Montreal Alouettes of the Canadian Football League (CFL). He debuted with the Alouettes in a CFL pre-season game, on June 12, 2008, against the Toronto Argonauts. He completed four of eight passes for 105 yards, and one touchdown pass. The Alouettes and Argonauts played to a 34–34 tie in Montreal. McPherson spent five seasons as the back up to franchise quarterback Anthony Calvillo, winning the Grey Cup in 2009 and 2010. Two weeks before entering free agency, McPherson was released on February 1, 2013, so that he could pursue offers from other teams.

=== Tampa Bay Storm ===
On February 19, 2013, McPherson signed with the AFL's Tampa Bay Storm. On May 10, 2013, McPherson broke the AFL record for rushing touchdowns in a season by a quarterback. Two months later McPherson's season ended with a right leg injury.

=== Calgary Stampeders ===
In January 2014, McPherson was signed by the Calgary Stampeders of the CFL.

=== Los Angeles KISS ===
On October 28, 2014, McPherson was assigned to the Los Angeles KISS of the AFL.

=== Toronto Argonauts ===
After recovering from an injury that he received during his tenure with the LA KISS, McPherson was signed by the CFL's Toronto Argonauts on June 13, 2015. However, one year later, he was released by the Argonauts (on Wednesday, June 15, 2016). On July 20, 2016, he was re-signed by the Argonauts; but on August 27, 2016, he was released again.

=== Jacksonville Sharks ===
McPherson signed with the Jacksonville Sharks of the National Arena League in April 2018. McPherson was released on July 18, 2018.

== See also ==
- List of Arena Football League and National Football League players
