= Chad Dukes (American football) =

American football player (born 1971)

No. 32, 42
- Position: Running back

Personal information
- Born: December 29, 1971 (age 54); Albany, New York, U.S.

Career information
- College: Pittsburgh

Career history
- 1996–1998: Albany Firebirds
- 1998: San Diego Chargers*
- 1999-2000: Washington Redskins
- 2000: Jacksonville Jaguars
- 2000: St. Louis Rams
- 2001: Carolina Panthers*
- 2002: Los Angeles Avengers
- 2004–2005: Colorado Crush
- 2006: Philadelphia Soul
- 2007: Austin Wranglers
- * Offseason or practice squad member only

Awards and highlights
- ArenaBowl champion (2005); First-team All-Arena (1997, 1998); Second-team All-Arena (2002); AFL Ironman of the Year (1998)
- Stats at Pro Football Reference

Chad Everett Dukes (born December 29, 1971) is an American former professional football player who was a running back in the National Football League (NFL) for the Washington Redskins (1998–2000), San Diego Chargers (1998), St. Louis Rams (2000) and Jacksonville Jaguars (2000). He played college football for the Pittsburgh Panthers. Dukes played two games total in his NFL career (one for the Jaguars and one for the Redskins). He also played on the Albany Firebirds (1998–1999) before his NFL career, the Colorado Crush (2004), the and the Philadelphia Soul after his NFL career in the Arena Football League. Dukes won AFL Ironman of the Year in 1998 when he was with the Firebirds. In 2004, he was a part of the 2004 Crush ArenaBowl XIX championship team.
