= Dan Snarr =

American politician

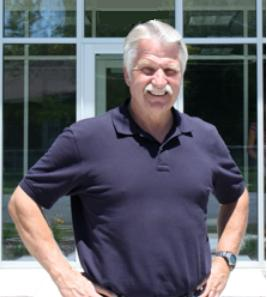

Mayor of Murray, Utah
- In office January 1, 1998 – January 1, 2014
- Preceded by: Lynn Pett
- Succeeded by: Ted Eyre

Personal details
- Born: September 28, 1949 (age 77) Murray, Utah
- Party: Democratic
- Spouse: April Thompson
- Children: 5
- Education: University of Utah

Daniel C. Snarr is a four-time elected mayor of Murray, Utah. Snarr was first elected in 1997 and was re-elected for a fourth consecutive term that began in January 2010 and ended in January 2014. As a former mayor in a Mayor / Council form of government, Murray City employed 396 full- and part-time employees and 487 seasonal employees. Snarr oversaw a budget of $83 million.

Snarr, who was raised in the Millcreek area, moved to Murray with his family in 1978 and decided to run for mayor in the mid-'90s. His relatives have lived in Murray for generations. Snarr attended the University of Utah and earned a Bachelor of Science in Organizational Communications. He also served a two-year mission in Scotland for the Church of Jesus Christ of Latter-day Saints (LDS Church). Mayor Snarr also served as a demolition expert in the 19th Special Forces Group of the Utah National Guard.

Prior to serving as Mayor, he was a co-owner of Snarr Brothers Landscaping, a property maintenance business in Utah. Maintaining his Murray roots, Snarr Brothers is housed in a historic house, which the mayor restored.

Snarr is married to April Thompson Snarr. He has five children and three grandchildren. He is the father of actor Trevor Snarr.

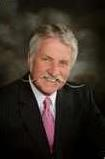
Dan Snarr with long mustache

Snarr said he decided to seek public office because he wanted to continue the work of former Mayor Lynn Pett. During Snarr’s tenure in office, Murray saw the cleanup of the smelter site that is now the home of the Intermountain Medical Center; the property cleanup to establish the 32-acre (130,000 m^{2}) Willow Pond Park; and the revitalization of the city's gateway at 5300 South Street and State Street. (The area used to bring in less than $200,000 in sales-tax revenue; now it generates some $2 million.). Murray also became involved in the Utah Telecommunication Open Infrastructure Agency (UTOPIA) community FTTH program.

Snarr has much well known personal flair, such as driving a Harley Davidson motorcycle while wearing leather garb. Perhaps his most famous trademark is his handlebar mustache which reached a total length of one-foot. His mustache received national attention when Murray hosted a hometown segment of the show American Idol. Snarr was seen onstage with contestant David Archuleta, and generated banter from host Ryan Seacrest concerning the mustache’s length. This national recognition caused the mayor to receive mention from the American Mustache Institute and Esquire magazine. By April 2012, however, he had grown a variation on the mustache, featuring long muttonchop-style whiskers that are waxed at the end. In 2013, he was one of nine mayors who established July 15 as Social Media Giving Day, encouraging citizens to support charities via social media.

After completing his time as Murray City Mayor, Snarr was the Democratic Party nominee for a seat on the Salt Lake County Council. He was defeated in November 2014 by Republican incumbent Aimee Winder Newton 55% to 45%.

== Shave off mustache for charity ==
In May 2009, Snarr entered in a shave-or save battle. He set to shave his nearly foot-long handlebar mustache for charity, supporting the Children's Miracle Network. Snarr, who has sported the waxed mustache for three years, put the decision to a vote of Murray residents, and says: "People are voting 'shave.' It's a way to get back at an elected official." A local Costco warehouse store says residents have been voting since May 1. The paper ballots will be counted May 16. But when the American Mustache Institute took notice of his plans, called on Snarr to "keep a stiff upper lip in the face of opposition." The American Mustache Institute demanded Snarr "recant" his shaving pledge and find another way to support the Children's Miracle Network. "This could include shaving your head, your back or committing to not clipping your toenails for up to eight months," the group's leaders wrote to the mayor. Aaron Perlut, chairman of the American Mustache Institute, said that Snarr "should face down his opposition—mainly women—and keep his mustache." Snarr said he had never heard of the American Mustache Institute and isn't certain how to respond to the letter. "It's like politics—whatever you do, you're damned," he said.

However, the appeals American Mustache Institute were in vain. With a vote of 966 to 1,254, more people voted for shaving the mustache than to save it. Residents had to pay $1 for each vote, and some contributed extra. That means Snarr raised at least $2,220 for the Children's Miracle Network. Snarr's wife, April, did the honors, leaving him with a short mustache after a clipping ceremony at a local Costco, on May 16. Following the events, the American Mustache Institute posted a tongue-in-cheek eulogy for the mayor's mustache on its website.
