= Dane Krager =

American football player (born 1979)

Profile
- Positions: Fullback, linebacker

Personal information
- Born: May 18, 1979 (age 47); Austin, Texas, U.S.
- Listed height: 6 ft 3 in (1.91 m)
- Listed weight: 232 lb (105 kg)

Career information
- High school: Leander (Leander, Texas)
- College: Angelo State
- NFL draft: 2002: undrafted

Career history
- Minnesota Vikings (2002)*; Seattle Seahawks (2003–2004)*; Rhein Fire (2003); Austin Wranglers (2004–2007); Arizona Rattlers (2008)*
- * Offseason or practice squad member only

Awards and highlights
- Preseason All-American (2000); All-Lone Star Conference (2001); First-team Daktronics (2001); Little All-American (2001); co-Defensive Player of the Year (2001); 1× All-Ironman Team (2005); Al Lucas Hero Award (2005)

Career AFL statistics as of 2008
- Carries: 144
- Rushing yards: 439
- Touchdowns: 23
- Tackles / Sacks: 74 / 7.5
- Interceptions: 2
- Stats at ArenaFan.com

Dane Krager (born May 18, 1979) is an American former arena football fullback and linebacker. He played college football at Angelo State.

In his career, Krager has played for the Minnesota Vikings, Seattle Seahawks, Austin Wranglers, and Arizona Rattlers. As well as owning his own fitness business, Dane's Body Shop, in Austin, Texas.

== Early life ==
Krager attended Leander High School, where he was an All-District and honorable mention All-State selection, setting a school record for the most tackles in a game (24).

== College career ==
Krager attended Angelo State University where he ranked first in school history with 31 career sacks. He finished his college career ranking ninth on the school's career tackle list. In 1999, Krager set the Angelo State single-season record with 15 sacks. He was also chosen as a preseason All-American in 2000. In 2001, he was a First-team Daktronics, Little All-American and co-Defensive Player of the Year selection after finishing the season with 96 tackles and eight sacks. He was a First-team All-Lone Star Conference selection in 2001. He also threw the javelin for their state track team.

== Professional career ==
=== National Football League ===
Krager originally signed with the Minnesota Vikings in 2002, as an undrafted free agent. However, he was released from the team in the final cuts. In 2003, Krager signed as a free agent with the Seattle Seahawks and was allocated to NFL Europe where he played for Rhein Fire. He was released by the Seahawks after the following training camp.

=== Arena Football League ===
On December 23, 2003 he was signed by the Austin Wranglers of the Arena Football League, where he rushed for over 20 yards in three games and ranked 10th in the AFL for rushing. In 2004 he led the team in rushing with 41 attempts for 152 yards and five touchdowns. In 2005, he rushed 31 times for 59 yards and five touchdowns and recorded seven receptions for 65 yards and a touchdown. He was named the US Army Ironman of the Game for a road game against the Las Vegas Gladiators after recording a game changing interception and fumble recovery in his first game since knee surgery. He also earned ADT defensive Player of the Game honors against the Orlando Predators with two tackles, two passes defended and one fumble recovery for a touchdown. In 2006, he was 2nd the league in rushing with 197 yards and set a Wranglers team-record with 12 rushing touchdowns. He started the entire regular season, playing both offense and defense in 13 out of 15 games. For his work, he earned All-Ironman. Off the field, Krager’s work with the community earned him the Al Lucas Hero Award, which recognizes the Arena Football League player who “makes the most significant contribution to both his community and the game of Arena Football.” Krager also earned US Army Ironman of the Game honors in three games; against the Gladiators, at the Arizona Rattlers and against the Grand Rapids Rampage. He was also named Offensive Player of the game at Orlando. In 2007, 21 tackles, three sacks, and one interception. He also recorded 28 yards rushing and nine receiving yards, he was also named to the All-Ironman team.

In early 2008, Krager signed with the Arizona Rattlers. On February 11, 2008, he was placed on the Rattlers "Left squad" list. As a result, he did not play during the 2008 season. On September 19, he was released by the Rattlers.

== Outside football ==
Krager owns his own fitness business/studio, Dane's Body Shop - Fitness Synergy, in Austin (www.danesbodyshop.com). In 2005, he played the stunt double role of former Denver Bronco Bill Romanowski in the Adam Sandler film The Longest Yard. Dane Krager made his acting debut as the character Willis in the television show, Friday Night Lights.

On March 30, 2013, Dane Krager married his girlfriend Ryan Long at a private beach ceremony held on Amelia Island, Florida.
