= Utah League of Cities and Towns =

The Utah League of Cities and Towns (ULCT) was founded in 1907 for the purpose of advocating municipal interests in the state of Utah. ULCT is a non-partisan, inter-local, government cooperative. The League now represents 245 incorporated municipalities in the state. In addition to promoting municipal interests at both the state and federal levels, the ULCT provides information, training, and technical assistance to local officials on municipal issues.
