= Derrick Lewis (American football) =

American football player (born 1975)

No. 89, 86
- Position: Wide receiver

Personal information
- Born: October 30, 1975 (age 51); New Orleans, Louisiana, U.S.

Career information
- College: San Diego State

Career history
- 2002–2003: New Orleans Saints
- 2004: Frankfurt Galaxy
- 2004: Tampa Bay Buccaneers
- 2006: Austin Wranglers
- 2006: Houston Texans
- 2007: Austin Wranglers
- 2008: New Orleans VooDoo
- 2010: Orlando Predators
- 2011: New Orleans VooDoo
- Stats at Pro Football Reference

Derrick Lewis (born October 30, 1975) is an American former professional football player who was a wide receiver in the National Football League (NFL). He played college football for the San Diego State Aztecs.

He was signed as an undrafted free agent in 2002 with the New Orleans Saints and spent two years with the Saints before spending two years with the Tampa Bay Buccaneers. He signed with the Houston Texans as a free agent in 2006. The spring before, Lewis started as an offensive specialist for the Arena Football League's Austin Wranglers. While a Wrangler, Lewis broke the record for single-season receptions, in addition to being considered by many a beneficial component for the Wranglers' first ever playoff berth in franchise history. Lewis played his first year of organized football at Sacramento City College in 1998 and caught 34 passes. He transferred to San Diego State University in 1999.

== See also ==
- List of NCAA major college football yearly receiving leaders
