= Murray City School District =

Public school district in Murray, Utah, United States

Location
- 5102 S. Commerce Drive; Murray, Utah; Salt Lake County United States

District information
- Grades: K-12
- Established: 1906
- Superintendent: Jennifer Covington

Other information
- Website: Official website

The Murray City School District is a school district in Murray, Utah, United States. Although the district was formally established in 1906, the first known school building in the area was built in 1851. It was a small, single-room adobe structure, crudely constructed, and heated with a one small stove.

== History ==
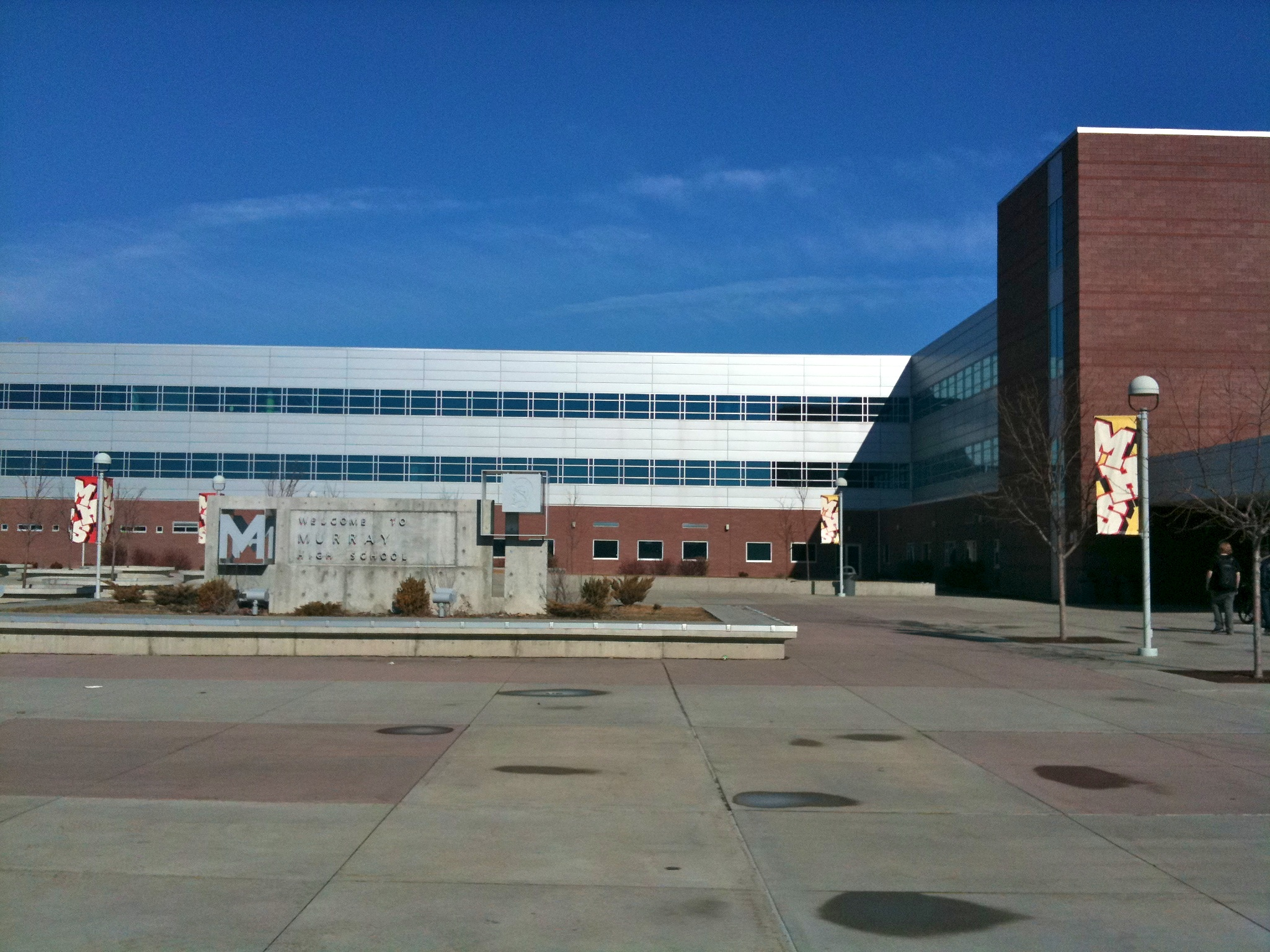
Murray High School

Between 1874 and 1900, three brick schools were built and rebuilt to keep up with the growing population. In 1905, Murray City annexed an area of land that increased the population to 5000. As a result, the city decided it was necessary to have its own school district, which enrolled nearly 1000 pupils in the first year. There was a staff of twenty teachers, and two music and art specialists. A beginning teacher made $45 a month.

The three school buildings in the newly established district were renamed through a student competition in 1906. The names selected were Arlington School (formerly District #25 and Central School), Liberty School (formerly District #24 and Winchester School), and Pioneer School, located near 300 West and 5300 South. By 1911, Bonnyview and Hillcrest Schools had been built. Development of a high-school curriculum began in the 1913–14 school year, at the Hillcrest School. A new grade level was added each year until diplomas were awarded in May 1917, to the first five high-school graduates. Kindergarten was permanently instituted in the 1920s. Between 1950 and 1970, the district experienced rapid growth. Seven schools were built: a new Murray High School facility, Riverview Junior High, and McMillan, Grant, Viewmont, Parkside, and Longview elementary schools. Horizon Elementary School was built in the 1980s, when the old Arlington School was converted into Murray's new city hall.

Creekside High School was an alternative high school for adult students and teenagers that needed help in schooling. The school was closed in the 2006–07 school year, due to dropping student numbers, and the remaining students were transferred to Murray High School.

In 2015, the district moved into a new facility at 5102 S. Commerce Drive in Murray. The new office houses administrative and business offices, maintenance shop, bus garages, and office and information technology.

On March 12, 2020, Murray City School District became the first in Utah to make the move to remote learning as a response to the COVID-19 pandemic, after a student had a close encounter with someone who had tested positive for the virus. The district immediately re-opened to digital learning the following day as the Governor Gary Herbert order all schools closed on March 13, 2020.

MCSD was also one of the first in Utah to re-open in August 2020 following closure implemented in March. The district re-open plan included sanitation, testing, and quarantining protocols to help ensure safety.

== The District Today ==
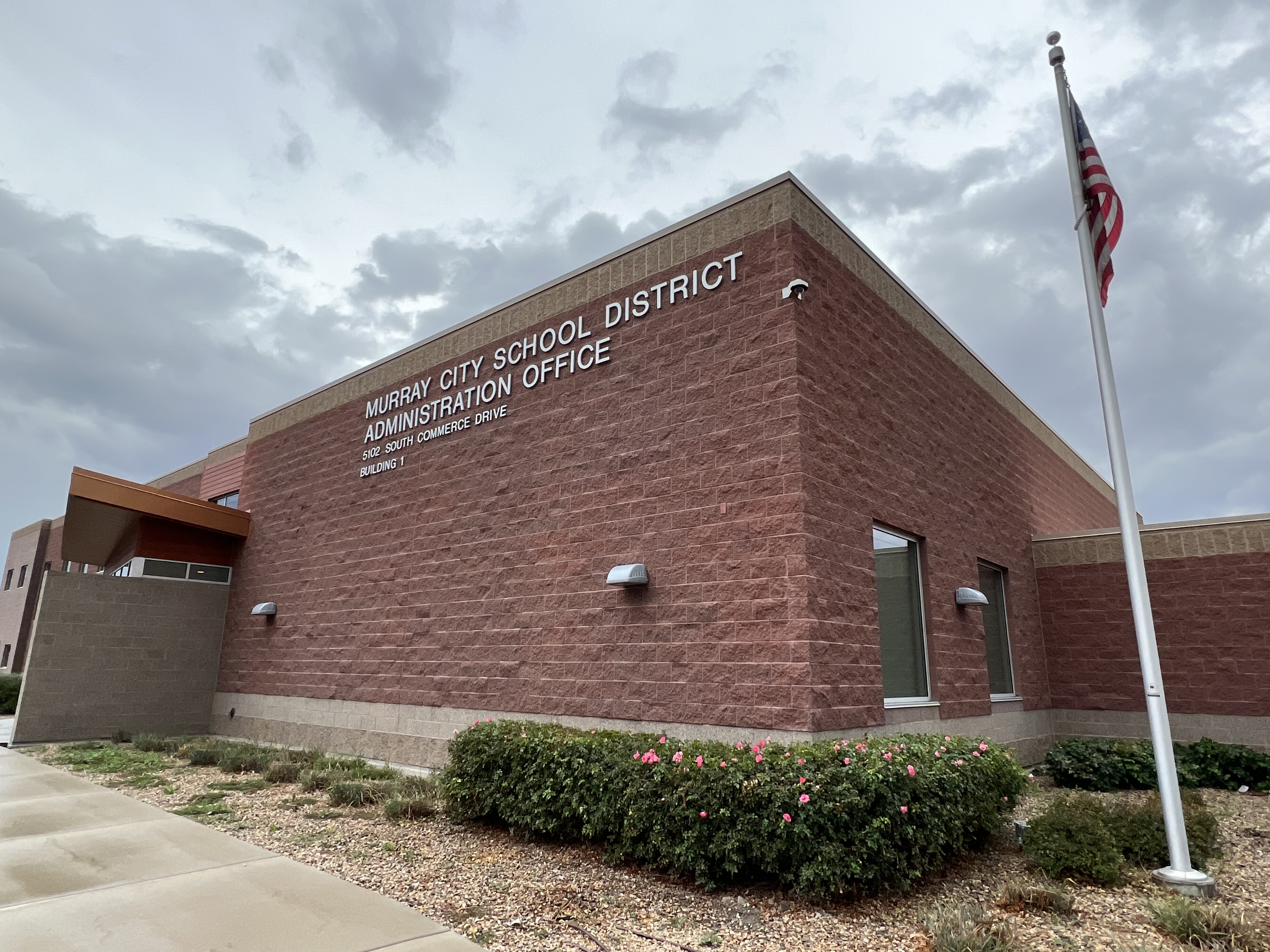
District Office Building, 5102 S. Commerce Drive, Murray

Today, the district has over 6000 students in grades K–12, enrolled in seven elementary schools, two junior highs, and one high school. Murray schools benefit from the PTA, Murray Education Foundation (a nonprofit organization assisting in recognizing excellence in the schools and resources for special school needs), Murray High School Renaissance Program, each school's Community Council, and an adult Community Education program with diverse class offerings.

Murray High, re-opened following a renovation in 2003, and has an enrollment of around 1500 students. The 260,000-square-foot (24,000 m^{2}) school is built on the same 21 acres (85,000 m^{2}) as the previous high school. It is a state-of-the-art facility, with high ceilings and skylights, a commons area, wireless network connections in every classroom (internet access is restricted), a geothermal heating and cooling system, an expanded auditorium, two gyms, and a courtyard.

Hillcrest and Riverview Junior High schools have a combined enrollment of nearly 1500 students. Both schools have many extracurricular activities, including athletics, choir, and band. There is a variety of opportunities for academic enrichment through an interdisciplinary curriculum that focuses on higher-level thinking skills, problem-solving, research, and independent studies.

A new Hillcrest Junior High School was rebuilt and opened at the beginning of the 2015–2016 school year.

The seven elementary schools average around 22 students per classroom. The Kennecott Nature Center of Murray gives students the opportunity to enjoy observing and learning about nature up close and hands on.

=== Schools ===
- Murray High School
- Hillcrest Jr. High School
- Riverview Junior High School
- Grant Elementary School
- Horizon Elementary School
- Liberty Elementary School
- Longview Elementary School
- McMillan Elementary School
- Parkside Elementary School
- Viewmont Elementary School

== District Technology ==
Murray City School District funded one of the state's first 1:1 technology platform program in 2018, where every student was assigned a laptop (largely Chromebooks) they could use in class or take home.

The district's advanced technology planning proved insightful as students and teachers were able to make a fairly smooth transition following the sudden closure due to the COVID-19 pandemic on March 12, 2020.

Murray City School District was recognized nationally in 2021 as the first school district in the nation to build its own private LTE network for students. This connectivity within the school's boundaries allows the district to ensure all students are able to have an internet connection from which to do homework or in times when remote learning is necessary (due to student absence or school closures).

== District-Wide Energy-Saving Program ==
At the beginning of the 2007–2008 school year, district administrators started a program to save energy and money. Murray is the first school district in the Salt Lake Valley to implement such a program. Adjustments were made in district buildings, including changes to thermostats. During weekends and long breaks, copy machines and computers are unplugged, and running water to restrooms is turned off. Students also help by recycling. The extra money saved goes to improve the budgets of school programs.

== Superintendents ==
- Gideon M. Mumford, July 1905 - June 1912
- Carl Ephraim Gaufin, June 1912 - July 28, 1928 (died)
- E. Allen Bateman, 1928 - 1933
- James Clove, 1933–1950
- J. Easton Parratt, August 1, 1950 - 1972
- Richard H. White, July 1 - October 1972
- Glen C. Oldroyd, December 1972 - 1986
- Ronald L. Stephens, 1986 - July 1, 1998
- Richard Tranter, July 1, 1998 - July 1, 2011
- Steven Hirase, July 1, 2011 - July 1, 2017
- Jennifer Covington, July 1, 2017 – present
