= Murray High School (Utah) =

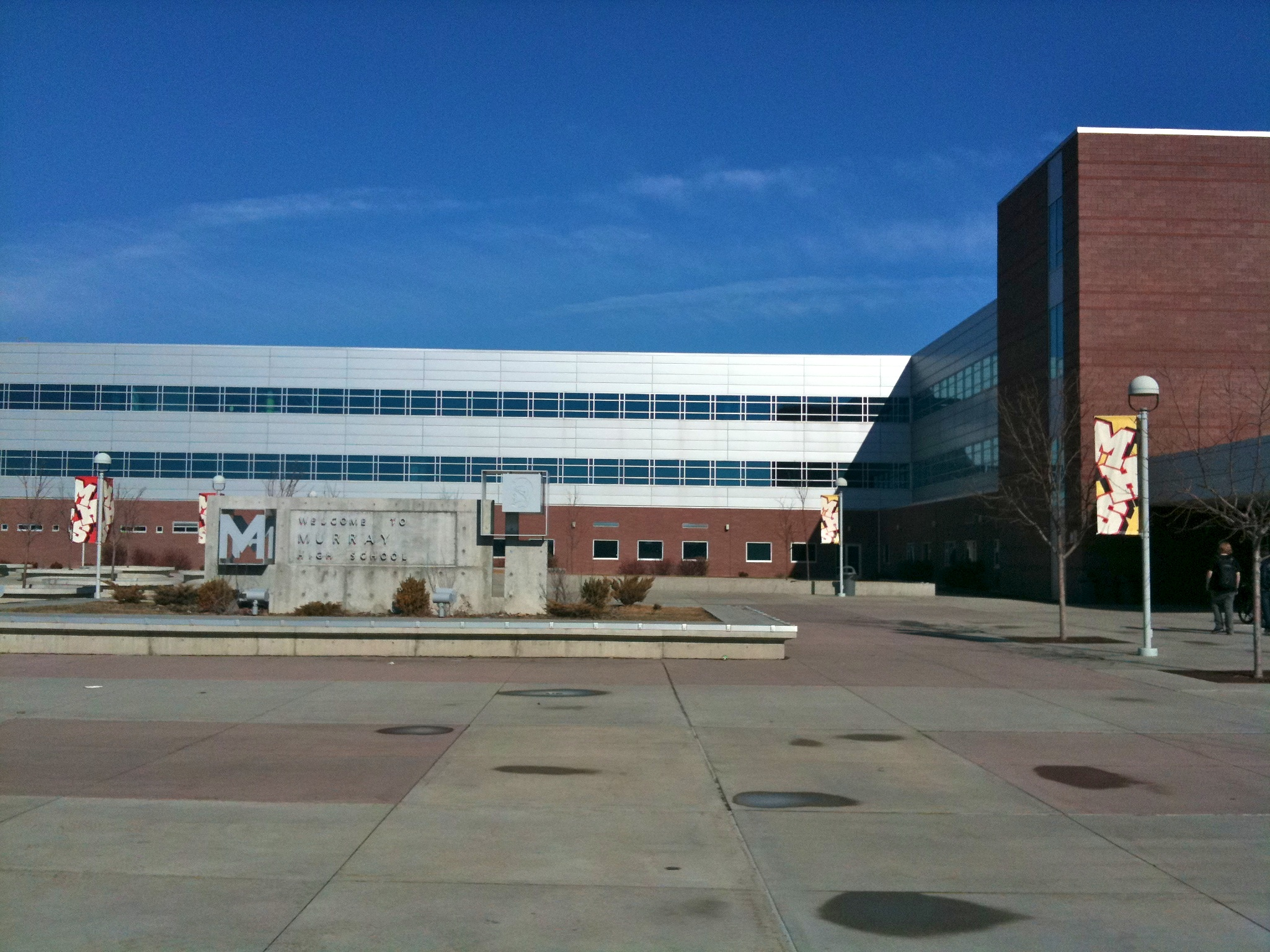
- Murray High School's main entrance and plaza

Location
- 5440 South State Street; Murray, Utah 84107; United States; 40°39′15″N 111°53′21″W

Information
- Type: Public
- Motto: Serve, Participate, Achieve, Respect. SPAR On!
- Established: 1916 (Hillcrest location); 1954 (current location)
- School district: Murray City School District
- Principal: Quinn Linde
- Teaching staff: 63.52 (FTE)
- Grades: 10–12
- Enrollment: 1,374 (2023-2024)
- Student to teacher ratio: 21.63
- Campus size: 21 acres (85,000 m^{2})
- Colors: Orange and black
- Athletics conference: 4-A Region 10
- Mascot: Spartans
- Website: mhs.murrayschools.org

Murray High School is the only high school in the Murray City School District in Murray, Utah. Murray High School is located in the Salt Lake City metropolitan area with 1,465 students enrolled in the 2019–2020 academic year. The school enrolls students in grades 10–12. The school's mascot is the Spartan, and the school colors are orange and black. Murray High is a 4-A school in Utah's 10 Division high school sports leagues (1A being the smallest, and 6A being the largest). The Disney Channel reality show High School Musical: Get in the Picture was shot on the Murray High campus in 2008, and American Idol season 7 runner-up David Archuleta attended the school. The school also offers the highest number of Salt Lake Community College Concurrent Enrollment classes in the state of Utah.

== Building history ==
Murray High School was originally located on the east side of State Street at the current Hillcrest Junior High location, another Murray City School District School, at 126 East 5300 South Murray, UT. From 1916 to 1954, Murray Junior High was named Murray High and Junior High. It was rebuilt and moved across to the west side of State Street in 1954.

== Academics ==
Salt Lake Community College Concurrent Enrollment is a service offered in multiple High School's in Utah, Including Murray High school, in which students can take and earn SLCC credit and also in-state college credit. Murray High ranked #1 in the state for the number of SLCC (Salt Lake Community College) associate degrees earned by high school seniors in 2011.

Murray High School is one of the schools in Utah piloting the Utah State Office of Education U-PASS & criterion-referenced tests (CRTs) online. The school has received $100,000 to purchase new laptops and upgrade current computers. The administration of Spring 2008 criterion-referenced tests (CRTs) through computer-based testing (CBT) was performed through Pearson's assessment systems.

== Environment ==
At the beginning of 2007-2008, administrators and Murray High School's Environmental Club started a program to save energy and money. Adjustments at the school, and other schools and offices in the district, included changes to the thermostats and turning off running water in the restrooms and unplugging machines during weekends and long breaks. This has caused difficulties for the instrumental music programs at Murray High since instruments can sustain harm when temperatures are allowed to drop drastically over long school breaks. Recycling bins have been placed throughout the school. Students are sent to detention if they are found to have wasted excessive amounts of water. Since its beginnings, the district has saved $405,000, all of which went into teachers' budgets. It was projected that the district will have saved one million dollars or a twenty percent savings per month by 2024.

== Controversy ==
In 2004, Murray High School prohibited same-sex students from participating in the promenade of their prom. Press coverage noted the similarity to Aaron Fricke vs. Richard B. Lynch, a landmark case in high school student LGBT rights. Using Fricke as a precedent, the ACLU threatened to sue the high school on behalf of its gay and lesbian students. The high school reversed its policy and allowed a 17-year-old lesbian student to dance with her girlfriend at the prom.

Another recent controversy was when some students passed around "white privilege cards".

== Films and other productions shot at Murray ==
- A few of the scenes from the wrestling movie Take Down (1978) were filmed prior to the rebuilding.
- The auditorium scene of High School Musical (2006)
- Read It and Weep (2006)
- Minutemen (2008)
- High School Musical: Get in the Picture (2008)
- High School Musical 3: Senior Year (2008)
- The school was the host venue for American Idol season 7 runner-up David Archuleta's homecoming television episode

== Sports national titles ==
- Men's Inline Hockey 1998, 2005

== Notable alumni ==
- David Archuleta (class of 2009), runner-up on season 7 of American Idol
- Britton Johnsen, NBA basketball player; Utah's Mr. Basketball 1996–1997; player for the Turkish club Galatasaray Cafe Crown
- Braxton Jones, NFL player for the Chicago Bears
- Mark Koncar, NFL player for the Green Bay Packers (retired)
- Nathaniel Coleman, 3-time National Men's Bouldering champion and Team Petzl professional climbers
