= Sedrick Robinson =

American football player (born 1975)

No. 25, 18
- Positions: Wide receiver, defensive back

Personal information
- Born: May 1, 1975 (age 51); LaGrange, Georgia, U.S.
- Listed height: 5 ft 9 in (1.75 m)
- Listed weight: 175 lb (79 kg)

Career information
- College: Kentucky Wesleyan (1993–1996)
- NFL draft: 1997: undrafted

Career history
- Peoria Pirates (1999–2000); Houston ThunderBears (2001); New Jersey/Las Vegas Gladiators (2002–2003); Grand Rapids Rampage (2004)*; Columbus Destroyers (2004–2005); Austin Wranglers (2006–2007); Tampa Bay Storm (2008, 2010)
- * Offseason or practice squad member only

Awards and highlights
- 2× AFL All-Ironman Team (2001, 2004); AFL All-Rookie Team (2001); IFL champion (2000); IFL title game MVP (2000); Division II Offensive Player of the Year (1996); First-team All-American (1996)

Career AFL statistics
- Receiving TDs: 73
- Rushing TDs: 33
- Return TDs: 30
- Passing TDs: 3
- Interception TDs: 2
- Stats at ArenaFan.com

Sedrick Robinson (born May 1, 1975) is an American former professional football wide receiver and defensive back who played nine seasons in the Arena Football League (AFL) with the Houston ThunderBears, New Jersey/Las Vegas Gladiators, Columbus Destroyers, Austin Wranglers, and Tampa Bay Storm. He played college football and baseball at Kentucky Wesleyan College, where he was named the NCAA Division II Offensive Player of the Year as a senior football player in 1996. After a short stint in the Cleveland Indians' minor league system, he played for the Peoria Pirates of the Indoor Football League (IFL) from 1999 to 2000. He helped the Pirates to a record of 17–0 in the 2000 season and was named the MVP of the IFL championship game. Robinson then played in the AFL from 2001 to 2010. He earned AFL All-Ironman Team honors in 2001 and 2004, and AFL All-Rookie Team honors in 2001. He is the AFL's all-time leader in kick return touchdowns.

== Early life and college ==
Sedrick Robinson was born on May 1, 1975, in LaGrange, Georgia. He played college football for the Kentucky Wesleyan Panthers of Kentucky Wesleyan College from 1993 to 1996 as a wide receiver, punt returner, and kick returner. Robinson caught 68 passes for 1,099 yards and 11 touchdowns as a senior in 1996, earning Football Gazette NCAA Division II Offensive Player of the Year honors. He was also named a first-team All-American all-purpose back by American Football Quarterly. He set 22 school records at Kentucky Wesleyan, including most receptions with 191, most receiving yards with 3,328, most all-purpose yards with 5,601, and most total touchdowns with 46. Robinson was invited to the 1997 Snow Bowl, an all-star game for Division II players. He was also invited to the National All-Stars Bowl College Football Classic.

After his college football career, Robinson played two years of college baseball for the Wildcats from 1997 to 1998 as a center fielder. Going into 1997 spring practices, he reportedly could not distinguish between a curveball and a fastball. However, he improved quickly and by April 1997 he was the team's leadoff hitter. Robinson said he joined the baseball team to stay in shape for a chance at pro football.

== Professional career ==
=== Peoria Pirates ===
Robinson went unselected in the 1997 NFL draft. He had workouts with the Albany Firebirds of the Arena Football League (AFL) and the Hamilton Tiger-Cats of the Canadian Football League. In 1998, he signed a minor league baseball deal with the Cleveland Indians. He played for the Peoria Pirates of the Indoor Football League (IFL) from 1999 to 2000. He played in 12 games during the 2000 regular season, catching 42 passes for 592 yards and a team-leading 14 touchdowns while also rushing 32 times for 167 yards and accumulating 1,251 all-purpose yards. He was named the MVP of the Gold Cup championship game after recording four receptions for 98 yards and two touchdowns, and 12 rushing attempts for 103 yards and four touchdowns. The Pirates beat the Bismarck Blaze by a score of 63–42, finishing the season with an overall record of 17–0. The 2000 Pirates were later inducted into the Greater Peoria Sports Hall of Fame.

=== Houston ThunderBears ===
Robinson signed with the Houston ThunderBears of the AFL on December 5, 2000. He was a wide receiver/defensive back during his time in the AFL as the league played under ironman rules. He played in all 14 games for the ThunderBears during his rookie year in 2001, totaling 62 receptions for 807 yards and 14 touchdowns, 28 solo tackles, nine assisted tackles, two forced fumbles, four fumble recoveries, two interceptions for 44 yards and two touchdowns, four pass breakups, four rushes for 33 yards and two touchdowns, and 40 kick returns for 896 yards and three touchdowns. All 14 of Robinson's games were road games as the ThunderBears were a traveling team in 2001. For his performance that year, Robinson was named to both the AFL All-Ironman Team and the AFL All-Rookie Team. He was also the runner-up for the AFL Ironman of the Year award to Dameon Porter. Despite Robinson's strong season, Houston finished the year with a 3–11 record. The ThunderBears folded after the 2001 season.

=== New Jersey/Las Vegas Gladiators ===
In December 2001, Robinson was selected by the New Jersey Gladiators with the second overall pick of the 2002 AFL dispersal draft. He signed with the team on March 23, 2002. On May 18, 2002, against the New York Dragons, Robinson scored six total touchdowns (including three on kick returns) and accrued 328 all-purpose yards in a 76–69 overtime victory. He was named the AFL Offensive Player of the Week for his performance against the Dragons. He played in nine games overall, starting eight, during the 2002 season, totaling 49 catches for 554 yards and six touchdowns, eight solo tackles, five assisted tackles, one sack, one fumble recovery, one interception, one pass breakup, 11 carries for 32 yards and five touchdowns, and 43 kick returns for 973 yards and four touchdowns.

The Gladiators moved to Las Vegas after the 2002 season. Robinson re-signed with the team on January 22, 2003. He started all 16 games for the Las Vegas Gladiators in 2003, accumulating 62 receptions for 611 yards and six touchdowns, 19 solo tackles, ten assisted tackles, one fumble recovery, two interceptions, one pass breakup, and 78 kick returns for 1,743 yards and four touchdowns. Las Vegas finished the season with an 8–8 record and lost in the first round of the playoffs to the Arizona Rattlers.

=== Columbus Destroyers ===
On September 2, 2003, Robinson, Paul LaQuerre, and Hardy Mitchell were traded to the Grand Rapids Rampage for quarterback Clint Dolezel. On October 10, 2003, the Rampage traded Robinson to the Columbus Destroyers for Jeff Loots and Jason Waters. Robinson appeared in all 16 games for the Destroyers in 2004 and recorded career-highs in all three receiving categories with 73 receptions for 1,097 yards and 19 touchdowns. He also posted 12 solo tackles, eight assisted tackles, two pass breakups, 22 rushes for 68 yards and six touchdowns, and 72 kick returns for 1,580 yards and five touchdowns as Columbus went 6–10. He was named to the AFL All-Ironman Team for the second time in his career. Robinson led the team in all-purpose yards, and was second in the league. He was also named team MVP and the AFL Offensive Player of the Month for May 2004.

Robinson was one of four team captains for the Destroyers in 2005. He played in 12 games during the 2005 season, totaling 56 catches for 540 yards and nine touchdowns, 23 solo tackles, nine assisted tackles, one interception, and 33 kick returns for 683 yards and two touchdowns. Columbus finished with a 2–14 record and Robinson became a free agent after the season.

=== Austin Wranglers ===
Robinson signed with the AFL's Austin Wranglers on October 11, 2005. Before the 2006 season, the AFL implemented a rule change to permit free substitution on kickoffs. This resulted in a drop in kickoff return touchdowns in 2006. However, Robinson ended up setting new career-highs in all three returning categories with 83 kick returns for 1,855 yards and seven touchdowns. He also led the league in all three of those stats as well. Robinson was named to the midseason All-AFL team but was not selected to the All-Arena team at the end of the season. Overall in 2006, Robinson appeared in all 16 games, accumulating 28 receptions for 351 yards and seven touchdowns, 24 solo tackles, six assisted tackles, one fumble recovery, and nine rushes for 26 yards and three touchdowns. Austin went 10–6 and lost to the Philadelphia Soul in the Wildcard round by a margin of 52–35.

Robinson was placed on injured reserve on March 30, 2007, and was later activated on May 5, 2007. He played in 11 games overall during the 2007 season, recording 16 catches for 254 yards and three touchdowns, seven solo tackles, ten assisted tackles, 17 rushing attempts for 69 yards and six touchdowns, and 68 kick returns for 1,313 yards and four touchdowns. Robinson finished second in the AFL in all three returning stats in 2007. The Wranglers finished the year with a 4–12 record and folded after the season.

=== Tampa Bay Storm ===
Robinson signed with the Tampa Bay Storm of the AFL on November 13, 2007. He was placed on injured reserve on February 15, 2008, activated on February 23, placed on injured reserve again on March 27, and activated again on April 23, 2008. Overall in 2008, he totaled 44 receptions for 458 yards and five touchdowns, seven solo tackles, two assisted tackles, one forced fumble, two fumble recoveries, and 65 kick returns for 1,170 yards and one touchdown as Tampa Bay finished 8–8. The AFL folded after the 2008 season.

After a one-year hiatus, the AFL returned in 2010. On March 22, 2010, Robinson was assigned to Tampa Bay for the 2010 season. He was placed on injured reserve on April 12, and later activated on May 14, 2010. As a 35-year-old, he caught 32 passes for 440 yards and four touchdowns during the 2010 season while also returning 31 kicks for 537 yards. The Storm went 11–5 and advanced to ArenaBowl XXIII, where they lost to the Spokane Shock by a score of 69–57. Robinson finished his AFL career with totals of 422 receptions for 5,112 yards and 73 touchdowns, 108 rushes for 312 yards and 33 touchdowns, 513 kick returns for 10,750 yards and 30 touchdowns, four completions on eight passing attempts for 67 yards and three touchdowns, 132 solo tackles, 61 assisted tackles, one sack, three forced fumbles, nine fumble recoveries, eight pass breakups, and six interceptions for 139 yards and two touchdowns. Robinson is the AFL's all-time leader in kick return touchdowns. He is also second in kick returns and kick return yards, behind AFL Hall of Famer George LaFrance in both categories. In regards to his return skills, Robinson stated that it is mostly instinct.
