= Austin Wranglers =

Arena football team

Logo

General information
- Founded: 2004
- Folded: 2008
- Headquartered: Frank Erwin Center in Austin, Texas
- Colors: Navy, red, silver, white

Personnel
- Owner: Doug MacGregor

Team history
- Austin Wranglers (2004–2008)

Home fields
- Frank Erwin Center (2004–2008)

League / conference affiliations
- Arena Football League (2004–2007): National Conference (2004–2007); South Div. (2004–2007); af2 (2008): National Conference (2008); Southwestern Div. (2008)

Playoff appearances (2)
- AFL: 2006; af2: 2008

The Austin Wranglers were an arena football team based in Austin, Texas. They played four seasons in the Arena Football League from 2004 to 2007 and spent one season in af2, the AFL's developmental league, in 2008. They made playoff appearances in the AFL in 2006 and in af2 in 2008. They played their home games at the Frank Erwin Center at the University of Texas at Austin.

== History ==
The Wranglers began play in February 2004 as an expansion team in the Arena Football League. They played their home games at the Frank Erwin Center on the University of Texas campus, playing in the Southern Division of the National Conference. The franchise is not to be confused with another Arena Football team called the Oklahoma Wranglers, who played the 2000 and 2001 seasons in Oklahoma City.

In 2004, the Wranglers accumulated an 8–8 record with such notables as quarterback John Kaleo, Charlie Davidson, and Darryl Hammond leading the Wrangler's respectable offensive campaign. The Wranglers however were unable to qualify for the playoffs, after stumbling to 3 losses to close out the season.

The 2004 off-season was relatively quiet; signings included former All-Rookie teamer OL/DL Bryan Henderson, OS Ira Gooch, and QB John Fitzgerald. Departed was former starting quarterback John Kaleo, traded to the Los Avengers for cash and future considerations.

The original mascot for the Austin Wranglers was named Blaze, who was a horse, and in 2005 he was joined by a cowboy - Red Eye (whose eyes glowed red). Due to the expansion team in Utah, the Blaze, the Austin Wranglers changed the name of their mascot to avoid confusion, so the final mascot had a "wilder" appearance than before and went by the name "Trigger".

The training camp which ensued was headlined by the competition between free agent pick up John Fitzgerald, fresh off leading the expansion VooDoo to the playoffs, against 2004 back-up Bobby Pesavento. Pesavento would ultimately defeat Fitzgerald for the starting job though Fitzgerald would take over four games into the season.

John Fitzgerald remained one of the only bright spots on a depleted team, as the Wrangler's finished 2005 with a 6–10 record.

Realizing the past failures in 2004 and 2005, the Wranglers management had an active off-season. Team presidents Doug MacGregor and Glyn Milburn both made important re-signings and signings, including Sedrick Robinson, AFL all-time leading tackler Damon Mason, Donvetis Franklin, Donovan Arp, Derrick Lewis, Chance Mock, and Marcus McKenzie.

On Wednesday, April 26, 2006, Deion Sanders, the multi-talented athlete who retired from playing in the NFL, became one of the franchise's owners.

On May 7, 2006, the Wranglers clinched their first ever playoff berth with a win over the Grand Rapids Rampage. Unfortunately the Wranglers were eliminated from the playoffs after losing to the Philadelphia Soul in the first round of the wild card playoffs.

Shortly after the end of the Wranglers' season, team owner Doug MacGregor announced the firing of Skip Foster, after leading the Wranglers to a franchise best 10–6 season. This shocking move led many to speculate what the Wrangler's intentions were for the future.

After a month full of searching for the future head coach of the Wranglers, Austin announced on June 29, 2006, former offensive coordinator of the Colorado Crush, Brian Partlow, would lead the Wranglers in 2007. During his three seasons as offensive coordinator with the Crush, Partlow established a respected offense in the AFL, in which managed to win one Arena Bowl. Along with this success, Partlow coached offensive specialist Damian Harrell to two consecutive offensive player of the year seasons, while establishing John Dutton, cover boy of EA Sport's Arena Football, as one of the most feared quarterbacks in the league.

On September 15, 2006, the Arena Football League sent shockwaves through its fanbase announcing the implementation of free-substitution, substantially eliminating any remains of the AFL's highly regarded reputation of Ironman football. Previously teams were restricted one substitution per quarter, forcing wide receivers, defensive backs, offensive and defensive linemen to play both sides of the ball. It was highly believed teams would take advantage of this change, in increasing signings of former NFL and NFL Europe players rather than searching for existing talent already in the AFL. A month later in October, the Wranglers quickly proved this theory.

After a relatively quiet opening to the free agency period with the signing of former Georgia Force defensive specialist Nate Coggins, the Wranglers took advantage of the AFL's free-substitution rule, signing of a rather large batch of rookies lacking experience in the arena game including former Texas Longhorn Mike Williams. In addition, the Wranglers signed 2004 AFL Rookie of the Year and former Florida State Seminoles quarterback Adrian McPherson.

Following training camp 2007, the Wranglers roster was set as seven rookies made the cut (nearly a fourth of the team), while Adrian McPherson, Nate Coggins, Anthony Hines, and Chad Dukes were the lone AFL veteran free agent pick ups making the squad. The rest of the roster remained the core nucleus of the Wrangler's playoff run in 2006, including starting defensive specialist Damon Mason and stand out wide receiver Derrick Lewis.

The 2007 season, which would end up being the Wrangler's last in the AFL, served largely as a disappointment. Highly touted free agent pick up Adrian McPherson failed to live up to high expectations and was cut midway through the season, while the defense was among the league's worst, ranking 18th and 17th in defensive passing and receiving respectively. Fans speculate whether the loss of former defensive coordinator Jon Norris may have attributed to the Wrangler's defensive struggles in 2007.

On October 12, 2007, the team announced that they were moving from the AFL to the af2 after much speculation. The ownership had made the decision due to financial difficulties, some rumoring the Wrangler's had lost over $4 million in 2007. In addition the decision was lubricated by the fact Doug MacGregor had purchased four expansion teams in the af2 in 2007, including the Corpus Christi Sharks and the Lubbock Renegades.

A new era of Wrangler's football began on October 22, 2007 with the signing of AFL Hall of Famer Ben Bennett as head coach of the Wranglers. In addition to an impressive resume as quarterback in college and the arena league, Bennett had coached the Florida Firecats to an ArenaCup title in 2004, and had accumulated a 56-33 record with the Manchester Wolves from 2005–2007.

Despite dropping to af2 and considering playing in Cedar Park Entertainment Center to cut costs, success did not follow the Wranglers to af2 while financial difficulties continued to plague the team. Ownership announced in September 2008 that the franchise would cease operations and not appear in 2009.

== Season-by-season ==
League champions	Championship Game Appearance	Division champions	Playoff berth

Season	League	Conference	Division	Regular season			Postseason results
Season	League	Conference	Division	Finish	Wins	Losses	Postseason results
Austin Wranglers
2004	AFL	National	Southern	4th	8	8	
2005	AFL	National	Southern	5th	6	10	
2006	AFL	National	Southern	2nd	10	6	Lost Wild Card Round (Philadelphia) 52–35
2007	AFL	National	Southern	5th	4	12	
2008	AF2	National	Southwestern	2nd	8	8	Lost First Round (Spokane) 42–14
Total					36	44	(includes only regular season)
Total					0	2	(includes only the postseason)
Total					36	46	(includes both regular season and postseason)

== Notable players ==
=== Arena Football Hall of Famers ===
Austin Wranglers Hall of Famers
No.	Name	Year Inducted	Position(s)	Years w/ Wranglers
7	Darryl Hammond	2013	WR/LB	2004

=== Individual awards ===
Kicker of the Year
Season	Player	Position
2007	Mark Lewis	K

=== All-Arena players ===
The following Wranglers players have been named to All-Arena Teams:

- OL/DL Tom Briggs (1)
- K Mark Lewis (1)
- WR/DB John Roberson III (1)

=== All-Ironman players ===
The following Wranglers players have been named to All-Ironman Teams:

- FB/LB Dane Krager

=== All-Rookie players ===
The following Wranglers players have been named to All-Rookie Teams:

- WR/DB Kevin Nickerson
- OL/DL Aaron Humphrey
- DL Rob Schroeder
- OS Tacoma Fontaine
- DS DeRon Jenkins

== Head coaches ==
Name	Term	Regular season				Playoffs		Awards
Name	Term	W	L	T	Win%	W	L	Awards
Skip Foster	2004–2006	24	24	0	.500	0	1	
Brian Partlow	2007	4	12	0	.250	0	0	
Ben Bennett	2008	8	8	0	.500	0	1	

== Radio and television ==
The Wranglers flagship radio station was 1300 The Zone "The Longhorn's Station."

As far as television, all Wrangler games were seen on the af2's online television service af2TV.
