= East Division (AFL) =

East
- Formerly: Eastern Division, as a member of the National Conference
- Conference: American Conference
- League: Arena Football League
- Sport: Arena football
- Founded: 1995
- First season: 1995
- Most recent champion: Philadelphia Soul (4th title)
- Most titles: Albany Firebirds (5 titles)

The East Division was a division of the Arena Football League's American Conference. It was first formed in 1995 as part of the National Conference when expansion led to the creation of divisions.

Since the division's enfranchisement in 1995, as the Eastern Division of the National Conference, the division sent representatives to five ArenaBowls (most recently the Philadelphia Soul in 2013's ArenaBowl XXVI), with two wins (most recently the Philadelphia Soul in 2008's ArenaBowl XXII).

== Division lineups ==
1995–1996

- Albany Firebirds
- Charlotte Rage
- Connecticut Coyotes

Eastern Division in the National Conference. Albany moved in from American Conference. Connecticut Coyotes enfranchised.

1997

- Albany Firebirds (from American Conference)
- Nashville Kats
- New Jersey Red Dogs
- New York Cityhawks

Charlotte and Connecticut folded. Nashville, New Jersey, and New York are enfranchised.

1998

- Albany Firebirds
- New Jersey Red Dogs
- New York Cityhawks

Nashville moved to National Conference's Southern Division.

1999–2000

- Albany Firebirds
- Buffalo Destroyers
- New England Sea Wolves
- New Jersey Red Dogs

Buffalo Destroyers enfranchised. New York moved to Hartford, Connecticut as New England Sea Wolves.

2001

- Buffalo Destroyers
- Carolina Cobras
- New Jersey Gladiators
- New York Dragons
- Toronto Phantoms

As Indiana Firebirds, Albany moved to Indianapolis, Indiana as part of the American Conference's Central Division. Carolina moved in from Southern Division. Iowa Barnstormers moved to Uniondale, New York as New York Dragons. New England moved to Toronto as the Phantoms. New Jersey Red Dogs renamed the Gladiators.

2002

- Buffalo Destroyers
- New Jersey Gladiators
- New York Dragons
- Toronto Phantoms

Carolina moved back to Southern Division.

2003

- Buffalo Destroyers
- Detroit Fury
- Las Vegas Gladiators
- New York Dragons

Detroit moved in from Central Division. New Jersey moved to Las Vegas. Toronto Phantoms folded.

2004

- Carolina Cobras
- Columbus Destroyers
- Dallas Desperados
- New York Dragons
- Philadelphia Soul

Buffalo moved to Columbus, Ohio. Dallas moved in from Central Division. Detroit moved back to Central Division as well. Las Vegas moved to American Conference's Western Division. Philadelphia Soul enfranchised.

2005–2007

- Columbus Destroyers
- Dallas Desperados
- New York Dragons
- Philadelphia Soul

Carolina Cobras folded.

2008

- Cleveland Gladiators
- Columbus Destroyers
- Dallas Desperados
- New York Dragons
- Philadelphia Soul

Las Vegas moved back from Western Division as Cleveland Gladiators. After the 2008 season, Columbus, Dallas, and New York folded while Philadelphia is suspended and the AFL is put on a one-year hiatus. Also, the Cleveland Gladiators joined the Central Division (now part of the National Conference) for the 2010 season when that division was known as the Midwest Division.

2010

- Bossier-Shreveport Battle Wings
- Dallas Vigilantes
- Oklahoma City Yard Dawgz
- Tulsa Talons

The Eastern Division moved to the American Conference as Southwest Division for this season. Dallas Vigilantes enfranchised while the other three teams come from the defunct af2.

2011–2012

- Cleveland Gladiators
- Milwaukee Mustangs
- Philadelphia Soul
- Pittsburgh Power

The Southwest Division changed its name back to Eastern Division. Bossier-Shreveport moved to New Orleans as the VooDoo. Cleveland Gladiators and Milwaukee Iron (renamed Mustangs) moved in from the Central Division (known as Midwest in 2010). Dallas and Tulsa moved to Central Division. Oklahoma City folded. Philadelphia Soul returned. Pittsburgh Power enfranchised.

2013

- Cleveland Gladiators
- Philadelphia Soul
- Pittsburgh Power

Milwaukee Mustangs suspended operations.

2014

- Cleveland Gladiators
- Iowa Barnstormers
- Philadelphia Soul
- Pittsburgh Power

Iowa joined the East Division after the League's expansion into Los Angeles and Portland, and the removal of the Utah Blaze and Chicago Rush.

2015

- Cleveland Gladiators
- New Orleans VooDoo
- Philadelphia Soul

Iowa left to play in the Indoor Football League and Pittsburgh folded because of low attendance.

Due to the reduced number of participating teams, all AFL conferences and divisions were discontinued after the 2015 season.

== Division champions ==
Season	Team	Record	Playoff Results
National Conference
Eastern Division
1995	Albany Firebirds	7–5	Won Quarterfinals (at Stampede) 51–49; Lost Semifinals (at Storm) 49–56
1996	Albany Firebirds	10–4	Won Quarterfinals (Mustangs) 70–58; Lost Semifinals (at Barnstormers) 55–62
1997	Nashville Kats	10–4	Lost Quarterfinals (Storm) 49–52
1998	Albany Firebirds	10–4	Lost Quarterfinals (Red Dogs) 59–66
1999	Albany Firebirds	11–3	Won Quarterfinals (Rampage) 55–45; Won Semifinals (Rattlers) 73–47; Won ArenaBowl XIII (Predators) 59–48
2000	Albany Firebirds	9–5	Lost Quarterfinals (Rattlers) 50–53
2001	Toronto Phantoms	8–6	Won Wild Card Round (Dragons) 64–57; Lost Quarterfinals (at Kats) 38–45
2002	New Jersey Gladiators	9–5	Lost Quarterfinals (Predators) 46–49
2003	New York Dragons	8–8	Won Wild Card Round (Rush) 48–45; Lost Quarterfinals (at Predators) 62–69
2004	New York Dragons†	9–7	Did not qualify
2005	New York Dragons	10–6	Lost NC Semifinals (Predators) 42–47
2006	Dallas Desperados	13–3	Won NC Divisional Playoffs (Force) 62–27; Lost NC Championship (Predators) 28–45
2007	Dallas Desperados	15–1	Lost NC Divisional Playoffs (Destroyers) 59–66
2008	Philadelphia Soul	13–3	Won NC Divisional Playoffs (Dragons) 49–48; Won NC Championship (Gladiators) 70–35; Won ArenaBowl XXII (vs. SaberCats) 59–56
American Conference
Southwest Division
2010	Tulsa Talons	10–6	Lost AC Semifinals (Storm) 38–68
East Division
2011	Cleveland Gladiators	10–8	Lost AC Semifinals (Force) 41–50
2012	Philadelphia Soul	15–3	Won AC Semifinals (VooDoo) 66–53; Won AC Championship (Sharks) 89–34; Lost ArenaBowl XXV (vs. Rattlers) 54–72
2013	Philadelphia Soul	12–6	Won AC Semifinals (Predators) 59–55; Won AC Championship (at Sharks) 75–59; Lost ArenaBowl XXVI (vs. Rattlers) 38–49
2014	Cleveland Gladiators	17–1	Won AC Semifinals (Soul) 39–37; Won AC Championship (Predators) 56–46; Lost ArenaBowl XXVII (Rattlers) 32–72
2015	Philadelphia Soul	15–3	Won AC Semifinals (Gladiators) 47–35; Lost AC Championship (Sharks) 56–61

- † – Despite winning the division in 2004, the New York Dragons failed to qualify for the playoffs.

== Wild Card qualifiers ==
Season	Team	Record	Playoff Results
National Conference
Eastern Division
1997	New Jersey Red Dogs	9-5	Lost Quarterfinals (at Predators) 37–45
1998	New Jersey Red Dogs	8–6	Won Quarterfinals (at Firebirds) 66–59; Lost Semifinals (at Storm) 23–49
2000	New England Sea Wolves	8–6	Lost Wild Card Round (Wranglers) 38–52
2000	Buffalo Destroyers	5–9	Lost Wild Card Round (at Rattlers) 34–41
2001	New York Dragons	8–6	Lost Wild Card Round (at Phantoms) 57–64
2001	Carolina Cobras	7–7	Lost Wild Card Round (at Firebirds) 41–58
2002	Buffalo Destroyers	6–8	Lost Wild Card Round (at Predators) 27–32
2003	Detroit Fury	8–8	Won Wild Card Round (at Rampage) 55–54; Lost Quarterfinals (at Storm) 48–52
2003	Las Vegas Gladiators	8–8	Lost Wild Card Round (at Rattlers) 26–69
2006	New York Dragons	10–6	Lost NC Wild Card Playoffs (Force) 69–72
2006	Philadelphia Soul	9–7	Won NC Wild Card Playoffs (at Wranglers) 52–35; Lost NC Divisional Playoffs (at Predators) 27–31
2007	Philadelphia Soul	8–8	Won NC Wild Card Playoffs (Predators) 41–26; Lost NC Divisional Playoffs (at Force) 39–65
2007	Columbus Destroyers	7–9	Won Wild Card Playoffs (at Storm) 56–55; Won NC Divisional Playoffs (at Desperados) 66–59; Won NC Championship (at Force) 66–56; Lost ArenaBowl XXI (vs. SaberCats) 33–55
2008	Dallas Desperados	12-4	Lost NC Wild Card Playoffs (Dragons) 63–77
2008	Cleveland Gladiators	9–7	Won NC Wild Card Playoffs (Predators) 69–66; Won NC Divisional Playoffs (at Force) 73–70; Lost NC Championship (at Soul) 35–70
2008	New York Dragons	8–8	Won Wild Card Playoffs (at Desperados) 77–63; Lost NC Divisional Playoffs (at Soul) 48–49
American Conference
2014	Pittsburgh Power	15–3	Lost AC Semifinals (at Predators) 48–56
2014	Philadelphia Soul	9–9	Lost AC Semifinals (at Gladiators) 37–39
2015	Cleveland Gladiators	8–10	Lost AC Semifinals (at Soul) 35–47

== Season results ==
Denotes team that won the ArenaBowl
Denotes team that won a Conference Championship, but lost ArenaBowl
Denotes team that qualified for the Playoffs

Season	Team (record)				
Season	1st	2nd	3rd	4th	5th
1995: Eastern Division in the National Conference. Albany Firebirds joined from the American Conference. Connecticut Coyotes enfranchised.
1995	Albany (7–5)	Charlotte (5–7)	Connecticut (1–11)		
1996	Albany (10–4)	Charlotte (5–9)	Connecticut (2–12)		
1997: Charlotte Rage and Connecticut folded. Nashville Kats, New Jersey Red Dogs and New York CityHawks are enfranchised.
1997	Nashville (10–4)	New Jersey (9–5)	Albany (6–8)	New York (2–12)	
1998: Nashville left to join the Southern Division.
1998	Albany (10–4)	New Jersey (8–6)	New York (3–11)		
1999: Buffalo Destroyers enfranchised. New York relocated and became the New England Sea Wolves.
1999	Albany (10–4)	New Jersey (6–8)	New England (5–9)	Buffalo (1–13)	
2000	Albany (9–5)	New England (8–6)	Buffalo (5–9)	New Jersey (4–10)	
2001: Albany, who relocated and became the Indiana Firebirds, left to join the American Conference's Central Division. Carolina Cobras joined from the Southern Division. Iowa Barnstormers, who relocated and became the New York Dragons, joined from the Central Division. New England relocated and became the Toronto Phantoms. New Jersey Red Dogs were renamed the New Jersey Gladiators.
2001	Toronto (8–6)	New York (8–6)	Carolina (7–7)	Buffalo (6–8)	New Jersey (2–12)
2002: Carolina left to rejoin the Southern Division.
2002	New Jersey (9–5)	Buffalo (6–8)	Toronto (5–9)	New York (3–11)	
2003: Detroit Fury joined from the Central Division. New Jersey relocated and became the Las Vegas Gladiators. Toronto folded.
2003	New York (8–8)	Detroit (8–8)	Las Vegas (8–8)	Buffalo (5–11)	
2004: Buffalo relocated and became the Columbus Destroyers. Dallas Desperados joined from the Central Division. Detroit left to rejoin the Central Division. Las Vegas left to join the American Conference's Western Division. Philadelphia Soul enfranchised. Carolina rejoined from the Southern Division.
2004	New York (9–7)	Carolina (6–10)	Dallas (6–10)	Columbus (6–10)	Philadelphia (5–11)
2005: Carolina folded.
2005	New York (10–6)	Dallas (8–7–1)	Philadelphia (6–10)	Columbus (2–14)	
2006	Dallas (13–3)	New York (10–6)	Philadelphia (9–7)	Columbus (8–8)	
2007	Dallas (15–1)	Philadelphia (8–8)	Columbus (7–9)	New York (5–11)	
2008: Las Vegas, who relocated and became the Cleveland Gladiators, rejoined from the American Conference's Western Division. After the 2008 season, Columbus, Dallas, and New York folded while Philadelphia is suspended and the AFL is put on a one-year hiatus. Also, Cleveland joined the Central Division (now part of the National Conference) for the 2010 season when that division was known as the Midwest Division.
2008	Philadelphia (13–3)	Dallas (12–4)	Cleveland (9–7)	New York (8–8)	Columbus (3–13)
2010: The Eastern Division moved to the American Conference as Southwest Division for this season. Dallas Vigilantes enfranchised while Bossier-Shreveport Battle Wings, Oklahoma City Yard Dawgz and Tulsa Talons come from the defunct af2.
2010	Tulsa (10–6)	Oklahoma City (6–10)	Dallas (3–13)	Bossier–Shreveport (3–13)	
2011: The Southwest Division changed its name back to Eastern Division. Bossier-Shreveport who relocated and became the New Orleans VooDoo, left to join the Southern Division. Cleveland rejoined from the National Conference's Central Division (known as Midwest in 2010). Milwaukee Iron, who were renamed the Milwaukee Mustangs, also joined from the Central Division. Dallas and Tulsa left to join the Central Division. Oklahoma City folded. Philadelphia Soul returned. Pittsburgh Power enfranchised.
2011	Cleveland (10–8)	Pittsburgh (9–9)	Milwaukee (7–11)	Philadelphia (6–12)	
2012	Philadelphia (15–3)	Cleveland (8–10)	Milwaukee (5–13)	Pittsburgh (5–13)	
2013: Milwaukee suspended operations.
2013	Philadelphia (12–6)	Cleveland (4–14)	Pittsburgh (4–14)		
2014: Iowa joined from the National Conference's Central Division.
2014	Cleveland (17–1)	Pittsburgh (15–3)	Philadelphia (9–9)	Iowa (6–12)	
2015: Iowa left to play in the IFL and Pittsburgh folded because of low attendance. New Orleans rejoined from the Southern Division.
2015	Philadelphia (15–3)	Cleveland (8–10)	New Orleans (3–14–1)		
