= Jeff Loots =

American gridiron football player (born 1970)

No. 12, 11
- Position: Quarterback

Personal information
- Born: May 19, 1970 (age 56); Saint Paul, Minnesota, U.S.
- Listed height: 6 ft 3 in (1.91 m)
- Listed weight: 205 lb (93 kg)

Career information
- High school: Central (Saint Paul)
- College: Southwest Minnesota State
- NFL draft: 1993: undrafted

Career history
- Toronto Argonauts (1993); Las Vegas Posse (1994)*; Milwaukee Mustangs (1994); Iowa Barnstormers (1995); Florida Bobcats (1996)*; Minnesota Fighting Pike (1996); Arizona Rattlers (1997); Albany Firebirds (1998–1999); Carolina Cobras (2000); Oklahoma Wranglers (2000); Chicago Rush (2001); Oklahoma Wranglers (2001); Buffalo Destroyers (2002–2003); Grand Rapids Rampage (2004)
- * Offseason or practice squad member only

Awards and highlights
- 2× ArenaBowl champion (1997, 1999); First-team NAIA All-American (1992); Second-team NAIA All-American (1991); Second-team AP Little All-American (1992); No. 11 retired by Southwest Minnesota State

Career AFL statistics
- Completions / Attempts: 474 / 814
- Passing yards: 5,873
- TD–INT: 100–34
- Passer rating: 93.98
- Rushing touchdowns: 3
- Stats at ArenaFan.com

Jeff Loots (born May 19, 1970) is an American former professional football quarterback who played nine seasons in the Arena Football League (AFL) with the Milwaukee Mustangs, Minnesota Fighting Pike, Albany Firebirds, Oklahoma Wranglers, Chicago Rush, Buffalo Destroyers, and Grand Rapids Rampage. He played college football at Southwest Minnesota State.

== Early life and college ==
Loots attended Central High School in Saint Paul, Minnesota.

He first played college football at Inver Hills Community College in 1989. He then played for the Western Illinois Leathernecks of Western Illinois University in 1990.

He transferred to play college football for the Southwest Minnesota State Mustangs of Southwest Minnesota State University. Loots finished his career with 703 pass competitions on 1,224 attempts for 10,116 and 102 touchdowns, all of which were school records. He was named first team NAIA All-American in 1992, second team NAIA All-American 1991, honorable mention NAIA All-American in 1990 and second team AP Little All-American in 1992. He recorded 22 wins and five losses as a starter for the Mustangs before he suffered a season ending shoulder injury in week eight of his senior year in 1992. Loots was ranked as the seventh best quarterback in the 1993 NFL draft by Mel Kiper Jr.

He was inducted into the Northern Sun Intercollegiate Conference Hall of Fame in 2009. He was also inducted into the Southwest Minnesota State Mustangs Hall of Honor in 2007. Loots number 11 is retired by the Mustangs.

== Professional career ==
Loots signed with the Toronto Argonauts of the Canadian Football League in 1993 after going undrafted in the 1993 NFL draft. He injured his shoulder and sat out the season. He was traded to the expansion Las Vegas Posse and was the first player to sign with the team. Loots later requested his release. He signed with the expansion Milwaukee Mustangs of the AFL in 1994. The Mustangs finished the season with no wins and twelve losses, with Loots recording eleven touchdown passes.

Loots was drafted by the expansion Iowa Barnstormers of the AFL in 1995. He competed for the starting quarterback job with Kurt Warner before breaking his foot in the Barnstormers' second preseason game. In January 1996, Loots was traded to the Florida Bobcats. He was then traded to the expansion Minnesota Fighting Pike in February 1996. The Fighting Pike finished their only season with four wins and ten losses, with Loots recording seven touchdown passes.

Loots then signed with the AFL's Arizona Rattlers. He was a backup quarterback on the Rattlers in 1997. The Rattlers won ArenaBowl XI against the Iowa Barnstormers on August 25, 1997. In late April 1998, Loots was traded to the Albany Firebirds. He played in 13 games for the Firebirds during the 1998 season but did not record any statistics. He threw seven touchdown passes for Albany in 1999. The Firebirds won ArenaBowl XIII against the Orlando Predators on August 21, 1999. He was traded to the Carolina Cobras in April 2000 but refused to report. He was traded to the Oklahoma Wranglers in May 2000. Loots recorded 14 passing touchdowns as the Wranglers finished the regular season with seven wins and seven losses, losing in the second round of the playoffs to the San Jose SaberCats.

Loots was signed by the expansion Chicago Rush of the AFL to be their starting quarterback in 2001. He recorded 13 passing touchdowns with the Rush. Loots was traded back to the Wranglers during the 2001 season. He recorded 18 passing touchdowns with the Wranglers in 2001. He played from 2002 to 2003 with the AFL's Buffalo Destroyers. Loots recorded 29 passing touchdown during his tenure with the Destroyers. Loots played his final season in 2004 for the Grand Rapids Rampage of the AFL, recording one touchdown pass.

=== Statistics ===
Legend
	Won the ArenaBowl
**Bold**	Career high

Year	Team	Passing							Rushing		
Year	Team	Cmp	Att	Pct	Yds	TD	Int	Rtg	Att	Yds	TD
1994	Milwaukee	73	147	49.7	648	11	7	60.70	3	-23	0
1996	Minnesota	40	75	53.3	484	7	**8**	57.17	3	-2	0
1999	Albany	26	42	61.9	350	7	1	118.06	2	5	**1**
2000	Oklahoma	72	114	**63.2**	966	14	3	109.76	3	**8**	0
2001	Chicago	**50**	**85**	58.8	**628**	**13**	4	100.51	2	**8**	0
2001	Oklahoma	**58**	**92**	63.0	**834**	**18**	1	**127.45**	1	0	0
2002	Buffalo	51	83	61.4	643	10	4	95.61	5	-6	**1**
2003	Buffalo	93	157	59.2	1,233	19	5	101.15	**8**	0	**1**
2004	Grand Rapids	11	19	57.9	87	1	1	60.64	1	0	0
Career		474	814	58.2	5,873	100	34	93.98	28	-10	3
