= 2002 Buffalo Destroyers season =

Arena Football League team season

- Head coach: Ray Bentley
- Home stadium: HSBC Arena

Results
- Record: 6–8
- Division place: 2nd
- Playoffs: Lost 1st round (vs. Predators) 27–32

The 2002 Buffalo Destroyers season was the 4th season for the franchise and the 4th in Buffalo, New York. They finished with a 6–8 record and qualified for the playoffs for the second time in franchise history. The Destroyers lost to the Orlando Predators, 32–27 in the first round.

== Coaching ==
Ray Bentley started his third season as head coach of the Destroyers.

== Preseason schedule ==
Week	Date	Opponent	Home/Away	Result
1	March 30	Detroit Fury	Away	L 27–32
2	April 11	Grand Rapids Rampage	Home	W 51–48

== Regular season schedule ==
Week	Date	Opponent	Home/Away	Result
1	April 19	New Jersey Gladiators	Home	W 53–51
2	April 28	New York Dragons	Away	L 54–69
3	May 4	Detroit Fury	Away	L 48–50
4	May 11	Detroit Fury	Home	W 49–21
5	May 18	Toronto Phantoms	Home	W 49–46
6	May 25	Grand Rapids Rampage	Away	L 45–47
7	June 1	San Jose SaberCats	Home	L 35–63
8	June 8	New York Dragons	Home	W 40–35
9	June 13	Toronto Phantoms	Away	W 55–27
10	June 23	New Jersey Gladiators	Away	W 52–45
11	June 28	Arizona Rattlers	Home	L 42–69
12	July 6	Georgia Force	Away	L 33–54
13	July 12	Carolina Cobras	Home	L 31–52
14	July 20	Los Angeles Avengers	Away	L 41–46

== Playoff schedule ==
Round	Date	Opponent	Home/Away	Result
1st	July 26	(7) Orlando Predators	Away	L 27–32
