= 2001 Buffalo Destroyers season =

Arena Football League team season

- Head coach: Ray Bentley
- Home stadium: HSBC Arena

Results
- Record: 6–8
- Division place: 4th
- Playoffs: did not qualify

The 2001 Buffalo Destroyers season was the 3rd season for the franchise and the 3rd in Buffalo, New York. They finished with a 6–8 record and failed to qualify for the playoffs.

== Coaching ==
Ray Bentley started his second season as head coach of the Destroyers.

== Preseason schedule ==
Week	Date	Opponent	Home/Away	Result
1	March 26	Tampa Bay Storm	Home	L 27–49
2	April 7	Oklahoma Wranglers	Away	L 41–49

== Regular season schedule ==
Week	Date	Opponent	Home/Away	Result
1	April 14	Toronto Phantoms	Away	W 61–54
2	April 20	New Jersey Gladiators	Home	W 39–28
3	April 27	New York Dragons	Away	L 58–70
4	May 4	Carolina Cobras	Away	L 57–59
5	May 11	Florida Bobcats	Home	W 56–48
6	May 18	Houston Thunderbears	Home	W 57–55
7	May 26	Arizona Rattlers	Away	L 14–50
8	June 1	New Jersey Gladiators	Away	W 51–31
9	June 8	New York Dragons	Home	W 58–51
10	June 17	Carolina Cobras	Home	L 44–53
11	June 22	Nashville Kats	Away	L 48–87
12		Bye Week		
13	July 6	Toronto Phantoms	Home	L 26–61
14	July 13	Orlando Predators	Away	L 40–48
15	July 20	Grand Rapids Rampage	Home	L 40–44
