= 2001 Toronto Phantoms season =

Arena Football League team season

- Head coach: Mark Stoute
- Home stadium: Air Canada Centre

Results
- Record: 8–6
- Division place: 1st
- Playoffs: Won Wild Card Playoffs (Dragons) 64–57; Lost Quarterfinals (Kats) 38–45

The 2001 Toronto Phantoms season is the 5th season for the franchise, their first season in Toronto. The Phantoms finished the regular season with an 8–6 record, and beat the New York Dragons in the Wild Card round of the playoffs before falling to the Nashville Kats in the Quarterfinals.

== Standings ==
Eastern Division
Team	Overall			Division		
Team	Wins	Losses	Percentage	Wins	Losses	Percentage
Toronto Phantoms	8	6	.571	7	1	.875
New York Dragons	8	6	.571	4	4	.500
Carolina Cobras	7	7	.500	5	3	.625
Buffalo Destroyers	6	8	.428	4	4	.500
New Jersey Gladiators	2	12	.142	0	8	.000

== Regular season schedule ==
Week	Date	Opponent	Location	Result	Attendance	Record
1	April 14	Buffalo Destroyers	Air Canada Centre	L 54–61	10,023	0–1
2	April 21	@ New York Dragons	Nassau Veterans Memorial Coliseum	W 68–58	11,216	1–1
3	April 27	@ New Jersey Gladiators	Continental Airlines Arena	W 28–25	2,127	2–1
4	May 5	Grand Rapids Rampage	Air Canada Centre	L 45–62	6,503	2–2
5	May 12	@ Tampa Bay Storm	Ice Palace	L 33–70	12,654	2–3
6	May 19	Oklahoma Wranglers	Air Canada Centre	W 72–38	5,183	3–3
7	May 26	@ Florida Bobcats	National Car Rental Center	L 44–51	2,111	3–4
8	June 2	@ Orlando Predators	TD Waterhouse Centre	L 22–70	11,626	3–5
9	June 7	Indiana Firebirds	Air Canada Centre	L 34–45	7,003	3–6
10	Bye					
11	June 23	New York Dragons	Air Canada Centre	W 66–49	6,513	4–6
12	June 30	Carolina Cobras	Air Canada Centre	W 62–56	5,311	5–6
13	July 6	@ Buffalo Destroyers	HSBC Arena	W 61–26	7,925	6–6
14	July 14	New Jersey Gladiators	Air Canada Centre	W 52–45	7,912	7–6
15	July 20	@ Carolina Cobras	Raleigh Entertainment & Sports Arena	W 53–50	13,823	8–6

== Playoff schedule ==
Round	Date	Opponent	Location	Result	Attendance
Wild Card	July 27	New York Dragons	Air Canada Centre	W 64–57	7,377
Quarterfinals	August 3	@ Nashville Kats	Gaylord Entertainment Center	L 38–45	13,722

== Roster ==
2001 Toronto Phantoms roster
Quarterbacks: -- Pat O'Hara; 13 Chad Salisbury; Wide receivers / Defensive Backs: -- Del Lee DB	Offensive linemen: Currently vacant; Defensive linemen: Currently vacant	Fullbacks / Linebackers: Currently vacant; Specialists: -- Damian Harrell OS; -- Anthony Derricks DS; Kickers: -- Matt George	Injured reserve: Currently vacant; Refuse to report: Currently vacant; League Suspension: Currently vacant; Other League Exempt: Currently vacant; Inactive reserve: Currently vacant; Recallable reassignment: Currently vacant; Rookies in italics Roster updated July 12, 2024; 6 Active, 0 Inactive → More rosters
