= 2003 Las Vegas Gladiators season =

Arena Football League team season

- Head coach: Frank Haege
- Home stadium: Thomas & Mack Center

Results
- Record: 8–8
- Division place: 3rd NC Eastern
- Playoffs: L 26–69 to Arizona

The 2003 Las Vegas Gladiators season was the 7th season for the franchise. Before the season started, the Gladiators moved from East Rutherford, New Jersey, to Las Vegas, Nevada. They finished at 8–8, 3rd in the Eastern Division and lost by a score of 69-26 to the Arizona Rattlers in the first round of the playoffs. This was the Gladiators' only playoff appearance in Las Vegas.

== Season schedule ==
Week	Date	Opponent	Result	Record
1	February 2	@ Los Angeles	L 60–48	0–1
2	February 9	@ Arizona	L 46–42	0–2
3	February 17	Tampa Bay	W 61–55 (OT)	1–2
4	February 22	@ New York	W 46–45	2–2
5	March 2	San Jose	L 72–37	2–3
6	March 9	@ Carolina	W 51–41	3–3
7	March 16	Chicago	L 68–48	3–4
8	March 23	@ Buffalo	W 50–32	4–4
9	March 29	Georgia	W 46–41	5–4
10	April 5	Colorado	W 68–34	6–4
11	April 13	@ Grand Rapids	L 69–21	6–5
12	April 20	@ Orlando	L 56–31	6–6
13	April 27	Detroit	W 58–45	7–6
14	May 3	New York	L 43–42	7–7
15	May 11	@ Detroit	L 76–52	7–8
16	May 18	Buffalo	W 55–38	8–8
Wild Card	May 25	@ Arizona	L 69–26	0–1

== Coaching ==
Frank Haege entered his second season as the head coach of the Gladiators.

== Stats ==
=== Offense ===
==== Quarterback ====
Player	Comp.	Att.	Comp%	Yards	TD's	INT's	Long	Rating

==== Running backs ====
Player	Car.	Yards	Avg.	TD's	Long

==== Wide receivers ====
Player	Rec.	Yards	Avg.	TD's	Long

==== Touchdowns ====
Player	TD's	Rush	Rec	Ret	Pts

=== Defense ===
Player	Tackles	Solo	Assisted	Sack	Solo	Assisted	INT	Yards	TD's	Long

=== Special teams ===
==== Kick return ====
Player	Ret	Yards	TD's	Long	Avg	Ret	Yards	TD's	Long	Avg

==== Kicking ====
Player	Extra pt.	Extra pt. Att.	FG	FGA	Long	Pct.	Pts
