= 2002 Toronto Phantoms season =

Arena Football League team season

- Head coach: Mark Stoute
- Home stadium: Air Canada Centre

Results
- Record: 5–9
- Division place: 3rd
- Playoffs: Did not qualify

The 2002 Toronto Phantoms season is the 6th season for the franchise, their second season in Toronto. The Phantoms finished the regular season with a 5–9 record, and missed the playoffs.

== Standings ==
Eastern Division
| Team | Overall | | | Division | | |
| Team | Wins | Losses | Percentage | Wins | Losses | Percentage |
|---|---|---|---|---|---|---|
| New Jersey Gladiators | 9 | 5 | .642 | 4 | 2 | .667 |
| Buffalo Destroyers | 6 | 8 | .428 | 5 | 1 | .833 |
| Toronto Phantoms | 5 | 9 | .357 | 1 | 5 | .167 |
| New York Dragons | 3 | 11 | .214 | 2 | 4 | .333 |

== Regular season schedule ==
| Week | Date | Opponent | Location | Result | Attendance | Record |
|---|---|---|---|---|---|---|
| 1 | April 20 | @ Tampa Bay Storm | Ice Palace | W 51–37 | 12,373 | 1–0 |
| 2 | April 25 | Detroit Fury | Air Canada Centre | W 50–30 | 7,107 | 2–0 |
| 3 | May 4 | @ Arizona Rattlers | America West Arena | L 47–58 | 11,775 | 2–1 |
| 4 | May 9 | Indiana Firebirds | Air Canada Centre | W 45–36 | 7,912 | 3–1 |
| 5 | May 18 | @ Buffalo Destroyers | HSBC Arena | L 46–49 | 8,014 | 3–2 |
| 6 | May 24 | New Jersey Gladiators | Air Canada Centre | L 38–45 | 7,112 | 3–3 |
| 7 | June 1 | @ New York Dragons | Nassau Veterans Memorial Coliseum | W 63–38 | 9,734 | 4–3 |
| 8 | June 9 | @ Georgia Force | Philips Arena | L 22–35 | 5,689 | 4–4 |
| 9 | June 13 | Buffalo Destroyers | Air Canada Centre | L 27–55 | 6,728 | 4–5 |
| 10 | June 21 | @ Orlando Predators | TD Waterhouse Centre | W 47–34 | 12,624 | 5–5 |
| 11 | June 27 | Los Angeles Avengers | Air Canada Centre | L 44–58 | 7,024 | 5–6 |
| 12 | July 4 | Carolina Cobras | Air Canada Centre | L 44–58 | 5,629 | 5–7 |
| 13 | July 13 | @ New Jersey Gladiators | Continental Airlines Arena | L 55–57 (OT) | 5,650 | 5–8 |
| 14 | July 18 | New York Dragons | Air Canada Centre | L 65–66 (OT) | 7,312 | 5–9 |
