= Delphfrine Lee =

American football player (born 1976)

Grambling State Tigers
- Title: Cornerbacks coach

Personal information
- Born: January 19, 1976 (age 50); New Orleans, Louisiana, U.S.
- Listed height: 5 ft 10 in (1.78 m)
- Listed weight: 187 lb (85 kg)

Career information
- Position: Defensive back (No. 35)
- High school: Edna Karr
- College: McNeese State (1994–1998)
- NFL draft: 1999: undrafted

Career history

Playing
- New York Jets (1999); Toronto Phantoms (2001–2002); Indiana Firebirds (2003); Tampa Bay Storm (2004); Columbus Destroyers (2004)

Coaching
- McNeese State (2004–2006) Assistant coach / defensive backs coach; St. Augustine HS (LA) (2007–2011) Assistant coach / defensive coordinator; Landry-Walker HS (LA) (2012–2013) Defensive backs coach / defensive coordinator; John Ehret HS (LA) (2014) Defensive backs coach / defensive coordinator; Sophie B. Wright HS (LA) (2015) Head coach; John Ehret HS (LA) (2016) Defensive back coach / co-defensive coordinator; John Ehret HS (LA) (2017) Interim head coach; Grambling State (2018–2019) Cornerbacks coach; Southeastern Louisiana (2020–2023) Cornerbacks coach; Grambling State (2024–present) Cornerbacks coach

Career NFL statistics
- Games played: 4
- Stats at Pro Football Reference

Delphrine "Del" L. Lee-Collins (born January 19, 1976) is an American former professional football player who was a defensive back for the New York Jets of the National Football League (NFL) for four games in the 1999 season. He is the cornerbacks coach for the Grambling State Tigers. He played college football for the McNeese State Cowboys.

== Playing career ==
Lee played college football for the McNeese Cowboys from 1994 to 1998, where he played in two Southland Conference Championships.

== Coaching career ==
=== John Ehret HS (LA) (second stint) ===
On August 16, 2017, Lee-Collins was named the interim head coach for John Ehret.

=== Grambling State ===
On March 1, 2018, Lee-Collins was hired as the cornerbacks coach for the Grambling State Tigers.

=== Southeastern Louisiana ===
Prior to the 2020 season, Lee-Collins was hired as the cornerbacks coach for the Southeastern Louisiana Lions.

=== Grambling State (second stint) ===
On February 29, 2024, Lee-Collins returned to Grambling State once again as their cornerbacks coach.

== Personal life ==
Lee-Collins' son, Scrapp played as a defensive back at Southeastern Louisiana.
