= Flint Fleming =

American gridiron football player (born 1965)

No. 90
- Position: Offensive lineman / Defensive lineman

Personal information
- Born: March 17, 1965 (age 61); Madison, Wisconsin, U.S.
- Listed height: 6 ft 3 in (1.91 m)
- Listed weight: 265 lb (120 kg)

Career information
- High school: Edgewood (Madison)
- College: North Dakota State (1983–1987)
- NFL draft: 1988: undrafted

Career history
- Atlanta Falcons (1988)*; Calgary Stampeders (1989); BC Lions (1990)*; Detroit Drive/Massachusetts Marauders (1990–1994); Birmingham Fire (1991)*; Orlando Predators (1995–1996); Tampa Bay Storm (1997); Arizona Rattlers (1997–1998); Milwaukee Mustangs (1999); Buffalo Destroyers (2000); Florida Bobcats (2001); Quad City Steamwheelers (2004)
- * Offseason or practice squad member only

Awards and highlights
- 3× ArenaBowl champion (1990, 1992, 1997); Second-team AFL 15th Anniversary Team (2001); Second-team All-Arena (1991); AFL All-Star (1993); All-ArenaBowl Team (1999); ArenaBowl VI Ironman; 3× NCAA Division II national champion (1983, 1985–1986)

Career AFL statistics
- Tackles: 201
- Sacks: 20.5
- Blocked kicks: 7
- Rushing touchdowns: 4
- Receiving touchdowns: 8
- Stats at ArenaFan.com

Flint E. Fleming (born March 17, 1965) is an American former professional football player who played twelve seasons in the Arena Football League (AFL) with the Detroit Drive/Massachusetts Marauders, Orlando Predators, Tampa Bay Storm, Arizona Rattlers, Milwaukee Mustangs, Buffalo Destroyers, and Florida Bobcats. He lined up at offensive line, defensive line, fullback, linebacker, and tight end during his AFL career. He played college football at North Dakota State University and won three NCAA Division II national championships. He signed with the Atlanta Falcons of the National Football League (NFL) as an undrafted free agent in 1988 but did not play for them. After a one-year stint in the Canadian Football League (CFL), Fleming played in the AFL from 1990 to 2001. He played in six ArenaBowls, winning three, and was named to the AFL's all-time ArenaBowl Team in 1999. In 2001, he was named to the AFL 15th Anniversary Team. After retiring as a player, Fleming was a coach in the AFL and af2 from 2002 to 2006. He temporarily came out of retirement in 2004 to play for the Quad City Steamwheelers of the af2.

== Early life and college ==
Flint E. Fleming was born on March 17, 1965, in Madison, Wisconsin. He played high school football at Edgewood High School of the Sacred Heart in Madison, and earned all-city honors as a senior in 1982. He was also a letterman in basketball in high school.

Fleming was a defensive tackle for the North Dakota State Bison of North Dakota State University from 1983 to 1987. He redshirted as a freshman in 1983 after suffering a knee injury. He was then a four-year starter from 1984 to 1987. He weighed 229 pounds (104 kg) in 1985 and 262 pounds (119 kg) in 1986. After the Bison's 1986 quarterfinal playoff game, Fleming was suspended by the NCAA for using anabolic steroids and missed the rest of the postseason as a result. In 2003, Fleming claimed that in 1986 he had received calls from Nightline and Late Night with David Letterman in regards to the steroid suspension. Fleming also spent some time at linebacker and nose guard his senior year in 1987. The Bison won the NCAA Division II national championship in 1983, 1985, and 1986. Fleming totaled 209 tackles, 18.5 sacks, ten forced fumbles, two fumble recoveries, one interception, and 26 pass breakups during his college career. He graduated from North Dakota State with a double major in business administration and economics.

== Professional career ==
=== NFL and CFL ===
Fleming signed with the Atlanta Falcons of the National Football League (NFL) on April 28, 1988, after going unselected in the 1988 NFL draft. He suffered a neck injury and, on July 28, 1988, he voluntarily left the team. He was the eighth Falcons player to voluntarily leave the team that year.

Fleming was signed to the practice roster of the Calgary Stampeders of the Canadian Football League (CFL) on July 27, 1989. He was later promoted to the active roster and played in six games during the 1989 season, posting 16 tackles and three sacks. He was listed as a defensive end with the Stampeders. On April 18, 1990, Fleming signed with the BC Lions of the CFL. However, he was later released before playing for them.

=== Arena Football League ===
==== Detroit Drive/Massachusetts Marauders ====
Fleming played in all eight games for the Detroit Drive of the Arena Football League (AFL) during the 1990 AFL season, totaling 13 solo tackles, 11 assisted tackles, two sacks, four blocked kicks, one interception, two pass breakups, and two fumble recoveries while also catching two passes for 34 yards and a touchdown. Fleming was an offensive lineman/defensive lineman during his time in the AFL as the league played under ironman rules. He also lined up at fullback, linebacker, and tight end from time to time during his AFL career. On August 11, 1990, the Drive won ArenaBowl IV against the Dallas Texans.

On February 20, 1991, Fleming was selected by the Birmingham Fire of the World League of American Football (WLAF) in the eighth round of the defensive line portion of the 1991 WLAF draft. He was cut by the Fire on March 6, 1991. Fleming appeared in all ten games for the Drive during the 1991 season, accumulating 27 solo tackles, ten assisted tackles, five sacks, two blocked kicks, one forced fumble, three fumble recoveries, and two pass breakups, earning second-team All-Arena honors as an offensive lineman/defensive lineman. At one point during the 1991 season, Fleming was also listed as the team's emergency quarterback, with Fleming stating, "I don't know if they were serious, and thank goodness, I never had to find out." The Drive advanced to ArenaBowl V on August 17, 1991, where they lost to the Tampa Bay Storm.

Fleming played in all ten games for the second consecutive season in 1992, recording 26 solo tackles, nine assisted tackles, six sacks, one blocked kick, and one pass breakup. On August 22, 1992, the Drive won ArenaBowl VI against the Orlando Predators and Fleming was named the Ironman of the Game after posting two solo tackles, one assisted tackle, two sacks, one blocked kick, and one rushing touchdown. After the victory in ArenaBowl VI, The Ann Arbor News reported that Fleming had gone missing with the ArenaBowl trophy.

Fleming appeared in nine of the Drive's 12 games during the 1993 season, totaling ten solo tackles, six assisted tackles, one sack, and one pass breakup while also rushing four times for seven yards and two touchdowns. Fleming and the Drive advanced to the ArenaBowl for the fourth straight season, losing to the Storm on August 21, 1993, in ArenaBowl VII. Fleming was also named to the AFL All-Star Game in 1993.

The Drive became the Massachusetts Marauders in 1994. Fleming played in all 12 games for the Marauders during the 1994 season, accumulating 18 solo tackles, six assisted tackles, two sacks, two pass breakups, and seven receptions for 35 yards. Massachusetts finished the 1994 season with an 8–4 record and lost in the semifinals to the Predators by a score of 51–42.

==== Orlando Predators ====
On September 27, 1994, Fleming, Danny Lockett, and the rights to Amod Field were traded to the Orlando Predators for Jackie Walker, Eric Drakes, and Billy Owens. Predators head coach Perry Moss was Fleming's head coach with the Drive in 1990 and remembered Fleming as a "good player, always dependable". Fleming appeared in eight games for the Predators in 1995, recording 13 solo tackles, three assisted tackles, two sacks, three pass breakups, two fumble recoveries, and 13 carries for 46 yards and a touchdown. He missed the final three weeks of the regular season due to cracked ribs and back spasms but returned in time for the playoffs. After the Predators' victory in the first round of the playoffs, Fleming jokingly stated that his "contract is supposed to guarantee that I play in every ArenaBowl." On September 1, 1995, the Predators lost to the Storm in ArenaBowl IX; Fleming's fifth ArenaBowl appearance through his first six seasons in the league.

Fleming played in four games during the 1996 season, totaling nine solo tackles, one assisted tackle, and one fumble recovery. He missed time that year after damaging his MCL and ankle in the same game. He was released by the Predators in 1997.

==== Tampa Bay Storm ====
Fleming signed with the Tampa Bay Storm in April 1997. Before the start of the 1997 season, Fleming stated that he was ready to play after having fully healed from his MCL injury. However, he also noted that his ankle was still a little tender. He played in seven games for the Storm in 1997, posting 13 solo tackles, three assisted tackles, one forced fumble, one fumble recovery, and two pass breakups while also catching three passes for 32 yards and one touchdown. Fleming requested a trade from the Storm, later stating it "was not fun" playing in Tampa and that he did not "feel respected as a player."

==== Arizona Rattlers ====
In June 1997, he was traded to the Arizona Rattlers for lineman Jim Hoffman. Fleming took a 50% pay cut to play for the Rattlers. He appeared in four games for Arizona during the 1997 season, registering seven solo tackles, five assisted tackles, 0.5 sacks, and two pass breakups. On August 25, 1997, the Rattlers won ArenaBowl XI against the Iowa Barnstormers. The next year, Fleming was placed on injured reserve after breaking his thumb on June 20, 1998, against the Predators. He was activated from injured reserve on July 14. Overall, he appeared in 11 games for the Rattlers during the 1998 season, totaling eight solo tackles, two assisted tackles, three receptions for 37 and three touchdowns, and eight rushes for 19 yards and one touchdown. The Rattlers finished the year with a 10–4 record and lost in the semifinals to the Predators 38–33.

==== Milwaukee Mustangs ====
On March 11, 1999, Fleming was traded to the Milwaukee Mustangs for future considerations. He played in all 14 games for the Mustangs in 1999, recording 13 solo tackles, 19 assisted tackles, one forced fumble, one fumble recovery, and five catches for 72 yards and two touchdowns. The Mustangs began the season with an 0–5 record but then won seven out of their next nine games to finish with a 7–7 record. They lost in the first round of the playoffs to the Iowa Barnstormers by a score of 66–34 Fleming was also named to the AFL's all-time All-ArenaBowl Team in 1999.

==== Buffalo Destroyers ====
He was signed by the AFL's Buffalo Destroyers on April 30, 2000. He appeared in four games during the 2000 season, accumulating four solo tackles and three assisted tackles.

==== Florida Bobcats ====
After skipping training camp to renovate his house, Fleming signed with the Florida Bobcats of the AFL on May 1, 2001. He played in one game for the Bobcats, recording one solo tackle and two carries for no yards, before being waived on May 8, 2001. He retired after having cleared the waiver wire without being claimed by any team. In August 2001, he earned second-team AFL 15th Anniversary Team honors. He played in six ArenaBowls overall during his AFL career, winning three.

=== af2 ===
Fleming was assigned to the Quad City Steamwheelers of the af2, the AFL's minor league, on June 2, 2004. He had also previously played in one minor league football game during the 2003 season as well. In late June 2004, he tried out for an extra part in the football movie The Longest Yard, and survived the initial casting cuts but decided to leave before final selections were made, stating "Between coming down here to play (the last month), and running a residential income property business back home (in Madison), I'm spreading myself too thin already with two jobs, let alone taking on a third." On June 25, against the Arkansas Twisters, Fleming returned a fumble recovery for a touchdown. He variously lined up at center, defensive end, fullback, linebacker, and tight end while with Quad City. Through August 4, 2004, he had seven rushing attempts for 17 yards. Fleming interviewed for the Steamwheelers head coaching job after the season but was not hired.

== Coaching career ==
Fleming was the assistant head coach and defensive coordinator for the Columbus Wardogs of the af2 in 2002. He left the team after the 2002 season to seek AFL assistant coaching and af2 head coaching jobs. However, on October 31, 2002, he was named the new head coach and director of football operations for the Wardogs after former head coach Pete Costanza left to become the head coach of the af2's Albany Conquest. In December 2002, Fleming left the Wardogs again to become the defensive coordinator of the AFL's Carolina Cobras for the 2003 season. On March 25, 2004, it was announced that Fleming would be joining the AFL's Indiana Firebirds for the remainder of the 2004 season, assisting with fullbacks and linebackers. Fleming was the offensive/defensive line coach for the Utah Blaze of the AFL in 2006.

== Personal life ==
In 1996, The Orlando Sentinel stated that Fleming's interests included yachts and riding Harley-Davidson motorcycles. He was also a restaurant manager. He scored in the 92nd percentile on the Law School Admission Test. In 1996, The Arizona Republic credited Fleming with having helped Russian hockey player Sergei Fedorov, who was making over $4 million that year, become one of the highest paid players in the National Hockey League. In 1990, while playing for the Detroit Drive, Fleming befriended Fedorov, who had recently moved to the United States and joined the Detroit Red Wings. They lived in the same apartment building and eventually moved in together. Fleming reportedly told Fedorov, who was only making $300,000 at the time, to fire his agent and hire Mike Barnett. Federov initially wanted to hire Fleming to represent him but Fleming declined. Fleming was also friends with Red Wings player Vladimir Konstantinov and visited him in the hospital after his 1997 limousine crash.
