= 2003 Buffalo Destroyers season =

Arena Football League team season

- Head coach: Ron Selesky
- Home stadium: HSBC Arena

Results
- Record: 5–11
- Division place: 4th
- Playoffs: did not qualify

The 2003 Buffalo Destroyers season was the 5th season for the franchise and the 5th in Buffalo, New York. They finished with a 5–11 record and failed to qualify for the playoffs.

== Coaching ==
Ron Selesky started his first season as head coach of the Destroyers.

== Regular season schedule ==
Week	Date	Opponent	Home/Away	Result
1	February 1	Grand Rapids Rampage	Home	L 36–54
2	February 9	Carolina Cobras	Home	W 44–16
3	February 14	Arizona Rattlers	Home	W 49–45
4	February 22	Georgia Force	Away	W 63–43
5	March 1	Chicago Rush	Home	L 13–40
6	March 8	Tampa Bay Storm	Away	L 27–52
7	March 14	San Jose SaberCats	Away	L 41–58
8	March 23	Las Vegas Gladiators	Home	L 32–50
9	March 30	Detroit Fury	Home	L 14–34
10	April 6	New York Dragons	Away	W 46–39
11	April 11	Orlando Predators	Away	L 23–66
12	April 18	Los Angeles Avengers	Away	L 14–65
13	April 26	Indiana Firebirds	Home	W 36–35
14	May 1	Detroit Fury	Away	L 48–50
15	May 11	New York Dragons	Home	L 30–49
16	May 18	Las Vegas Gladiators	Away	L 38–55
