= Cornelius White (American football) =

American football player (born 1972)

No. 4, 12
- Position: Wide receiver/Linebacker

Personal information
- Born: June 23, 1972 (age 54); Prince George's County, Maryland, U.S.
- Listed height: 6 ft 0 in (1.83 m)
- Listed weight: 200 lb (91 kg)

Career information
- High school: Neshaminy (Langhorne, Pennsylvania)
- College: Virginia Tech (1993–1996)
- NFL draft: 1997: undrafted

Career history
- Albany Firebirds (1998–1999); Carolina Cobras (2000–2001); Chicago Rush (2002); Buffalo/Columbus Destroyers (2003–2005); Chicago Rush (2006); Philadelphia Soul (2006)

Awards and highlights
- 2× ArenaBowl champion (1999, 2006); 2× AFL All-Ironman Team (2000, 2005)
- Stats at ArenaFan.com

Cornelius White (born June 23, 1972) is an American former professional football wide receiver/linebacker who played in the Arena Football League (AFL) for the Albany Firebirds (1998–1999), Carolina Cobras (2000–2001), Chicago Rush (2002, 2006), Buffalo/Columbus Destroyers (2003–2005), and Philadelphia Soul (2006).

== Early life ==
White attended Neshaminy High School in Langhorne, Pennsylvania. He participated in American football, basketball and track athletics. In football, he played quarterback and won an All-League honors and All-State honors.

== College career ==
White played college football at Virginia Tech, finishing his career with 78 receptions for 1,114 yards (an average of 14.28 yards per reception) and seven touchdowns.

== Flag football ==
White also spent time playing recreational flag football in Raleigh, North Carolina, for the Blincos. He was also an integral part of the Turning Point Falcons, who play in the RDU Flag Football League.
