= Arena Football League 15th Anniversary Team =

The Arena Football League 15th Anniversary Team was compiled in 2001 to show the league's best players in its 15-year history.

= AFL Hall of Famer

== First-team ==
Position	Player	Team(s) played for	College
Quarterback	Kurt Warner	Iowa Barnstormers (1995–1997)	Northern Iowa
Fullback/Linebacker	Bob McMillen	Arizona Rattlers (1995–2000); San Jose SaberCats (2001)	Illinois-Benedictine
Wide receiver/Defensive back	Barry Wagner	Orlando Predators (1992–1999); San Jose SaberCats (2000–2001)	Alabama A&M
Wide receiver/Linebacker	Hunkie Cooper	Arizona Rattlers (1993–2001)	UNLV
Offensive Specialist	Eddie Brown	Albany/Indiana Firebirds (1994–2001)	Louisiana Tech
Offensive lineman/Defensive lineman	Webbie Burnett	Orlando Predators (1992–2000); Toronto Phantoms (2001)	Florida
Offensive lineman/Defensive lineman	James Baron	Nashville Kats (1997–2001)	Virginia Tech
Offensive lineman/Defensive lineman	Sam Hernandez	Charlotte Rage (1992); Las Vegas Sting/Anaheim Piranhas (1995–1997); San Jose SaberCats (1998–2001)	Sonoma State
Defensive Specialist	Kenny McEntyre	Orlando Predators (1998–2001)	Kansas State
Defensive Specialist	Derek Stingley	Albany Firebirds (1997–2000); Chicago Rush (2001)	Triton
Kicker	David Cool	Orlando Predators (1998–2001)	Georgia Southern

== Second-team ==
Position	Player	Team(s) played for	College
Quarterback	Jay Gruden	Tampa Bay Storm (1991–1996)	Louisville
Quarterback	Mike Pawlawski	San Jose SaberCats (1995); Miami Hooters (1995); Albany Firebirds (1996–2000)	California
Fullback/Linebacker	Travis Pearson	Tampa Bay Storm (1994); Miami Hooters/Florida Bobcats (1995–2000); Los Angeles Avengers (2001)	Alabama State
Fullback/Linebacker	Andre Bowden	Tampa Bay Storm (1991–2001)	Fayetteville State
Wide receiver/Defensive back	Gary Mullen	Denver Dynamite (1987); Los Angeles Cobras (1988); Detroit Drive (1989–1992); Cincinnati Rockers (1993); Milwaukee Mustangs (1995)	West Virginia
Wide receiver/Linebacker	Stevie Thomas	Tampa Bay Storm (1991–1999); Orlando Predators (2000); New Jersey Gladiators (2001)	Bethune–Cookman
Wide receiver/Linebacker	Gary Compton	Dallas Texans (1992–1993); Fort Worth Cavalry (1994); Milwaukee Mustangs (1995–2001)	East Texas State
Offensive Specialist	Calvin Schexnayder	Arizona Rattlers (1994–2001)	Washington State
Offensive lineman/Defensive lineman	Willie Wyatt	Detroit Drive (1993); Tampa Bay Storm (1995–2001)	Alabama
Offensive lineman/Defensive lineman	Flint Fleming	Detroit Drive/Massachusetts Marauders (1990–1994); Orlando Predators (1995–1996); Tampa Bay Storm (1997); Arizona Rattlers (1997–1998); Milwaukee Mustangs (1999); Buffalo Destroyers (2000); Florida Bobcats (2001)	North Dakota State
Offensive lineman/Defensive lineman	Sylvester Bembery	New England Steamrollers (1988); Albany Firebirds (1990–1993); Tampa Bay Storm (1994–1996)	Central Florida
Defensive Specialist	Cecil Doggette	Detroit Drive (1993); Arizona Rattlers (1995–2001)	West Virginia
Kicker	Luis Zendejas	Arizona Rattlers (1992–1995)	Arizona State
Kicker	Mike Black	Charlotte Rage (1993–1994); Iowa Barnstormers (1995–1997); New York CityHawks (1998); New England Sea Wolves (1999); Buffalo Destroyers (2000); Tampa Bay Storm (2001)	Boise State
