= Charlie Davidson =

American football player (born 1972)

No. 1, 5
- Position: Wide receiver / Defensive back

Personal information
- Born: January 19, 1972 (age 54)
- Listed height: 5 ft 11 in (1.80 m)
- Listed weight: 195 lb (88 kg)

Career information
- College: Mississippi State

Career history
- Orlando Predators (1996); Albany Firebirds (1996–1997); Nashville Kats (1997); New York CityHawks (1998); New England Sea Wolves (1999–2000); Toronto Phantoms (2001–2002); Colorado Crush (2002–2003); Austin Wranglers (2004–2005); Orlando Predators (2006)

Awards and highlights
- Second-team All-Arena (2001)

Career AFL statistics
- Receptions: 451
- Receiving yards: 5,384
- Tackles: 355.5
- Interceptions: 21
- Total TDs: 107
- Stats at ArenaFan.com

Charlie Davidson (born January 19, 1972) is an American former football wide receiver/defensive back who played eleven seasons in the Arena Football League (AFL) with the Orlando Predators, Albany Firebirds, Nashville Kats, New York CityHawks, New England Sea Wolves, Toronto Phantoms, Colorado Crush and Austin Wranglers. He played college football at Mississippi State University.

== Early life ==
Charlie Davidson was born on January 19, 1972. He played college football for the Mississippi State Bulldogs of Mississippi State University from 1991 to 1994. He caught four passes for 58 yards in 1991 while also rushing twice for 17 yards. Davidson recorded four interceptions for 66 yards in 1992 and four interceptions for 80 yards and one touchdown in 1994.

== Professional career ==
Davidson played for the AFL's Orlando Predators in 1996. He played for the Albany Firebirds of the AFL from 1996 to 1997. He played for the Nashville Kats of the AFL in 1997. Davidson played for the AFL's New York CityHawks in 1998. He played for the New England Sea Wolves of the AFL from 1999 to 2000. He played for the AFL's Toronto Phantoms from 2001 to 2002, earning second-team All-Arena honors in 2001. Davidson signed with the Colorado Crush of the AFL on November 20, 2002 and played for the team during the 2003 season. He played for the Austin Wranglers of the AFL from 2004 to 2005. He was signed by the Orlando Predators on March 7, 2006.
