= Juston Wood =

American football player and coach (born 1979)

Arizona State Sun Devils
- Title: Offensive analyst

Personal information
- Born: December 27, 1979 (age 46)
- Listed height: 6 ft 2 in (1.88 m)
- Listed weight: 220 lb (100 kg)

Career information
- Position: Quarterback
- High school: David Douglas (Portland, Oregon)
- College: Portland State (1999–2002)
- NFL draft: 2003: undrafted

Career history

Playing
- Minnesota Vikings (2003)*; Central Valley Coyotes (2004–2005); New York Dragons (2006); Philadelphia Soul (2007); New York Dragons (2008)
- * Offseason or practice squad member only

Coaching
- David Douglas HS (2005–2008) Assistant coach; Cal Poly (2009–2012) Wide receivers coach/special teams coordinator; Cal Poly (2013–2015) Quarterbacks coach/passing game coordinator; Cal Poly (2016) Offensive coordinator/quarterbacks coach; Georgia Southern (2017) Wide receivers coach; Georgia Southern (2018) Quarterbacks coach; Boise State (2019) Offensive quality control; Arizona State (2020–present) Offensive analyst

Awards and highlights
- Second-team All-National Conference (2005); First-team All-Big Sky (2001)

Career AFL statistics
- Comp. / Att.: 140 / 230
- Passing yards: 1,543
- TD–INT: 25–16
- QB rating: 78.95
- Rushing TDs: 7
- Stats at ArenaFan.com

Juston Wood (born December 27, 1979) is an American football coach and former quarterback who is currently an offensive analyst at Arizona State University. He played three seasons in the Arena Football League with the New York Dragons and Philadelphia Soul. He played college football at Portland State. He was also a member of the Minnesota Vikings and Central Valley Coyotes.

== Early life ==
Wood played high school football and was a three-year varsity letter winner at David Douglas High School in Portland, Oregon. He also earned all-conference honors in basketball.

== College career ==
Wood played for the Portland State Vikings of Portland State University from 1999 to 2002. He twice earned ADA Academic All-American honors. He was a first-team All-Big Sky Conference selection at quarterback in 2001 and honorable mention in 2002, serving as team captain both seasons. He recorded career passing totals of 414 completions, 724 incompletions, 37 touchdowns and 5,653 yards. He graduated from Portland State with a bachelor's degree in public health education.

== Professional career ==
He was rated the 14th best quarterback in the 2003 NFL draft by NFLDraftScout.com.

Pre-draft measurables
Height	Weight	40-yard dash	10-yard split	20-yard split	20-yard shuttle	Three-cone drill	Vertical jump	Broad jump	Wonderlic
6 ft 1 in (1.85 m)	207 lb (94 kg)	4.78 s	1.69 s	2.83 s	4.16 s	7.14 s	32 1/2 in (0.83 m)	9 ft 5 in (2.87 m)	30
All values from NFL Combine

Wood signed with the Minnesota Vikings on April 28, 2003. He was released by the Vikings on August 25, 2003.

Wood played for the Central Valley Coyotes of the af2 from 2004 to 2005. He completed 60 of 105 passes for 651 yards and 15 scores in 2004. He earned second-team All-National Conference honors, led af2 in total offense averaging 282.4 yards per game and passed for 4,361 yards and 89 touchdowns in 2005.

Wood joined the New York Dragons on January 14, 2006. He was released by the Dragons October 24, 2006. He was signed by the Philadelphia Soul on November 27, 2006. Wood signed with the New York Dragons on March 7, 2008.

=== AFL statistics ===
Year	Team	Passing							Rushing		
Year	Team	Cmp	Att	Pct	Yds	TD	Int	Rtg	Att	Yds	TD
2006	New York	40	58	69.0	382	5	4	79.81	4	2	2
2007	Philadelphia	84	143	58.7	992	20	9	88.68	13	62	3
2008	New York	16	29	55.2	169	0	3	32.76	3	13	2
Career		140	230	60.9	1,543	25	16	78.95	20	77	7

== Coaching career ==
Wood was an assistant coach at David Douglas High School. He became wide receivers coach of the Cal Poly Mustangs of California Polytechnic State University in 2009. He switched to quarterbacks coach in 2013 and became offensive coordinator of the Mustangs in 2016. In December 2016, he was named the wide receivers coach for the Georgia Southern Eagles of Georgia Southern University.
