= 2004 Philadelphia Soul season =

Arena Football League team season

- Head coach: Michael Trigg
- Home stadium: Wachovia Center & Wachovia Spectrum(alt.)

Results
- Record: 5–11
- Division place: 5th
- Playoffs: Did not qualify

The 2004 Philadelphia Soul season was the inaugural season of the Philadelphia Soul in the Arena Football League. It was a disappointing season for the Soul, finishing with a record of 5–11. They won their first game on February 21 vs. the Columbus Destroyers 56–34.

== Schedule ==
Week	Date	Opponent	Home/Away	Result
1	February 8	New Orleans VooDoo	Home	L 42–34
2	February 15	Dallas Desperados	Away	L 51–47
3	February 21	Columbus Destroyers	Home	W 56–34
4	February 29	Tampa Bay Storm	Away	L 40–37
5	March 7	Chicago Rush	Home	W 53–47
6	March 13	Columbus Destroyers	Away	L 43–41
7	March 21	Colorado Crush	Home	L 40–33
8	March 28	Austin Wranglers	Away	W 65–60
9	April 4	Dallas Desperados	Home	W 47–31
10		Bye	Week	
11	April 17	Carolina Cobras	Away	L 63–59
12	April 24	New York Dragons	Home	W 60–58
13	May 1	Colorado Crush	Away	L 58–40
14	May 8	Las Vegas Gladiators	Home	L 63–35
15	May 15	Carolina Cobras	Home	L 46–43
16	May 22	San Jose SaberCats	Away	L 48–36
17	May 30	New York Dragons	Away	L 69–54
