= 2000 Buffalo Destroyers season =

Arena Football League team season

- Head coach: Dave Whinham (fired Week 4, 0–4 record); Ray Bentley (5–5 record)
- Home stadium: HSBC Arena

Results
- Record: 5–9
- Division place: 3rd
- Playoffs: Lost 1st round (vs. Rattlers) 34–41

The 2000 Buffalo Destroyers season was the 2nd season for the franchise and the 2nd in Buffalo, New York. They finished with a 5–9 record and qualified for the playoffs for the first time in franchise history. The Destroyers lost to the Arizona Rattlers, 41–34 in the first round.

== Coaching ==
Dave Whinham began the season at head coach for the Destroyers, but was fired after starting the season 0–4. Former Buffalo Bills linebacker Ray Bentley was hired to coach the team for the remainder of the season and led the Destroyers to a 5–5 finish and a playoff berth.

== Preseason schedule ==
Week	Date	Opponent	Home/Away	Result
1	March 27	Orlando Predators	Home	L 30–46
2	March 31	Iowa Barnstormers	Away	L 50–53

== Regular season schedule ==
Week	Date	Opponent	Home/Away	Result
1	April 15	Oklahoma Wranglers	Away	L 51–62
2	April 22	Iowa Barnstormers	Home	L 35–56
3	April 29	New England Sea Wolves	Away	L 31–58
4	May 6	New Jersey Red Dogs	Home	L 42–62
5	May 12	Albany Firebirds	Away	L 23–75
6	May 19	San Jose SaberCats	Home	L 35–61
7	May 26	New England Sea Wolves	Home	L 34–37
8	June 2	Nashville Kats	Away	L 28–42
9	June 10	Albany Firebirds	Home	W 51–48 (OT)
10	June 17	Houston Thunderbears	Away	W 55–44
11	June 25	New Jersey Red Dogs	Away	W 79–54
12	June 29	Florida Bobcats	Home	W 36–33 (OT)
13		Bye Week		
14	July 14	Los Angeles Avengers	Home	W 60–52
15	July 22	San Jose SaberCats	Away	L 54–83

== Playoff schedule ==
Round	Date	Opponent	Home/Away	Result
1st	July 27	(5) Arizona Rattlers	Away	L 34–41
