= Ron Selesky =

American football player and coach (born 1965)

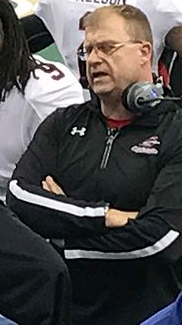
- Selesky with the Cleveland Gladiators in 2017

No. 60
- Position: Center

Personal information
- Born: September 4, 1965 (age 61); New Brunswick, New Jersey, U.S.
- Listed height: 6 ft 1 in (1.85 m)
- Listed weight: 266 lb (121 kg)

Career information
- High school: Chamberlain (Tampa, Florida)
- College: North Central College
- NFL draft: 1987: undrafted

Career history

Playing
- Minnesota Vikings (1987); San Diego Chargers (1988)*; Miami Dolphins (1990)*; Detroit Lions (1992)
- * Offseason or practice squad member only

Coaching
- Tampa Bay Storm (1997–1999) Assistant coach; Carolina Cobras (2000) Line coach; Louisville Fire (2001) Head coach; Albany Conquest (2002) Head coach; Buffalo Destroyers (2003) Head coach; Carolina Cobras (2004) Defensive coordinator / interim head coach; Columbus Destroyers (2005) Defensive coordinator; Alabama Steeldogs (2006–2007) Head coach; Grand Rapids Rampage (2008) Defensive coordinator; Hewitt-Trussville Middle School (2009) Head coach; Cleveland Gladiators (2012–2014) Assistant head coach; Cleveland Gladiators (2016) Assistant head coach; Cleveland Gladiators (2017) Head coach

Operations
- Tampa Bay Storm (1997–1999) Director of player personnel; Carolina Cobras (2000) Director of player personnel; Buffalo Destroyers (2003) Director of football operations; Grand Rapids Rampage (2008) Director of player personnel; Cleveland Gladiators (2010–2011) Director of player personnel; Saskatchewan Roughriders (2015) U.S. scout; Professional Indoor Football League (2015) Director of football operations; Birmingham Iron (2019) Director of football operations; Tampa Bay Vipers (2020) Football operations manager

Awards and highlights
- af2 Coach of the Year (2002)

Career NFL statistics
- GP / GS: 2 / 0
- Stats at Pro Football Reference

Head coaching record
- Regular season: 33–31 (.516) (af2); 13–23 (.361) (AFL)
- Career: 33–31 (.516) (af2); 13–23 (.361) (AFL)

Ronald R. Selesky Jr. (born September 4, 1965) is an American former professional football center and arena football coach. He played college football at North Central College and was signed as an undrafted free agent by the Minnesota Vikings of the National Football League (NFL). He also served as the Director of Football Operations for the Birmingham Iron of the Alliance of American Football (AAF), and held the same position with the Tampa Bay Vipers of the XFL in 2020 prior to the league folding.

== Playing career ==
Selesky attended George D. Chamberlain High School, graduating in 1983 and then North Central College, where he played on the offensive line. He then signed with the Minnesota Vikings of the National Football League (NFL) as an undrafted free agent in 1987. As a rookie, he appeared in two games. He went to training camp with the San Diego Chargers in 1988, the Miami Dolphins in 1990, and the Detroit Lions in 1992.

== Coaching career ==
Selesky joined the coaching staff of the Tampa Bay Storm of the Arena Football League (AFL) in 1997 as an assistant coach and Director of Player Personnel, a position he held for three seasons. After which, he joined the Carolina Cobras for the 2000 season as the team's Line coach, coaching both the offensive and defensive line due to the AFL's iron man rules, and Director of Player Personnel. In 2001, he was named the head coach of the Louisville Fire of af2, the AFL's developmental league. In 2001, the Fire recorded a record of 6–10, and finished sixth in the National Conference's Midwest Division. In 2002, he joined the Albany Conquest as the team's head coach. For that season, the team recorded a 13–3 record, winning the Northeast Division, and finishing 1–1 in the playoffs. For the season, Selesky was named af2's Coach of the Year.

In 2003, Selesky returned to the Arena Football League, this time as head coach and Director of Player Personnel of the Buffalo Destroyers. For the season, the Destroyers recorded a record of 5–11. In 2004, he returned to the Carolina Cobras as the team's defensive coordinator. He was the team's interim head coach for the final six games of the season, replacing both Eddie Khayat (2–4) and John Gregory (1–3), recording a record of 3–3. In September 2004, Selesky was named the defensive coordinator for the Destroyers (by this point relocated to Columbus) for the 2005 season.

In 2006, Selesky returned to af2, this time as the head coach of the Alabama Steeldogs, a position he held for two seasons, recording a 7–9 record each season. In 2008, he returned to the AFL, as the defensive coordinator and Director of Player Personnel for the Grand Rapids Rampage. In 2009, the AFL suspended operations for one season, during that season he was a teacher and coach at Hewitt-Trussville Middle School.

In 2010, he returned to the Gladiators and spent two seasons as the team's Director of Player Personnel. In 2012, he became the Gladiators assistant head coach, a position he held for three seasons. In 2015, he joined the Saskatchewan Roughriders of the Canadian Football League (CFL) as the team's U.S. scout. In January 2015, he was named the Director of Football Operations and Compliance for the Professional Indoor Football League. In 2016, he rejoined the Gladiators as the team's assistant head coach. In December 2016, he was named the Gladiators head coach.

After the Gladiators suspended operations, Selesky joined the Birmingham Iron of the Alliance of American Football as director of football operations; after the AAF went bankrupt, he joined the Tampa Bay Vipers of the XFL. in a similar position.

=== AFL head coaching record ===
Team	Year	Regular season				Postseason			
Team	Year	Won	Lost	Win %	Finish	Won	Lost	Win %	Result
BUF	2003	5	11	.313	4th in NC East	0	0	.000	
CAR	2004	3	3	.611	2nd in NC East	0	0	.000	
CLE	2017	5	9	.357	3rd in AFL	0	1	.000	Lost to Tampa Bay Storm in Conference finals
Total		13	23	.361		0	1	.000	

== Personal life ==
Selesky is married and he and his wife have four children.
