= Tom Luginbill =

American football player, coach, and analyst

Profile
- Position: Quarterback

Personal information
- Born: January 3, 1974 (age 52)
- Listed height: 6 ft 1 in (1.85 m)
- Listed weight: 195 lb (88 kg)

Career information
- High school: Torrey Pines (San Diego, California)
- College: Palomar JC (1992–1993); Georgia Tech (1994); Eastern Kentucky (1995)
- NFL draft: 1996: undrafted

Career history

Playing
- Texas Terror (1996); Florida Bobcats (1997)

Coaching
- Amsterdam Admirals (1996–1997) Offensive assistant; New York CityHawks (1998) Offensive coordinator/quarterbacks coach; Nashville Kats (1999) Special teams coach; Tennessee Valley Vipers (2000) Head coach; Los Angeles Xtreme (2001) Quarterbacks coach; Dallas Desperados (2002) Offensive coordinator; Detroit Fury (2003) Offensive coordinator; Detroit Fury (2004) Head coach

Career Arena Football League statistics
- TD–INT: 2–1
- Passing yards: 210
- Completion percentage: 40.0%
- Passer rating: 56.71

Head coaching record
- Career: AFL: 5–11 (.313); AF2: 10–6 (.625)
- Stats at ArenaFan.com

Tom Luginbill (born January 3, 1974) is an American former professional football quarterback and coach. He is currently a college football analyst for ESPN.

== Playing career ==
Luginbill was the starting quarterback for three colleges over his four-year career. He had varying degrees of success ranging from a national championship to a one-win season. He played football for Palomar College, a junior college, from 1992 to 1993, where he amassed 21 wins. In 1993, he led Palomar to the National Junior College championship and a perfect 11–0 record, and was named a first-team All-American by the Junior College Athletic Bureau. Luginbill also set the all-time national junior college record for passing while playing for Palomar, becoming the most highly recruited junior college player in the nation. He still owns numerous team records at Palomar (as of January 26, 2010).

He then transferred to Georgia Tech and won the starting quarterback position in 1994 from Donnie Davis, who had started all 11 games the previous year. In 1994, despite Luginbill turning in performances that would earn him ACC Rookie of the Year honors, the Jackets, purportedly embroiled in controversy over the decision to demote Davis and start Luginbill, would manage to only defeat Division I-AA Western Carolina going 1–10 on the season. With the departure of Bill Lewis and instatement of George O'Leary as the head coach at Georgia Tech, a change in offensive scheme prompted Luginbill to consider another transfer. Luginbill transferred and played his final year at Eastern Kentucky in 1995.

Luginbill went into the Arena Football League and played for the Texas Terror in 1996 and the Florida Bobcats in 1997.

== Coaching career ==
Luginbill's short playing career led him into coaching in four professional football leagues—the XFL, NFL Europe, the Arena Football League, and af2. Luginbill's first coaching job was as a player personnel/coaching assistant with his father for the Amsterdam Admirals in 1996 and 1997. He then joined the AFL's New York CityHawks in 1998 as QB coach and offensive coordinator. Luginbill's first head coaching job was for af2's Tennessee Valley Vipers in 2000 where he was a 25-year-old head coach that lead his team to the ArenaCup championship game in their inaugural season.

When the XFL was formed in 2001, Luginbill again went to work with his father as assistant for the league champion Los Angeles Xtreme. He was the QB coach for league MVP Tommy Maddox prior to Maddox moving back into the National Football League. Luginbill then moved on to the NFL with the Dallas Cowboys and then the AFL's Dallas Desperados as the offensive coordinator and player personnel director. He then got a new head coaching job with the Detroit Fury in 2002 before the franchise folded in 2004. He would finish the season with the Fury before moving on to work for Scouts Inc. as an NFL personnel evaluator which has led to his current role as National Recruiting Director for ESPN's college football recruiting service Scouts Inc. He is also a sideline reporter for ESPN college football games.

== Personal life ==
Luginbill grew up in Tempe, Arizona and San Diego. He is the son of the professional and college coach Al Luginbill.

He has a bachelor's degree in sociology from Eastern Kentucky University and a master's degree from Marshall University.
