= Anthony Derricks =

American football player (born 1976)

No. 6
- Position: Defensive specialist

Personal information
- Born: December 17, 1976 (age 49)
- Listed height: 6 ft 0 in (1.83 m)
- Listed weight: 190 lb (86 kg)

Career information
- College: Mississippi State (1995–1998)
- NFL draft: 1999: undrafted

Career history
- New England Sea Wolves (2000); Birmingham Thunderbolts (2001)*; Toronto Phantoms (2001–2002); Chicago Rush (2003); Colorado Crush (2003); Indiana Firebirds (2004); Tampa Bay Storm (2005); Los Angeles Avengers (2006)
- * Offseason or practice squad member only

Awards and highlights
- AFL All-Rookie Team (2000)
- Stats at ArenaFan.com

Anthony Derricks (born December 17, 1976) is an American former professional football defensive specialist/kickoff returner who played in the Arena Football League. He holds Arena football records for kickoff returns in a game (11), return yards in a game (336) and touchdowns on returns in a game (4). His 25.1 average per return on kickoffs for the 2000 season is also a record. He finished second in the 2000 rookie of the year balloting.

== College career ==
Derricks attended Mississippi State University from 1995 to 1999 and was a four-year letterman in football. His last college game was in the 1999 Cotton Bowl against the University of Texas Longhorns and the Heisman winning running back, Ricky Williams.
