= 1999 Buffalo Destroyers season =

Arena Football League team season

- Head coach: Dave Whinham
- Home stadium: Marine Midland Arena

Results
- Record: 1–13
- Division place: 4th
- Playoffs: did not qualify

The 1999 Buffalo Destroyers season was the 1st season for the franchise and the 1st in Buffalo, New York. They finished with a 1–13 record and failed to qualify for the playoffs. The Destroyers recorded their first win in franchise history on July 23, 1999, when they defeated the Portland Forest Dragons, 30–23.

== Coaching ==
Dave Whinham was the head coach of the Destroyers for their inaugural season.

== Preseason schedule ==
Week	Date	Opponent	Home/Away	Result
1	April 7	Florida Bobcats	Neutral	W 24–17
2	April 16	Orlando Predators	Away	L 34–35

== Regular season schedule ==
Week	Date	Opponent	Home/Away	Result
1	April 30	New England Sea Wolves	Home	L 26–59
2	May 7	New Jersey Red Dogs	Home	L 39–41
3	May 15	Albany Firebirds	Away	L 41–51
4	May 21	New England Sea Wolves	Away	L 22–36
5	May 28	Grand Rapids Rampage	Home	L 38–40
6	June 4	Florida Bobcats	Home	L 32–50
7	June 12	Iowa Barnstormers	Away	L 42–29
8	June 21	Albany Firebirds	Home	L 34–54
9	June 25	New Jersey Red Dogs	Away	L 20–34
10	July 2	Tampa Bay Storm	Home	L 14–59
11	July 9	San Jose SaberCats	Away	L 46–52
12	July 16	Portland Forest Dragons	Away	L 43–46
13	July 23	Portland Forest Dragons	Home	W 30–23
14	July 30	Orlando Predators	Away	L 40–48
