= Mike Black (kicker) =

American football player (born 1969)

No. 2, 3, 1, 4
- Position: Placekicker

Personal information
- Born: July 25, 1969 (age 57)
- Listed height: 5 ft 6 in (1.68 m)
- Listed weight: 145 lb (66 kg)

Career information
- High school: Bellevue (Bellevue, Washington)
- College: Boise State (1988–1991)
- NFL draft: 1992: undrafted

Career history
- Charlotte Rage (1993–1994); Iowa Barnstormers (1995–1997); New York CityHawks (1998); New England Sea Wolves (1999); Orlando Predators (2000)*; Buffalo Destroyers (2000); Tampa Bay Storm (2001–2004); Grand Rapids Rampage (2004)
- * Offseason or practice squad member only

Awards and highlights
- 4× First-team All-Arena (1993, 1995, 1999, 2001); Second-team AFL 15th Anniversary Team (2001); AFL Kicker of the Year (1999); AFL All-Star (1993); Third-team All-American (1991); First-team All-Big Sky (1991)

Career AFL statistics
- Field goals made: 178 / 368
- Extra points made: 719 / 788
- Stats at ArenaFan.com

Mike Black (born July 25, 1969) is an American former professional football player who was a placekicker for twelve seasons in the Arena Football League (AFL) with the Charlotte Rage, Iowa Barnstormers, New York CityHawks, New England Sea Wolves, Buffalo Destroyers, Tampa Bay Storm, and Grand Rapids Rampage. He played college football at Boise State University, where he was a third-team All-American as a senior in 1991. He then played in the AFL from 1993 to 2004, earning All-Arena honors in four different seasons. Black was the AFL Kicker of the Year in 1999. In 2001, he was named to the AFL 15th Anniversary Team. He ended his AFL career as the league's all-time leading scorer for kickers. At 5 feet 6 inches (1.68 m) and 145 pounds (66 kg), he was one of the smallest players in the AFL. Black has worked as a spotter for ESPN since 1998.

== Early life and college ==
Mike Black was born on July 25, 1969. He played high school football at Bellevue High School in Bellevue, Washington, as a placekicker. He also played soccer growing up.

Black was a four-year letterman for the Boise State Broncos of Boise State University from 1988 to 1991. He converted 13 of 19 field goals and 29 of 30 extra points in 1988, 11 of 20 field goals and 28 of 30 extra points in 1989, and 12 of 17 field goals and 39 of 40 extra points in 1990. In the fourth quarter of the 1990 NCAA Division I-AA quarterfinal game against the Middle Tennessee Blue Raiders, Black made a key fake field goal pass conversion that led to a Boise State touchdown and an eventual 20–13 win. He was also a punter while at Boise State, and punted a school-record 94 times for a school-record 3,488 yards in 1990. As a senior in 1991, he made 15 of 19 field goals and 36 of 37 extra points, earning Associated Press third-team Division I-AA All-American and first-team All-Big Sky honors. Black finished his college career as Boise State's all-time leading scorer with 300 points. He graduated with a degree in business management.

== Professional career ==
After his college career, Black moved to Florida to be with his mother. He tried out for the Tampa Bay Storm of the Arena Football League (AFL) in both 1992 and 1993 but was not signed either time. He then attended a tryout camp for the AFL's Charlotte Rage in 1993 and beat out 40 other kickers, narrowing the Rage's choices down to Black and Brian Mitchell. Black was chosen over Mitchell. The team then brought in former Rage kicker Jim Power to compete with Black for the Rage's kicking job, which Black eventually won. After missing both field goals in his Rage debut, he switched to black socks for the next game and converted three of three field goals. However, he was fined $50 for violating the league's dress code. Overall, he played in all 12 games for the Rage during the 1993 season, converting 23 of 40 field goals and 43 of 52 extra points while also making five solo tackles. Black was named first-team All-Arena for his performance during the 1993 season and led the league in kicker scoring with 112 points. He also played in the 1993 AFL All-Star Game. He appeared in all 12 games for the second straight season in 1994, scoring 10 of 37 field goals and 51 of 57 extra points. In 1994, he was one of the smallest players in the league at only 5 feet 6 inches (1.68 m) and 145 pounds (66 kg).

In May 1995, before the start of the season, Black was traded to the Iowa Barnstormers for future considerations. He was roommates with future Pro Football Hall of Famer Kurt Warner while with the Barnstormers. Black kicked a 34-yard game winning field goal in his Barnstormers debut. He played in all 12 games for the Barnstormers in 1995, making 16 of 35 field goals and 63 of 72 extra points, and was named first-team All-Arena for the second time in his career. He appeared in all 14 games during the 1996 season, converting 17 of 39 field goals and 79 of 83 extra points while also posting four solo tackles. The Barnstormers finished the year with a 12–2 record and advanced to ArenaBowl X, where they lost to the Tampa Bay Storm by a score of 42–38. Black played in all 14 games for the second consecutive year in 1997, making 13 of 25 field goals and 96 of 106 extra points while leading the AFL in kicker scoring for the second time in his career with 135 points. The Barnstormers finished the season with an 11–3 record and advanced to the ArenaBowl for the second year in a row, this time losing to the Arizona Rattlers in ArenaBowl XI by a score of 55–33.

In February 1998, Black and David Witthun were traded to the New York CityHawks for Kent Wells. Black appeared in all 14 games for New York during the 1998 season, scoring 23 of 46 field goals and 59 of 67 extra points.

Black played in all 14 games for the New England Sea Wolves in 1999, converting 22 of 45 field goals and 75 of 77 extra points. He garnered first-team All-Arena and AFL Kicker of the Year recognition for his performance during the 1999 season. Black wanted to be closer to his home in Tampa, Florida. The Sea Wolves did not want to lose Black but were not willing to fly him in each week. As a result, on March 7, 2000, he was traded to the Orlando Predators for the ninth overall pick in the 2000 AFL expansion draft. However, on March 21, 2000, he was traded to the Buffalo Destroyers for Josh Taves. In regards to the trade to Buffalo, Black later stated "I was definitely let down. I was under the assumption Orlando wanted me to be their kicker." Black commuted by jet from his home in Tampa to play games for the Buffalo Destroyers. Black played in all 14 games for Buffalo during the 2000 season, making 23 of 42 field goals and 70 of 76 extra points. On July 27, 2000, he set an AFL playoff record with a 58-yard field goal.

On December 1, 2000, it was reported that Black had signed a multi-year contract with the Tampa Bay Storm. He appeared in all 14 games for the Storm in 2001, scoring 13 of 22 field goals and 91 of 94 extra points. For his performance during the 2001 season, he was named first-team All-Arena for the fourth time in his career. Black also earned second-team honors on the AFL's 15th Anniversary Team. He was placed on the refused to report list on March 24, 2002, but was activated on April 1 before the start of the preseason. Black played in all regular season games for the 10th straight year in 2002, recording 15 of 27 field goals and 61 of 69 extra points. Black tore his ACL during the final game of the 2002 regular season after being blocked into the boards during a kickoff. He was then placed on injured reserve on July 25, 2002, before the start of the playoffs. The Storm signed Pete Elezovic to replace Black for the postseason. After taking time off for his ACL to heal, Black re-signed with the Storm on April 9, 2003, after the team released the ineffective Ian Howfield. Black played in two games for the Storm during the 2003 season, converting two of three field goals and 10 of 11 extra points, before being released himself on April 25. He was reinstated to the team's injured list on May 7 but was released later that month. In late February 2004, Black re-signed with the Storm after the team released Howfield again. Black played in four games during the 2004 season, totaling one of four field goals and 16 of 19 extra points. On March 26, 2004, it was reported that Black had been released after Tampa Bay signed Matt George.

Black signed with the Grand Rapids Rampage of the AFL on April 2, 2004. He appeared in one game for the Rampage, converting zero of three field goals and five of five extra points. On April 10, he was placed on emergency hold because of a "prior commitment". Black was released by the Rampage on April 12, 2004. He ended his AFL career as the league's all-time leading scorer for kickers with 178 field goals and 719 extra points.

== Personal life ==
Black worked a number of different jobs during the AFL offseasons, including valet parking and renting out jet skis. He was the personal kicking coach for Miami Hurricanes kicker Jon Peattie. Since 1998, Black has worked as a spotter for ESPN for NFL and college football games. ESPNFrontRow.com notes that Black is "responsible for spotting the game and being an extra set of eyes and ears in the booth, particularly on special teams plays." Black is listed on Kurt Warner's Pro Football Hall of Fame appreciation page.
