= 2006 Philadelphia Soul season =

Major League Baseball season

- Head coach: Bret Munsey
- Home stadium: Wachovia Center & Wachovia Spectrum(alt.)

Results
- Record: 9–7
- Division place: 3rd
- Playoffs: L 31–27 in Week 1 vs. Orlando

The 2006 Philadelphia Soul season was the third season of the Philadelphia Soul. The Soul finished 9–7 on the season and received their first-ever playoff berth.

== Schedule ==
Week	Date	Opponent	Home/Away	Result
1	January 29	Tampa Bay Storm	Home	W 52–34
2	February 5	Los Angeles Avengers	Home	W 47–33
3	February 11	Orlando Predators	Away	L 47–33
4	February 19	New York Dragons	Home	W 75–59
5	February 26	Colorado Crush	Home	L 48–38
6	March 5	Las Vegas Gladiators	Away	L 67–49
7	March 13	Kansas City Brigade	Away	W 54–24
8	March 18	Columbus Destroyers	Away	L 53–20
9	March 25	Dallas Desperados	Away	W 55–51
10	March 31	Austin Wranglers	Home	L 43–38
11	April 9	Chicago Rush	Home	W 56–55 (OT)
12	April 14	Nashville Kats	Away	W 49–33
13	April 21	Columbus Destroyers	Home	L 46–45
14	April 29	New York Dragons	Away	L 65–58
15	May 6	Dallas Desperados	Home	W 51–48
16	May 13	Georgia Force	Away	W 57–41

== Playoffs ==
Week	Date	Opponent	Home/Away	Result
Wild Card	May 21	Austin Wranglers	Away	W 52–35
Divisional	May 28	Orlando Predators	Away	L 31–27
