= 2006 New York Dragons season =

Arena Football League team season

- Head coach: Weylan Harding
- Home stadium: Nassau Veterans Memorial Coliseum

Results
- Record: 10–6
- Division place: 2nd
- Playoffs: L 72–69 vs. (Georgia)

The 2006 New York Dragons season was the 11th season for the franchise. They looked to make the playoffs again after finishing 2005 with a 10–6 record. They went 10–6 and made the playoffs.

== Schedule ==
Week	Date	Opponent	Home/Away Game	Result
1	January 28	Nashville Kats	Home	L 57–28
2	February 3	Chicago Rush	Away	W 51–47
3	February 11	Utah Blaze	Away	W 84–81
4	February 19	Philadelphia Soul	Away	L 75–59
5	February 26	Orlando Predators	Home	W 55–35
6	March 3	Columbus Destroyers	Home	L 65–54
7	March 12	Austin Wranglers	Away	W 59–56
8	March 18	Tampa Bay Storm	Away	L 60–44
9	March 24	Kansas City Brigade	Home	W 54–48
10	April 1	Grand Rapids Rampage	Home	W 48–24
11	April 9	Dallas Desperados	Home	L 48–26
12	April 14	Columbus Destroyers	Away	W 64–57
13	April 23	Los Angeles Avengers	Away	W 70–61
14	April 29	Philadelphia Soul	Home	W 65–58
15	May 6	Georgia Force	Home	W 47–35
16	May 12	Dallas Desperados	Away	L 82–38

== Playoff Schedule ==
Round	Date	Opponent	Home/Away	Result
1	May 21	(6) Georgia Force	Home	L 72–69
