= Weylan Harding =

American football player and coach (born 1972)

Profile
- Position: Defensive back

Personal information
- Born: January 5, 1972 (age 54); Houston, Texas, U.S.
- Listed height: 5 ft 10 in (1.78 m)
- Listed weight: 180 lb (82 kg)

Career information
- High school: Klein (Spring, Texas)
- College: Iowa State

Career history

Playing
- Iowa Barnstormers (1995–1996); Nashville Kats (1997); Portland Forest Dragons (1999); Buffalo Destroyers (2000)

Coaching
- New York Dragons (2005–2008) Head coach
- Stats at ArenaFan.com

Weylan Harding (born January 5, 1972) is an American former professional football coach and player. He was the head coach of the New York Dragons of the Arena Football League.

== Early life ==
Harding attended Klein High School in Spring, Texas and was a student and a letterman in football. In football, he was an All-Conference selection and an All-Greater Houston selection. He attended Iowa State University, where he played defense on the school's football team. He majored in English.

== Playing career ==
In his playing career, he was a defensive specialist for the Iowa Barnstormers (now the Dragons), the former Nashville Kats (now the Georgia Force), the now-defunct Portland Forest Dragons, and the Buffalo Destroyers (now the Columbus Destroyers). He retired as a player in 2000.

== Coaching career ==
At the start of the 2005 season, Harding's first year leading the Dragons, he was 33 years old, making him the second youngest head coach in the history of the league. He had previously worked in the Buffalo Destroyers organization starting in 2000. After the Destroyers moved to Columbus, Ohio he became the team's defensive coordinator in 2002 and returned in 2004.
