= 2005 Columbus Destroyers season =

- Head coach: Chris Spielman
- Home stadium: Nationwide Arena

Results
- Record: 2–14
- Division place: 4th
- Playoffs: did not qualify

The 2005 Columbus Destroyers season was the 7th season for the franchise and the 2nd in Columbus, Ohio. They finished with a 2–14 record and failed to qualify for the playoffs.

== Coaching ==
Chris Spielman started his first season as head coach of the Destroyers.

== Regular season schedule ==
Week	Date	Opponent	Home/Away	Result
1	January 28	Nashville Kats	Home	L 38–47
2	February 13	Dallas Desperados	Away	L 31–35
3	February 19	Chicago Rush	Home	W 52–39
4	February 27	Grand Rapids Rampage	Away	L 57–66
5	March 6	Georgia Force	Away	L 48–55
6	March 12	Las Vegas Gladiators	Home	L 34–63
7	March 20	Colorado Crush	Away	L 37–52
8	March 26	New York Dragons	Home	L 55–56
9	April 3	Philadelphia Soul	Home	L 45–62
10	April 8	Arizona Rattlers	Away	L 53–70
11	April 16	New Orleans VooDoo	Away	L 28–64
12	April 22	Dallas Desperados	Home	L 33–55
13	April 30	Austin Wranglers	Home	L 55–58
14	May 7	New York Dragons	Away	L 44–56
15	May 15	Philadelphia Soul	Away	W 55–52
16	May 22	Tampa Bay Storm	Home	L 53–78
