= Will Rabatin =

American football player (born 1982)

No. 70
- Position: Offensive lineman

Personal information
- Born: August 26, 1982 (age 44); Louisville, Kentucky, U.S.
- Listed height: 6 ft 2 in (1.88 m)
- Listed weight: 296 lb (134 kg)

Career information
- High school: St. Xavier (Louisville)
- College: Louisville
- NFL draft: 2005: undrafted

Career history

Playing
- Louisville Fire (2006); Columbus Destroyers (2007–2008)

Coaching
- St. Xavier HS (KY) (2007) (assistant)

Awards and highlights
- First-team All-Arena (2008); All-Rookie Team (2007)

Career AFL statistics
- Tackles: 4
- Fumbles recovered: 1
- Stats at ArenaFan.com

Will Rabatin (born August 26, 1982) is an American former professional football offensive lineman who played two seasons with the Columbus Destroyers of the Arena Football League (AFL). He first enrolled at Georgetown College before transferring to the University of Louisville. Rabatin was also a member of the Louisville Fire of the af2.

== Early life ==
Rabatin played high school football at St. Xavier High School in Louisville, Kentucky. He was a three-year letterman in football and wrestling. He was a member of the state championship football teams in 1997 and 1999. Rabatin was also an honorable mention all-state selection by the Courier-Journal as a junior after helping St. Xavier to a 14–1 record and the state title. He compiled a 36–4 record and went undefeated in Kentucky during his senior year when he was the state wrestling champion at 275 pounds. He was inducted into the St. Xavier High School Alumni Hall of Honors.

== College career ==
Rabatin first played college football in 2000 for the Georgetown Tigers. He recorded one tackle team while the Tigers posted a 14–0 record and won the 2000 NAIA National Championship.

Rabatin transferred to play for the Louisville Cardinals from 2001 to 2004. He earned Second Team All-Conference USA honors in 2004.

== Professional career ==
Rabatin played for the Louisville Fire of the af2 in 2006, starting 11 of 12 games and earning All-af2 Second Team honors. He was named the af2's top offensive lineman of all time in 2009. His strong blocking ability at the center position was a key reason behind QB Brett Dietz's stellar rookie season in which he won the league's Rookie of the Year Award.

Rabatin played for the Columbus Destroyers of the Arena Football League from 2007 to 2008, earning First Team All-Arena honors in 2008 and All-Rookie Team recognition in 2007.

== Coaching career ==
Rabatin was an assistant coach for the St. Xavier High School Tigers in 2007.
