= Dwaine Carpenter =

American gridiron football player (born 1976)

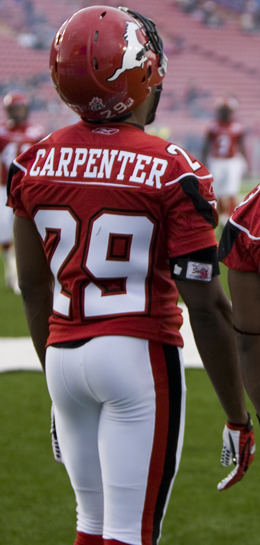
- Carpenter with the Calgary Stampeders in 2007

No. 21, 35, 27, 29, 7
- Position: Safety

Personal information
- Born: November 4, 1976 (age 50); Pinehurst, North Carolina, U.S.
- Listed height: 6 ft 2 in (1.88 m)
- Listed weight: 207 lb (94 kg)

Career information
- College: Elon (1995–1996); North Carolina A&T (1997–1999)
- NFL draft: 2000: undrafted

Career history
- Rochester Brigade (2001); Buffalo Destroyers (2002–2003); San Francisco 49ers (2003–2005); St. Louis Rams (2005–2006); Calgary Stampeders (2007–2009); Toronto Argonauts (2010)*
- * Offseason or practice squad member only

Awards and highlights
- Grey Cup champion (2008); Second-team All-Arena (2003); Black college national champion (1999)
- Stats at Pro Football Reference

Dwaine L. Carpenter (born November 4, 1976) is an American former professional football player. He was signed as a street free agent by the Buffalo Destroyers in 2002. He played college football for the North Carolina A&T Aggies. Carpenter also played at safetyfor the San Francisco 49ers and St. Louis Rams in the National Football League (NFL), and defensive back for the Calgary Stampeders of the Canadian Football League (CFL).

== Professional career ==
=== San Francisco 49ers ===
On May 29, 2003, Carpenter signed with the San Francisco 49ers. Carpenter made his first career start on December 28 when starting free safety Zack Bronson suffered a neck injury. Throughout the 2004 season, Carpenter competed with Ronnie Heard and Keith Lewis for the final starting safety job with the 49ers. But after suffering a knee injury, Carpenter lost out on the competition. However, after Jimmy Williams and Shawntae Spencer went down with injuries, Carpenter was named one of two starting cornerbacks on November 21. He remained the starter for the rest of the season before going down with a back injury in week 16. In 2005, his third with the 49ers, Carpenter was named the starting free safety. On August 20, 2005, the 49ers dealt with the loss of offensive guard Thomas Herrion, Carpenter was one of the only 49ers to speak right after the death saying:

It looked like a seizure, but he didn't move at all anymore. He was just laying there.

After suffering from thigh and foot injuries during training camp, Carpenter was released on September 19. Over his 2 1/2 seasons with the 49ers, Carpenter tallied 82 tackles and one interception.

=== St. Louis Rams ===
Two months after receiving a workout from the Carolina Panthers on October 25, 2005, Carpenter was signed by the St. Louis Rams on December 28, 2005. In St. Louis, Carpenter received little playing time only appearing in 10 games and recording six tackles.

=== Calgary Stampeders ===
Carpenter signed with the Calgary Stampeders on July 13, 2007. He played his first game with Calgary, against Toronto on July 21. His first CFL tackle came on Kamau Peterson on August 8. He had a career high six tackles, in three different games. In the 2007 CFL West semifinal game, Carpenter intercepted quarterback Kerry Joseph for his first interception in the CFL.

In 2008, Carpenter appeared in all eighteen games and made 12 starts at outside linebacker. Carpenter had 35 tackles, with 17 coming on special teams. His first career CFL sack, came against Toronto on September 30. In the Grey Cup game against the Montreal Alouettes, Carpenter had four tackles.

After the 2008 season, Carpenter became a free agent but was re-signed on April 20.

Carpenter was released on May 14, 2010.

=== Toronto Argonauts ===
On May 26, 2010, Carpenter signed with the Toronto Argonauts of the Canadian Football League. He was later released by the team on June 17, 2010. Carpenter was re-signed on July 5, 2010, when it was believed that safety/linebacker Willie Pile would be out of action with a knuckle injury. However, when Pile was re-diagnosed as being medically cleared to play without missing any games, Carpenter was released the following day by the Argonauts.
