= Ray Bentley =

American football linebacker, broadcaster, and author (born 1960)

Profile
- Position: Linebacker

Personal information
- Born: November 25, 1960 (age 65); Grand Rapids, Michigan, U.S.
- Listed height: 6 ft 2 in (1.88 m)
- Listed weight: 230 lb (104 kg)

Career information
- High school: Hudsonville (MI)
- College: Central Michigan
- NFL draft: 1983: undrafted

Career history

Playing
- Michigan Panthers (1983–1984); Oakland Invaders (1985); Tampa Bay Buccaneers (1986)*; Buffalo Bills (1986–1991); Cincinnati Bengals (1992)
- * Offseason or practice squad member only

Coaching
- Buffalo Destroyers (2000–2002) Head coach

Operations
- Buffalo Destroyers (2000–2002) General manager

Awards and highlights
- Vern Smith Leadership Award (1982); MAC Defensive Player of the Year (1982)

Head coaching record
- Regular season: 17–21–0 (.447)
- Postseason: 0–2–0 (.000)
- Career: 17–23–0 (.425)
- Stats at Pro Football Reference

Ray Russell Bentley (born November 25, 1960) is an American broadcaster, author, and former professional football player. He played as a linebacker in the National Football League (NFL). He played college football for the Central Michigan Chippewas.

== Biography ==
=== Playing career ===
Bentley's first three years in professional football were spent with the Michigan Panthers and Oakland Invaders of the United States Football League (USFL).

He later joined the Buffalo Bills, and played six seasons with the team, including their first two Super Bowl years in the 1990s. Bentley's career ended with the Cincinnati Bengals in 1992, in which he set the team's franchise record for the longest fumble return touchdown (75 yards).

=== Broadcasting career ===
Bentley worked as part of the NFL on Fox broadcast team for five years from 1997 to 2001, doing both color commentary and play-by-play. He left Fox for a position as head coach and general manager of the Arena Football League's Buffalo Destroyers, and held that position for two years before resigning.

From 2003 to 2006, Bentley was a color commentator alongside play-by-play man Bob Papa on NBC's Arena Football League coverage, and since 2003 has served in that capacity for ESPN. In 2007, Bentley returned to the Buffalo Bills as a play-by-play announcer for their preseason television games, a role he served in until 2014. He is also an advisory member for the revival of the USFL.

From 2009 to 2016 Bentley was a radio personality on 107.3 in Grand Rapids MI. In 2012 he was the linebacker coach for the Grandville Bulldogs. Ray is currently a defensive coordinator for the high school team Byron Center Bulldogs.

=== Author ===
Bentley is the author of a series of children's books about the character of Darby the Dinosaur.
