= ArenaBowl XI =

Annual league championship game

Iowa Barnstormers (2nd)	Arizona Rattlers (1st)
33	55
	1	2	3	4	Total
IOWA	7	6	7	13	33
ARI	3	21	21	10	55
- Date: August 25, 1997
- Stadium: US Airways Center; Phoenix, Arizona
- MVP: Donnie Davis, QB, Arizona: Hunkie Cooper, WR/LB, Arizona (Ironman of the Game)
- Attendance: 17,436
- Winning coach: Danny White
- Losing coach: John Gregory

TV in the United States
- Network: ESPN
- Announcers: Mike Adamle, Mike Golic, Adrian Karsten

ArenaBowl XI was the Arena Football League's eleventh ArenaBowl. The game featured two American Conference teams, the #2 Iowa Barnstormers (11–3) against the #1 Arizona Rattlers (12–2). Iowa was coming from losing ArenaBowl X to the Tampa Bay Storm and were still looking for their first championship title, while Arizona was making its second appearance after winning ArenaBowl VIII against the Orlando Predators three seasons ago. Now, they were trying to acquire their second league title.

== Game summary ==
In the first quarter, the Rattlers slithered first with Kicker Anthony Brenner getting a 19-yard Field Goal, yet the Barnstormers responded with Quarterback Kurt Warner completing a 30-yard touchdown pass to OS Lamont Cooper.

In the second quarter, Arizona lead off the period with FB/LB Bob McMillen getting a one-yard touchdown run, while Iowa kicker Mike Black nailed a 25-yard field goal. The Rattlers would begin to take command with QB Donnie Davis (who was filling in for an injured Sherdrick Bonner) completing a 4-yard touchdown pass to WR/LB Hunkie Cooper, while the Barnstormers' only response was Black kicking a 20-yard field goal. Immediately afterwards, the Rattlers continued striking as Hunkie Cooper would return the kickoff 56 yards for a touchdown to end the half.

In the third quarter, Arizona continued its domination as Davis got a one-yard Quarterback sneak run for a touchdown, while Hunkie Cooper returned an interception 30 yards for a touchdown. Iowa's only response from the period was Warner completing another 30-yard touchdown pass to Lamont Cooper. Afterwards, the Rattlers wrapped up the period with Davis completing a 49-yard touchdown pass to WR/LB Calvin Schexnayder.

In the fourth quarter, the Barnstormers tried to fight back with WR/DB Willis Jacox getting a one-yard touchdown run, yet Arizona wrapped the game up with Davis and Schexnayder hooking up with each other again on a 28-yard touchdown pass, while Brenner would put on the finishing touches with a 44-yard field goal. All that was left of Iowa's attack was Warner completing a nine-yard touchdown pass to WR/LB Leonard Conley.

With the win, the Rattlers got their second Arena Bowl title in franchise history.

== Scoring summary ==
1st Quarter

- ARI – 19-yard FG Brenner
- IOW – Cooper 30-yard pass from Warner (Black kick)

2nd Quarter

- ARI – McMillen 1-yard run (Brenner kick)
- IOW – 25-yard FG Black
- ARI – Cooper 4-yard pass from Davis (Brenner kick)
- IOW – 20-yard FG Black
- ARI – Cooper 56-yard Kickoff Return (Brenner kick)

3rd Quarter

- ARI – Davis 1-yard run (Brenner kick)
- ARI – Cooper 30-yard Interception Return (Brenner kick)
- IOW – Cooper 30-yard pass from Warner (Black kick)
- ARI – Schexnayder 49-yard pass from Davis (Brenner kick)

4th Quarter

- IOW – Jacox 1-yard run (Black kick)
- ARI – Schexnayder 28-yard pass from Davis (Brenner kick)
- ARI – 44-yard FG Brenner
- IOW – Conley 9-yard pass from Warner (Warner pass failed)
