= Detroit Fury =

Arena football team

Logo

General information
- Founded: 2001
- Folded: 2004
- Headquartered: The Palace of Auburn Hills in Auburn Hills, Michigan
- Colors: Black, purple, silver, and burgundy

Personnel
- Owners: William Davidson and William Clay Ford, Jr.
- Head coach: Mouse Davis (2001–2002); Al Luginbill (2003); Tom Luginbill (2004)

Team history
- Detroit Fury (2001–2004)

Home fields
- The Palace of Auburn Hills (2001–2004)

League / conference affiliations
- Arena Football League (2001–2004): American (2001–2002, 2004); Central Division (2001–2002, 2004); National (2003); Eastern Division (2003)

Playoff appearances (2)
- 2001, 2003

The Detroit Fury were an arena football team based in Auburn Hills, Michigan. They were a member of the original Arena Football League from 2001 to 2004 and played at The Palace of Auburn Hills, also the home of the NBA's Detroit Pistons. They were the first team to play in Detroit since the Detroit Drive, four-time ArenaBowl champions, before that franchise relocated to Worcester, Massachusetts, and were rebranded the Massachusetts Marauders. The team was co-owned by William Davidson, who owned the Pistons, along with William Clay Ford, Jr., son of the owner of the National Football League Detroit Lions.

== History ==
Eight years after the departure of the Detroit Drive to Massachusetts, Detroit Pistons owner Bill Davidson and William Clay Ford, Jr., son of Detroit Lions owner William Clay Ford, Sr., came together to purchase an expansion franchise in the original Arena Football League. A name the team contest was held in 2000 to generate public interest with over 3000 submissions. The name Detroit Fury, submitted by teenager Todd Nye, was selected as the winner. The Fury played their home games at The Palace of Auburn Hills, home of the Pistons at the time and had three coaches in four years: legendary coach Mouse Davis, former NFL Europe and XFL head coach Al Luginbill and his son Tom Luginbill, who coached the Tennessee Valley Vipers in af2. The Fury made the playoffs in their first season and again in 2003. Unfortunately, the Fury did not have the same success as its predecessors before them.

The owners were unable to find a buyer for their franchise and, on September 20, 2004, the AFL announced the termination of this franchise, and that its players would be made available to the remaining teams in a dispersal draft.

== Season-by-season ==
Season records
Season	W	L	T	Finish	Playoff results
2001	7	7	0		Lost Wild Card Round (Arizona) 52–44
2002	1	13	0		
2003	8	8	0		Won Wild Card Round (Grand Rapids) 55–54; Lost Quarterfinals (Tampa Bay) 52–48
2004	5	11	0		
Totals	22	41	0	(including playoffs)	

== Notable players ==
=== Individual awards ===
Rookie of the Year
Season	Player	Position
2001	R-Kal Truluck	OL/DL

Lineman of the Year
Season	Player	Position
2002	R-Kal Truluck	OL/DL

=== All-Arena players ===
The following Fury players were named to All-Arena Teams: OL/DL R-Kal Truluck (2)

=== All-Rookie players ===
The following Fury players were named to All-Rookie Teams: OL/DL R-Kal Truluck
