= Toronto Phantoms =

Canadian-based arena football team

Logo

General information
- Founded: 1997
- Folded: 2002
- Headquartered: Air Canada Centre in Toronto, Ontario
- Colors: Black, light blue, red, grey, and white

Personnel
- Owner: Rogers Communications (2000–2002)
- Head coach: Mark Stoute (2001–2002)

Team history
- New York CityHawks (1997–1998); New England SeaWolves (1999–2000); Toronto Phantoms (2001–2002)

Home fields
- Madison Square Garden (1997–1998); Hartford Civic Center (1999–2000); Air Canada Centre (2000–2002)

League / conference affiliations
- Arena Football League (1997–2002): National Conference (1997–2002); Eastern Division (1997–2002)

Playoff appearances (2)
- 2000, 2001

The Toronto Phantoms were a professional arena football team based in Toronto, Ontario. The team was a member of the Eastern Division of the National Conference of the Arena Football League (AFL). The team also previously operated in New York City and Hartford, Connecticut.

== History ==
=== New York CityHawks (1997–1998) ===
The team began in 1997 as the New York CityHawks. Their name was a reference to the peregrine falcon, several of which make their nests on ledges high up on New York's skyscrapers.

Despite the failure of the New York Knights in 1988, the AFL decided once again to make an effort to establish a team in the nation's largest media market, and granted a franchise to the New York CityHawks prior to the 1997 season. The major circumstance that differentiated this situation from that of the Knights was that the CityHawks were owned by Madison Square Garden, while the Knights had been tenants at the Garden.

==== Background ====
The Arena Football League had intended to re-enter the New York market in 1997 by putting an expansion team in the New Jersey Meadowlands, located just across the Hudson River from New York City. Among the ownership of the new New Jersey Red Dogs were several ex-NFL players, most notably former New York Giant Joe Morris.

In response to the AFL's placing a team in New Jersey, the Madison Square Garden ownership requested a team of its own. This request was granted by the league with only months to go before the beginning of the 1997 season, while the New Jersey team had been founded several months earlier. The CityHawks thus had only half the preparation time that the Red Dogs had going into both teams' initial season of 1997.

==== On the field ====
The CityHawks played poorly, winning only two of 14 games during their first season, despite being led by Head Coach Lary Kuharich, who had coached the Tampa Bay Storm to the league championship by winning ArenaBowl VII in 1993. Meanwhile, the cross-river Red Dogs, under Head Coach John Hufnagel, had charged out of the gate, winning 8 of their first 9 games, and setting a (then) league record by scoring 91 points in one game against the Texas Terror (a record which was surpassed in 2001 when the New York Dragons scored 99 against the Carolina Cobras). To illustrate the contrasting fortunes of the two teams: during the weekend of games that included June 20–21, the Red Dogs scored 91 points against Texas; the CityHawks scored only nine points in a loss to Tampa Bay. In 1998, the CityHawks replaced Kuharich with veteran NCAA coach Chuck Shelton, who was taking his first Arena Football job. However, the team fared almost as poorly as they had done the first season, winning only 3 of 14 games.

==== CityHawks fly away ====
The Garden announced that the club would be transferred to Hartford, Connecticut for the 1999 season, would be renamed the New England Sea Wolves, and would play at the Hartford Civic Center, an arena also managed (although not owned) by Garden management.

==== Legacy ====
The CityHawks had several individual players of outstanding quality, most notably quarterback Mike Perez, kicker Mike Black, defensive specialist/kick returner Ron Carpenter, and all-around threat Connell Maynor. Maynor, a very interesting case, was primarily a quarterback by trade, but played wide receiver/linebacker for the CityHawks. One week in 1997, he won the award for the league's top "ironman" (player who plays both on offense and defense, as six of eight players had to do at that time in Arena Football). As a quarterback, Maynor would later lead the Orlando Predators to a league championship by winning ArenaBowl XIV.

In addition, the CityHawks were the first AFL team to have different helmets for home and road games. In 1997, they wore their gold helmets at home, with black jerseys and gold pants; and wore the reverse on the road: black helmets, gold jerseys, black pants. In 1998, they adopted a one-color scheme, dressing in all black at home, and in all gold on the road.

=== New England Sea Wolves (1999–2000) ===
The New England Sea Wolves were in Hartford for two seasons, and were coached by Mike Hohensee, the former Albany Firebirds coach who has been the head coach of the Chicago Rush since that team's inception in 2001 until its fold in 2009 following the folding of the original version and subsequent revival of the league. In 2000, the Sea Wolves posted the first winning record in franchise history (8–6). That season also saw the debut of offensive specialist Damian Harrell, who went on to blossom after the team moved on to Toronto.

The team did little better financially in New England than it had in New York, and was sold to new owners, who relocated it to Toronto after the 2000 season.

=== Toronto Phantoms (2001–2002) ===
The Toronto Phantoms marked an abortive attempt by the Arena Football League to enter Canada. The team was purchased by a group led by TD Securities Inc. investment banker, Rob Godfrey. The majority share of the team was owned by Rogers Communications alongside minority owners Ronnie Strasser, Peter Shoniker and Simon Serruya The group paid a reported $6–8 million for the franchise. The Phantoms played the 2001 and 2002 Arena seasons in Toronto, and were then disbanded.

All home games were played at the Air Canada Centre, also the home of the Toronto Maple Leafs of the National Hockey League, the Toronto Raptors of the National Basketball Association, and the Toronto Rock of the National Lacrosse League. The team's primary rival was the Buffalo Destroyers, located 80 miles south in Buffalo.

The Phantoms' logo included a Grim Reaper character whose scythe carried the word "Toronto" with the word "Phantoms" appearing over it. The name came from The Phantom of the Opera, the Andrew Lloyd Webber musical that played at the Canon Theatre (then Pantages Theatre) in Toronto for nine years. The name was also a nod to minority owner Ronnie Strasser, whose family owned Phantom Industries, a women's hosiery company.

In 2001, the Phantoms posted a reasonable 8–6 record, winning the AFL Eastern Division Championship, and making the playoffs. They would beat the New York Dragons in the first round of the playoffs; however, they would lose to the Nashville Kats in the second round.

In 2002, they went 5–9, missing the playoffs. Following the season, Rogers announced that they were suspending operations of the franchise. The Phantoms drew an average of just 6,976 fans per game over their two seasons at Air Canada Centre. Six years later, Rogers entered into a five-year sharing agreement with Ralph Wilson to lease Wilson's NFL Buffalo Bills to Rogers for an annual regular season game in exchange for cash, marking the return of American football to Canada, after a fashion.

Among the notable Phantoms players were Offensive Specialist Damian Harrell, fullback/linebacker Jermaine Younger, as well as defensive back/wide receiver Ty Law (unrelated to the NFL player of the same name). During their time in Toronto, these players were not widely recognized in an already congested sports market.

== Season-by-season ==
ArenaBowl champions	ArenaBowl appearance	Division champions	Playoff berth

Season	League	Conference	Division	Regular season			Postseason results
Season	League	Conference	Division	Finish	Wins	Losses	Postseason results
New York CityHawks
1997	AFL	National	Eastern	4th	2	12	
1998	AFL	National	Eastern	3rd	3	11	
New England Sea Wolves
1999	AFL	National	Eastern	3rd	5	9	
2000	AFL	National	Eastern	2nd	8	6	Lost Wild Card Round (Oklahoma) 52–38
Toronto Phantoms
2001	AFL	National	Eastern	2nd	8	6	Won Wild Card Round (New York) 64–57; Lost Quarterfinals (Nashville) 45–38
2002	AFL	National	Eastern	3rd	5	9	
Total					31	53	(includes only regular season)
Total					1	2	(includes only the postseason)
Total					32	55	(includes both regular season and postseason)

== Notable players ==
=== Arena Football Hall of Famers ===
Toronto Phantoms Hall of Famers
No.	Name	Year Inducted	Position(s)	Years w/ Phantoms
84	Fred Gayles	2002	WR/DB	1997
--	Mike Hohensee	2012	Head Coach	1999–2000
7	Damian Harrell	2014	WR/DB	1999–2002

=== Individual awards ===
Kicker of the Year
Season	Player	Position
1999	Mike Black	K

=== All-Arena players ===
The following Phantoms players were named to All-Arena Teams:

- WR/DB Charlie Davidson (1)
- K Mike Black (1)

=== All-Rookie players ===
The following Phantoms players were named to All-Rookie Teams:

- WR/DB Ron Carpenter
- DS Anthony Derricks

== Head coaches ==
Name	Term	Regular season				Playoffs		Awards
Name	Term	W	L	T	Win%	W	L	Awards
Lary Kuharich	1997	2	12	0	.143	0	0	
Chuck Shelton	1998	3	11	0	.214	0	0	
Mike Hohensee	1999–2000	13	15	0	.464	0	1	
Mark Stoute	2001–2002	13	15	0	.464	0	1	

== Media ==
- The Cityhawks, Sea Wolves, and Phantoms all appeared on the game EA Sports Arena Football as hidden bonus teams.
