= 2003 Arena Football League season =

- League: Arena Football League
- Sport: Arena football
- Duration: January 31, 2003 – June 22, 2003

ArenaBowl XVII
- Champions: Tampa Bay Storm
- Runners-up: Arizona Rattlers
- Finals MVP: Lawrence Samuels, TB

AFL seasons
- ← 2002 2004 →

National: Eastern, Southern
American: Western, Central

The 2003 Arena Football League season was the 17th season of the Arena Football League. It was succeeded by 2004. The league champions were the Tampa Bay Storm, who defeated the Arizona Rattlers in ArenaBowl XVII. The AFL expanded its season from 14 games to 16 games.

== Standings ==
Team	Overall			Division		
Team	Wins	Losses	Percentage	Wins	Losses	Percentage
National Conference
Eastern Division
New York Dragons	8	8	0.500	4	2	0.667
Detroit Fury	8	8	0.500	3	3	0.500
Las Vegas Gladiators	8	8	0.500	4	2	0.667
Buffalo Destroyers	5	11	0.312	1	5	0.167
Southern Division
Tampa Bay Storm	12	4	0.750	5	1	0.833
Orlando Predators	12	4	0.750	4	2	0.667
Georgia Force	8	8	0.500	3	3	0.500
Carolina Cobras	0	16	0.000	0	6	0.000
American Conference
Central Division
Dallas Desperados	10	6	0.625	3	3	0.500
Grand Rapids Rampage	8	8	0.500	3	3	0.500
Chicago Rush	8	8	0.500	2	4	0.333
Indiana Firebirds	6	10	0.375	4	2	0.667
Western Division
San Jose SaberCats	12	4	0.750	5	1	0.833
Los Angeles Avengers	11	5	0.687	4	2	0.667
Arizona Rattlers	10	6	0.625	3	3	0.500
Colorado Crush	2	14	0.125	0	6	0.000

- Green indicates clinched playoff berth
- Purple indicates division champion
- Grey indicates best regular season record

== Playoffs ==
All games televised by NBC.

Wild Card Round
5	Dallas	45
12	Georgia	49
6	Arizona	69
11	Las Vegas	26
7	Grand Rapids	54
10	Detroit	55
8	New York	48
9	Chicago	45

Quarterfinals
1	San Jose	69
12	Georgia	48
4	Los Angeles	63
6	Arizona	70
2	Tampa Bay	52
10	Detroit	48
3	Orlando	69
8	New York	62

Semifinals
1	San Jose	49
6	Arizona	66
2	Tampa Bay	60
3	Orlando	50

ArenaBowl XVII
6	Arizona	29
2	Tampa Bay	43

== All-Arena team ==
Position	First team	Second team
Quarterback	Sherdrick Bonner, Arizona	Jim Kubiak, Dallas
Fullback/Linebacker	Keala Keanaaina, San Jose	Rodney Filer, New York
Wide receiver/Defensive back	Randy Gatewood, Arizona; Barry Wagner, San Jose	Will Pettis, Dallas; Evan Hlavacek, Indiana
Wide receiver/Linebacker	Greg Hopkins, Los Angeles	Lawrence Samuels, Tampa Bay
Offensive specialist	Chris Jackson, Los Angeles	Antonio Chatman, Chicago
Offensive lineman/Defensive lineman	Tom Briggs, Dallas; John Moyer, Chicago; Jermaine Smith, Georgia	B.J. Cohen, Tampa Bay; Ernest Allen, Orlando; Sam Hernandez, San Jose
Defensive specialist	Clevan Thomas, San Jose; Kenny McEntyre, Orlando	Dwaine Carpenter, Buffalo; Omarr Smith, Tampa Bay
Kicker	Clay Rush, Indiana	Steve Videtich, Las Vegas
