= 2002 Arena Football League season =

- League: Arena Football League
- Sport: Arena football
- Duration: April 19, 2002 – August 18, 2002

ArenaBowl XVI
- Champions: San Jose SaberCats
- Runners-up: Arizona Rattlers
- Finals MVP: John Dutton, SJ

AFL seasons
- ← 2001 2003 →

National: Eastern, Southern
American: Western, Central

The 2002 Arena Football League season was the 16th season of the Arena Football League. It was succeeded by 2003. The league champions were the San Jose SaberCats, who defeated the Arizona Rattlers in ArenaBowl XVI. In the process the SaberCats came closer to a perfect season than any other team in the history of the league, winning sixteen of seventeen games.

== Offseason ==
The Dallas Desperados joined the league as an expansion team based in Dallas, Texas.

The Florida Bobcats, the Houston Thunderbears, the Milwaukee Mustangs, and the Oklahoma Wranglers folded, the Bobcats and Thunderbears both folded due to poor attendance, the Mustangs folded because the teams lease at Bradley Center expired and the Wranglers were dissolved by the AFL. Meanwhile, the Nashville Kats relocated to Atlanta to become the Georgia Force because the team was unable to negotiate a deal with Bridgestone Arena.

== Standings ==
Team	Overall			Division		
Team	Wins	Losses	Percentage	Wins	Losses	Percentage
National Conference
Eastern Division
New Jersey Gladiators	9	5	0.643	4	2	0.667
Buffalo Destroyers	6	8	0.429	5	1	0.833
Toronto Phantoms	5	9	0.357	1	5	0.167
New York Dragons	3	11	0.214	2	4	0.333
Southern Division
Orlando Predators	7	7	0.500	3	3	0.500
Carolina Cobras	6	8	0.429	3	3	0.500
Tampa Bay Storm	6	8	0.429	3	3	0.500
Georgia Force	6	8	0.429	3	3	0.500
American Conference
Central Division
Chicago Rush	9	5	0.643	5	1	0.833
Grand Rapids Rampage	8	6	0.571	2	4	0.333
Indiana Firebirds	7	7	0.500	5	1	0.833
Detroit Fury	1	13	0.071	0	6	0.000
Western Division
San Jose SaberCats	13	1	0.929	5	1	0.833
Arizona Rattlers	11	3	0.786	4	2	0.667
Los Angeles Avengers	8	6	0.571	1	5	0.167
Dallas Desperados	7	7	0.500	2	4	0.333

- Green indicates clinched playoff berth
- Purple indicates division champion
- Grey indicates best regular season record

== Playoffs ==
Wild Card Round
5	Los Angeles	41
12	Tampa Bay	66
7	Orlando	32
10	Buffalo	27
6	Grand Rapids	64
11	Carolina	72
8	Dallas	47
9	Indiana	46

Quarterfinals
1	San Jose	55
12	Tampa Bay	48
4	New Jersey	46
7	Orlando	49
2	Arizona	61
11	Carolina	59
3	Chicago	60
8	Dallas	47

Semifinals
1	San Jose	52
7	Orlando	40
2	Arizona	46
3	Chicago	35

ArenaBowl XVI
1	San Jose	52
2	Arizona	14

== All-Arena team ==
Position	First team	Second team
Quarterback	Mark Grieb, San Jose	Sherdrick Bonner, Arizona
Fullback/Linebacker	Leroy Thompson, Indiana	Chad Dukes, Los Angeles
Wide receiver/Defensive back	Dameon Porter, Chicago; Barry Wagner, San Jose	Mike Furrey, New York; Willis Marshall, Grand Rapids
Wide receiver/Linebacker	Greg Hopkins, Los Angeles	Cory Fleming, Carolina
Offensive specialist	Chris Horn, Arizona	James Hundon, San Jose
Offensive lineman/Defensive lineman	R-Kal Truluck, Detroit; Chris Snyder, Indiana; James Baron, Chicago	John Moyer, Chicago; Ernest Allen, Orlando; Mike Ulufale, San Jose
Defensive specialist	Clevan Thomas, San Jose; Kenny McEntyre, Orlando	Cecil Doggette, Arizona; Damon Mason, New Jersey
Kicker	Steve Videtich, New Jersey	Steve McLaughlin, Buffalo
