= New York Dragons =

Arena football team

Logo

General information
- Founded: 1995
- Folded: 2008
- Headquartered: Nassau Veterans Memorial Coliseum in Uniondale, New York
- Colors: Black, red, gold, white

Personnel
- Owners: Steven Silva, Shanna Silva
- Head coach: Weylan Harding

Team history
- Iowa Barnstormers (1995–2000); New York Dragons (2001–2008)

Home fields
- Veterans Memorial Auditorium (1995–2000); Nassau Veterans Memorial Coliseum (2001–2008)

League / conference affiliations
- Arena Football League (1995–2008): National Conference (1995–2000); Central (1995–2000); American Conference (2001–2008); East (2001–2008)

Championships
- Conference championships: 2: 1996, 1997; Prior to 2005, the AFL did not have conference championship games
- Division championships: 7: 1996, 1997, 1999, 2000, 2003, 2004, 2005

Playoff appearances (10)
- 1995, 1996, 1997, 1999, 2000, 2001, 2003, 2005, 2006, 2008

The New York Dragons were a professional arena football team based in the New York metropolitan area. The Dragons participated in the Arena Football League's (AFL) National Conference as a member of the Eastern Division. The team was founded in 1995 as the original iteration of the Iowa Barnstormers, and relocated to New York in 2001. They played in New York until 2008, when the league folded. They played in the Eastern Division of the National Conference, and played their home games at Nassau Coliseum in Uniondale, New York. Their last coach was Weylan Harding.

== History ==
The team was based in suburban Uniondale, New York at the Nassau Veterans Memorial Coliseum, former home to the New York Islanders of the National Hockey League. The team's mascot was Sparky the Dragon, who is also mascot for the New York Islanders.

=== Iowa Barnstormers (1995–2000) ===
The franchise played in Des Moines, Iowa from 1995 to 2000, as the Iowa Barnstormers. The team had been successful in Iowa, having reached the ArenaBowl in 1996 and 1997. From 1995 to 1997, the team's starting quarterback was Kurt Warner, who moved up to the National Football League in 1998 and became an NFL MVP and Super Bowl winning quarterback.

The need for a more modern venue as well as the league's desire for a larger market led to the move to the New York City area, despite two failed past attempts in the region: the New York Knights (1988) and the New York CityHawks (1997–1998), both of which played at Madison Square Garden in Manhattan. The team was purchased by Charles Wang, who was also the Islanders' majority owner.

The Arena Football organization did award an af2 franchise to Iowa for the 2001 season also called the Barnstormers, but that team folded after that season (only to be brought back in 2008). The Barnstormers were noted for their unique uniforms, which in keeping with the aviation theme included the depiction of goggles on the helmets, wings on the shoulders of the jerseys, and propellers on the pants legs. The primary figures in the original Iowa organization were Jim Foster, the inventor of arena football, and Kurt Warner, the quarterback who went on to play for the St. Louis Rams and win both the NFL MVP and Super Bowl XXXIV MVP.

Aside from the league's desire to re-enter the New York market, another major reason cited for the team's relocation was the inadequacy of their Des Moines venue, the Iowa Veterans Memorial Auditorium, also known as "The Barn". Most of the seats in this venue were located directly along the sidelines as is typical of high school sports venues. The Barnstormers organization constantly lobbied for the construction of a better facility during their time in Des Moines, to no avail.

In 2005, the Wells Fargo Arena opened in Des Moines, directly across from what the locals call "Vets", as part of the newly expanded Iowa Events Center. A new Barnstormers af2 franchise began play there in the 2008 season.

=== New York Dragons (2001–2008) ===
On November 1, 2000, it was announced that the Iowa Barnstormers had relocated to New York as the Dragons. The Dragons' logo and uniforms were designed by Chris Trevas who is a full-time Star Wars artist. Nassau Coliseum, where the franchise relocated, is generally regarded as one of the most marginal venues currently used in major American professional sports, and is often proposed for replacement, so the improvement of the situation with regards to a venue has been fairly minimal to this point. In late September 2004, Islanders' ownership announced an ambitious project to renovate the Coliseum, surrounding it with housing units and construction of an adjacent tower, resembling a lighthouse, at a total cost of over $200 million (US). Since then, the lighthouse has been taken out of the design plan.

The New York Dragons had competed in the Eastern Division of the National Conference. They were coached by former Barnstormer defensive back Weylan Harding. In the 2006 season Weylan Harding became the winningest arena football league coach in his first two seasons as a coach, winning twenty games throughout the 2005 and 2006 seasons.

The Dragons had one of the biggest stars in the Arena Football League, in quarterback Aaron Garcia. Garcia has the honor of most touchdown passes in a game (11), and second most touchdown passes in a season (104 in 2001). Through his 10-year career, he has thrown over 800 touchdown passes.

The Dragons set the league record for most points in a game, scoring 99 against the Carolina Cobras on July 7, 2001, surpassing the previous record of 91, which had been set by the New Jersey Red Dogs in 1997 against the Texas Terror. It also set a record for the most points scored in one game (167).

On Saturday, February 11, 2006, the Dragons won against the expansion team Utah Blaze 84–81 on the road and they made AFL history for the second-most points scored in one game with 165.

On July 8, 2008 a group of investors, led by Steve Silva, announced they are buying the team from Charles Wang. With the purchase the team would change its uniforms, logo, and colors. The team also announced that the Dragons will continue to play in the Nassau Coliseum despite rumors that the Dragons would move to Manhattan and play their games at Madison Square Garden.

On September 23, 2008, the Dragons announced their new logo and color scheme. The old colors of red and yellow were replaced by green and grey.

The Dragons official mascot was a dragon named Sparky, who is also the mascot of the NHL's New York Islanders.

On December 14, 2008, the Arena Football League announced it would cancel the 2009 season, but hoped to return in 2010.

On July 20, 2009, Sports Business Journal reported that the AFL owed approximately $14 million to its creditors and were considering filing for Chapter 11 bankruptcy protection. Owners were also exploring the expansion franchise in Pittsburgh in order to use the expansion fees to help pay off the debts and infuse enough cash into the league to hold the 2010 season.[19] In early August 2009, numerous media outlets began reporting that the AFL was folding permanently and would file for Chapter 7 bankruptcy. The league released a statement on August 4 announcing that while the league is not folding, it is suspending league operations indefinitely. Several teams commented that they were still pursuing arena football in 2010 with the possibility of using the financially independent arenafootball2.[2] Despite this, several of the league's creditors have filed papers to force a Chapter 7 liquidation if the league does not do so voluntarily.[20] This request was granted on August 7, though converted to a Chapter 11 reorganization on August 26.[21]

Less than two months after the announcement, and a few weeks after the suspension forced the dissolution of af2, the Arizona Rattlers and Orlando Predators defected to Arena Football 1, a startup league consisting mostly of former af2 teams. The 16-team league expected to expand to "24 to 30" teams prior to the start of their inaugural 2010 season, and were in negotiations with at least seven other teams from the AFL to join. The New York Dragons were not part of AF1.

A phoenix franchise bearing the New York Dragons name and logos was announced for the Entertainment Football Association, a regional indoor football league, in 2025. The Dragons front office staff abruptly resigned after the league delayed the launch the 2025 inaugural season without explanation.

New York Dragons logo (2001-2008)

New York Dragons logo (2009, Unused)

== Historic moments ==
- On Saturday, July 7, 2001, in a Week 13 home game against the Carolina Cobras, QB Aaron Garcia has a prolific performance. He would throw a league-best 11 touchdown passes in the highest scoring game in league history. The Dragons would win the game 99–68. This is at #11 on the AFL's 20 Greatest Highlights Countdown.
- On June 2, 2007, Aaron Garcia became only the fourth man to ever record 800 touchdown passes. He joins the list with Clint Dolezel, Sherdrick Bonner, and Andy Kelly.
- On June 28, 2008, the Dragons, making the postseason even after finishing the season 8–8 (fourth in the National Eastern Division), went on to defeat the favored Dallas Desperados in the wild card round of the playoffs. Dallas finished second in the National Eastern Division with the record of 12–4, yet fell to an underdog New York team 77–63. They would go on to lose to the Philadelphia Soul in the following round, 49–48 on a last second touchdown pass that replays showed to be a questionable call.

== Season-by-season ==
| ArenaBowl champions | ArenaBowl appearance | Division champions | Playoff berth |

| Season | League | Conference | Division | Regular season | | | Postseason results |
| Season | League | Conference | Division | Finish | Wins | Losses | Postseason results |
|---|---|---|---|---|---|---|---|
Iowa Barnstormers
| 1995 | AFL | American | Central | 2nd | 7 | 5 | Won Quarterfinals (Arizona) 56–52; Lost Semifinals (Orlando) 56–49 |
| 1996 | AFL | American | Central | 1st | 12 | 2 | Won Quarterfinals (St. Louis) 52–49; Won Semifinals (Albany) 62–55; Lost ArenaBowl X (Tampa Bay) 42–38 |
| 1997 | AFL | American | Central | 1st | 11 | 3 | Won Quarterfinals (San Jose) 68–59; Won Semifinals (Orlando) 52–34; Lost ArenaBowl XI (Arizona) 55–33 |
| 1998 | AFL | American | Central | 3rd | 5 | 9 | |
| 1999 | AFL | American | Central | 1st | 11 | 3 | Won Quarterfinals (Milwaukee) 66–34; Lost Semifinals (Orlando) 48–41 |
| 2000 | AFL | American | Central | 1st | 9 | 5 | Lost Quarterfinals (Nashville) 63–56 |
New York Dragons
| 2001 | AFL | National | Eastern | 1st | 8 | 6 | Lost Wild Card Round (Toronto) 64–57 |
| 2002 | AFL | National | Eastern | 4th | 3 | 11 | |
| 2003 | AFL | National | Eastern | 1st | 8 | 8 | Won Wild Card Round (Chicago) 48–45; Lost Semifinals (Orlando) 69–62 |
| 2004 | AFL | National | Eastern | 1st ^{[a]} | 9 | 7 | |
| 2005 | AFL | National | Eastern | 1st | 10 | 6 | Lost Conference Semifinals (Orlando) 47–42 |
| 2006 | AFL | National | Eastern | 2nd | 10 | 6 | Lost Wild Card Round (Georgia) 72–69 |
| 2007 | AFL | National | Eastern | 4th | 5 | 11 | |
| 2008 | AFL | National | Eastern | 4th | 8 | 8 | Won Wild Card Round (Dallas) 77–63; Lost Divisional Round (Philadelphia) 49–48 |
| 2009 | The AFL suspended operations for the 2009 season. | | | | | | |
| Total | | | | | 116 | 90 | (includes only regular season) |
| Total | | | | | 8 | 10 | (includes only the postseason) |
| Total | | | | | 124 | 100 | (includes both regular season and postseason) |

== Coaches ==
| Head coach | Tenure | Regular season record (W-L) | Post season record (W-L) | Most recent coaching staff | Notes |
|---|---|---|---|---|---|
| John Gregory | 1995–2003 | 66–48 | 6–6 | | 1995 and 1996; Arena Football League; Coach of the Year. |
| Todd Shell | 2003–2004 | 17–11 | 1–1 | | 2003 Arena Football League; Coach of the Year |
| Weylan Harding | 2005–2008 | 33–31 | 1–3 | OC: Chad Lindsey; OL / co-ST coordinator: Jerome Brown; DL / co-ST coordinator: Corey Mayfield | |

== Notable players ==
=== Individual awards ===
Offensive Player of the Year
| Season | Player | Position(s) |
| 2001 | Aaron Garcia | QB |

=== All-Arena players ===
The following Dragons players were named to All-Arena Teams:

- QB Aaron Garcia (1)
- FB/LB Rodney Filer (1)
- WR/DB Mike Furrey (1)
- OL/DL Robert Stewart (1)
- DL Henry Taylor (1)
- OS Kevin Swayne (1)
- DB Billy Parker (1)
- DS Billy Parker (1)

=== All-Ironman players ===
The following Dragons players were named to All-Ironman Teams:

- WR/DB Mike Furrey (1)
- WR/LB Mike Horacek (1)
- OL/DL Marcus Owen (1)
- WR/DB/KR Will Holder (1)

=== All-Rookie players ===
The following Dragons players were named to All-Rookie Teams:

- WR/DB Lincoln Dupree
- OL/DL Delbert Cowsette
- DL John Nix, Farouk Adelekan
- DB Levy Brown
- DS Billy Parker, Dahnel Singfield
- WR/LB Tierre Jones

=== NFL players/coaches ===
The following players coached or played in the NFL

- QBKurt Warner
- K Rob Bironas
- K Matt Bryant
- WR Mike Furrey
- QB Danny Kanell
- WR Kevin Swayne
- QB Matt Nagy (coach)
