= Carolina Cobras =

Arena football team

Logo

General information
- Founded: 2000
- Folded: 2004
- Headquartered: Charlotte Coliseum in Charlotte, North Carolina
- Colors: Red, black, and old gold

Personnel
- Owner: Pete Loftin
- Head coach: Ron Selesky

Team history
- Carolina Cobras (2000–2004)

Home fields
- Raleigh Entertainment & Sports Arena (2000–2002); Charlotte Coliseum (2003–2004)

League / conference affiliations
- Arena Football League (2000–2004): National Conference (2000–2004); Southern Division (2000, 2002–2003); Eastern Division (2001, 2004)

Playoff appearances (2)
- 2001, 2002

The Carolina Cobras were an expansion franchise in the Arena Football League. The team was formed prior to the 2000 season, which endured a player strike.

The team was originally based in Raleigh, North Carolina, but moved to Charlotte following its third season.

== History ==
They played their home games in Raleigh, North Carolina, at the Raleigh Entertainment & Sports Arena, now called the Lenovo Center, prior to the 2003 season. The team was based in the Charlotte Coliseum through 2004. Coaching staff included: Ed Khayat, John Gregory, Ron Selesky, Ray Jauch. On September 20, 2004, prior to the arrival of the NBA's Charlotte Bobcats, the league announced the termination of this franchise; its players were made available to the other AFL teams in a dispersal draft.

== Legacy ==
The Cobras' legacy in Charlotte was actually meant to fill open dates at the Charlotte Coliseum when the original Charlotte Hornets moved to New Orleans. When the Charlotte Bobcats began play, the Cobras were no longer necessary.

The Cobras' name (previously used for one year by the Charlotte Cobras of the Major Indoor Lacrosse League) is now in use by the city of Charlotte for its works team in the National Public Safety Football League.

== Season-by-season ==
ArenaBowl champions	ArenaBowl appearance	Division champions	Playoff berth

Season	League	Conference	Division	Regular season			Postseason results
Season	League	Conference	Division	Finish	Wins	Losses	Postseason results
Carolina Cobras
2000	AFL	National	Southern	5th	3	11	
2001	AFL	National	Eastern	3rd	7	7	Lost Wild Card Round (Indiana) 58–41
2002	AFL	National	Southern	2nd	6	8	Won Wild Card Round (Grand Rapids) 72–64; Lost Quarterfinals (Arizona) 61–59
2003	AFL	National	Southern	4th	0	16	
2004	AFL	National	Eastern	2nd	6	10	
Total					22	52	(includes only regular season)
Total					1	2	(includes only the postseason)
Total					23	54	(includes both regular season and postseason)

== Notable players ==
=== Arena Football Hall of Famers ===
Carolina Cobras Hall of Famers
No.	Name	Year inducted	Position(s)	Years w/ Cobras
12	Cory Fleming	2013	WR/LB	2002

=== All-Arena players ===
The following Cobras players have been named to All-Arena Teams:

- WR/LB Cory Fleming (1)

=== All-Ironman players ===
The following Cobras players have been named to All-Ironman Teams:

- WR/DB Cornelius White (1)
- WR/LB Cory Fleming (1)

=== All-Rookie players ===
The following Cobras players have been named to All-Rookie Teams:

- OL/DL Silas DeMary
