= Columbus Destroyers =

Arena football team

Logo

General information
- Founded: 1999
- Folded: 2008; 2019
- Headquartered: Nationwide Arena in Columbus, Ohio
- Colors: Black, white, gray
- ColumbusDestroyers.com

Personnel
- Owner: Arena Football League
- Head coach: Matthew Sauk

Team history
- Buffalo Destroyers (1999–2003); Columbus Destroyers (2004–2008; 2019)

Home fields
- HSBC Arena (1999–2003); Nationwide Arena (2004–2008; 2019)

League / conference affiliations
- Arena Football League (1999–2008; 2019)

Championships
- Conference championships: 1: 2007
- Division championships: 1: 2007

Playoff appearances (3)
- 2000, 2002, 2007

The Columbus Destroyers were an Arena Football League (AFL) team based in Columbus, Ohio, with home games in Nationwide Arena. The team was founded in 1999 as the Buffalo Destroyers, based in Buffalo, New York, and relocated to Columbus in 2004. They folded along with the original incarnation of the AFL following the 2008 season, after a total of ten seasons of play.

On February 7, 2019, the AFL announced that it had placed an expansion team in Columbus and once again play at Nationwide Arena. The league announced on February 22, 2019, that the team as a re-launch of the Destroyers and revealed the new logo and Matthew Sauk as the head coach.

After the 2019 season, the AFL announced that they had suspended local business operations including the Destroyers, but were looking into become a traveling league. A month later, on November 27, 2019, the league announced that they had filed for Chapter 7 bankruptcy and were ceasing operations.

== History ==
=== Buffalo Destroyers (1999–2003) ===
The Buffalo Destroyers began play during the 1999 AFL season, playing their home games at HSBC Arena (now known as KeyBank Center), and were owned by Buffalo-area businessman Mark Hamister. The team was founded, in part, because of fears that a lease expiration could have led to the demise or relocation of the NFL's Buffalo Bills, the city's largest sports franchise. Those fears were unfounded as a multiyear lease deal to keep the Bills in Western New York was signed shortly thereafter and remained in effect long after the Destroyers left Buffalo (the lease was again renewed in 2012). The name "Destroyers" came from a naming contest and alluded to the naval ship of the same name, one of which sits outside the HSBC Arena in the nearby Buffalo Naval and Serviceman's Park.

The Destroyers initially attracted high attendance levels, among the league's highest, but a lack of winning early on caused attendance to decline, something from which the team never recovered. Among the members of the inaugural roster was former NFL kicker Bjorn Nittmo. Former New York Jets starting quarterback Browning Nagle played for the Destroyers during this period as well. The first head coach, Dave Whinham, was fired in the middle of the Destroyers' second season after an abysmal 1–17 record. Former Buffalo Bills player Ray Bentley was selected as his replacement; however, he couldn't lead the Destroyers to a winning season. The closest he came was in 2001, when his team started 6–3 but would end the season on an 0–5 skid to just barely miss the playoffs. The team had another 6–8 season, this time enough to make the playoffs but lost in the first round, in 2002. Bentley abruptly resigned after that season to take a job in broadcasting, and Ron Selesky, a respected personnel man was hired to replace him. Selesky's record in 2003 was a lackluster 5–11. Jerry Crafts, former Bills offensive lineman, played for the Destroyers in 2001 and served most notably as nose tackle, anchoring one of the league's better defenses.

After the 2003 season concluded, talks of a re-location began, as the Destroyers had lost $5 million over five years, went nearly unnoticed by the media (NBC had blacked out all of their games in 2003), and suffered from a lack of local support reflected in low attendance levels that had dropped dramatically from their early highs. At the time, Destroyers owner Hamister was also in the running, along with partner Todd Berman, to buy the Buffalo Sabres of the NHL, but a deal for a state incentive package fell through and the team was instead sold to Rochester-area entrepreneur and politician B. Thomas Golisano. Shortly after the Sabres deal fell through, in September 2003, Hamister announced that he was relocating the Destroyers to Columbus, Ohio for the 2004 season.

=== First iteration of the Columbus Destroyers (2004–2008) ===
The Buffalo Destroyers moved to Columbus after the 2003 Arena Football League season. They played their home games in downtown's Nationwide Arena, which they shared with the National Hockey League's Columbus Blue Jackets. The last time the AFL played in Columbus was the expansion Columbus Thunderbolts back in 1991. After one season, they relocated to Cleveland.

The Destroyers were sold to John H. McConnell, founder of Worthington Industries and majority owner of the Blue Jackets, and accountant Jim Renacci. Also owning a stake in the team was NFL wide receiver and former Ohio State football standout Joey Galloway. Mark Hamister, who owned the team during the Buffalo tenure, initially stayed on as a minority owner, but would eventually sell his share.

The Columbus Destroyers, over their first two years, would often market people with the team who are also associated with Ohio State University football program, rather than the team itself. In the 2004 season, it relied heavily on head coach, former Ohio State coach Earle Bruce, and front office worker Chris Spielman. In the 2005 season, Spielman became head coach of the team and much of the Destroyers merchandise bore his name. However, as the 2006 season approached, the team appeared to have dropped marketing Ohio State personalities, instead promoting the Destroyers playing "Fast-forward football". Afterwards, the Destroyers have enjoyed more success, finishing 7–9 in 2006 and making a run all the way to ArenaBowl XXI in 2007.

Despite high hopes the 2008 Destroyers weren't able to capitalize on the previous two years success and finished with a 3–13 record. It was announced at the end of the season that Destroyers ownership and Doug Kay had reached a decision that he would not return as head coach.

The Destroyers' mascot's name was Bruiser.

The Destroyers were better received in Columbus than they had been in Buffalo, as their attendance levels were some of the highest in the AFL, and they were regularly covered in the media. Home games were televised locally on Columbus Sports Network, but this coverage ceased after the network folded. All games were broadcast on their radio partner Wink 107.1 FM.

In 2009, the AFL declared bankruptcy after the owners could not agree on a new financial plan. Arena Football 1, the entity that bought the AFL out of bankruptcy in late 2009, maintained the Destroyers trademark for the next decade. When the league relaunched in 2010, it kept the brands of several of the pre-bankruptcy teams.

=== Second iteration (2019) ===
On February 11, 2019, the league announced an expansion team for Columbus that would begin play the 2019 season. On February 22, at Nationwide Arena, the AFL announced that the team would be a revival of the Destroyers, with the same logo as before in a simplified grayscale color scheme, and introduced Matthew Sauk as the new head coach.

In October 2019, the league ceased all team operations, including the Destroyers, and then filed for Chapter 7 bankruptcy in November.

== Attempts to revive the Buffalo Destroyers ==
On May 24, 2008, the Arena Football League announced that it was returning to Buffalo with a new franchise to be owned by Bills alumni Jim Kelly and Thurman Thomas along with Rochester Raiders owner Bob Bartosiewicz. That team was to play in the AFL's minor league system, af2. The team was originally scheduled to begin play in 2009, but did not materialize in time for that season. Bartosiewicz later noted in 2023 that he "didn't like what [he] was seeing" in the af2 at the time and withdrew from the agreement.

In 2018, an exhibit honoring the 20th anniversary of the Destroyers' establishment went on display at the Buffalo History Museum. It was attended mostly by former front office staffers.

Though Bartosiewicz expressed interest in reviving the Buffalo Destroyers if additional partners could be brought on for the project, neither Buffalo nor Columbus was included among the 16 cities that the third iteration of the AFL would play in its inaugural 2024 season when those cities were announced in July 2023. In Buffalo's case, the unusually high cost of worker's compensation in the state of New York poses an obstacle, as the Albany Firebirds had to renegotiate their premium to a level that was affordable. The rights to the Buffalo Destroyers name are held as of 2025 by Stevie Johnson, a former Buffalo Bills wide receiver, who was partnering with his former teammate Fred Jackson (an Indoor Football League alumnus) and a consortium of other investors to bring an IFL team to Buffalo under the Destroyers brand. A later report indicated that the IFL was not the only league being considered for the Destroyers revival, and that turf and equipment was in the process of being purchased.

== Memorable Destroyers moments ==
First Game

- On April 30, 1999, Columbus played their first game as the Buffalo Destroyers. They lost to the New England Sea Wolves 59–26 in Marine Midland Arena in front of 13,214 fans. They finished with a 1–13 record that year, thus failing to qualify for the playoffs in their inaugural season.

First Playoff Game

- It took their second season to post a playoff position, with their only five wins coming as a five-game winning streak before dropping their season finale in San Jose. Their playoff game against the Arizona Rattlers took place on July 27, 2000, with a crowd of 9,471 at the US Airways Center (then named America West Arena, dubbed "the Snake Pit") in Phoenix. The Rattlers trumped the Destroyers with a 41–34 decision and knocking Buffalo out of the playoffs.

Last Game in Buffalo

- The team hosted the New York Dragons on May 11, 2003, in front of 6,116 at HSBC Arena. The Destroyers lost the game 49–30.

Last Game as Buffalo

- In front of 9,701 fans at the Thomas and Mack Center, the team lost to the then Las Vegas Gladiators by a score of 55–38 on May 15, 2003

Move to Columbus

- The team moved to Columbus after the 2003 season. They played their first home game against the Carolina Cobras and lost 54–53 in front of a team record 17,171 fans.

Road to Arena Bowl XXI

- On July 7, 2007, they upset the heavily favored Dallas Desperados who had a regular season record of 15–1. ESPN ranked it as one of history's top upsets.
- One week later on July 14, 2007, The Destroyers reached their first Arena Bowl after defeating the heavily favored 14–2 Georgia Force 66–56.
- On July 21, 2007, the Destroyers had a bye in the Arena Bowl playoffs, where they broke local attendance records by beating up and destroying a Ford Focus compact car. This resulted in a Columbus Dispatch front-page story on July 22, 2007, where the editors of the paper declared the team "Chevy Strong."
- The playoff run ended on July 29 when they played the San Jose SaberCats in ArenaBowl XXI. After the Destroyers played great football during the first half, they seemed to lose some momentum during the second half. In the end they lost to the Cats 55–33 in front of a sellout New Orleans Arena crowd.

== Season-by-season ==
ArenaBowl champions	ArenaBowl appearance	Division champions	Playoff berth

Season	League	Conference	Division	Regular season			Postseason results
Season	League	Conference	Division	Finish	Wins	Losses	Postseason results
Buffalo Destroyers
1999	AFL	National	Eastern	4th	1	13	
2000	AFL	National	Eastern	3rd	5	9	Lost Wild Card Round (Arizona) 41–34
2001	AFL	National	Eastern	4th	6	8	
2002	AFL	National	Eastern	2nd	6	8	Lost Wild Card Round (Orlando) 32–27
2003	AFL	National	Eastern	4th	5	11	
Columbus Destroyers
2004	AFL	National	Eastern	4th	6	10	
2005	AFL	National	Eastern	4th	2	14	
2006	AFL	National	Eastern	4th	8	8	
2007	AFL	National	Eastern	3rd	7	9	Won Wild Card Round (Tampa Bay) 56–55; Won Divisional Round (Dallas) 66–59; Won Conference Championship (Georgia) 66–56; Lost ArenaBowl XXI (San Jose) 55–33
2008	AFL	National	Eastern	5th	3	13	
Columbus Destroyers
2019	AFL	National	—	6th	1	11	
Total					50	109	(includes only regular season)
Total					3	3	(includes only the postseason)
Total					53	112	(includes both regular season and postseason)

== Coaches ==
Head coach	Tenure	Regular season record (W-L)	Post season record (W-L)	Most recent coaching staff	Notes
Dave Whinham	1999 – 2000	1–17	0–0		
Ray Bentley	2000 – 2002	17–21	0–2	OC: Tony Kimbrough	
Ron Selesky	2003	5–11	0–0		
Earle Bruce	2004	6–10	0–0	OC: Pete Costanza; DC: Weylan Harding	
Chris Spielman	2005	2–14	0–0	OC: Pete Costanza; DC: Ron Selesky; STC: Jeff Hoffman	
Doug Kay	2006 – 2008	19–30	3–1	OC: Ken Matous and Lary Kuharich (Kuharich took over after week 7); Other Coaches: Cecil Doggette, John Churchill, John Zinser, Michael Baker, Josh Taylor	
Pat Sperduto	2009	0–0	0–0	OC: Chris Boden; DC: Doug Lytle; Line Coach: Pat Downey	
Matthew Sauk	2019	1–11	0–0		

== Players of note ==
=== Arena Football Hall of Famers ===
Buffalo / Columbus Destroyers Hall of Famers
No.	Name	Year Inducted	Position(s)	Years w/ Destroyers
–	Sylvester Bembery	2011	OL/DL	2000

=== Individual awards ===
Defensive Player of the Year
Season	Player	Position
2006	Jerald Brown	DS

=== All-Arena players ===
The following Destroyers players were named to All-Arena Teams:

- C Will Rabatin (1)
- OL Howard Duncan (1)
- DL Ken Jones (1)
- DS Dwaine Carpenter (1), Jerald Brown (1)
- K Steve McLaughlin (1)

=== All-Ironman players ===
The following Destroyers players were named to All-Ironman Teams:

- FB/LB Harold Wells (2)
- WR/LB Sedrick Robinson (1), Cornelius White (1), B. J. Barre (1)

=== All-Rookie players ===
The following Destroyers players were named to All-Rookie Teams:

- C Will Rabatin
- OL/DL Kerwin Hairston
- DS Prentice Taylor
