= 2007 Chicago Rush season =

Arena Football League team season

- Head coach: Mike Hohensee
- Home stadium: Allstate Arena

Results
- Record: 12–4
- Division place: 1st
- Playoffs: Won Divisional Playoffs (Avengers) 52–20; Lost Conference Championship (SaberCats 49–61

The 2007 Chicago Rush season was the seventh season for the franchise. They looked to win the ArenaBowl again after winning it in 2006 with a 7–9 record. They won the American Football Conference Central Division with a 12–4 record and qualified for the playoffs as the #2 playoff seed in the conference, losing in the conference championship to the San Jose SaberCats.

== Schedule ==
=== Regular season ===
Week	Date	Opponent	Home/Away Game	Result
1	March 4	Kansas City Brigade	Away	L 54–41
2	March 9	San Jose SaberCats	Home	W 48–45
3	March 18	New York Dragons	Home	W 61–40
4	March 24	Columbus Destroyers	Away	W 55–47
5	April 1	Los Angeles Avengers	Home	W 66–31
6	April 7	Nashville Kats	Away	W 66–54
7		Bye	Week	
8	April 21	Grand Rapids Rampage	Away	W 75–54
9	April 30	Philadelphia Soul	Home	W 54–43
10	May 7	Colorado Crush	Home	W 59–48
11	May 14	Dallas Desperados	Away	L 52–48
12	May 19	Nashville Kats	Home	L 44–27
13	May 26	Arizona Rattlers	Away	W 53–47
14	June 2	Los Angeles Avengers	Away	L 50–47
15	June 9	Grand Rapids Rampage	Home	W 55–32
16	June 18	Colorado Crush	Away	W 66–57
17	June 23	Kansas City Brigade	Home	W 48–21

=== Playoffs ===
Round	Date	Opponent	Home/Away Game	Result
AC Divisional	March 4	Los Angeles Avengers	Away	W 52–20
AC Championship	March 4	San Jose SaberCats	Away	L 61–49

== Coaching ==
Mike Hohensee started his seventh season as head coach of the Rush.

== Personnel moves ==
=== 2007 roster ===
Uniform #	Player	Position	Height	Weight (lb)
23	DeJuan Alfonzo	DS	6'0"	205
13	Kevin Beard	WR	6'1"	192
88	D.J. Bleisath	OL/DL	6'2"	280
94	Robert Boss	OL/DL	6'5"	296
75	Jason Holshoe	OL/DL	6'4"	285
96	E.J. Burt	OL/DL	6'2"	265
1	Woody Dantzler	WR/DB	6'0"	205
10	Matt D'Orazio	QB	6'4"	215
55	Curtis Eason	OL/DL	6'2"	290
4	Dan Frantz	K	6'1"	200
0	Pete McMahon	OL	6'8"	330
44	Bob McMillen	FB/LB	6'3"	260
85	Andy McCullough	WR	6'4"	216
81	Ahmad Merritt	WR	5'10"	195
8	Russ Michna	QB	6'2"	220
66	Frank Moore	OL/DL	6'2"	315
99	John Moyer	OL/DL	6'3"	265
5	Nick Myers	OL/DL	6'3"	285
20	Jonathan Ordway	DB	5'10"	178
93	Joe Peters	OL/DL	6'5"	275
21	Dennison Robinson	WR/DB	6'0"	195
7	James Sadler	WR/DB	6'0"	205
3	Russell Shaw	WR/DB	5'10"	190
98	John Sikora	OL/DL	6'4"	280
3	Bobby Sippio	OS	6'3"	220
58	Khreem Smith	OL/DL	6'4"	270
37	Jeremy Unertl	WR/DB	6'2"	220
97	Demetrios Walker	DL	6'3"	260

== Stats ==
=== Offense ===
==== Passing ====
Player	Comp.	Att.	Comp%	Yards	TD's	INT's	Long	Rating
Matt D'Orazio	351	506	69.4	3789	82	10	48	122.4

==== Rushing ====
Player	Car.	Yards	Avg.	TD's	Long
Matt D'Orazio	61	134	2.2	12	18
Bob McMillen	35	91	2.6	5	14
DeJuan Alfonzo	13	57	4.4	7	38
Rob Mager	5	27	5.4	2	11
Etu Molden	4	14	3.5	1	6
Bobby Sippio	4	11	2.8	0	8
Ahmad Merritt	4	8	2	0	4
Joe Peters	2	4	2	1	3
Russ Michna	3	3	1	1	2
Buchie Ibeh	1	−2	−2	0	−2

==== Receiving ====
Player	Rec.	Yards	Avg.	TD's	Long
Bobby Sippio	125	1739	13.9	53	48
Etu Molden	81	977	12.1	13	44
Rob Mager	75	811	10.8	13	45
DeJuan Alfonzo	27	245	19.1	7	31
Ahmad Merritt	20	203	10.2	2	33
Bob McMillen	9	84	9.3	1	31
Buchie Ibeh	7	71	10.1	0	16
Kevin Beard	7	47	6.7	0	9
Robert Boss	2	19	9.5	2	14
Woody Dantzler	1	15	15	0	15
John Moyer	1	6	6	1	6

==== Touchdowns ====
Player	TD's	Rush	Rec	Ret	Pts
Bobby Sippio	53	0	53	0	318
DeJuan Alfonzo	15	7	7	1	120
Etu Molden	15	2	13	0	90
Rob Mager	14	2	12	0	84
Matt D'Orazio	12	12	0	0	74
Bob McMillen	6	5	1	0	36
Jonathan Ordway	3	0	0	3	18
Robert Boss	2	0	2	0	14
Ahmad Merritt	2	0	2	0	12
John Moyer	1	0	1	0	12
Russ Michna	1	1	0	0	6
Joe Peters	1	1	0	0	6

=== Defense ===
Player	Tackles	Solo	Assisted	Sack	Solo	Assisted	INT	Yards	TD's	Long
Dennison Robinson	102	88	28	0	0	0	7	45	0	22
DeJuan Alfonzo	93	66	54	0	0	0	6	147	3	47
Jeremy Unertl	72.5	64	17	0	0	0	6	75	0	26
James Sadler	40	31	18	0	0	0	1	0	0	0
Jonathan Ordway	39	35	8	0	0	0	3	0	0	0
D.J. Bleisath	32.5	24	17	1	1	0	0	0	0	0
John Moyer	30.5	19	23	3	3	0	1	39	1	39
Joe Peters	25.5	14	23	1	1	0	0	0	0	0
E.J. Burt	21.5	15	11	5	5	0	0	0	0	0
Curtis Eason	16.5	8	17	1	1	0	0	0	0	0
Russell Shaw	14.5	12	5	0	0	0	0	0	0	0
Dan Frantz	12.5	11	3	0	0	0	0	0	0	0
Bob McMillen	5	3	4	0	0	0	0	0	0	0
Ahmad Merritt	5	4	2	0	0	0	0	0	0	0
Etu Molden	5	3	4	0	0	0	0	0	0	0
John Sikora	4	3	2	0	0	0	0	0	0	0
Robert Boss	3	3	0	0	0	0	0	0	0	0
Bobby Sippio	2	2	0	0	0	0	0	0	0	0
Matt D'Orazio	1	1	0	0	0	0	0	0	0	0
Rob Mager	1	1	0	0	0	0	0	0	0	0

=== Special teams ===
==== Kick return ====
Player	Ret	Yards	TD's	Long	Avg	Ret	Yards	TD's	Long	Avg
Jonathan Ordway	40	812	3	57	20.3	1	13	0	13	13
Russell Shaw	16	321	0	43	20.1	2	47	0	25	23.5
Etu Molden	12	126	0	16	10.5	0	0	0	0	0
Woody Dantzler	6	101	0	27	16.8	0	0	0	0	0
Rob Mager	3	46	0	16	15.3	0	0	0	0	0
DeJuan Alfonzo	4	35	0	19	8.8	2	20	1	12	10
Bobby Sippio	1	35	0	35	35	0	0	0	0	0
Bob McMillen	1	5	0	5	5	0	0	0	0	0
James Sadler	1	2	0	2	2	1	23	0	23	23
Ahmad Merritt	0	0	0	0	0	1	32	0	32	32
Dennison Robinson	0	0	0	0	0	1	2	0	24	12
John Sikora	0	0	0	0	0	1	0	0	0	0

==== Kicking ====
Player	Extra pt.	Extra pt. Att.	FG	FGA	Long	Pct.	Pts
Dan Frantz	104	115	11	27	56	0.407	137

== Playoff Stats ==
=== Offense ===
==== Quarterback ====
Player	Comp.	Att.	Comp%	Yards	TD's	INT's

==== Running backs ====
Player	Car.	Yards	Avg.	TD's	Long

==== Wide receivers ====
Player	Rec.	Yards	Avg.	TD's	Long

=== Special teams ===
==== Kick return ====
Player	Ret	Yards	Avg	Long

==== Kicking ====
Player	Extra pt.	Extra pt. Att.	FG	FGA	Long	Pts

== Regular season ==
=== Week 1: at Kansas City Brigade ===
	1	2	3	4	Total
CHI	13	6	7	15	41
KC	7	16	12	19	54

at Kemper Arena, Kansas City, Missouri

Scoring summary:

1st Quarter:

- 11:42 – CHI 18 yd Pass to Bobby Sippio from Matt D'Orazio (Failed PAT)
- 07:21 – KC 1 yd Run by Raymond Philyaw (PAT by Clay Rush)
- 02:07 – CHI 24 yd Interception Return TD by DeJuan Alfonzo (PAT by Dan Frantz)

2nd Quarter:

- 12:11 – KC 5 yd Pass to Jerel Myersfrom Raymond Philyaw (PAT by Rush)
- 11:29 – KC Safety
- 06:41 – KC 11 yd Pass to Jerel Myers from Raymond Philyaw (PAT by Rush)
- 01:10 – CHI 2 yd Pass to Bobby Sippio from Matt D'Orazio (Failed PAT by Dan Frantz)

3rd Quarter:

4th Quarter:

=== Week 2: vs San Jose SaberCats ===
	1	2	3	4	Total
SJS	14	3	7	21	45
CHI	17	10	7	14	48

at Allstate Arena, Chicago

Scoring summary:

1st Quarter:

- 10:40 CHI – Bobby Sippio 23 yd pass from Matt D'Orazio (Dan Frantz kick) – 7–0 CHI
- 06:04 SJS – George Williams 5 yd pass from Mark Grieb (A.J. Haglund kick) – 7–7
- 02:00 CHI – Dan Frantz 56 yd field goal – 10–7 CHI
- 01:20 SJS – Rodney Wright 43 yd pass from Mark Grieb (A.J. Haglund kick) – 14–10 SJS
- 00:32 CHI – Jonathan Ordway 57 yd kickoff return (Dan Frantz kick) – 17–14 CHI

2nd Quarter:

- 03:26 CHI – Bobby Sippio 3 yd pass from Matt D'Orazio (Dan Frantz kick) – 24–14 CHI
- 00:09 SJS – A.J. Haglund 25 yd field goal – 24–17 CHI
- 00:00 CHI – Dan Frantz 39 yd field goal – 27–17 CHI

3rd Quarter:

- 11:20 CHI – Andy McCullough 12 yd pass from Matt D'Orazio (Dan Frantz kick) – 34–17 CHI
- 05:42 SJS – George Williams 2 yd pass from Mark Grieb (A.J. Haglund kick) – 34–24 CHI

4th Quarter:

- 14:14 CHI – Bobby Sippio 9 yd pass from Matt D'Orazio (Dan Frantz kick) – 41–24 CHI
- 09:49 SJS – James Roe 9 yd pass from Mark Grieb (A.J. Haglund kick) – 41–31 CHI
- 05:58 SJS – James Roe 12 yd pass from Mark Grieb (A.J. Haglund kick) – 41–38 CHI
- 03:07 CHI – Andy McCullough 8 yd pass from Matt D'Orazio (Dan Frantz kick) – 48–38 CHI
- 00:43 SJS – Ben Nelson 5 yd pass from Mark Grieb (A.J. Haglund kick) – 48–45 CHI

=== Week 3: vs New York Dragons ===
	1	2	3	4	Total
NYD	14	16	3	7	40
CHI	7	20	14	20	61

at Allstate Arena, Chicago

Scoring summary:

1st Quarter:

- 11:34 NYD – Ja'Mar Toombs 1 yd run (Carter Warley kick) – 7–0 NYD
- 06:44 CHI – Matt D'Orazio 4 yd run (Dan Frantz kick) – 7–7
- 02:01 NYD – Mike Horacek 4 yd pass from Rohan Davey (Carter Warley kick) – 14–7 NYD

2nd Quarter:

- 10:13 NYD – Carter Warley 48 yd field goal – 17–7 NYD
- 09:50 CHI – Jonathan Ordway 55 yd kickoff return (Dan Frantz kick) – 17–14 NYD
- 07:27 NYD – Kevin Swayne 25 yd pass from Rohan Davey (Carter Warley kick failed) – 23–14 NYD
- 05:52 CHI – Bobby Sippio 33 yd pass from Matt D'Orazio (Dan Frantz kick) – 23–21 NYD
- 01:20 CHI – Bobby Sippio 15 yd pass from Matt D'Orazio (Bobby Sippio rush failed) – 27–23 CHI
- 00:32 NYD – Mike Horacek 29 yd pass from Rohan Davey (Carter Warley kick) – 30–27 NYD

3rd Quarter:

- 09:24 NYD – Carter Warley 24 yd field goal – 33–27 NYD
- 06:42 CHI – Bobby Sippio 24 yd pass from Matt D'Orazio (Dan Frantz kick) – 34–33 CHI
- 00:53 CHI – Ahmad Merritt 9 yd pass from Matt D'Orazio (Dan Frantz kick) – 41–33 CHI

4th Quarter:

- 13:09 CHI – DeJuan Alfonzo 2 yd fumble recovery (Dan Frantz kick failed) – 47–33 CHI
- 09:11 CHI – Bobby Sippio 12 yd pass from Matt D'Orazio (Dan Frantz kick) – 54–33 CHI
- 05:14 CHI – Bobby Sippio 16 yd pass from Matt D'Orazio (Dan Frantz kick) – 61–33 CHI
- 02:01 NYD – Ja'Mar Toombs 2 yd run (Carter Warley kick) – 61–40 CHI

=== Week 4: at Columbus Destroyers ===
	1	2	3	4	Total
CHI	14	24	7	10	55
CLB	14	14	6	13	47

at Nationwide Arena, Columbus, Ohio

Scoring summary:

1st Quarter:

2nd Quarter:

3rd Quarter:

4th Quarter:

=== Week 5: vs Los Angeles Avengers ===
	1	2	3	4	Total
LA	0	10	7	14	31
CHI	7	35	14	10	66

at Allstate Arena, Chicago

Scoring summary:

1st Quarter:

2nd Quarter:

3rd Quarter:

4th Quarter:

=== Week 6: at Nashville Kats ===
	1	2	3	4	Total
CHI	21	10	14	21	66
NSH	14	7	7	26	54

at Nashville Arena, Nashville, Tennessee

Scoring summary:

1st Quarter:

2nd Quarter:

3rd Quarter:

4th Quarter:

=== Week 8: at Grand Rapids Rampage ===
	1	2	3	4	Total
CHI	7	20	20	28	75
GR	19	14	14	7	54

at Van Andel Arena, Grand Rapids, Michigan

Scoring summary:

1st Quarter:

2nd Quarter:

3rd Quarter:

4th Quarter:

=== Week 9: vs Philadelphia Soul ===
	1	2	3	4	Total
PHI	14	20	3	6	43
CHI	7	13	14	20	54

at Allstate Arena, Chicago

Scoring summary:

1st Quarter:

2nd Quarter:

3rd Quarter:

4th Quarter:

=== Week 10: vs Colorado Crush ===
	1	2	3	4	Total
COL	13	20	7	8	48
CHI	0	28	21	10	59

at Allstate Arena, Chicago

Scoring summary:

1st Quarter:

2nd Quarter:

3rd Quarter:

4th Quarter:

=== Week 11: at Dallas Desperados ===
	1	2	3	4	Total
CHI	7	14	6	21	48
DAL	14	17	7	14	52

at the American Airlines Center, Dallas, Texas

Scoring summary:

1st Quarter:

2nd Quarter:

3rd Quarter:

4th Quarter:

=== Week 12: vs Nashville Kats ===
	1	2	3	4	Total
NSH	7	9	14	14	44
CHI	7	14	6	0	27

at Allstate Arena, Chicago

Scoring summary:

1st Quarter:

2nd Quarter:

3rd Quarter:

4th Quarter:

=== Week 13: at Arizona Rattlers ===
	1	2	3	4	Total
CHI	3	21	14	15	53
ARI	14	0	13	20	47

at the US Airways Center, Phoenix, Arizona

Scoring summary:

1st Quarter:

2nd Quarter:

3rd Quarter:

4th Quarter:

=== Week 14: at Los Angeles Avengers ===
	1	2	3	4	Total
CHI	7	13	7	20	47
LA	9	21	7	13	50

at the Staples Center, Los Angeles

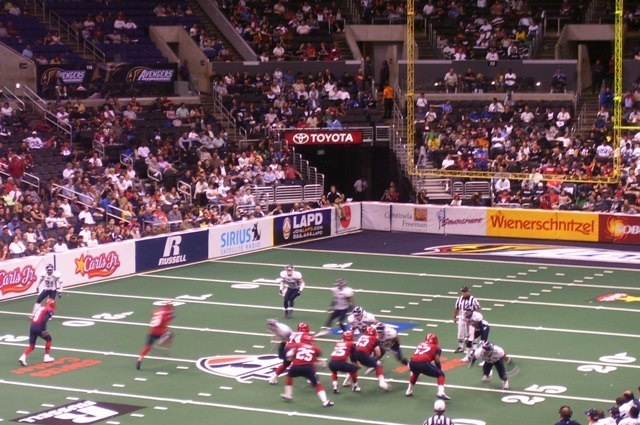
The Rush on defense prior to a play vs. the LA Avengers.

Scoring summary:

1st Quarter:

- 10:46 LA – Remy Hamilton 26 yd field goal – 3–0 LA
- 06:20 CHI – Rob Mager 19 yd pass from Matt D'Orazio (Dan Frantz kick) – 7–3 CHI
- 01:47 LA – Terrance Stubbs 10 yd pass from Sonny Cumbie (Remy Hamilton kick failed) – 9–7 LA

2nd Quarter:

- 14:18 CHI – Matt D'Orazio 6 yd run (Dan Frantz kick) – 14–9 CHI
- 08:51 LA – Lonnie Ford 1 yd run (Remy Hamilton kick) – 16–14 LA
- 04:49 CHI – DeJuan Alvonzo 10 yd pass from Matt D'Orazio – 20–16 CHI
- 00:33 LA – LaShaun Ward 13 yd pass from Sonny Cumbie (Remy Hamilton kick) – 23–20 LA
- 00:22 LA – Robert Quiroga 0 yd fumble recovery (Remy Hamilton kick) – 30–20 LA

3rd Quarter:

- 06:40 CHI – Joe Peters 1 yd run (Dan Frantz kick) – 30–27 LA
- 02:04 LA – Sonny Cumbie 5 yd run (Remy Hamilton kick) – 37–27 LA

4th Quarter:

- 14:55 CHI – Rob Mager 19 yd pass from Matt D'Orazio (DeJuan Alvonzo pass failed) – 37–33 LA
- 12:31 LA – Rob Turner 21 yd pass from Sonny Cumbie (Remy Hamilton kick) – 44–33 LA
- 09:12 CHI – Bob McMillen 3 yd pass from Matt D'Orazio (Dan Frantz kick failed) – 44–39 LA
- 05:20 LA – Remy Hamilton 33 yd field goal – 47–39 LA
- 04:16 CHI – Rob Mager 20 yd pass from Matt D'Orazio (Matt D'Orazio rush) – 47–47
- 00:00 LA – Remy Hamilton 29 yd field goal – 50–47 LA

Attendance: 13,142

=== Week 15: vs Grand Rapids Rampage ===
	1	2	3	4	Total
GR	0	17	0	15	32
CHI	14	34	0	7	55

at Allstate Arena, Chicago

Scoring summary:

1st Quarter:

2nd Quarter:

3rd Quarter:

4th Quarter:

=== Week 16: at Colorado Crush ===
	1	2	3	4	Total
CHI	7	28	10	21	66
COL	10	14	7	26	57

at the Pepsi Center, Denver

Scoring summary:

1st Quarter:

2nd Quarter:

3rd Quarter:

4th Quarter:

=== Week 17: vs Kansas City Brigade ===
	1	2	3	4	Total
KC	14	7	0	0	21
CHI	14	14	17	3	48

at Allstate Arena, Chicago

Scoring summary:

1st Quarter:

2nd Quarter:

3rd Quarter:

4th Quarter:

== Playoffs ==
=== Round 2: vs (4) Los Angeles Avengers ===
	1	2	3	4	Total
(4) LA	7	13	0	0	20
(2) CHI	10	21	7	14	52

at Allstate Arena, Chicago

Scoring summary:

1st Quarter:

2nd Quarter:

3rd Quarter:

4th Quarter:

=== Conference Championship: at (1) San Jose SaberCats ===
	1	2	3	4	Total
(2) CHI	7	7	14	21	49
(1) SJS	7	21	6	27	61

at HP Pavilion, San Jose, California
