= 2006 Chicago Rush season =

Arena Football League team season

- Head coach: Mike Hohensee
- Home stadium: Allstate Arena

Results
- Record: 7–9
- Division place: 3rd
- Playoffs: Won Wild Card Playoffs (Kats) 55–47; Won Divisional Playoffs (Crush) 63–46; Won Conference Championship (SaberCats) 59–56; Won ArenaBowl XX (Predators) 69–61

The 2006 Chicago Rush season was the sixth season for the franchise. They won ArenaBowl XX in 2006 with a 7–9 record. They defeated the Orlando Predators.

== Final roster ==
2006 Chicago Rush roster
Quarterbacks: 8 Asad Abdul-Khaliq; 7 Michael Bishop; 10 Matt D'Orazio; Fullbacks: 44 Bob McMillen; Wide receivers: 23 DeJuan Alfonzo; 11 Woodrow Dantzler; 14 Buchie Ibeh; 17 Etu Molden; 9 Bobby Sippio	Offensive linemen: 88 D. J. Bleisath; 65 Tango McCauley; Defensive linemen: 99 John Moyer; 58 Khreem Smith	Linebackers: Currently vacant; Defensive backs: 21 Dennison Robinson; 3 Russell Shaw; 37 Jeremy Unertl; Kickers: 4 Dan Frantz	Injured reserve: Currently vacant; Refuse to report: Currently vacant; League suspension: Currently vacant; Inactive reserve: Jason Holshoe; Recallable reassignment: Currently vacant; Other league exempt: Currently vacant; Rookies in italics Roster updated August 2, 2006; 17 Active, 1 Inactive
