= Russ Michna =

American gridiron football player (born 1981)

No. 12
- Position: Quarterback

Personal information
- Born: February 3, 1981 (age 45); Elk Grove Village, Illinois, U.S.
- Listed height: 6 ft 3 in (1.91 m)
- Listed weight: 225 lb (102 kg)

Career information
- High school: James B. Conant (Hoffman Estates, Illinois)
- College: Western Illinois
- NFL draft: 2004: undrafted

Career history
- St. Louis Rams (2004–2005)*; Winnipeg Blue Bombers (2005–2006); Chicago Rush (2007–2008); Chicago Slaughter (2009); Las Vegas Locomotives (2009–2010); Chicago Rush (2010–2012); San Jose SaberCats (2013–2014)
- * Offseason or practice squad member only

Awards and highlights
- 2× UFL champion (2009, 2010); CIFL champion (2009); CIFL MVP (2009); 2× GFC Offensive P.O.Y. (2002–2003); 2× First-team All-GFC (2002–2003)

Career CFL statistics
- Pass attempts: 56
- Pass completions: 28
- Percentage: 50
- TD–INT: 3–2
- Passing yards: 367
- Stats at CFL.ca (archived)

Career AFL statistics
- Comp. / Att.: 1,532 / 2,275
- Passing yards: 18,991
- TD–INT: 395-55
- Passer rating: 122.49
- Rushing touchdowns: 35
- Stats at ArenaFan.com

Russell Walter Michna (born February 3, 1981) is an American former professional football quarterback who played in the Arena Football League (AFL), the Canadian Football League (CFL), and the United Football League (UFL). A two-time UFL champion, he was also on the St. Louis Rams' practice squad in the National Football League (NFL). In 2009, he played in the Continental Indoor Football League (CIFL), winning the CIFL championship and league MVP honors.

== Early life ==
Michna attended James B. Conant High School in Hoffman Estates, Illinois and was a student and a letterman in football, basketball, and baseball. In football, he was an All-State selection as a senior. Russ Walter Michna graduated from James B. Conant High School in 1999.

== College career ==
Michna played college football at Western Illinois University. Michna spent his first two seasons with the Leathernecks as the backup quarterback to Sam Clemons, who guided the team to a Gateway Conference Championship in 2000. As a junior in 2002, Michna became the starter quarterback, and lead the Leathernecks to back-to-back I-AA Playoff appearances. However, Western Illinois lost to Western Kentucky and Colgate. Michna was the Gateway Conference Offensive Player of the Year in 2002 and 2003.

=== College career statistics ===
Western Illinois Leathernecks
Season	Passing							Rushing			
Season	Comp	Att	Yards	Pct.	TD	Int	QB rating	Att	Yards	Avg	TD
2000	5	8	101	62.5	0	0	168.6	4	2	0.4	0
2001	13	24	136	54.2	0	1	93.4	12	-20	-2.5	0
2002	189	330	3,037	57.3	23	5	155.1	81	130	1.6	4
2003	211	371	3,160	56.9	21	14	139.6	70	167	2.4	4
Career	418	733	6,434	57.0	44	19	145.4	167	279	1.7	8

== Professional career ==
=== St. Louis Rams ===
After going undrafted in the 2004 NFL draft, Michna signed as an undrafted free agent with the St. Louis Rams. He spent the 2004 season on the Rams' practice squad, but was released during training camp in 2005.

=== Winnipeg Blue Bombers ===
After Michna's release from the Rams, he signed with the Winnipeg Blue Bombers of the Canadian Football League. After starting quarterback Kevin Glenn suffered an injury, Michna saw game action when back-up Tee Martin was ineffective. He appeared in one game with the Blue Bombers in 2006 before he was released on August 20.

=== Chicago Rush (first stint) ===
Michna joined the Chicago Rush of the Arena Football League in 2007, after the team was coming off a victory in ArenaBowl XX. He spent the season as the team's second-string quarterback behind Matt D'Orazio and in the regular season, completed just two of three passes for 44 yards. However, a back injury hampered D'Orazio at the end of the season. Although, D'Orazio started both of the Rush playoff games, Michna saw action in each. In the opening game, the Rush took a 31-14 lead over the Los Angeles Avengers, en route to a 52-20 win. This allowed D'Orazio to rest, Michna completed all six of his passes for 73 yards. The following week, on the road against the San Jose SaberCats in the conference championship, D'Orazio started, but was ineffective with the back injury. He completed just six of 18 passes with three interceptions. The Sabercats jumped out to a 28-7 lead, and Michna came in. He went 22 of 30 for 247 yards, five touchdowns to one pick, but the Rush could not complete the comeback, and fell 61-49. It was the third time the Rush met San Jose in the AFL semifinals, and second time the team lost. San Jose would go on to win ArenaBowl XXI with a 55-33 win over the Columbus Destroyers.

In 2008, D'Orazio signed with the Philadelphia Soul, and the Rush signed AFL veteran Sherdrick Bonner, who figured to be the starter. However, Bonner got injured early in the season and Michna was named the Rush's starting quarterback. He would lead the team the rest of the way, even when Bonner got healthy. Michna finished the season with 57 touchdowns, seven interceptions and 2,721 yards on 239 completions and 351 attempts. The Rush finished the season 11-5, won the division, and for the first time in franchise history, had home field advantage for the playoffs. However, the Grand Rapids Rampage, who made the playoffs as a wild card seed with just a 6-10 record, stunned the Rush with a 58-41 upset in the Divisional Playoffs.

=== Chicago Slaughter ===
When the Arena Football League suspended operations in 2009, Michna signed with the Chicago Slaughter of the CIFL, along with other Rush players and coaches Donovan Morgan, Bobby Sippio, Dennison Robinson, DeJuan Alfonzo, and Bob McMillen. Michna led the Chicago Slaughter to an undefeated record (14-0) and a CIFL Championship. He was named the CIFL Offensive Player of the week 1 time and was named league MVP. Not only had he led the Chicago Slaughter to their first undefeated season, he had also led the Chicago Slaughter to its first championship. Michna has also broken the record for most touchdowns in a game (twice, the second time he broke his own record.)

=== Las Vegas Locomotives ===
Michna was signed by the Las Vegas Locomotives of the United Football League on August 31, 2009 and served as a back-up during the Locos championship run.

Although cut before the season began, Michna returned to the Locos in 2010 when an injury to Tim Rattay opened a slot as back-up again on the Locos' roster.

=== Chicago Rush (second stint) ===
Michna was re-signed by the Rush on January 2, 2010. He was once again the team's starting quarterback. In fourteen contests, he completed 290 of 423 passes for 3,860 yards, 70 touchdowns and 11 interceptions for a quarterback rating of 126.0. It was good enough to finish second in the league in passer rating, behind Milwaukee Iron quarterback Chris Greisen, who would sign with the Dallas Cowboys at the end of the year.

For the 2011 season, he switched his jersey number from 8 to 12, which he wore in college. Michna led the Rush to a 9-3 record before suffering an ankle injury. In 12 games, he put up 2,896 yards, 66 touchdowns, 13 interceptions and completed 236 of 354 passes for a 116.0 rating.

=== San Jose SaberCats ===
On April 22, 2013, the San Jose SaberCats announced that they have been assigned Michna on a two-year contract. San Jose also placed quarterback Aaron Garcia on recallable reassignment, and later traded him to Orlando, to make room on the 24-man roster.
