= Woodrow Dantzler =

American football player (born 1979)

No. 29, 30
- Positions: Quarterback, running back, return specialist

Personal information
- Born: October 4, 1979 (age 47); Orangeburg, South Carolina, U.S.
- Listed height: 5 ft 10 in (1.78 m)
- Listed weight: 209 lb (95 kg)

Career information
- High school: Wilkinson (Orangeburg)
- College: Clemson
- NFL draft: 2002: undrafted

Career history
- Dallas Cowboys (2002); Atlanta Falcons (2003); Dallas Cowboys (2005)*; → Frankfurt Galaxy (2005); Chicago Rush (2006–2007); Team Tennessee (2008)*; Harrisburg Stampede (2009); Greenville Force (2010)
- * Offseason or practice squad member only

Awards and highlights
- ArenaBowl champion (2006); First-team All-ACC (2001)

Career NFL statistics
- Games played: 14
- Rushing yards: 21
- Return yards: 744
- Total touchdowns: 2
- Stats at Pro Football Reference

Career AFL statistics
- Receptions: 27
- Receiving yards: 348
- Return yards: 101
- Total touchdowns: 5
- Stats at ArenaFan.com

Woodrow "Woody" Dantzler III (born October 4, 1979) is an American former professional football player who was a running back and safety in the National Football League (NFL) for the Dallas Cowboys and Atlanta Falcons. He played college football for the Clemson Tigers.

== Early life ==
Dantzler attended Orangeburg-Wilkinson High School, where he played quarterback. As a sophomore, he became a starter in the fourth game of the season, finishing with 1,761 passing yards and 17 touchdowns. As a junior, he passed for 2,461 yards, 22 touchdowns and 5 interceptions.

As a senior, he led the state with 2,891 passing yards and 21 touchdowns, while also collecting 1,628 rushing yards, 19 rushing touchdowns and 5 interceptions. He received SupePrep All-American, All-State, All-Region, All-Area, All-Area Player-of-the-Year, District Player-of-the-Year and Offensive Player-of-the-Year in the state honors. In his three-year career, he completed 507-of-791 passes (.640) for 7,113 yards, 60 passing touchdowns, 3,134 rushing yards, 35 rushing touchdowns and 11,000 all-purpose yards.

He also finished third in the state in the 400 metres competition.

== College career ==
Dantzler accepted a football scholarship from Clemson University, where he majored in Marketing. As a redshirt freshman in 1998 season, he made his first start as a quarterback in week 5 against the University of North Carolina.

In 1999 he changed his number from 11 to 1, following the graduation of Antwan Edwards. Dantzler replaced injured starter Brandon Streeter in the fourth game against the University of North Carolina, helping the team win 31–20, with a 56-yard touchdown run in the fourth quarter. He would remain as the starter for the rest of the season. Against the University of Maryland, he broke Bobby Gage's single game total offense school record, making 16 of 23 completions for 252 yards and 22 carries for 183 yards and one touchdown for a total of 435 yards. He posted 112-of-201 completions for 1,506 passing yards, 9 passing touchdowns, 6 interceptions, 723 rushing yards and 4 rushing touchdowns.

In 2000, he helped his team to a 9–3 record. Against the University of Virginia, he set an ACC rushing record by a quarterback, making runs of 75 and 45 yards, for a total of 220-yard rushing yards. He would have 4 straight games of 100 yards rushing and 300 yards of total offense, a first in NCAA history. He was on pace to become the first player in college football history to throw for 2,000 yards and run for 1,000 yards in one season until being slowed down by a left ankle injury. Against the University of South Carolina, he completed a pass to Rod Gardner in the final seconds putting Clemson in position to kick a game-winning field goal for a 16–14 win. He finished with 137-of-244 completions for 1,871 passing yards, 11 passing touchdowns, 7 interceptions, 1,028 rushing yards (ACC quarterback record) and 13 rushing touchdowns. Of those stats, 956 passing yards along with 6 touchdowns went to Gardner, who was selected in the first round of the 2001 NFL draft (15th overall).

In 2001, Dantzler rushed for 1,075 yards and 13 touchdowns. He became the first player in NCAA football history to pass for more than 2,000 yards and rush for more than 1,000 in a single season, and only the third player in NCAA history to pass for more than 5,000 yards and rush for more than 2,500 yards in his career. Against The Citadel, he set school records for completion percentage and passing efficiency, by completing 16 of 17 passes. Against ninth-ranked Georgia Tech, he contributed to a 47–44 upset, rushing for 164 yards while passing for 254 yards and scoring the game-winning touchdown in overtime with an 11-yard run. Against North Carolina State University, he tallied 517 yards of total offense (fifth-best in ACC history), completing 23 of 27 passes for 333 yards. In the season he registered 188-of-311 completions for 2,360 passing yards, 17 passing touchdowns, 11 interceptions, 206 carries for 1,004 rushing yards and 10 rushing touchdowns.

Dantzler finished his college career completing 445-of-773 passes for 5,819 yards, 37 touchdowns and 24 interceptions while rushing for 2,704 yards and 27 touchdowns on 576 carries. He held 53 school records, including being the All-time passing yards leader (5,819) and touchdown passer (37).

In 2007, he was inducted into the Clemson Athletic Hall of Fame.

== Professional career ==
=== National Football League ===
Dantzler was signed as an undrafted free agent by the Dallas Cowboys after the 2002 NFL draft on April 29, to play as a running back. He was released on September 1 and signed to the practice squad. On November 27, he was promoted to the active roster to return kickoffs. On December 8, he scored his first NFL touchdown when he returned a kickoff for 84 yards against the San Francisco 49ers.

In 2003, he was converted into a safety by new Cowboys head coach Bill Parcells. He was released on September 1.

On September 2, 2003, he was claimed off waivers by the Atlanta Falcons. He was declared inactive in 7 games. He rushed for one touchdown against the Tampa Bay Buccaneers, and had some snaps at quarterback for the first time in his NFL Career. In 2004, he was moved to wide receiver. On September 5, he was waived with an ankle injury that he suffered in the preseason finale against the Washington Redskins.

On January 26, 2005, he was signed as a free agent by the Dallas Cowboys and was allocated to the Frankfurt Galaxy of NFL Europe. He played free safety for the Galaxy making 27 tackles, 2 passes defensed, 5 special teams tackles, one forced fumble, while leading the team in kickoff returns (22) and kickoff return yards (437). After being tried as a kick returner, he was released by the Cowboys on September 3.

=== Arena Football League ===
On December 5, 2005, Dantzler was signed to a two-year contract with the Chicago Rush of the Arena Football League (AFL) to play wide receiver and defensive back. He won a championship in 2006, as the Rush defeated the Orlando Predators 69–61. Dantzler was not re-signed after the 2007 season.

=== All-American Football League ===
In 2008, Dantzler was selected and signed by Team Tennessee of the All American Football League (AAFL). He was one of five current Quarterbacks on the roster. However, his contract was terminated when the AAFL postponed its debut season for the second time.

=== American Indoor Football Association ===
In 2009, Dantzler was signed to the newly founded Harrisburg Stampede of the American Indoor Football Association. He missed the entire season after tearing the patellar tendon in his knee while playing basketball during his off time. He was released at the end of the season.

On February 12, 2010, he signed with the Greenville Force of the American Indoor Football Association.

== Personal life ==
Dantzler served as an assistant football coach at Fairfield Central High School. He was featured in HBO's Hard Knocks series as a member of the Dallas Cowboys in 2002. He resides in South Carolina with his wife Portia and two daughters.

== See also ==
- List of Arena Football League and National Football League players
