= Arena Football League Ironman of the Year =

The Arena Football League Ironman of the Year was an award given to the Arena Football League's best ironman (player playing both offense and defense) from the league's inception to 2012.

Season	Player	Team	Position
1987	Billy Stone	Chicago Bruisers	FB/LB
1988	Dwayne Dixon	Detroit Drive	WR/LB
1989	Carl Aikens, Jr.	Chicago Bruisers	WR/DB
1990	Thomas Monroe	Pittsburgh Gladiators	WR/DB
1991	Milton Barney	New Orleans Night	WR/DB
1992	Barry Wagner	Orlando Predators	WR/DB
1993	Barry Wagner (2)	Orlando Predators	WR/DB
1994	Barry Wagner (3)	Orlando Predators	WR/DB
1995	Barry Wagner (4)	Orlando Predators	WR/DB
1996	Barry Wagner (5)	Orlando Predators	WR/DB
1997	Barry Wagner (6)	Orlando Predators	WR/DB
1998	Chad Dukes	Albany Firebirds	WR/LB
1999	Hunkie Cooper	Arizona Rattlers	WR/LB
2000	Hunkie Cooper (2)	Arizona Rattlers	WR/LB
2001	Dameon Porter	Chicago Rush	WR/DB
2002	Greg Hopkins	Los Angeles Avengers	WR/LB
2003	Randy Gatewood	Arizona Rattlers	WR/DB
2004	Cory Fleming	Orlando Predators	WR/LB
2005	Kevin Ingram	Los Angeles Avengers	WR/DB
2006	Randy Gatewood (2)	Arizona Rattlers	WR/DB
2007	Will Pettis	Dallas Desperados	WR/DB
2008	Will Pettis (2)	Dallas Desperados	WR/DB
2010	DeJuan Alfonzo	Chicago Rush	WR/DB
2011	P. J. Berry	New Orleans Voodoo	WR/DB
2012	Jeff Hughley	Philadelphia Soul	WR/DB
