= Dameon Porter =

American football player (born 1975)

No. 1
- Position: Wide receiver/Defensive back

Personal information
- Born: May 21, 1975 (age 51); Los Angeles, California, U.S.
- Listed height: 6 ft 1 in (1.85 m)
- Listed weight: 180 lb (82 kg)

Career information
- High school: Crenshaw (Los Angeles)
- College: Wayne State
- NFL draft: 1998: undrafted

Career history
- Iowa Barnstormers (1998–1999); New Jersey Red Dogs (2000); Chicago Rush (2001); Detroit Fury (2002); Chicago Rush (2003); Georgia Force (2004); Austin Wranglers (2004); Las Vegas Gladiators (2005–2006); Grand Rapids Rampage (2006)

Awards and highlights
- 2× First-team All-Arena (2001, 2002); AFL Ironman of the Year Team (2001); 2× AFL All-Ironman Team (2001, 2002); AFL Breakout Player of the Year (2001)
- Stats at ArenaFan.com

Dameon Porter (born May 21, 1975) is an American former professional football wide receiver/defensive back who played in the Arena Football League (AFL).

== Early life ==
Porter first played college football at El Camino College and Palomar College. He then transferred to play at Wayne State College in Wayne, Nebraska from 1996 to 1997.

== Career ==
He played for the Iowa Barnstormers (1998–1999), the New Jersey Red Dogs (2000), the Chicago Rush (2001–2003), the Georgia Force (2004), the Austin Wranglers (2004), the Las Vegas Gladiators (2005–2006), the Grand Rapids Rampage (2006).

Porter led the Arena Football League in interceptions in back-to-back seasons from 2001 and 2002. Porter picked off 12 passes in 2001 and recorded 10 more in 2002. In Week 4 of the 2003 Arena Football League season, Porter made a clutch interception against the Los Angeles Avengers at the goal line to seal the Chicago Rush victory. The Rush entered the game 0-3 playing 3-0 Los Angeles, which gave Chicago its first win of the 2003 season while handing the Avengers their first defeat of the year.

== Awards and honors ==
He was named first-team All-Arena in 2001 and 2002. Porter was also named the AFL Breakout Player of the Year and the Ironman of the Year in 2001.
