= Jonathan Ordway =

American gridiron football player (born 1978)

No. 20
- Position: Defensive back

Personal information
- Born: October 19, 1978 (age 48); Seffner, Florida, U.S.
- Listed height: 5 ft 10 in (1.78 m)
- Listed weight: 193 lb (88 kg)

Career information
- High school: Armwood (Seffner, Florida)
- College: Boston College

Career history
- 2003–2004: Ottawa Renegades
- 2003–2006: Tampa Bay Storm
- 2007–2008: Chicago Rush
- 2009: Montreal Alouettes*
- 2009: Chicago Rush
- 2010: Tampa Bay Storm
- * Offseason or practice squad member only

Jonathan David Ordway (born October 19, 1978]) is an American former professional football defensive back. He was a member of the Tampa Bay Storm, Ottawa Renegades, Chicago Rush and Montreal Alouettes in the Canadian Football League. Ordway attended Boston College.

Ordway was named All-County and All-Conference as a senior running back at Armwood High School in Seffner, Florida.
