= Kelvin Morris =

American gridiron football player (born 1982)

Profile
- Position: Linebacker

Personal information
- Born: October 25, 1982 (age 44); Timmonsville, South Carolina, U.S.
- Listed height: 6 ft 4 in (1.93 m)
- Listed weight: 245 lb (111 kg)

Career information
- High school: Timmonsville (SC)
- College: West Georgia
- NFL draft: 2006: undrafted

Career history
- Spokane Shock (2007); Utah Blaze (2008); Calgary Stampeders (2009)*; Arizona Rattlers (2010); Chicago Rush (2011–2012); Jacksonville Sharks (2013)*; Chicago Rush (2013); Jacksonville Sharks (2014)*
- * Offseason or practice squad member only

Awards and highlights
- GSC Defensive Player of the Year (2005); First-team All-Arena (2011)

Career AFL statistics
- Tackles: 188
- Sacks: 2
- Forced fumbles: 4
- Interceptions: 23
- Stats at ArenaFan.com

Kelvin Morris (born October 25, 1982) is an American former football linebacker and current free agent. He was signed by the Spokane Shock as a street free agent in 2007. He played college football at West Georgia, arena football for the Utah Blaze and Canadian football for the Calgary Stampeders.

== College career ==
Morris began his college career at Southwest Mississippi Community College, where he played football for two seasons. He signed a letter of intent to join the Clemson Tigers football team in 2002. He appeared as a reserve for the Tigers, and after tearing his anterior cruciate ligament and being declared academically ineligible, he transferred out of Clemson. His final college football season was at the University of West Georgia, where he won the Gulf South Conference Defensive Player of the Year award in 2005.

== Professional career ==
=== Arena Football League ===
Morris began his Arena Football League career with the Utah Blaze in 2008. That season, he recorded 51 tackles, 12 broken up passes, and two interceptions, returning one for a touchdown and recovering six fumbles.

In 2010, Morris signed with the Arizona Rattlers. He had 27 tackles and five interceptions.

Kelvin signed with the Chicago Rush for the 2011 and 2012 seasons. In 2013, he signed with the Orlando Predators. On March 13, 2013, Kelvin was traded back to the Chicago Rush.

Morris was assigned to the Jacksonville Sharks in 2004, but was placed on reassignment before the season began.
