= Khreem Smith =

Jamaican gridiron football player (born 1979)

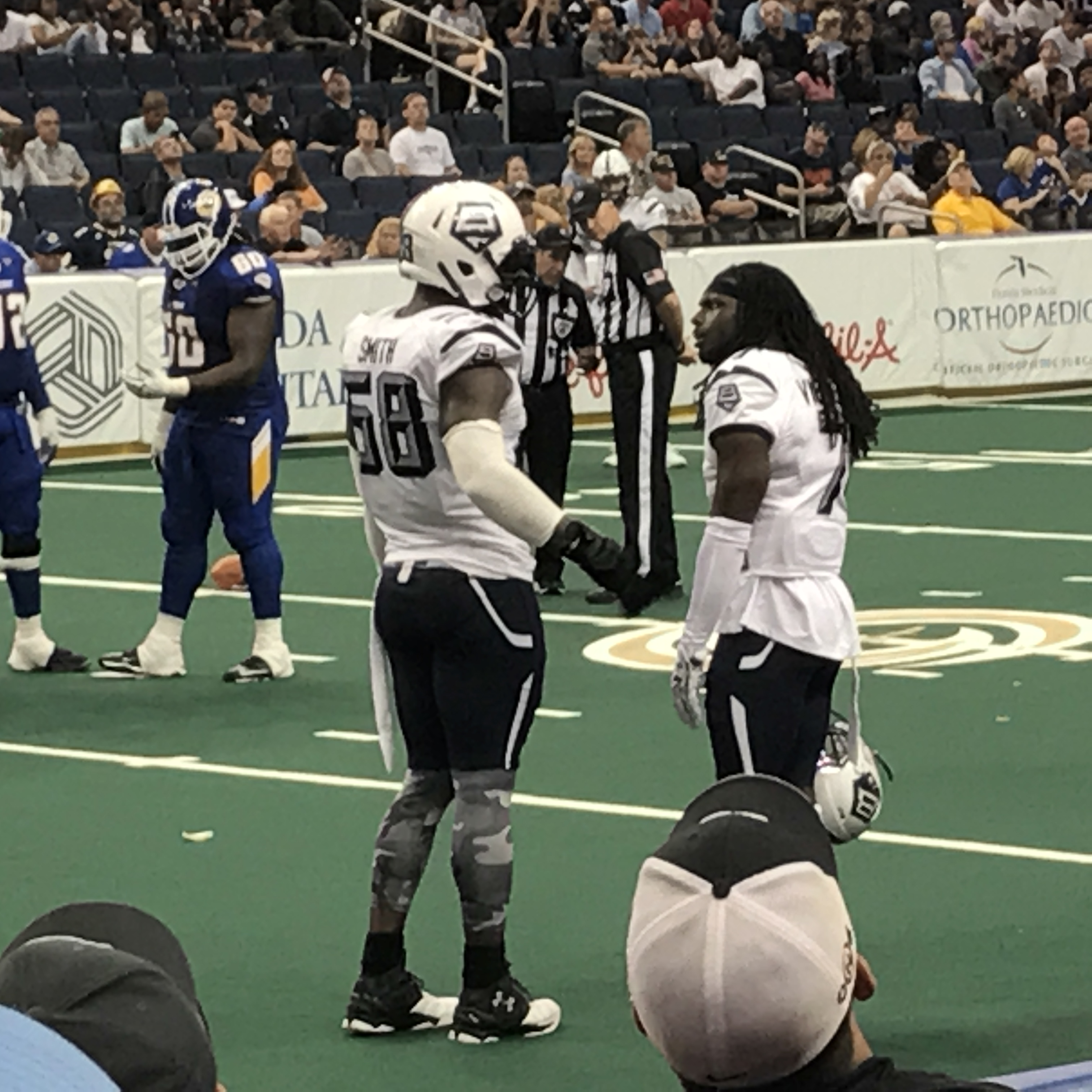
- Smith (#58) talking with Josh Victorian in 2017

No. 90, 72, 58
- Position: Defensive lineman

Personal information
- Born: July 7, 1979 (age 47); St. James, Jamaica
- Listed height: 6 ft 3 in (1.91 m)
- Listed weight: 270 lb (122 kg)

Career information
- High school: Miami Gardens (FL) Carol City
- College: Oklahoma State
- NFL draft: 2004: undrafted

Career history
- Baltimore Ravens (2004)*; Memphis Xplorers (2005); Chicago Rush (2006); Minnesota Vikings (2006); Kansas City Chiefs (2007); Chicago Rush (2008); Chicago Slaughter (2009); Milwaukee Iron (2010); Spokane Shock (2011); Utah Blaze (2011); BC Lions (2011–2015); Jacksonville Sharks (2016); Baltimore Brigade (2017); Washington Valor (2018); Columbus Destroyers (2019)
- * Offseason or practice squad member only

Awards and highlights
- Grey Cup champion (2011); 2× ArenaBowl champion (2006, 2018); ArenaCup champion (2005); 2× First-team All-Arena (2010, 2017); Second-team All-Arena (2006); AFL Defensive Lineman of the Year (2017); AFL All-Rookie (2006); af2 Lineman of the Year (2005); Second-team All-Big 12 (2003)

Career NFL statistics
- Total tackles: 1
- Stats at Pro Football Reference
- Stats at CFL.ca (archive)

Khreem Smith (born July 7, 1979) is a former professional gridiron football defensive lineman who played in the National Football League (NFL), Canadian Football League (CFL), and Arena Football League (AFL). He was signed by the Baltimore Ravens as an undrafted free agent in 2004. He played college football at Oklahoma State.

== Professional career ==
=== NFL ===
Smith went undrafted in the 2004 NFL draft. However, he attended the Baltimore Ravens training camp in 2004.

=== Arena Football League ===
Smith played for the Memphis Xplorers of AF2 in 2005 and the Chicago Rush of the Arena Football League in 2006. He helped the Xplorers win ArenaCup V, and the Rush win ArenaBowl XX. Smith recorded 22.5 tackles, eight sacks, six forced fumbles, two passes breakups and one blocked kick in 2006. His eight sacks were the third-highest single-season total in team history, behind John Moyer’s 10 sacks in 2004 and 9 in 2003. Smith led the AFL in forced fumbles and was second in the league in sacks, garnering Second-team All-Arena and All-Rookie team recognition.

=== NFL (II) ===
Smith signed with the Minnesota Vikings immediately after winning ArenaBowl XX in June 2006,. He began the regular season on the practice squad, and was elevated to the active roster late in the 2006 NFL season. In 2007, Smith was released by the Vikings in training camp and signed to the Kansas City Chiefs practice squad. He was elevated to the active roster on December 5 and finished the season there. On February 13, 2008, he was placed on waivers.

=== Arena Football League (II) ===
Smith returned to the AFL and spent the 2008 season as a member of the Chicago Rush.

=== Continental Indoor Football League ===
On February 27, 2009, the Chicago Slaughter of the Continental Indoor Football League announced the signing of Khreem Smith.

=== Arena Football League (III) ===
Smith returned to the Arena Football League for the third time after one season in the Continental Indoor Football League. He spent the 2010 season with the Milwaukee Iron and the 2011 season with the Spokane Shock before being traded to the Utah Blaze with Antonio Narcisse for Erik Meyer and Raymond McNeil.

=== Canadian Football League ===
After spending 8 years on 9 different teams in the United States, Smith signed with BC Lions of the Canadian Football League. Smith won the 99th Grey Cup to conclude his first season in the CFL. In his first two seasons in the CFL, Smith recorded 47 tackles and 12 sacks with 2 forced fumbles. On February 28, 2013, the Lions signed Smith to a contract extension.

=== Arena Football League (IV) ===
On March 14, 2016, Smith was assigned to the Jacksonville Sharks.

On January 19, 2017, he was assigned to the Baltimore Brigade. He earned AFL Defensive Lineman of the Year and First-team All-Arena honors in 2017.

On April 4, 2018, Smith was assigned to the Washington Valor. He was a major force on the defensive line, helping the Valor win ArenaBowl XXXI.

On March 5, 2019, Smith was assigned to the Columbus Destroyers.

== Personal life ==
During the off-season Smith is an elementary school teacher (grades 1 to 4)
