= 2006 Orlando Predators season =

Arena Football League team season

- Head coach: Jay Gruden
- Home stadium: Hummer Field at Amway Arena

Results
- Record: 10–6
- Division place: 1st
- Playoffs: Arenabowl Runner Up

The 2006 Orlando Predators season was the 16th season for the franchise. They lost the Arenabowl against the Chicago Rush.

== Coaching ==
Jay Gruden started his third season as head coach of the Predators. He had also coached for four years from 1998–2001.
