= Antonio Chatman =

American football player (born 1979)

No. 83
- Position: Wide receiver / Punt returner

Personal information
- Born: February 12, 1979 (age 47); Jackson, Alabama, U.S.
- Listed height: 5 ft 8 in (1.73 m)
- Listed weight: 182 lb (83 kg)

Career information
- High school: Susan Miller Dorsey (Los Angeles, California)
- College: Cincinnati
- NFL draft: 2002: undrafted

Career history
- San Francisco 49ers (2002)*; Chicago Rush (2002–2003); Green Bay Packers (2003–2005); Cincinnati Bengals (2006–2009); Sacramento Mountain Lions (2010)
- * Offseason or practice squad member only

Awards and highlights
- Second-team All-Arena (2003)

Career NFL statistics
- Receptions: 114
- Receiving yards: 1,160
- Receiving touchdowns: 6
- Return yards: 2,809
- Return touchdowns: 1
- Stats at Pro Football Reference

Antonio Tavaras Chatman (born February 12, 1979) is an American former professional football player who was a wide receiver and punt returner in the National Football League (NFL). He played college football for the Cincinnati Bearcats and was signed by the San Francisco 49ers as an undrafted free agent in 2002.

Chatman also played for the Chicago Rush, Green Bay Packers and Cincinnati Bengals.

== College career ==
Chatman was born in Jackson, Alabama and attended the Susan Miller Dorsey High School in Los Angeles, California. He attended El Camino College and the University of Cincinnati where he was a Criminology major.

== Professional career ==
=== San Francisco 49ers ===
Chatman signed as an undrafted free agent with the San Francisco 49ers of the NFL but was soon released.

=== Chicago Rush ===
He then joined the Chicago Rush of the AFL in 2002. After two weeks on the bench behind offensive specialist Joe Douglass, a freak season-ending injury to Douglass during pre-game warmups pushed Chatman into the starting job in Week 3, and he responded with a strong rookie season, leading the Rush in receiving with 74 catches for 1,068 yards and 23 touchdowns, and earning AFL All-Rookie Team honors in the process. He followed that campaign with an even better season in 2003, catching 123 passes for 1,636 yards and 29 touchdowns, and added 2,062 yards and 7 touchdowns on kick returns to set an AFL record for all-purpose yardage. Chatman was named to the All-Arena Second-team and was a runner-up for the league's Offensive Player of the Year award.

=== Green Bay Packers ===
His success in Chicago attracted the attention of the NFL's Green Bay Packers, and he signed with that team for the 2003 season.

Upon joining the Green Bay Packers, Chatman was largely relegated to a kick returning role, seeing only sparing action as a wide receiver his first season. In 2004, he gradually saw an increased role in the offense at receiver, before finally seeing extensive action as a starter in 2005 due to injuries to Javon Walker and Robert Ferguson. In his second to last game with the Packers, Chatman returned a punt 85 yards for a touchdown. It was the first punt returned for touchdown for the Packers since Allen Rossum did it in 2001.

=== Cincinnati Bengals ===
Chatman signed with the Cincinnati Bengals prior to the 2006 NFL season. However, in 2006 he missed several of the Bengals early games due to injury, and eventually was put on injured reserve. On September 7, 2007, the Bengals cut him but re-signed him a few days later for the 2007 season. On February 26, 2008, the Bengals reached a new two-year agreement with Chatman. On November 16, 2008, Chatman suffered a cervical injury in a game against the Philadelphia Eagles.

Chatman was released on November 17, 2009, with an injury settlement after being placed on injured reserve earlier in the year.

=== Sacramento Mountain Lions ===
Chatman was selected with the third pick of the sixth round and 28th selection overall in the 2010 UFL draft by the Sacramento Mountain Lions on June 4, 2010, re-uniting him with former Cincinnati Bengals teammates Chris Perry and Doug Gabriel.

== NFL career statistics ==
=== Regular season ===
Year	Team	Games		Receiving					Fumbles	
Year	Team	GP	GS	Rec	Yds	Avg	Lng	TD	FUM	Lost
2003	GB	16	0	0	0	0.0	0	0	0	0
Total				304	4,583	15.1	67	28	0	0

== Personal ==
Chatman is married to his wife Minisha; the couple has two children, Deyja and Keyonn.

In 2025, Chatman was inducted into El Camino College's athletic hall of fame.
