= Matt D'Orazio =

American gridiron football player (born 1976)

No. 2, 10
- Position: Quarterback

Personal information
- Born: October 1, 1976 (age 50); Elyria, Ohio, U.S.
- Listed height: 6 ft 4 in (1.93 m)
- Listed weight: 230 lb (104 kg)

Career information
- High school: St. Francis DeSales (Columbus, Ohio)
- College: Otterbein
- NFL draft: 2000: undrafted

Career history
- Milwaukee Mustangs (2000); New Jersey Gladiators (2001)*; Roanoke Steam (2001); Rochester Brigade (2002); Buffalo Destroyers (2003)*; Mohegan Wolves (2003); Columbus Destroyers (2004–2005); Chicago Rush (2006–2007); Philadelphia Soul (2008); Calgary Stampeders (2009)*
- * Offseason or practice squad member only

Awards and highlights
- 2× ArenaBowl champion (2006, 2008); 2× ArenaBowl MVP (2006, 2008); First-team All-Arena (2008)

Career AFL statistics
- Comp. / Att.: 1,165 / 1,687
- Passing yards: 12,972
- TD–INT: 257–26
- QB rating: 123.33
- Rushing TD: 41
- Stats at ArenaFan.com
- Stats at CFL.ca (archive)

Matthew Louis D’Orazio (born October 1, 1976) is an American former professional football quarterback who played in the Arena Football League (AFL). He played college football at Otterbein College.

D'Orazio was a member of the Roanoke Steam, Rochester Brigade, Buffalo/Columbus Destroyers, Mohegan Wolves, Chicago Rush, Philadelphia Soul and Calgary Stampeders. He was named the MVP of ArenaBowl XX. He was also named the 2008 AFL MVP, as well as the ArenaBowl XXII MVP, both in the same season.

== Early life ==
D'Orazio attended St. Francis DeSales High School in Columbus, Ohio, and lettered in football and basketball. In football, he was an All-State selection, and in basketball, he was an All-Conference selection. His #10 jersey was retired by the school.

== College career ==
D'Orazio originally attended Youngstown State University where he red-shirted in 1995 and played in one game in 1996. He then transferred to Otterbein College, where he then set school single-season and career records for passing yards, touchdown passes and total offense. While there, he passed for 8,770 yards and 73 touchdowns while rushing for 594 yards and five touchdowns during his career. In 2012, D'Orazio was inducted into the Otterbein Athletic Hall of Fame.

== Professional career ==
D'Orazio entered the Arena Football League in 2000, when he signed with the Milwaukee Mustangs, where he only spent one season. He was placed on recallable waivers by the Mustangs on January 25, 2001.

Then on March 8, 2001, he signed with the New Jersey Gladiators. He was placed on recallable waivers by the Gladiators on April 9, 2001.

In 2001, D'Orazio played for the Roanoke Steam of the AFL's minor league af2.

In 2002, D'Orazio signed with the Rochester Brigade of the af2. For the season, he went 324-of-522, for 3,372 passing yards, 51 touchdowns, and 13 interceptions. He also rushed for 332 yards and 20 touchdowns, an af2 alltime record.

In 2003, D'Orazio returned to the AFL, signing with the Buffalo Destroyers' practice squad on February 19, 2003. He was released by the Destroyers on April 9, 2003.

D'Orazio played for the Mohegan Wolves of the af2 in 2003.

He signed with the Columbus Destroyers on November 18, 2003, and played for the team until 2005.

On November 3, 2005, he signed a two-year contract with the Chicago Rush. At the end of the 2006 season, he led the league as the top-rated passer (126.2), and the top rusher with 200 yards and 10 touchdowns. In ArenaBowl XX, he threw for 250 yards and six touchdowns, as well as rushing for two. He was named Offensive Player of the Game and game MVP for his performance. In the off-season following the 2007 season, D'Orazio was released by the Rush on November 7, 2007. The team did not want to wait until January to make a call on whether to keep him following his 2007 back injury during the playoffs. He was replaced by former Arizona Rattlers quarterback Sherdrick Bonner.

In 2008, D'Orazio signed with the Philadelphia Soul as a backup to Tony Graziani. D'Orazio became the starting quarterback after Graziani suffered a season-ending injury. D'Orazio was named first-team All-Arena and the Champs Sports Quarterback of the Year for the 2008 season while leading Philadelphia to ArenaBowl XXII, where they defeated the San Jose SaberCats 59–56. He was named MVP of the game. Along with George LaFrance, D'Orazio is one of only two players to be named MVP of the ArenaBowl while playing for two different teams.

On February 13, 2009, the Calgary Stampeders of the Canadian Football League signed D'Orazio. He was released on June 25, 2009.

=== AFL statistics ===
Legend
	ArenaBowl MVP
	Won the ArenaBowl
	Led the league
**Bold**	Career high

Year	Team	Passing							Rushing		
Year	Team	Cmp	Att	Pct	Yds	TD	Int	Rtg	Att	Yds	TD
2000	Milwaukee	1	2	50.0	40	0	1	56.25	0	0	0
2005	Columbus	205	324	63.3	2,246	40	6	106.84	50	178	8
2006	Chicago	305	434	70.3	3,552	63	5	126.24	56	200	10
2007	Chicago	**353**	**511**	69.1	**3,803**	**82**	**10**	122.09	**61**	127	**12**
2008	Philadelphia	301	416	**72.4**	3,331	72	4	**131.32**	56	**224**	11
Career		1,165	1,687	69.1	12,972	257	26	123.33	223	729	41
