= Jeremy Unertl =

American gridiron football player (born 1978)

No. 37
- Position: Safety

Personal information
- Born: September 15, 1978 (age 48); Hartford, Wisconsin, U.S.
- Listed height: 6 ft 1 in (1.85 m)
- Listed weight: 210 lb (95 kg)

Career information
- High school: Lomira
- College: Wisconsin–La Crosse
- NFL draft: 2002: undrafted

Career history
- Green Bay Packers (2002)*; Baltimore Ravens (2002)*; Green Bay Packers (2003)*; Las Vegas Gladiators (2004–2005); Columbus Destroyers (2005–2006); Chicago Rush (2006–2008); California Redwoods (2009)*; Toronto Argonauts (2010–2011)
- * Offseason or practice squad member only

Awards and highlights
- World Bowl champion (2003); ArenaBowl champion (2006); Second-team All-Arena (2007)

Career AFL statistics
- Total tackles: 331
- Pass deflections: 55
- Interceptions: 21
- Defensive touchdowns: 3
- Stats at ArenaFan.com

Jeremy Dale Unertl (born September 15, 1978) is a former gridiron football safety. He was signed by the Green Bay Packers as an undrafted free agent in 2002. He had a 10-year professional career in multiple leagues. He played college football at Wisconsin–La Crosse. Unertl was also a member of the Baltimore Ravens, Las Vegas Gladiators, Columbus Destroyers, Chicago Rush, California Redwoods, and Toronto Argonauts.

== Professional career ==
=== First stint with Packers ===
After going undrafted in the 2002 NFL draft, Unertl was signed by the Green Bay Packers as an undrafted free agent.

=== Baltimore Ravens ===
Unertl was signed by the Baltimore Ravens on August 12, but released at the end of training camp.

=== Second stint with Packers ===
Unertl was re-signed by the Green Bay Packers in the 2003 offseason and was allocated to NFL Europe, where he played for the Frankfurt Galaxy. While with the Galaxy Unertl led NFL Europe in interceptions and won World Bowl XI as a starting cornerback. He was released by the Packers on August 29.

=== Las Vegas Gladiators ===
Unertl then signed with the Las Vegas Gladiators in 2004, but was released during the 2005 season.

=== Columbus Destroyers ===
Unertl was claimed off waivers by the Columbus Destroyers in 2005. In 2006, he was traded to the Chicago Rush after week 2 for Henry Douglas.

=== Chicago Rush ===
Unertl immediately became the Rush's starting Defensive Specialist and had a breakout season. He helped Chicago to a three-game winning streak and was named defensive player of the game in all three games. He finished the season as the team's MVP, finishing the year as the Rush's leader in tackles, interceptions, and pass breakups.

=== California Redwoods ===
Unertl was drafted by the California Redwoods of the United Football League in the UFL Premiere Season Draft in 2009. He signed with the team on August 18.

=== Toronto Argonauts ===
On April 6, 2010, Unertl signed with the Toronto Argonauts of the Canadian Football League.

== Personal life ==
Unertl married Kasie Cantor on May 11, 2012, in Las Vegas, Nevada.
