= Dan Frantz =

American football player (born 1977)

No. 13, 4
- Position: Kicker

Personal information
- Born: July 9, 1977 (age 49); Vancouver, Washington, U.S.
- Listed height: 6 ft 1 in (1.85 m)
- Listed weight: 200 lb (91 kg)

Career information
- High school: Columbia River (WA)
- College: Portland State

Career history
- Washington Redskins (2002)*; San Jose SaberCats (2004–2005); Chicago Rush (2006–2007); Orlando Predators (2008); Chicago Rush (2008, 2013)
- * Offseason or practice squad member only

Awards and highlights
- 2× ArenaBowl champion (2004, 2006)

Career AFL statistics
- FGM: 35
- FGA: 79
- Percent: 44%
- PAT made: 463
- PAT att: 526
- Stats at ArenaFan.com

Daniel Lee Frantz (born July 9, 1977) is an American former professional football kicker who played in the Arena Football League for the San Jose SaberCats, Chicago Rush, and Orlando Predators.

== Early life ==
Frantz attended Columbia River High School in Vancouver, Washington and played football, soccer, basketball, and track and field.

== College career ==
He played football collegiately at Portland State University.

== Professional career ==
Frantz signed with the Washington Redskins of the National Football League in 2002 but was released before the final preseason game.

He was released by the Chicago Rush on June 3, 2008.
