= Bob McMillen (American football) =

American football player and coach (born 1970)

No. 44
- Positions: Fullback, linebacker

Personal information
- Born: October 28, 1970 (age 56); Oak Park, Illinois, U.S.
- Listed height: 6 ft 2 in (1.88 m)
- Listed weight: 254 lb (115 kg)

Career information
- High school: Immaculate Conception (IL)
- College: Illinois-Benedictine

Career history

Playing
- Arizona Rattlers (1995–2000); San Jose SaberCats (2001–2002); Chicago Rush (2003–2007)

Coaching
- Chicago Rush (2008) Fullback/linebackers coach; Chicago Slaughter (2009) Assistant; Chicago Rush (2010) Assistant head coach; Chicago Rush (2011–2013) Head coach; Los Angeles Kiss (2014–2015) Head coach

Awards and highlights
- 3× ArenaBowl champion (1997, 2002, 2006); First-team All-Arena (2000); Second-team All-Arena (1999); AFL All-Ironman Team (2004); First-team AFL 15th Anniversary Team (2001); Many arena football records; Arena Football Hall of Fame inductee (2013); AFL Coach of the Year (2013); 3× All-American

Career AFL statistics
- Rushing yards: 1,514
- Rushing TDs: 85
- Receiving yards: 810
- Receiving TDs: 10
- Stats at ArenaFan.com

Head coaching record
- Regular season: 40–50 (.444)
- Postseason: 1–2 (.333)
- Career: 41–52 (.441)

Robert James McMillen, Jr. (born October 28, 1970) is an American former professional football fullback/linebacker and coach in the Arena Football League (AFL). He played college football at Illinois-Benedictine, and was an AFL fullback/linebacker from 1995 to 2007. He was on the cover of the 2007 video game Arena Football: Road to Glory. McMillen began coaching the sport in 2008, first serving as an assistant for the Chicago Rush before being named head coach of the Rush in 2011. In 2013, McMillen was elected into the Arena Football Hall of Fame. He was the head coach of the Los Angeles Kiss from 2014 to 2015.

== Early life ==
McMillen attended Immaculate Conception High School, which is now called IC Catholic Prep, where he lettered in football, basketball, and baseball. After high school, he attended the College of DuPage in Glen Ellyn, Illinois where he played football. He then transferred to Illinois-Benedictine where he majored in Sport management and he was a three-time All-America selection in football. He also earned All-Conference honors in football and baseball and won the Conference Player of the Year award in football.

== Professional playing career ==
=== Arizona Rattlers (1995–2000) ===
As a rookie in 1995, McMillen played in all 16 games for the Arizona Rattlers of the Arena Football League, making his debut May 12 in a road game against the San Jose SaberCats. He was the Rattlers' First-leading rusher, carrying the ball 135 times for 378 yards and two receptions for 15 yards and one touchdown. He scored all five of his rushing touchdowns in the first four weeks of the season. On defense, he recorded 24.5 tackles and one interception.

In 1996, McMillen only played in one game. In his only game of the season, he recorded nine carries for 30 yards and two touchdowns against the Orlando Predators before tearing the ACL in his right knee.

In 1997 he returned from his torn ACL to play in 13 games for the Rattlers. He recorded 70 rushing yards and two touchdowns on offense while recording 13 tackles and one interception on defense. The Rattlers beat the Iowa Barnstormers 55-33 to win ArenaBowl XI.

In 1998, he played in just five games, recording 12 carries for 40 yards. He also recorded the first sack of his career May 9, on the road against the San Jose. However, his season was cut short due to a torn ACL in his left knee against the Florida Firecats.

In 1999, McMillen returned and played in 11 games and led the league in rushing with 180 yards, he also scored eight rushing touchdowns. He was a Second-team All-Arena selection for his performance. He also led the Rattlers with 2.5 sacks. He scored 11 total touchdowns for the season.

In 2000, he played in 14 games. For the season, he led the team in rushing attempts, yards (143), sacks and fumble recoveries (4). His 143 rushing yards were the ninth-best in the league. He also recorded a career-high five sacks. He also earned First-team All-Arena honors.

=== San Jose SaberCats (2001–2002) ===
Before the 2001 season, McMillen signed with the team he made his professional debut against, the San Jose SaberCats. In his first season with the SaberCats, he played in 12 games. He carried the ball 31 times for 123 yards, ninth best in the league. He missed two games in early June due to an injured ankle.

In 2002 he played in 11 games, rushing for 101 yards and seven touchdowns and recorded 17 tackles on defenses. In his final game with the SaberCats, the team won their first, his second, ArenaBowl in ArenaBowl XVI.

=== Chicago Rush (2003–2008) ===
McMillen signed a three-year deal with the Chicago Rush on November 14, 2002. He played in all 16 games for the Rush, his first full season as a professional. He made his Rush debut on February 2 against the Orlando Predators and recorded four tackles and one sack. For the season he recorded a career-high 27 tackles and rushed for 113 yards and recorded eight receptions. He also recorded one sack, one interception. It was the fifth straight season that he has rushed for over 100 yards.

In 2004, McMillen became the first player in AFL history to rush for 100 or more yards in six-consecutive seasons after he recorded a career-high 285 rushing yards. He also recorded a league-leading 22 touchdowns - the second highest single-season total in league history. He finished the season second in the league in rushing and recorded 25 tackles and one sack on defense. For his performance, he was selected to the league’s All-Ironman team. He also became only the fifth player in league history to rush for 1,000 career yards. After the season, on November 1, he signed a one-year contract extension.

In 2005, McMillen played in all 16 games. He rushed for 178 yards and nine touchdowns and career-highs with 14 receptions for 126 yards on offense. On defense, he recorded 20.0 tackles, one sack and a career-high eight passes broken up. He moved into second place on the league's all-time rushing list on March 20 against the New Orleans VooDoo when he rushed for 10 yards in the game.

The 2006 season was the first since 1998 in which McMillen rushed for less than 100 yards. He carried the ball 37 times for 89 yards and six touchdowns, he also recorded seven receptions for 36 yards on offense. On defense, he recorded 10 tackles and 1.5 sacks. That season, he also appeared on the cover of EA Sports Arena Football: Road to Glory.

In his final season, in 2007, he carried the ball 35 times for 86 yards and five touchdowns, he also recorded nine receptions for 84 yards and one touchdown on offense. On defense, he recorded three tackles.

In April 2011, the Rush retired McMillen's #44 jersey.

=== Career summary ===
McMillen finished his career as the league's second all-time leading rusher with 1,514 career yards. He also ranked second in league history in rushing attempts (484) and fifth in rushing touchdowns (85). He is one of only two players in league history to win an ArenaBowl championship with three different teams. He was also named one of the league's 20 Greatest Players. On August 10, 2013, the Arena Football League announced that he was elected into the AFL Hall of Fame.

== Professional coaching career ==
=== Chicago Rush ===
In August 2007, after retiring as a player, McMillen was hired by the Chicago Rush as a Fullback / Linebackers coach. He spent the 2008 AFL season as the Rush's assistant coach.

When the Arena Football League ceased operations after the 2008 season, McMillen along with other Rush players moved over to the Chicago Slaughter. For 2009, McMillen was an assistant coach for the Slaughter, and he returned to the Rush when the AFL returned in 2010 as Chicago's assistant head coach.

On September 14, 2010, the Chicago Rush officially announced that McMillen would succeed Mike Hohensee as the team's head coach. McMillen becomes the Rush's second head coach in team history.

On August 15, 2013, McMillen was named Head Coach of the Year.

=== Los Angeles Kiss ===
McMillen was named the head coach of the Los Angeles Kiss on September 17, 2013.

==== Coaching record ====
Team	Year	Regular season				Postseason			
Team	Year	Won	Lost	Win %	Finish	Won	Lost	Win %	Result
CHI	2011	13	5	.722	1st in NC Central	1	1	.500	Lost to Arizona Rattlers in Conference Championship
CHI	2012	10	8	.556	2nd in NC Central	–	–	–	–
CHI	2013	10	8	.556	1st in NC Central	0	1	.000	Lost to Spokane Shock in Conference Semifinals
CHI total		33	21	.611	–	1	2	.333	
LA	2014	3	15	.167	3rd in NC West	–	–	–	–
LA	2015	4	14	.222	3rd in NC West	–	–	–	–
LA total		7	29	.194	–	–	–	–	
Total		40	50	.444		1	2	.333	
