= Bobby Sippio =

American football player (born 1980)

No. 3, 9, 8, 83, 4
- Position: Wide receiver

Personal information
- Born: December 4, 1980 (age 45); Orlando, Florida, U.S.
- Listed height: 6 ft 3 in (1.91 m)
- Listed weight: 215 lb (98 kg)

Career information
- College: Western Kentucky
- NFL draft: 2002: undrafted

Career history
- Peoria Pirates (2002); Greensboro Prowlers (2004); Dallas Desperados (2004); Miami Dolphins (2004)*; Dallas Desperados (2005); Tampa Bay Storm (2006); Chicago Rush (2006–2007); Kansas City Chiefs (2007); Chicago Slaughter (2009); Detroit Lions (2009)*; California Redwoods (2009)*; Florida Tuskers (2009); Orlando Predators (2010–2012)
- * Offseason or practice squad member only

Awards and highlights
- ArenaBowl champion (2006); First-team All-Arena (2007); af2 Ironman of the Year (2003); Division I-AA All-American (2000); All-OVC (1999)

Career AFL statistics
- Receptions: 350
- Receiving yards: 5,097
- Receiving touchdowns: 140
- Stats at ArenaFan.com
- Stats at Pro Football Reference

Robert Lee Sippio Jr. (born December 4, 1980) is an American former professional football player who was a wide receiver in the National Football League (NFL). He was signed by the Peoria Pirates in 2002. He played college football for the Western Kentucky Hilltoppers. During Sippio's professional career, he played for thirteen different teams in four different leagues, including the NFL's Miami Dolphins, Kansas City Chiefs, and Detroit Lions.

== College career ==
Sippio played college football at Western Kentucky for three seasons. He attended Osceola High School in Kissimmee, Florida where he played football and basketball. He played cornerback along with former NFL player Brett Williams.

== Professional career ==
=== af2 ===
Sippio began playing professional football in 2002 with the Peoria Pirates of af2 and then the Greensboro Prowlers, before signing with the Arena Football League.

=== Dallas Desperados ===
Sippio played in 15 games as a rookie with the Dallas Desperados, recording 75 receptions for 1,217 yards and 32 touchdowns, and recording 25.0 tackles, two interceptions and three passes broken up. He made his Arena Football League debut February 8 vs. the Carolina Cobras, catching four passes for 78 yards and two touchdowns. He was named co-Offensive Player of the Game March 6 against the Grand Rapids Rampage after catching 6 passes for 116 yards and three touchdowns.

Sippio played in 16 games in his second season with Dallas, recording 61 receptions for 863 yards and 22 touchdowns and added 30.5 tackles, two interceptions and nine passes broken up. He scored touchdowns in five different ways during the season, receiving, rushing, interception return, fumble return and kickoff return.

=== Tampa Bay Storm ===
Sippio played in nine games for the Tampa Bay Storm, recording 55 receptions for 666 yards and 18 touchdowns, before being released March 28 and claimed by the Chicago Rush on March 29.

=== Chicago Rush ===
After signing with Chicago, Sippio changed positions from WR/DB to OS. He finished the 2006 season with 93 receptions for 1,320 yards and 35 touchdowns. He recorded a season high 10 receptions for 136 yards and two touchdowns against the Orlando Predators on February 19. He also led the league with 53 touchdowns.

=== Kansas City Chiefs ===
After the 2007 Arena Football League season, Sippio signed with the Kansas City Chiefs on August 12, 2007. His signing appeared on HBO's Hard Knocks, a program showcasing NFL training camps. On September 1, 2007, the Chiefs made their final cuts to 53, and Sippio made the final roster. However, he was released on September 2 to make room for Tyler Thigpen. The following day, Sippio was added to the Chiefs practice squad. He was signed to the active roster on September 11, 2007, to replace Eddie Kennison who suffered a hamstring injury.

Sippio was released by the Chiefs on August 30, 2008.

=== Chicago Slaughter ===
On May 13, 2009, due to the injury of leading wide receiver Donovan Morgan, the Chicago Slaughter of the Continental Indoor Football League signed Sippio. The Arena Football League halted operations for the 2009 season, preventing Sippio from re-signing with the Rush or any other AFL team.

=== California Redwoods ===
Sippio signed with the California Redwoods of the United Football League in 2009, but was released in August so he could sign with the Detroit Lions.

=== Detroit Lions ===
Sippio was signed by the Detroit Lions on August 7, 2009, after offensive lineman Damion Cook was placed on injured reserve. He was waived on August 17 when the team signed wide receiver Dane Looker.

=== Florida Tuskers ===
Sippio was signed by the Florida Tuskers of the United Football League on November 16, 2009. He played for then-head coach Jay Gruden.

=== Orlando Predators ===
Sippio signed with the Predators on April 13, 2010. Sippio scored 6 TDs (4 receiving, 2 rushing), including a game-winner with just 8.7 seconds remaining, in Orlando's 73–69 victory over #1 seed Jacksonville in the first round of the 2010 Arena Football Playoffs.

== Legal trouble ==
On May 25, 2012, Bobby Sippio was arrested and charged with attempted murder, armed robbery, aggravated battery, and kidnapping over an incident involving his girlfriend's brother. Sippio and a friend allegedly arrived at the man's apartment under the pretense of helping to move furniture, but instead they forced him into a vehicle at gunpoint, drove to an unpopulated area, then proceeded to beat and threaten the man before eventually returning him home. The man, Sergio Moore, suffered a broken nose, swollen left hand and wrist, and cuts to the head and cheek. All charges were dropped on September 12, 2016.

== See also ==
- List of Arena Football League and National Football League players
