= Mike Hohensee =

American football player and coach (born 1961)

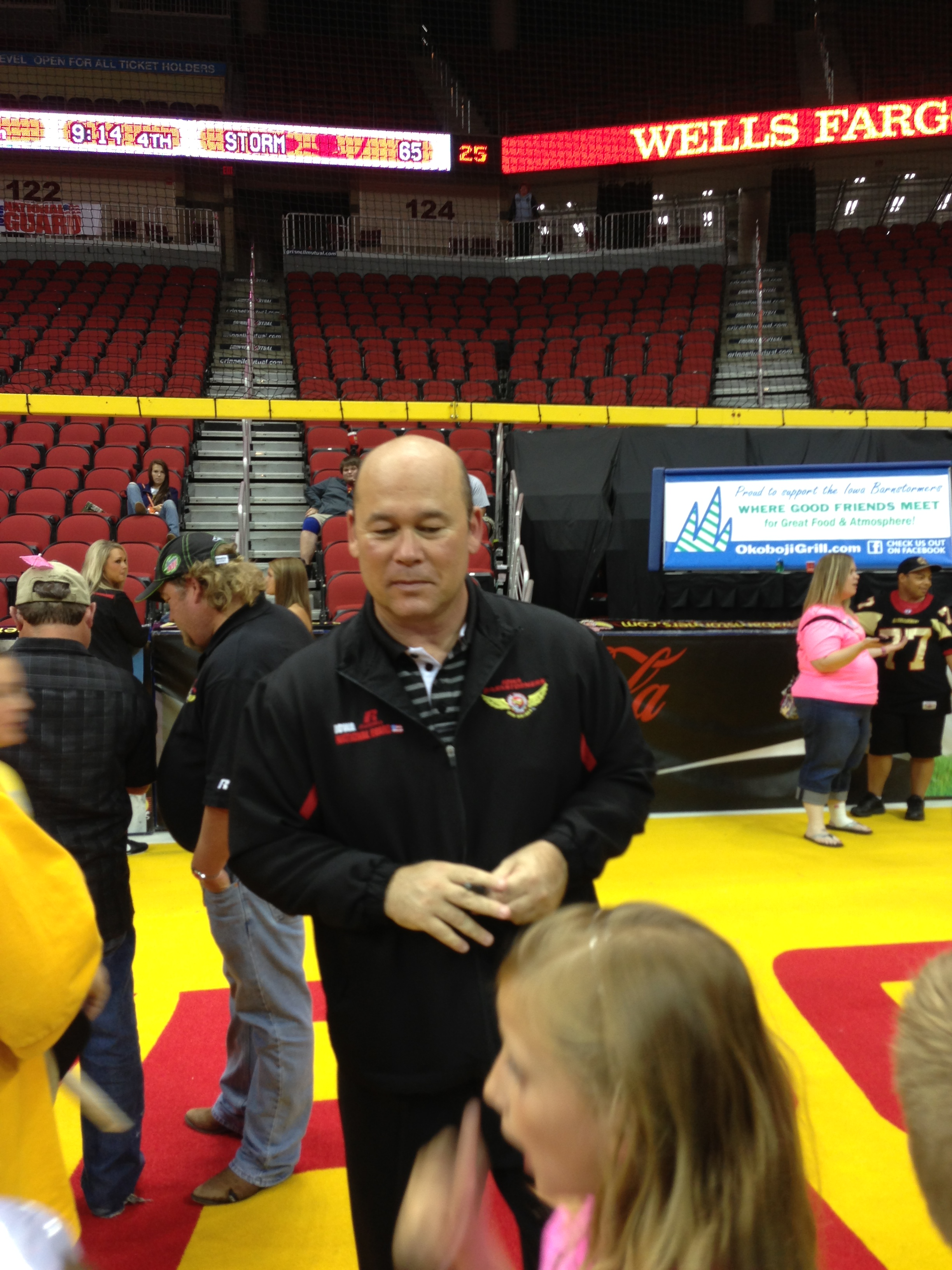
- Hohensee with the Iowa Barnstormers in 2013

No. 8
- Position: Quarterback

Personal information
- Born: February 22, 1961 (age 65); Inglewood, California, U.S.
- Listed height: 6 ft 0 in (1.83 m)
- Listed weight: 205 lb (93 kg)

Career information
- High school: John A. Rowland (Rowland Heights, California)
- College: Minnesota
- NFL draft: 1983: undrafted

Career history

Playing
- Washington Federals (1983–1984); Ottawa Rough Riders (1985); Toronto Argonauts (1985); Chicago Bears (1987); Pittsburgh Gladiators (1987–1988)

Coaching
- Washington Commandos (1990) Head coach; Albany Firebirds (1991–1993) Offensive coordinator; Albany Firebirds (1994–1996) Head coach; Anaheim Piranhas (1997) Head coach; Albany Firebirds (1998) Offensive coordinator; New England Sea Wolves (1999–2000) Head coach; Chicago Rush (2001–2008) Head coach; Peoria Pirates (2009) Head coach; Chicago Rush (2010) Head coach; Philadelphia Soul (2011) Head coach; Iowa Barnstormers (2012–2014) Head coach; Portland Thunder (2015) Head coach

Awards and highlights
- ArenaBowl champion (2006); Arena Football Hall of Fame

Career NFL statistics
- Passing attempts: 52
- Passing completions: 28
- Completion percentage: 53.8%
- TD–INT: 4–1
- Passing yards: 343
- Passer rating: 92.1
- Stats at Pro Football Reference

Career CFL statistics
- Completions: 37
- Attempts: 84
- Passing yards: 571
- Touchdowns: 3
- Interceptions: 7

Career AFL statistics
- Completions: 178
- Attempts: 304
- Passing yards: 2,031
- Touchdowns: 39
- Interceptions: 4
- Stats at ArenaFan.com

Head coaching record
- Regular season: 158–160 (.497)
- Postseason: 12–13 (.480)
- Career: 170–173(.496)

Michael Louis Hohensee (born February 22, 1961) is an American former professional football quarterback who played in the United States Football League (USFL), Canadian Football League (CFL), National Football League (NFL), and Arena Football League (AFL). He played college football for the Minnesota Golden Gophers. He was the head coach of eight different arena football franchises, winning ArenaBowl XX with the Chicago Rush in 2006.

== Playing career ==
=== College ===
In college, Hohensee played for the University of Minnesota. After coming out of junior college at Mt. San Antonio College in Walnut, California, Hohensee quarterbacked the Gophers for two seasons in 1981 and 1982, setting numerous school passing records. Mike is also in the University of Minnesota Sports Hall of Fame.

=== Playing career ===
He played for the Washington Federals of the United States Football League from 1983 to 1984, the Ottawa Rough Riders and Toronto Argonauts of the Canadian Football League in 1985, and was a replacement player on the Chicago Bears of the National Football League during the 1987 NFL strike. As the Washington Federals' quarterback in 1983, Hohensee is best remembered for coming up one foot short of the goal line in a loss to the Oakland Invaders.

Before beginning his career as an Arena Football League coach, Hohensee was a quarterback for the AFL's Pittsburgh Gladiators during the league's first two seasons in 1987 and 1988. He threw the first touchdown pass in AFL history.

== Coaching career ==
=== Chicago Rush, AFL 2001–2008 ===
Hohensee was named the first coach in Chicago Rush history, with the team beginning play in 2001. With Hohensee, the Rush made the playoffs in every season, winning ArenaBowl XX. The Rush played in four consecutive AFL Conference Championship games from 2004 to 2008, and won its division in 2002, 2004, 2007, and 2008. "Coach Ho" recorded his 100th career victory in 2006 when the team defeated the Las Vegas Gladiators at Allstate Arena.

=== Peoria Pirates, AF2 2009 ===
When the AFL stopped play in 2009, Hohensee remained in Arena Football in Illinois. He coached the Peoria Pirates, but the team finished 5–11.

=== Chicago Rush, AFL 2010 ===
Hohensee returned to coach the Rush when the AFL returned for the 2010 season. He led the Rush to a 10–6 season, and the team made the playoffs. On August 20, 2010, Hohensee announced he was resigning from the Rush after nine season with the team. He finished with 108 regular season wins for the Rush and nine more in the playoffs.

=== Philadelphia Soul, AFL 2011 ===
Hohensee was hired at the coach of the Philadelphia Soul on August 31, 2010. He was the team's first head coach since the team went on hiatus together with the league as a whole following the 2008 season. The team's last game prior to Hohensee's hire was ArenaBowl XXII in which they defeated the San Jose SaberCats 59–56. After a 6–12 season, Hohensee resigned on July 27, 2011.

=== Iowa Barnstormers, AFL 2012–2014 ===
On August 16, 2011, Hohensee was named the head coach of the Iowa Barnstormers. On August 4, 2014, it was announced that his contract would not be renewed. During his three seasons as Barnstormers coach, he posted a 19–35 record and failed to make the postseason once.

=== Portland Thunder, AFL 2015 ===
On September 24, 2014, Hohensee was named the head coach of the Portland Thunder. After a 5–13 record, and 3rd-place finish in the Pacific Division, Hohensee's contract was not renewed. Has since become inactive as an AFL coach.

=== McDaniel College, Green Terror ===
In 2016 Hohensee become the pass game & quarterbacks coordinator at McDaniel College, an NCAA Division III liberal arts college. Hohensee joined the Green Terror with fellow Arena Football hall of fame coach Mike Dailey.

=== Judson University, Eagles ===
In 2019 Hohensee become the Football Advisor to the University President and the football program at Judson University, a liberal arts college that is a member of the NAIA and the Mid-States Football Association conference. Hohensee consults with the coaching staff and advises the university leadership on aspects of leading and managing a football program.

=== Head coaching record ===
Team	Year	Regular season				Postseason			
Team	Year	Won	Lost	Win %	Finish	Won	Lost	Win %	Result
WSH	1990	2	6	.250	6th in AFL	-	-	-	-
ALB	1994	10	2	.833	1st in American Conference	1	1	.500	Lost to Arizona Rattlers in AFL semifinals
ALB	1995	7	5	.583	1st in AFL East	1	1	.500	Lost to Tampa Bay Storm in AFL semifinals
ALB	1996	10	4	.714	1st in AFL East	1	1	.500	Lost to Iowa Barnstormers in AFL semifinals
ALB total		27	11	.711	-	3	3	.500	
ANA	1997	2	12	.143	3rd in AFL West	-	-	-	-
NE	1999	5	9	.357	3rd in AFL East	-	-	-	-
NE	2000	8	6	.571	2nd in AFL East	0	1	.000	Lost to Oklahoma Wranglers in first round
NE total		13	15	.450	-	0	1	.000	
CHI	2001	7	7	.500	3rd in AFL Central	1	1	.500	Lost to Grand Rapids Rampage in second round
CHI	2002	9	5	.642	1st in AFL Central	1	1	.500	Lost to Arizona Rattlers in semifinals
CHI	2003	8	8	.500	3rd in AFL Central	0	1	.000	Lost to New York Dragons in wildcard round
CHI	2004	11	5	.688	1st in AFL Central	1	1	.500	Lost to San Jose SaberCats in semifinals
CHI	2005	9	7	.563	2nd in AFL Central	1	1	.500	Lost to Colorado Crush in semifinals
CHI	2006	7	9	.438	3rd in AFL Central	4	0	1.000	Defeated Orlando Predators to win ArenaBowl XX
CHI	2007	12	4	.750	1st in AFL Central	1	1	.500	Lost to San Jose SaberCats in semifinals
CHI	2008	11	5	.688	1st in AFL Central	0	1	.000	Lost to Grand Rapids Rampage in divisional round
CHI	2010	10	6	.625	2nd in AFL Central	0	1	.000	Lost to Milwaukee Iron in first round
CHI total		83	57	.593	-	9	8	.530	
PHI	2011	6	12	.333	4th in AFL East	-	-	-	-
Iowa	2012	7	11	.389	3rd in AFL Central	-	-	-	-
Iowa	2013	6	12	.333	3rd in AFL Central	-	-	-	-
Iowa	2014	6	12	.333	4th in AFL Eastern	-	-	-	-
Iowa total		19	35	.352	-	-	-	-	
POR	2015	5	13	.278	3rd in AFL Pacific	0	1	.000	Lost to San Jose SaberCats in semifinals
Total		158	160	.497		12	13	.480	

== Accomplishments ==
- ArenaBowl XX winning coach
- Reached AFL Semifinals – 1994, 1995, 1996, 2002, 2004, 2005, 2006, 2007
- Division Winner—1995, 1996, 2002, 2004, 2007, 2008

== Car accident ==
On Saturday April 28, 2007 Hohensee was hit by a car while walking in a grocery store parking lot, but still coached the Rush to a victory over the Philadelphia Soul two days later. He coached the game in the team press box with a sling around his arm.
