= Dennison Robinson =

American gridiron football player and coach (born 1978)

No. 21
- Position: Defensive back

Personal information
- Born: September 7, 1978 (age 48); Monroe, Louisiana, U.S.
- Listed height: 6 ft 0 in (1.83 m)
- Listed weight: 195 lb (88 kg)

Career information
- High school: Murphy (Mobile, Alabama)
- College: West Georgia
- NFL draft: 1999: undrafted

Career history

Playing
- Mobile Admirals (1999); Toronto Argonauts (1999); Mobile Seagulls (2000); Quad City Steamwheelers (2001); New Jersey/Las Vegas Gladiators (2002–2004); Grand Rapids Rampage (2005); Chicago Rush (2006–2008); Chicago Slaughter (2009–2010)

Coaching
- Chicago Slaughter (2011–2012) Defensive coordinator; Chicago Blitz (2014–2016) Assistant defensive coordinator

Awards and highlights
- ArenaBowl champion (2006); AFL Defensive Player of the Year (2008); First-team All-Arena (2008); AFL All-Rookie Team (2002)

Career AFL statistics
- Tackles: 347
- Interceptions: 36
- Receptions: 187
- Receiving yards: 1,923
- Total TDs: 35
- Stats at ArenaFan.com

Marquette Dennison Robinson (born September 7, 1978) is an American former football defensive back who played in the Arena Football League (AFL). He also played for the Chicago Slaughter of the CIFL. He attended the University of West Georgia.

== Early life ==
Robinson attended Murphy High School in Mobile, Alabama, and was a letterman in football and basketball. He was a two-time All-State selection in both sports. Marquette Dennison Robinson graduated from Murphy High School in 1996.

== College career ==
Robinson attended Mississippi Gulf Coast Community College and was a two-year letterman in football. Robinson graduated from Mississippi Gulf Coast and attended the University of West Georgia, where he lettered during the 1998 season.

== Professional career ==
=== RFL ===
In the first half of 1999, Robinson played for the Mobile Admirals of the short-lived Regional Football League.

=== CFL ===
In the second half of 1999, Robinson played for the Toronto Argonauts of the Canadian Football League, where he intercepted 7 passes.

=== af2 ===
Robinson played one season of in the af2 for the Quad City Steamwheelers and finished the season with 59 receptions for 660 yards and 15 touchdowns on offense, and defensively, he posted 67 tackles, eight interceptions, and 28 pass deflections.

=== AFL ===
Dennison quickly became an impact player when he played for the Las Vegas Gladiators (2002–2004). He was named AFL All-Rookie team in 2002. In 2005, Robinson signed with the Grand Rapids Rampage. In 2008, while playing for the Chicago Rush, Johnson was named Arena Football League Defensive Player of the Year. He earned this title with leading the AFL with 13 interceptions and returning two for a touchdown.

=== CIFL ===
Robinson spent the 2009 season as a member of the Chicago Slaughter of the Continental Indoor Football League because the Arena Football League suspended operations for the 2009 season. In his first five games with the Slaughter, Robinson picked off four passes and returned two for touchdowns.

== Post-playing career ==
Robinson later served as the assistant defensive coordinator and director of player development for the Chicago Blitz of the Continental Indoor Football League (CIFL).
