= John Moyer (American football) =

American football player (born 1975)

No. 99
- Position: Defensive lineman

Personal information
- Born: February 24, 1975 (age 51); Freeport, Illinois, U.S.
- Listed height: 6 ft 3 in (1.91 m)
- Listed weight: 265 lb (120 kg)

Career information
- College: Eastern Illinois
- NFL draft: 1997: undrafted

Career history
- Indianapolis Colts (1997)*; Florida Bobcats (1999–2001); Chicago Rush (2002–2008)
- * Offseason or practice squad member only

Awards and highlights
- ArenaBowl champion (2006); 2× First-team All-Arena (2003, 2004); 2× Second-team All-Arena (2002, 2005); AFL Lineman of the Year (2004); 2× AFL All-Ironman Team (2002 & 2003); #99 Retired by the Chicago Rush

Career AFL statistics
- Receptions-Yards-TDs: 25-221-13
- Rushes-Yards-TDs: 5-13-1
- Tackles: 160
- Sacks: 42.5
- Interceptions: 4
- Stats at ArenaFan.com

John Moyer (born February 24, 1975) is an American former professional football defensive lineman known mostly for his time with the Chicago Rush of the Arena Football League (AFL). He played college football at Eastern Illinois. As a member of the Rush, Moyer was a four-time All-Arena selection from 2002 to 2005, while also twice earning All-Ironman Team honors and being named the Lineman of the Year in 2004.

== Professional career ==
=== Indianapolis Colts ===
Moyer signed with the Indianapolis Colts after going undrafted in the 1997 NFL draft, but he was waived before the season started.

=== Florida Bobcats ===
From 1999 to 2001, Moyer played with the Florida Bobcats of the Arena Football League. Moyer played both offensive and defensive line.

=== Chicago Rush ===
On December 10, 2001, Moyer was selected by the Chicago Rush in the dispersal draft. From 2002 to 2008, Moyer played with the Rush. As a member of the Rush, Moyer was a four-time All-Arena selection from 2002 to 2005, while also twice earning All-Ironman Team honors and being named the Lineman of the Year in 2004. On May 29, 2011, the Rush retired Moyer's #99 jersey.
