= DeJuan Alfonzo =

American football player (born 1977)

No. 23
- Positions: Wide receiver, linebacker

Personal information
- Born: January 12, 1977 (age 49); Indianapolis, Indiana, U.S.
- Listed height: 6 ft 0 in (1.83 m)
- Listed weight: 205 lb (93 kg)

Career information
- High school: Arsenal Tech (Indianapolis)
- College: Indiana State
- NFL draft: 2000: undrafted

Career history
- Baltimore Ravens (2000)*; Indiana Firebirds (2001–2002); Chicago Rush (2003–2008); Chicago Slaughter (2009); Chicago Rush (2010); Philadelphia Soul (2011)
- * Offseason or practice squad member only

Awards and highlights
- ArenaBowl champion (2006); 3× First-team All-Arena (2007, 2008, 2010); AFL Ironman of the Year (2010); 4× AFL All-Ironman Team (2006, 2007, 2008, 2010)

Career AFL statistics
- Receptions: 135
- Receiving yards: 1,520
- Receiving TDs: 29
- Tackles: 408
- Interceptions: 26
- Stats at ArenaFan.com

DeJuan R. Alfonzo (born January 12, 1977) is an American former football wide receiver/linebacker. Alfonzo attended Indiana State University.

== College and NFL career ==
Alfonzo was a first-team All-American defensive back and a first team All-American kick returner in 1999 with Indiana State, and a 4 time letterwinner in 1996–1999. Finished his college career with 191 tackles and 10 interceptions. He set school records for most blocked kicks in a career with 5, most blocked kicks in a season with 3, and highest punt return average with 13.5 yards.

Alfonzo went on to go to training camp with the Baltimore Ravens in 2000.

== Professional career ==
=== Arena Football League, 2001–2008 ===
Alfonzo entered the AFL in 2001 with the Indiana Firebirds but spend the whole season on injured reserve. He played the 2002 season and then was released prior to the 2003 season. Alfonzo went on to sign with the Chicago Rush and has been with the team ever since. Alfonzo began his Rush career as a defensive specialist, but rotated also as a WR/DB until becoming the teams WR/LB in late 2006. Alfonzo was a key figure in the teams run to ArenaBowl XX in 2006. Alfonzo was named the teams Ironman of the Year, as he played wide receiver, linebacker, special teams, and held on field goals and extra points. He was named in the First Team All-Arena in 2006, 2007, 2008', 2009' and 2010.

With the new free substitution rule added to the game in 2007, Alfonzo was regulated mainly as the team's jack linebacker, but still remained active as an Ironman, lining up as a receiver or fullback at times. Despite the reduced time on the field, Alfonzo was still a playmaker, being named by many as the best jack linebacker in the league.

=== CIFL career ===
After the AFL suspended operations for the 2009 season, Alfonzo signed with the Chicago Slaughter of the Continental Indoor Football League on February 11. Along with many other Chicago Rush players, the Slaughter finished the season undefeated at 14-0 and won the CIFL championship.

=== AFL 2010–2011 ===
In 2010, Alfonzo returned to the Rush during the rebirth of the Arena Football League. He was named the AFL's Ironman of the Year and made the AFL All-Arena First Team at both Jack Linebacker and Ironman. He made 63 tackles with four interceptions, returning three for touchdowns. On offense, he caught 28 passes for 328 yards and scored six times on offense.
