= Etu Molden =

American football player (born 1979)

No. 17
- Position: Wide receiver/Linebacker

Personal information
- Born: January 18, 1979 (age 47); Sacramento, California, U.S.
- Listed height: 6 ft 2 in (1.88 m)
- Listed weight: 200 lb (91 kg)

Career information
- College: Montana (1998–2001)
- NFL draft: 2002: undrafted

Career history
- Chicago Rush (2004–2007); Las Vegas Gladiators (2007); Spokane Shock (2008–2009); Jacksonville Sharks (2010)*
- * Offseason or practice squad member only

Awards and highlights
- ArenaBowl champion (2006); NCAA Division I-AA national champion (2001)

Etu Baraka Molden (born January 18, 1979) is an American former professional football wide receiver/linebacker who played in the Arena Football League (AFL). He attended the University of Montana.

== Early life ==
Molden attended Jesuit High School in Carmichael, California, where he lettered in football, basketball, baseball, and track.

== College career ==
He attended and played for Montana from 1998 to 2001. Molden finished his career at Montana with 161 catches for 2,300 yards and 26 touchdowns. Molden also tallied 51 receptions for 620 yards and 4 touchdowns in the Division I-AA playoffs (which the Grizzlies reached each year of Molden's collegiate career).

Molden was a first-team All-Big Sky Conference selection after catching a team high 102 passes for 1,414 yards and 14 touchdowns in his senior season, and started all 16 games during Montana's 2001 season, the Division I-AA national champions that year.

Etu was named the co-winner of the team's outstanding offensive player award after recording 6 games with over 100 receiving yards.

As a junior, Molden earned second team all-conference honors after catching a team high 56 passes for 699 yards and 6 touchdowns during the regular season.

Played his first season as wide receiver in 1999, catching 29 passes for 456 yards and 6 scores. Molden spent his freshman season at Montana as a safety and made 19 tackles.

In 2001, Molden was tagged as Montana's "Go To Guy." He was instrumental in many key wins during the Grizzlies' national championship campaign, including a game-winning touchdown catch against conference foe Eastern Washington in double overtime. Molden was also nicknamed "The Sacramento Killer" for catching game-touchdown passes against Sacramento State two consecutive years (1999 and 2000). This is notable considering Molden is from Sacramento.

Molden was also a fan favorite at Montana, particularly with the infamous "North Endzone" of Washington–Grizzly Stadium.

== Professional career ==
In three seasons with the Rush, Molden caught 264 passes for 3,132 yards and scored 71 touchdowns. He was named to the league's All-Rookie team in 2004 and the All-Ironman team in 2005. In 2006, despite missing four regular season games due to injury, he still led the Rush with 67 receptions and helped them win ArenaBowl XX in Las Vegas.

Molden was released by the Chicago Rush on February 27, 2007, in the team's final cutdown before the start of the regular season. He was signed by the Las Vegas Gladiators, prior to the start of the season. 3/4 of the way through the season, Las Vegas released him. On May 31, 2007, the Chicago Rush re-signed Molden.

In 2009, Molden, was signed by the Jacksonville Sharks, but never played in a game due to failure to report.
