= Chicago Rush =

Arena football team in Illinois, US

Logo

General information
- Founded: 2001
- Folded: 2013
- Headquartered: Rosemont, Illinois
- Colors: Navy blue, silver and white
- Mascot: Grabowski

Personnel
- Owner: Ernest Clark

Team history
- Chicago Rush (2001–2013)

Home fields
- Allstate Arena (2001–2013); BMO Center (2013)

League / conference affiliations
- Arena Football League (2001–2013): National Conference (2001–2013); Central (2001–2013)

Championships
- League championships: 1: 2006
- Division championships: 5: Central: 2002, 2004, 2007, 2008, 2011

Playoff appearances (11)
- 2001, 2002, 2003, 2004, 2005, 2006, 2007, 2008, 2010, 2011, 2013

The Chicago Rush were a professional arena football team based in Rosemont, Illinois. The team was founded in 2001 and played in the Arena Football League's Central Division. The Rush qualified for the playoffs in 11 of 12 AFL seasons, during which they won ArenaBowl XX in 2006 and captured five division titles. The Rush played home games at Allstate Arena from 2001 to 2013. The team struggled to find a permanent owner and later relocated to Rockford, Illinois in 2013 to play their last three home games of their final season. The AFL itself ceased operations in 2019. In 2023, Chicago-based music producer Ernest Clark acquired the Rush and announced plans to join a revived AFL in 2025. However, the AFL folded again in 2024.

== History ==
=== Founding and background (1999) ===
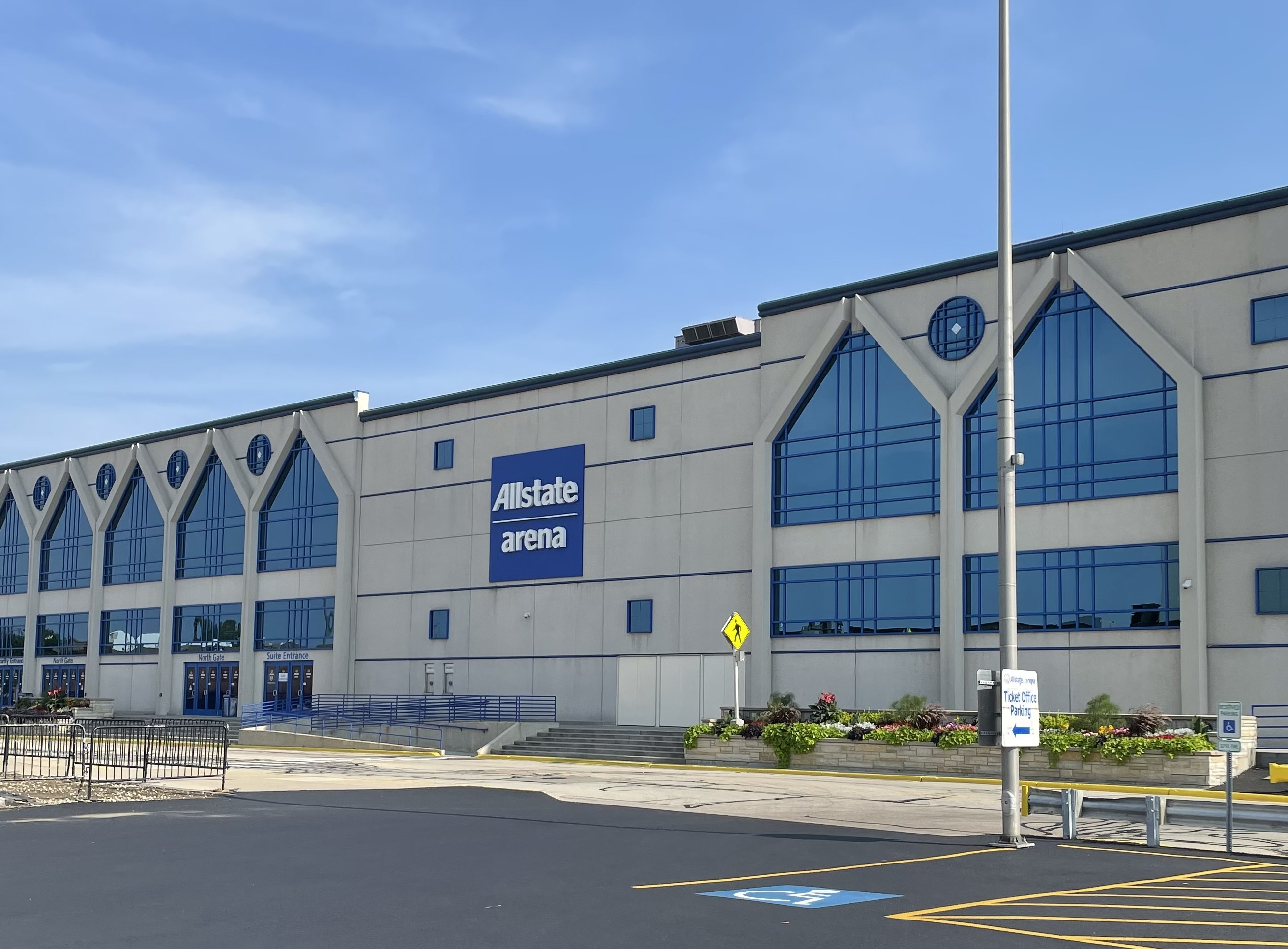
The Rush played their homes games at the Allstate Arena from 2001 to 2013.

In July 1999, California entrepreneur Alan Levin led an investment group that secured an expansion team in the Arena Football League. The investment group included NFL hall of fame running back Walter Payton. Levin also tried to recruit Mike Ditka into the investment group, who joined in 2004 after initially rejecting Levin's offer in 2001. In 2000, Levin and the ownership group formally announced the team would be called the Rush and revealed the team's logo. They also announced the signing of their first player in franchise history, Derek Stingley Sr.

The Rush filled the void left by the Chicago Bruisers, a former Arena team based in Rosemont, Illinois, who ceased operations in 1989. Levin considered having the team play in the United Center on Chicago's west side, but instead announced the team would play in Rosemont's Allstate Arena. The Rush's official mascot was a construction worker named Grabowski, a reference to Chicago's blue collar background. The name was coined by Ditka in January 1986 to describe the difference between the playing style, culture, and work ethic of the Chicago Bears and Los Angeles Rams.

=== Early years and success (2001–2008) ===
Mike Hohensee was the franchise's first coach, and he remained the Rush's only coach until becoming the head coach of the Philadelphia Soul in 2011.

In their inaugural year (2001), the Rush finished the regular season with a 7–7 and won their first playoff game, beating the Orlando Predators 41–26. They lost to the eventual ArenaBowl XV champion Grand Rapids Rampage 53–21. The team featured young players that would become Rush fixtures and fan favorites in the years to come, including quarterback Billy Dicken, Joe Douglass, Damien Porter and Jamie McGourty, and Riley Kleinhesselink, Cedric Walker, and Anthony Ladd.

In 2002, the Rush won the Central division with a 9–5 record and received a bye in the playoffs. Dicken returned at quarterback and Chicago added Antonio Chatman who was named to the All-Rookie team as the team's main wide receiver and return man. Chicago added defensive linemen John Moyer and James Baron. They defeated the Dallas Desperados 60–47, but fell in the semifinals to the Arizona Rattlers 46–35.

In 2003, the AFL expanded from 14 games to 16. Dicken was the team's quarterback, but missed time after breaking his jaw in the middle of the season. Antonio Chatman broke Rush franchise records for All-Purpose and Return Yards. He caught 123 passes for 1,636 yards and 29 touchdowns. On special teams, he netted 2,062 return yards and got into the end zone seven times. Chicago also signed DeJuan Alfonzo early in the season from the Indiana Firebirds. Alfonzo would be with the team until 2010. Chicago also signed FB/LB Bob McMillen, who would play with the team until 2007 and became the Rush's head coach in 2011. After starting the season 0–3, the Rush finished 8–5 and got into the playoffs as a Wild Card Team. After the team's 0–3 start, Chicago squared off against the 3-0 Los Angeles Avengers, facing off against Tony Graziani and the league's top ranked offense. Dameon Porter sealed the win with a key interception at the goal line with one minute left to play. The victory turned around the Rush season. Chicago defeated the Indiana Firebirds on the final day of the regular season, 46–43 in overtime, to clinch a playoff berth. Chicago did not win a playoff game, and fell in the Wild Card Game to the New York Dragons 48–45. Chatman went to the NFL after the season, signing with the Green Bay Packers.

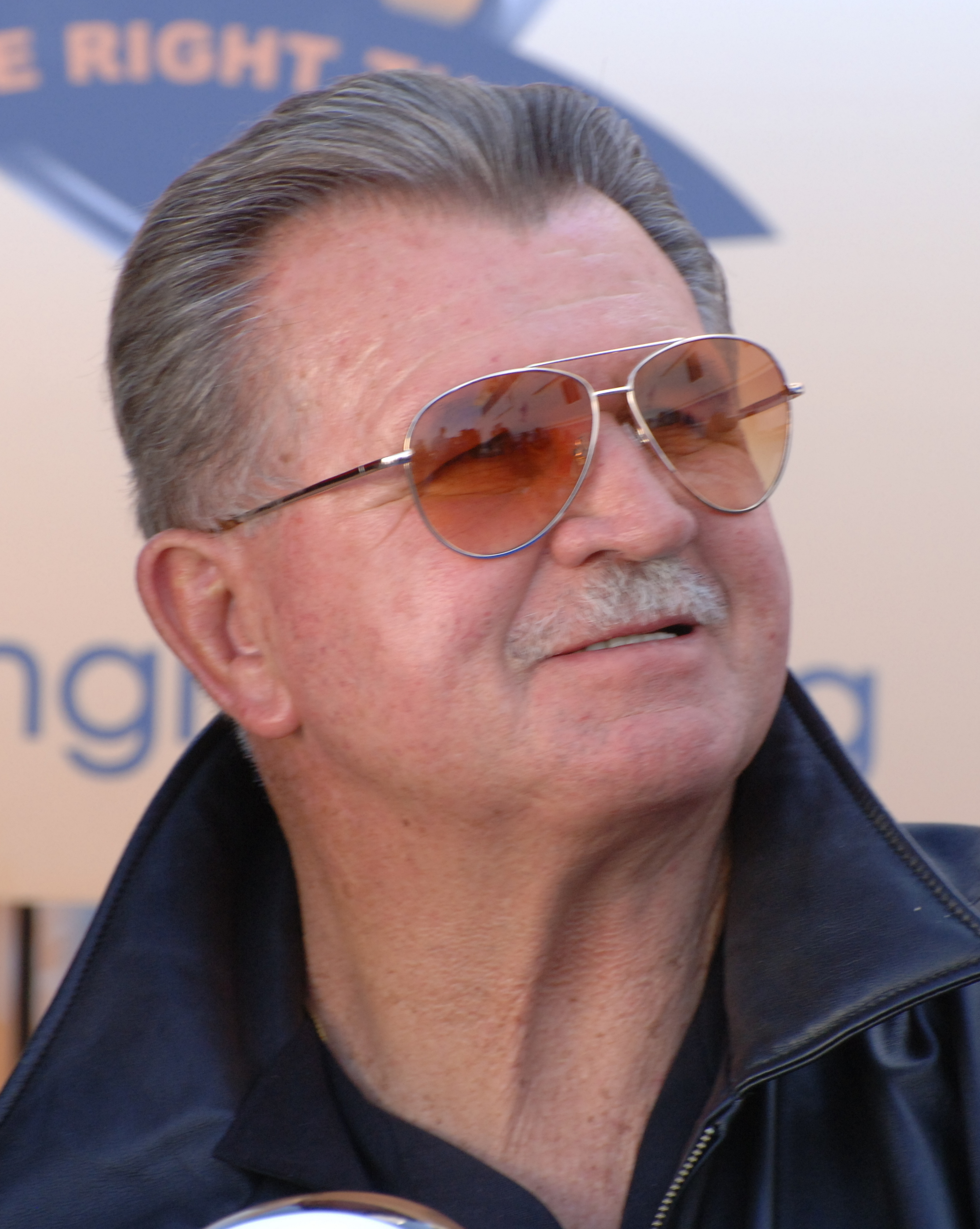
Mike Ditka formally joined the Rush as a minority owner in 2004.

In 2004, the Rush signed Raymond Philyaw as their quarterback. Philyaw was known for his efficiency and record touchdown-interception ratio. In 2004, Philyaw threw just four interceptions. Chicago started the year 4–0, their best start in franchise history. The Rush won the Central division with an 11–5 record. They won their first-round game 59–49 over the Orlando Predators but fell in the semifinals to the eventual ArenaBowl XVIII champion San Jose SaberCats 49–35. Chicago led early in the game, but Philyaw tore his ACL on a scramble, and the Rush could not overcome the injury.

In 2005, they went to the AFL playoffs as the #3 seed in the American Conference. They won the conference semifinal over the Los Angeles Avengers 52–45, but ended up losing the American Conference Championship Game to the eventual ArenaBowl XIX Champion Colorado Crush in overtime, with a final score of 49–43. That game became known as the "Confetti Game", due to an arena employee firing a confetti cannon prematurely, when the game was extended due to a defensive penalty on the final play. After a ten-minute delay to clean the confetti, the Rush were able to tie the game on the untimed down, forcing the overtime period.

In 2006, despite their first losing record of 7–9, the Rush got into the playoffs, receiving the #5 seed in the American Conference.

In the off-season, signed former Heisman Trophy finalist Michael Bishop and Matt D'Orazio to fight to be the team's starting quarterback, and D'Orazio got the game. During the regular season, Chicago started the year at 0–2, but during the season, the Rush picked up defensive back Jeremy Unertl and offensive specialist Bobby Sippio. Both made huge impacts on their respective sides of the ball. With a 5–9 record, the Rush won its last two games of the regular season to get a playoff spot. In the playoffs, the Rush managed to pull off key upsets. In the Wild Card Round, the Rush defeated the fourth-seeded Nashville Kats 55–47. In the Divisional Round, Chicago managed to pull off a huge upset by taking down the defending champion Colorado Crush, 63–46. In the Conference Championship they upset the second-seeded San Jose SaberCats 59–56, giving the Rush their first ArenaBowl appearance in franchise history.

In ArenaBowl XX, the Rush defeated the Orlando Predators, 69–61, to give Chicago their first Arena Bowl title. Quarterback Matt D'Orazio was Offensive Player of the Game, wide receiver/defensive back Dennison Robinson took Defensive Player of the Game honors, and fullback/linebacker Bob McMillen was named the Ironman of the Game.

In 2007, the team won the American Conference Central Division with a record of 12–4. D'Orazio was the team's quarterback and Bobby Sippio, in his first full season with the Rush caught 125 passes for 1,742 yards and 53 passes. After the season, Sippio would sign with the Kansas City Chiefs. They defeated the L.A. Avengers on June 9, 2007 in the divisional finals. They then played the San Jose SaberCats for the conference final, yet they came up short losing 61–49.

In 2008, the Rush made a free agency splash by signing AFL legends Sherdrick Bonner and Damian Harrell. The Rush opened its 2008 campaign against the defending ArenaBowl XXI champion San Jose SaberCats. Chicago convincingly defeated the Sabercats 70–47 in front of 15,409 fans at the Allstate Arena. Injuries allowed Russ Michna to become the team's starter over Bonner. Harrell, Donovan Morgan, and Travis LaTendresse would all post 1,000-yard receiving seasons. En route to an 11–5 season, Chicago locked up the conference's top seed and home field advantage for the entire playoffs. It was the first time Chicago had home field advantage and the Rush had never lost a home playoff game, going 3–0. The Grand Rapids Rampage drew Chicago in the divisional round. The Rampage finished the regular season 6–10 but stunned the Rush and 14,338 fans 58–41. The Rampage would lose a week later to the Sabercats at the HP Pavilion.

=== League restructuring (2009–2011) ===
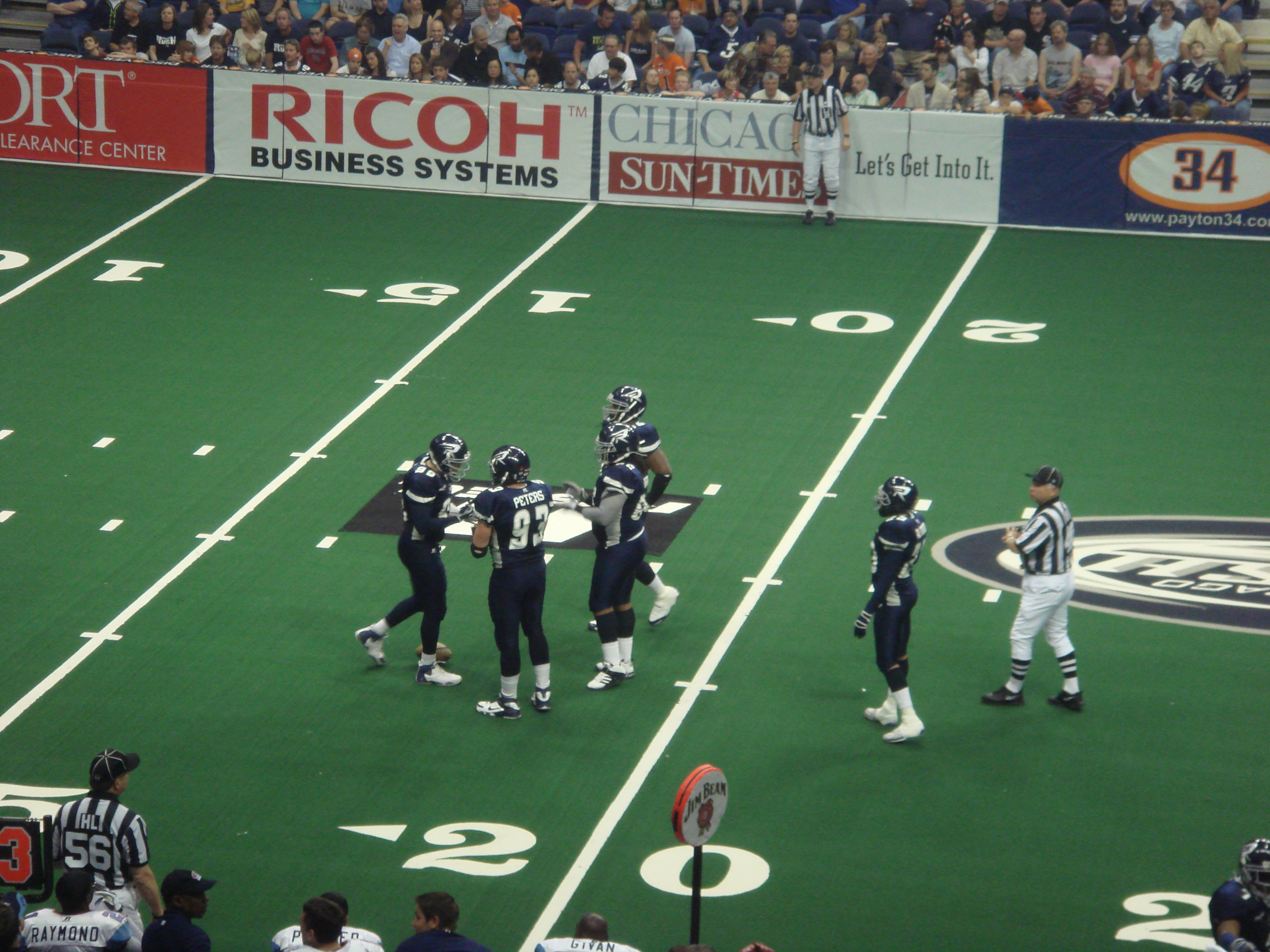
The Rush playing the Nashville Kats in 2007.

In August 2009, the Arena Football League filed for bankruptcy. The league suspended operations for the 2009 season to refinance and restructure its business plan but considered returning for the 2010 season. Rush owner Alan Levin opposed the Arena Football League returning for the 2010 season, arguing that teams lack the staff, players, and time needed to properly prepare. He instead advocated for delaying the league's relaunch until 2011 so owners can establish a better business plan and attract investors.

The AFL entered bankruptcy court in late 2009 where its intellectual properties, including team names, logos, and history, were sold off to a new group of investors, Arena Football 1, for a heavily discounted $6.1 million. The Arena Football 1 (AF1) was a single legal entity, as opposed to the original AFL's collection of multiple separate owners. Levin's stake in the Rush was effectively eliminated, while the AFL sold the new incarnation of the Rush to Chicago Gridiron LLC later that year. Mike Ditka purchased a stake in the Rush again as well.

The 2010 Rush roster would feature many new faces. However, former Rush players quarterback Russ Michna, jack linebacker/wide receiver DeJuan Alfonzo, and linemen Joe Peters, Robert Boss, and Beau Elliot rejoined the team. Also on the roster was wide receiver Samie Parker, Thaddeus Coleman, and kicker Chris Gould.

Chicago returned to the field on April 2, 2010 on the road against the Iowa Barnstormers. The game was broadcast on the NFL Network and Chicago won 61–43. The Rush began the season 4–0 and were in first place in the division at 10–4. However, the team lost its last two games, first to the 1–13 Dallas Vigilantes and then closed out the year on the road losing to the Spokane Shock. It cost the team a chance at the division title and forced the team to go on the road for the playoffs. The team ended the regular season at 10–6, and lost to the Milwaukee Iron in the playoffs.

The Rush celebrated its 10th season in 2011. Bob McMillen replaced Mike Hohensee to become the team's second head coach in team history, and Russ Michna returned at quarterback. Chicago finished the regular season with a 13–5 record and finished first in the Central Division. It was the most regular season wins in Rush history, breaking the 2007 team's 12–4 mark. Defensive back Vic Hall broke AFL record for interceptions in a season with 15, doing it as a rookie. The Rush defense led the league in points allowed (46.3 per game) and broke league records for the most turnovers (56) and interceptions (42) in a season. Wide receiver Reggie Gray finished the year with the most catches (130) and receiving yards (1,969) in franchise history, and tied the Rush record with 53 total touchdowns. Bobby Sippio held the old records. Chicago defeated the Dallas Vigilantes at Allstate Arena in the first round of the playoffs, but the Rush season ended the following week, falling to the Arizona Rattlers in the National Conference Championship Game. Arizona advanced to ArenaBowl XXIV, but lost to the Jacksonville Sharks in the championship. For the Rush, it marked the sixth time in franchise history the team had advanced to the AFL Conference Championships.

=== Ownership instability and demise (2012–2013) ===
In April 2012, Chicago Gridiron LLC declared bankruptcy and abandoned the team. The announcement came just before the start of the season, after games had already been scheduled and tickets sold. The AFL intervened to manage the franchise for the 2012 AFL season, while actively searching for a new ownership group. The team itself finished the season with a 10–8 record, missing the playoffs for the first and only time in franchise history.

The AFL quickly found a new ownership group for the rush, led by Chicago-based entrepreneur Julee B. White in November 2012. However, several of investors within the group backed out of the deal by early January 2013. White returned the seed money to the initial investors and the AFL terminated the contract in late January. A lack of direct communication and transparency strained the relationship between the AFL and Allstate Arena management, who only learned about their tenant's ownership struggles through the news. Furthermore, the arena's general manager reported that White's ownership group had failed to submit a signed contract for the Rush's home games.

Second Rush logo (2013)

On February 7, 2013, the Rush were purchased by Star Rush Football, LLC, an ownership led by private-equity firm manager David Staral Jr. Weeks later, they finalized a deal with Allstate Arena in Rosemont to play all but two home games. The other two home games, June 8 against the Utah Blaze and June 15 versus the San Antonio Talons, were played at the BMO Harris Bank Center in Rockford, Illinois, and initially billed as a tribute to the first "test game" for the AFL in 1986. One week before the season opener, the new ownership group introduced the team's new logo and uniforms, which removed the gray from the logo and replaced it with red.

In May 2013, David Staral Jr. bounced a check needed to secure Allstate Arena for third and fourth home games. The AFL took over control of the franchise for the third time in one year. Staral later pleaded guilty to Federal bankruptcy and wire fraud charges for concealing that he was undergoing bankruptcy proceedings while in negotiations to buy the team. Jerry Kurz, the AFL's president and commissioner, was scrutinized for not properly vetting Staral's background or financial assets.

The Rush finished the 2013 AFL season with a 10–9 record. They secured a playoff berth and played the Spokane Shock in the opening round of the playoffs, where they lost, 69–47.

The league has announced that the Rush did not sign a two-year commitment form to play in 2014 or 2015. The team's roster was liquidated in a dispersal draft. The AFL went out of business in 2019.

=== Attempted revival (2024) ===
The unused logo for the 2024 Rush.

In February 2023, the AFL was relaunched. In October, the league announced the return of the Rush under the helm of a new owner, Ernest "Tuo" Clark. The team hired a general manager and coaching staff while preparing to host player tryouts in the upcoming months. In December, the Rush announced they would delay their return to the 2025 season. However, the new AFL ceased operations and the league's surviving eight teams transitioned to the newly-formed Arena Football One (AF1) in September 2024. The Rush were not included in the AF1's inaugural 2025 season.

== Notable players ==
=== Retired uniform numbers ===
Chicago Rush retired numbers
N°	Player	Position	Seasons	Ref.
44	Bob McMillen	FB/LB	2003-2008	
99	John Moyer	OL/DL	2002-2008	

=== Arena Football Hall of Famers ===
Chicago Rush Hall of Famers
No.	Name	Year Inducted	Position(s)	Years w/ Rush
44	Bob McMillen	2013	FB/LB	2003-2008

=== All-Arena players ===
The following Rush players were named to All-Arena Teams:

- WR Reggie Gray (3), Damian Harrell (1), Bobby Sippio (1)
- WR/DB Dameon Porter (2)
- C Billy Eisenhardt (1), Beau Elliot (1)
- OL/DL John Moyer (4), James Baron (1), Khreem Smith (1)
- JLB DeJuan Alfonzo (3), Kelvin Morris (1)
- DB Vic Hall (1), Dennison Robinson (1), Jeremy Unertl (1)
- K Chris Gould (1)
- OS Antonio Chatman (1)

== Head coaches ==
Name	Term	Regular season				Playoffs		Awards
Name	Term	W	L	T	Win%	W	L	Awards
Mike Hohensee	2001–2010	84	56	0	.600	9	8	
Bob McMillen	2011–2013	23	14	0	.622	1	1	

== Media coverage ==
The Chicago Rush originally had games broadcast on the now defunct Fox Sports Net Chicago during its first two seasons from 2001 to 2002 with mostly Saturday night telecasts. When the AFL signed with NBC from 2003 to 2006, the Rush was one of the most prominently featured teams during the national NBC broadcasts as well as playoff games and the majority of Chicago's games moved to Sunday afternoons. A few of the games not picked up by NBC remained on FSN Chicago until 2006. Beginning in the 2007 season, the AFL began a TV partnership with ESPN and FSN Chicago went under and Comcast SportsNet Chicago took its place. Once again the Rush were widely featured during the national ESPN telecasts on Monday nights and Sunday afternoons.

The regional telecasts went to Comcast SportsNet. From 2001 to 2008, the Rush games were broadcast by Tom Dore and former Chicago Bears offensive lineman James "Big Cat" Williams. The radio deals bounced between 670 The Score and ESPN Radio 1000.

The AFL signed a TV deal with NFL Network after its restructuring in 2010. Regional games aired on Comcast SportsNet and WGN's Chicagoland Television. Online Radio and TV Broadcasts were handled by former Chicago Bruisers Broadcaster Les Grobstein in 2010 through 2013.

== Awards and records ==
This section contains all records, awards, and honors acquired by Rush players in individual seasons. Career records weren't included as not all players spent career with Rush

=== Team awards ===
- Chicago Rush
  - Commissioner's Award
    - 2004, 2007

=== Player awards ===
- DeJuan Alfonzo
  - 2006
    - All-Ironman Team WR/LB
  - 2007
    - Assists Season Leaders, 49
    - Fumble Returns Season Leaders, 5
    - Interception Yards Season Leaders, 147
    - Interception TDs Season Leaders, 3
    - First Team All-Arena JLB
    - All-Ironman Team WR/LB
  - 2010
    - AFL Ironman of the Year
    - AFL All-Arena First Team, Jack Linebacker
    - AFL All-Arena First Team, Ironman
- James Baron
  - 2002
    - First Team All-Arena OL/DL
- Antonio Chatman
  - 2002
    - All-Rookie Team OS
  - 2003
    - Kick Returns Season Leaders, 84
    - Kick Return Yards Season Leaders, 2062
    - Kick Return TDs Season Leaders, 7
    - Second Team All-Arena OS
- Matt D'Orazio
  - 2006
    - Completion Percentage Season Leaders (min. 150 Attempts), 70.3%
    - ArenaBowl XX Offensive Player of the Game
  - 2007
    - QB Rating Season Leaders (min. 150 Attempts), 126.24
    - Completion Percentage Season Leaders (min. 150 Attempts), 69.1%
- Dan Frantz
  - 2007
    - Extra Points (1 pt) Season Leaders, 104
- Keith Gispert
  - 2003
    - All-Rookie Team K
  - 2005
    - FG Percentage Season Leaders (min. 15 Attempts), 61.1%
- Jamie McGourty
  - 2002
    - TD/Rush Pct. Season Leaders (min. 25 rushes), 34.5
- Bob McMillen
  - 2004
    - Rushes Season Leaders, 79
    - Rushing Yards Season Leaders, 285
    - Rushing TDs Season Leaders, 22
    - All-Ironman Team FB/LB
  - 2006
    - ArenaBowl XX Ironman of the Game
- Etu Molden
  - 2004
    - All-Rookie Team WR/LB
  - 2005
    - All-Ironman Team WR/LB
- John Moyer
  - 2002
    - Second Team All-Arena OL/DL
  - 2003
    - Sacks Season Leaders, 9.0
    - First Team All-Arena OL/DL
    - All-Ironman Team OL/DL
  - 2004
    - Sacks Season Leaders, 9.0
    - Blocked Kicks Season Leaders, 3
    - First Team All-Arena OL/DL
    - All-Ironman Team OL/DL
    - Lineman of the Year
  - 2005
    - Blocked Kicks Season Leaders, 3
    - Second Team All-Arena OL/DL
- Raymond Philyaw
  - 2004
    - TD/Rush Pct. Season Leaders (min. 25 rushes), 32.4
- Dameon Porter
  - 2001
    - Yards/Reception Season Leaders (min. 40 receptions), 16.3
    - Interceptions Season Leaders, 12
    - First Team All-Arena WR/DB
    - All-Ironman Team WR/DB
    - Breakout Player of the Year
    - Ironman of the Year
  - 2002
    - Interceptions Season Leaders, 10
    - First Team All-Arena WR/DB
    - All-Ironman Team WR/DB
- Dennison Robinson
  - 2006
    - ArenaBowl XX Defensive Player of the Game
  - 2007
    - Tackles Season Leaders, 95
- Bobby Sippio
  - 2007
    - Receiving Yards Season Leaders, 1742
    - Receiving TDs Season Leaders, 53 TDs
    - TD/Reception Pct. Season Leaders (min. 40 receptions), 42.4
    - First Team All-Arena WR
- Khreem Smith
  - 2006
    - Forced Fumbles Season Leaders, 5
    - Second Team All-Arena OL/DL
    - All-Rookie Team OL/DL
- Jeremy Unertl
  - 2007
    - Second Team All-Arena DB

== Season-by-season ==
ArenaBowl champions	ArenaBowl appearance	Division champions	Playoff berth

Season	League	Conference	Division	Regular season			Postseason results
Season	League	Conference	Division	Finish	Wins	Losses	Postseason results
Chicago Rush
2001	AFL	American	Central	4th	7	7	Won Wild Card Round (Orlando) 41–26; Lost Quarterfinals (Grand Rapids) 21–53
2002	AFL	American	Central	1st	9	5	Won Quarterfinals (Dallas) 60–47; Lost Semifinals (Arizona) 35–46
2003	AFL	American	Central	3rd	8	8	Lost Wild Card Round (New York) 45–48
2004	AFL	American	Central	1st	11	5	Won Quarterfinals (Orlando) 59–49; Lost Semifinals (San Jose) 35–49
2005	AFL	American	Central	2nd	9	7	Won Conference Semifinals (Los Angeles) 52–45; Lost Conference Championship (Colorado) 43–49 (OT)
2006	AFL	American	Central	3rd	7	9	Won Wild Card Round (Nashville) 55–47; Won Divisional Round (Colorado) 63–46; Won Conference Championship (San Jose) 59–56; Won ArenaBowl XX (Orlando) 69–61
2007	AFL	American	Central	1st	12	4	Won Divisional Round (Los Angeles) 52–20; Lost Conference Championship (San Jose) 49–61
2008	AFL	American	Central	1st	11	5	Lost Divisional Round (Grand Rapids) 41–58
2009	The AFL suspended operations for the 2009 season.						
2010	AFL	National	Midwest	2nd	10	6	Lost Conference Semifinals (Milwaukee) 54–64
2011	AFL	National	Central	1st	13	5	Won Conference Semifinals (Dallas) 54–51; Lost Conference Championship (Arizona) 48–54
2012	AFL	National	Central	2nd	10	8	
2013	AFL	National	Central	1st	10	8	Lost Conference Semifinals (Spokane) 47–69
Total					117	77	(includes only regular season)
Total					10	10	(includes only the postseason)
Total					127	87	(includes both regular season and postseason)
