= ArenaBowl XX =

Chicago Rush (American)	Orlando Predators (National)
69	61
	1	2	3	4	Total
CHI	10	24	14	21	69
ORL	0	28	6	27	61
- Date: June 11, 2006
- Stadium: Thomas & Mack Center, Paradise, Nevada
- MVP: Matt D'Orazio, QB, Chicago: Matt D'Orazio, QB, Chicago (Offensive Player of the Game); Dennison Robinson, WR/DB, Chicago (Defensive Player of the Game); Bob McMillen, FB/LB, Chicago (Ironman of the Game)
- Attendance: 13,476
- Winning coach: Mike Hohensee
- Losing coach: Jay Gruden

TV in the United States
- Network: NBC
- Announcers: Tom Hammond, Pat Haden, Lewis Johnson and Marty Snider

ArenaBowl XX, held on Sunday, June 11, 2006, was played to determine the championship of the 2006 season of the Arena Football League (AFL). For the second consecutive year, the game was played at the neutral site of the Thomas & Mack Center in Paradise, Nevada. It pitted the National Conference Champions, the Orlando Predators, against the American Conference Champions, the Chicago Rush. The Chicago Rush won 69–61. This game was televised on AFL on NBC, and was the final game played under the AFL's contract with NBC.

== Background ==
=== Chicago Rush ===
The Chicago Rush was entering its sixth season in the Arena Football League and coming off back-to-back appearances in the AFL's American Conference Championships, falling in 2004 to the San Jose SaberCats and in 2005 to the Colorado Crush in the "Confetti Bowl." Both San Jose and Colorado went on to win the respective ArenaBowls.

The Rush opened the season on the road against the Crush at the Pepsi Center, and Colorado unveiled its ArenaBowl XIX championship banner before the game. For the Rush, Matt D'Orazio was named the team's starting quarterback, replacing Raymond Philyaw in the off-season, and beating out Heisman Trophy finalist Michael Bishop in training camp. The Rush faced adversity before the game even started, when kicker Keith Gispert was injured in pre-game warm-ups. Without a backup on the roster, Bishop kicked off for the Rush and Chicago attempted two-point conversations after every touchdown. The Rush lost when Colorado's Damian Harrell broke a tie game, catching the game-winning pass with one second left in the game.

The following week in Chicago's home opener, the team lost to the New York Dragons. It appeared that D'Orazio had scored the game-winning touchdown run with no time left on the clock, but an offensive penalty nullified the score and ended the game. Chicago was 0–2. The Rush traded for defensive specialist Jeremy Unertl, who intercepted eight passes on the season, and Chicago began a three-game win streak to move to 3–2, with two wins coming in overtime.

But the Rush lost six of its next seven games to fall to 4–6. Then the Rush signed Bobby Sippio to bolster the offense. In the regular season, Sippio caught 38 passes, 17 for touchdowns, and put up 654 receiving yards.

But the Rush sat at 5-9 and had to win its last two games to make the playoffs. The Rush answered the call to finish the year 7–9, blowing out the Utah Blaze 84–48 and defeating the Grand Rapids Rampage 70–47.

It was the Rush's first and only losing season in franchise history, but produced the team's best playoff run. The Rush had to go on the road the entire time.

Chicago opened the post-season on the road against the Nashville Kats. As divisional rivals, the teams met twice in the regular season, and spit the games. Both teams won at home, in overtime, with both games coming down to a made or missed two-point conversation. The Rush defense came up big and Chicago won, 55–47. Up next was the Colorado Crush, the defending ArenaBowl champions who had beaten the Rush twice in the regular season. But Chicago scored on an interception return for a touchdown by Dennison Robinson, Unertl recovered a ball off the net after a kickoff and DeJuan Alfonzo returned a fumble for a touchdown. The Rush led 13–0 after the first quarter, 33–14 at halftime and held on 63–46.

The San Jose SaberCats stood between the Rush and its first trip to the ArenaBowl. San Jose beat Chicago in the conference championship in 2004. The Rush fell behind 21–10 in the second quarter, but fought back to take a 32–28 lead. The teams exchanged scores until the Rush got up by two possessions 52–42 and held on to a 59–56 win to advance to its first ArenaBowl in franchise history.

=== Orlando Predators ===
The Predators had a much more orthodox run to the ArenaBowl. Orlando finished the season 10–6, won the Southern Division and had the No. 2 seed in the National Conference, earning a bye during the Wild Card Playoffs.

After losing in Week 1 to the Georgia Force, Orlando won its next three games. A two-game losing streak had the team at 4–4, but the Predators won their next five games to move to 9–5. The team ended the regular season losing two of three.

Orlando swept the rival Tampa Bay Storm in two games. The Predators were coached by Jay Gruden, brother of Jon Gruden. Joe Hamilton quarterbacked the team.

In the Divisional Playoffs, Orlando knocked off the Philadelphia Soul in a defensive battle, 31–27. The Soul led for the game's entire first 57 minutes before Orland got the game's final score. In the National Conference Championship, defense also was the key story for Orlando. Traveling to face the Dallas Desperados, Dallas had finished the season 13–3 and were heavy favorites, but the Predators held the Desperados to 28 points, pitching a fourth-quarter shutout and won 45–28.

It was the Predators seventh trip to the ArenaBowl. Orlando was a two-time champion, winning ArenaBowl XII and ArenaBowl XIV

== Game summary ==
=== First quarter ===
The Chicago Rush got off to a 10–0 lead after the first quarter. The Rush received the opening kickoff and quarterback Matt D'Orazio scored on a one-yard run to cap off the first drive. The Orlando Predators fumbled on their first drive, Chicago recovered the loose ball and turned it into a field goal.

=== Second quarter ===
The Predators finally got on board in the second quarter. Orlando quarterback Joe Hamilton connected with Javarus Dudley over the air to cut Chicago's lead to 10–7. The Orlando made up for its first possession fumble, recovering a Rush fumble on the ensuing kickoff. The Predators turned the turnover into a touchdown to take their first lead, 14–10. The teams traded touchdowns throughout the second quarter, in a fast-paced period that saw seven touchdowns alone. Late in the quarter, Rush wide receiver Bobby Sippio caught an eight-yard pass from D'Orazio, and Chicago retook a 31–28 lead. Orlando had one final chance to try a long field goal attempt. The kick was no good, and the Predators were called for a penalty that gave Chicago one un-timed down on offense. The Rush elected to try a 51-yard field goal from kicker Dan Frantz. Frantz hit the kick, giving Chicago a 34–28 lead at the break. It was the fourth straight time Frantz had connected on a long field goal on the last play of the first half, doing so in all three of Chicago's previous playoff games.

=== Third quarter ===
The game turned in the third quarter. Orlando was set to return the second half kickoff, but the ball took a funny bounce off the net, and the Rush recovered. It set Chicago's offense up for another D'Orazio rushing touchdown, and Chicago led 41–28. On the Predator's next drive, Hamilton was picked off by Rush defensive back Dennison Robinson. Robinson returned the interception 44 yards for a touchdown, giving Chicago a 48–28 lead. The Predators got on the board to end the quarter, a Hamilton pass to Dudley to make it 48–34 after Orlando missed the extra point.

=== Fourth quarter ===
The Rush answered with a touchdown of its own to start the final quarter, a 31-yard reception to Sippio. Forced to try to score in a hurry and play catch up, Orlando got a stop on the Rush and scored back to back drives, cutting the score to one-possession 55–47 with 4:04 left in the game. Chicago answered, going up 62–47 on a touchdown pass from D'Orazio to Etu Molden. The play was designed for the ball to be intentionally thrown off the net, and Molden caught the deflection, sliding in the endzone. Orlando would not go home easily. The Predators continued to answer the Rush scores. Three times in the fourth quarter, Orlando cut the Rush lead to one score and scored two touchdowns in the game's final 33 seconds, but that was as close as it could get. Chicago ended the game with its Victory Pass play. Lining up, D'Orazio took the snap and ran around behind the line of scrimmage, finally throwing the ball high into the stands when the pressure came, and the Rush ended the game ahead 69–61.

== Scoring summary ==
=== First quarter ===
CHI - 12:00 - Matt D'Orazio 1 yd TD run (Dan Frantz kick) (CHI 7-0)

CHI - 1:49 - Dan Frantz 23 yd FG (CHI 10-0)

=== Second quarter ===
ORL - 14:22 - 4 yd TD pass from Joe Hamilton to Javarus Dudley (Jay Taylor kick) (CHI 10-7)

ORL - 11:56 - 7 yd TD pass from Joe Hamilton to Javarus Dudley (Taylor kick) (ORL 14-10)

CHI - 10:38 - 24 yd TD pass from Matt D'Orazio to Etu Molden (Frantz kick) (CHI 17-14)

ORL - 8:39 - Khalil Carter 36 yd TD run (Taylor kick) (ORL 21-17)

CHI - 4:39 - 3 yd TD pass from Matt D'Orazio to Bobby Sippio (Frantz kick) (CHI 24-21)

ORL - 2:10 - 30 yd TD pass from Joe Hamilton to DeAndrew Rubin (Taylor kick) (ORL 28-24)

CHI - 0:06 - 8 yd TD pass from Matt D'Orazio to Bobby Sippio (Frantz kick) (CHI 31-28)

CHI - 0:00 - Dan Frantz 51 yd FG (CHI 34-28)

=== Third quarter ===
CHI - 14:31 - Matt D'Orazio 5 yd TD run (Frantz kick) (CHI 41-28)

CHI - 9:07 - Dennison Robinson 44 yd interception return TD (Frantz kick) (CHI 48-28)

ORL - 7:58 - 45 yd TD pass from Joe Hamilton to Javarus Dudley (kick failed) (CHI 48-34)

=== Fourth quarter ===
CHI - 13:09 - 31 yd TD pass from Matt D'Orazio to Bobby Sippio (Frantz kick) (CHI 55-34)

ORL - 9:00 - 11 yd TD pass from Jake Eaton to Jimmy Fryzel (Taylor kick) (CHI 55-41)

ORL - 4:04 - Joe Hamilton 5 yd TD run (kick failed) (CHI 55-47)

CHI - 1:58 - 2 yd TD pass from Matt D'Orazio to Etu Molden (Frantz kick) (CHI 62-47)

ORL - 0:33 - 1 yd TD pass from Joe Hamilton to Javarus Dudley (Taylor kick) (CHI 62-54)

CHI - 0:27 - 15 yd TD pass from Matt D'Orazio to DeJuan Alfonzo (Frantz kick) (CHI 69-54)

ORL - 0:13 - 29 yd TD pass from Joe Hamilton to Charlie Davidson (Taylor kick) (CHI 69-61)
