= 2006 Arena Football League season =

- League: Arena Football League
- Sport: Arena football
- Duration: January 27, 2006 – June 11, 2006

Regular season
- Season champions: Dallas Desperados

AFL playoffs
- National Conference champions: Orlando Predators
- National Conference runners-up: Dallas Desperados
- American Conference champions: Chicago Rush
- American Conference runners-up: San Jose SaberCats

ArenaBowl XX
- Champions: Chicago Rush
- Runners-up: Orlando Predators
- Finals MVP: Matt D'Orazio, CHI

AFL seasons
- ← 2005 2007 →

National: Eastern, Southern
American: Western, Central

The 2006 Arena Football League season was the 20th season of the Arena Football League. The league champions were the Chicago Rush, who defeated the Orlando Predators in ArenaBowl XX.

In the aftermath of Hurricane Katrina, the New Orleans VooDoo franchise suspended operations before the start of the season. However, the league added two teams, the Kansas City Brigade and the Utah Blaze, expanding to 18 teams. The AFL also expanded its playoff format to 12 teams with six teams per conference.

== Standings ==
National Conference
Eastern Division
Team	W	L	PCT	PF	PA	DIV	CON	Home	Away
Dallas Desperados	13	3	.813	929	710	4–2	8–3	6–2	7–1
New York Dragons	10	6	.625	848	887	2–4	6–5	5–3	5–3
Philadelphia Soul	9	7	.563	777	747	3–3	6–5	5–3	4–4
Columbus Destroyers	8	8	.500	724	717	3–3	5–6	4–4	4–4
Southern Division
Team	W	L	PCT	PF	PA	DIV	CON	Home	Away
Orlando Predators	10	6	.625	816	760	6–2	8–4	6–2	4–4
Austin Wranglers	10	6	.625	816	757	5–3	7–5	4–4	6–2
Georgia Force	8	8	.500	855	735	5–3	6–6	4–4	4–4
Tampa Bay Storm	7	9	.438	810	862	4–4	5–7	5–3	2–6
Kansas City Brigade	3	13	.188	704	842	0–8	1–11	2–6	1–7
American Conference
Central Division
Team	W	L	PCT	PF	PA	DIV	CON	Home	Away
Colorado Crush	11	5	.688	903	883	5–1	7–4	6–2	5–3
Nashville Kats	8	8	.500	818	799	3–3	5–6	6–2	2–6
Chicago Rush	7	9	.438	825	824	3–3	7–4	5–3	2–6
Grand Rapids Rampage	5	11	.313	722	875	1–5	5–6	5–3	0–8
Western Division
Team	W	L	PCT	PF	PA	DIV	CON	Home	Away
San Jose SaberCats	10	6	.625	898	849	5–3	6–6	6–2	4–4
Arizona Rattlers	8	8	.500	774	756	5–3	7–5	6–2	2–6
Utah Blaze	7	9	.438	871	904	4–4	6–6	3–5	4–4
Las Vegas Gladiators	5	11	.313	769	895	3–5	5–7	4–4	1–7
Los Angeles Avengers	5	11	.313	809	906	3–5	5–7	4–4	1–7

- Green indicates clinched playoff berth
- Purple indicates division champion
- Grey indicates division champion and conference's best record

Source: ArenaFan.com

== Playoffs ==
All games televised by NBC, except when noted.

5	Chicago	55
5	Chicago	63
4	Nashville	47
1	Colorado	46
American Conference
5	Chicago	59
2	San Jose	56
6	Utah	34	American Conference Championship
3	Arizona	48
3	Arizona	57
2	San Jose	62
Wild-card round
Divisional Playoffs
A5	Chicago	69
N2	Orlando	61
5	Philadelphia	52	ArenaBowl XX
5	Philadelphia	27
4	Austin	35
2	Orlando	31
National Conference
2	Orlando	45
1	Dallas	28
6	Georgia	72	National Conference Championship
6	Georgia	27
3	New York	69
1	Dallas	62

== All-Arena team ==
Position	First team	Second team
Quarterback	Clint Dolezel, Dallas	Joe Hamilton, Orlando
Fullback/Linebacker	Duke Pettijohn, Dallas	Marlion Jackson, Las Vegas
Offensive lineman/Defensive lineman	Colston Weatherington, Dallas; Henry Taylor, Orlando; Jermaine Smith, Georgia	Khreem Smith, Chicago; Ernest Allen, Philadelphia; Joe Minucci, Nashville
Wide receiver/Linebacker	Derek Lee, Georgia	Lawrence Samuels, Tampa Bay
Wide receiver/Defensive back	Randy Gatewood, Arizona	Kevin Ingram, Los Angeles
Offensive specialist	Damian Harrell, Colorado	Siaha Burley, Utah
Defensive specialist	Jerald Brown, Columbus; Eddie Moten, Philadelphia	Rashad Floyd, Colorado; Clevan Thomas, San Jose
Kicker	Remy Hamilton, Los Angeles	Clay Rush, Colorado
