= 2007 Nashville Kats season =

Arena Football League team season

- Head coach: Pat Sperduto
- Home stadium: Gaylord Entertainment Center; Nashville Arena; Sommet Center

Results
- Record: 7–9
- Division place: 4th
- Playoffs: Did not qualify

The 2007 Nashville Kats season was the third season for the franchise since they resumed operations. They looked to make the playoffs again after finishing 2006 with an 8–8 record. They went 7–9 and missed playoffs. This season was also the final season for the Nashville Kats. The team ceased operations again 4 months later.

== Schedule ==
Week	Date	Opponent	Home/Away Game	Result
1	March 1	Columbus Destroyers	Home	L 58–56
2	March 9	Philadelphia Soul	Home	L 63–30
3	March 18	Utah Blaze	Home	W 69–55
4	March 24	Austin Wranglers	Away	W 70–63
5	April 1	Colorado Crush	Away	L 55–48
6	April 7	Chicago Rush	Home	L 66–54
7	April 14	Arizona Rattlers	Away	W 62–36
8	April 21	Kansas City Brigade	Home	W 49–40
9	April 27	Dallas Desperados	Away	L 69–62
10	May 5	Grand Rapids Rampage	Away	L 71–55
11	May 11	Colorado Crush	Home	L 57–35
12	May 19	Chicago Rush	Away	W 44–27
13	May 25	San Jose SaberCats	Home	L 48–34
14		Bye	Week	
15	June 10	Las Vegas Gladiators	Away	W 63–48
16	June 16	Kansas City Brigade	Away	L 66–63
17	June 23	Grand Rapids Rampage	Home	W 57–54

== Coaching ==
Pat Sperduto started his third season of his second stint as head coach of the Kats.

== Stats ==
=== Offense ===
==== Quarterback ====
Player	Comp.	Att.	Comp%	Yards	TD's	INT's	Long	Rating
Jeff Smoker	254	420	60.5	3446	57	17	49	103.7
Matt Kohn	14	26	53.8	192	5	2	28	85.3

==== Running backs ====
Player	Car.	Yards	Avg.	TD's	Long
Dan Alexander	165	426	2.6	41	25
Ahmad Hawkins	6	16	2.7	1	6
Terrell Browden	6	14	2.3	1	3
Matt Kohn	1	12	12	0	12
Jeff Smoker	15	6	.4	3	4
Maurice Brown	1	0	0	0	0
Rocco Forgione	1	0	0	0	0
Rupert Grant	1	0	0	0	0
Kenny Higgins	1	−1	−1	0	−1

==== Wide receivers ====
Player	Rec.	Yards	Avg.	TD's	Long
Kenny Higgins	95	1440	15.2	25	47
Maurice Brown	34	510	15	9	44
C. J. Johnson	34	411	12.5	8	30
Demetris Bendross	15	158	10.5	2	39
Rocco Forgione	14	152	10.9	2	24
Dan Alexander	13	124	9.5	1	18
Carlos Wright	7	64	9.1	1	15
Isaiah Ross	5	50	10	0	19
Terrell Browden	2	21	10.5	1	12
James Baron	2	7	3.5	1	5
Joe Minucci	2	6	3	1	3
Ahmad Hawkins	2	4	2	0	3

==== Touchdowns ====
Player	TD's	Rush	Rec	Ret	Pts
Dan Alexander	42	41	1	0	254
Kenny Higgins	25	0	25	0	150
C. J. Johnson	12	0	8	4	72
Maurice Brown	9	0	9	0	54
Jeff Smoker	3	3	0	0	18
Demetris Bendross	2	0	2	0	12
Terrell Browden	2	1	1	0	12
Rocco Forgione	2	0	2	0	12
Ahmad Hawkins	2	1	0	1	24
James Baron	1	0	1	0	6
Joe Minucci	1	0	1	0	6
Carlos Wright	1	0	1	0	6

=== Defense ===
Player	Tackles	Solo	Assisted	Sack	Solo	Assisted	INT	Yards	TD's	Long
Liam Ezekiel	83.5	59	49	1.5	1	1	0	0	0	0
Ahmad Hawkins	71.5	65	13	0	0	0	13	149	2	48
Keon Raymond	70	59	22	0	0	0	3	30	0	22
Chris Pointer	43	40	6	0	0	0	0	0	0	0
Lynarise Elpheage	32.5	31	3	0	0	0	0	0	0	0
Eric Joyce	18	15	6	0	0	0	0	0	0	0
Maurice Brown	17	11	12	0	0	0	1	5	0	5
Brenden Givan	14	10	8	2	2	0	0	0	0	0
James Baron	13.5	10	7	4	3	2	0	0	0	0
Brian Howard	11	5	12	1	0	2	0	0	0	0
Terrell Browden	9.5	8	3	0	0	0	0	0	0	0
Rupert Grant	8	6	4	1	1	0	0	0	0	0
Howard Hodges	8	7	2	0	0	0	0	0	0	0
Aaron McConnell	7.5	5	5	2.5	2	1	0	0	0	0
Dan Alexander	7	6	2	0	0	0	0	0	0	0
Jason Witczak	6	6	0	0	0	0	0	0	0	0
Anthony Herron	4.5	2	5	0	0	0	0	0	0	0
Joe Minucci	3.5	3	1	1	1	0	0	0	0	0
Carlos Wright	3.5	3	1	0	0	0	0	0	0	0
Carey Clayton	3	3	0	0	0	0	0	0	0	0
C. J. Johnson	3	3	0	0	0	0	0	0	0	0
Jeff Smoker	3	3	0	0	0	0	0	0	0	0
Clarence Curry	2	2	0	0	0	0	0	0	0	0
Kenny Higgins	2	2	0	0	0	0	0	0	0	0
Demetris Bendross	1	1	0	0	0	0	0	0	0	0
Rocco Forgione	1	1	0	0	0	0	0	0	0	0
Clay Harrell	1	1	0	0	0	0	0	0	0	0
Kelvin Ingram	1	1	0	0	0	0	0	0	0	0
Charlie Morris	1	1	0	0	0	0	0	0	0	0
Isaiah Ross	1	1	0	0	0	0	0	0	0	0

=== Special teams ===
==== Kick return ====
Player	Ret	Yards	TD's	Long	Avg	Ret	Yards	TD's	Long	Avg
Maurice Brown	44	748	0	33	17	2	26	0	14	13
C. J. Johnson	24	659	0	57	27.5	2	28	0	22	14
Demetris Bendross	19	380	0	49	20	0	0	0	0	0
Carlos Wright	13	263	0	38	20.2	0	0	0	0	0
Ahmad Hawkins	8	122	1	29	15.3	2	23	0	15	11.5
Lynarise Elpheage	2	32	0	17	16	0	0	0	0	0
Kenny Higgins	3	8	0	7	2.7	0	0	0	0	0
Keon Raymond	1	0	0	0	0	1	0	0	0	0

==== Kicking ====
Player	Extra pt.	Extra pt. Att.	FG	FGA	Long	Pct.	Pts
Jason Witczak	103	112	4	13	57	0.308	115
Liam Ezekiel	0	1	0	0	0	0.000	0

== Regular season ==
=== Week 1: vs Columbus Destroyers ===
Scoring summary:

1st Quarter:

2nd Quarter:

3rd Quarter:

4th Quarter:

=== Week 2: vs Philadelphia Soul ===
Scoring summary:

1st Quarter:

2nd Quarter:

3rd Quarter:

4th Quarter:

=== Week 3: vs Utah Blaze ===
Scoring summary:

1st Quarter:

2nd Quarter:

3rd Quarter:

4th Quarter:

=== Week 4: at Austin Wranglers ===
Scoring summary:

1st Quarter:

2nd Quarter:

3rd Quarter:

4th Quarter:

=== Week 5: at Colorado Crush ===
Scoring summary:

1st Quarter:

2nd Quarter:

3rd Quarter:

4th Quarter:

=== Week 6: vs Chicago Rush ===
Scoring summary:

1st Quarter:

2nd Quarter:

3rd Quarter:

4th Quarter:

=== Week 7: at Arizona Rattlers ===
Scoring summary:

1st Quarter:

2nd Quarter:

3rd Quarter:

4th Quarter:

=== Week 8: vs Kansas City Brigade ===
Scoring summary:

1st Quarter:

2nd Quarter:

3rd Quarter:

4th Quarter:

=== Week 9: at Dallas Desperados ===
Scoring summary:

1st Quarter:

2nd Quarter:

3rd Quarter:

4th Quarter:

=== Week 10: at Grand Rapids Rampage ===
Scoring summary:

1st Quarter:

2nd Quarter:

3rd Quarter:

4th Quarter:

=== Week 11: vs Colorado Crush ===
Scoring summary:

1st Quarter:

2nd Quarter:

3rd Quarter:

4th Quarter:

=== Week 12: at Chicago Rush ===
Scoring summary:

1st Quarter:

2nd Quarter:

3rd Quarter:

4th Quarter:

=== Week 13: vs San Jose SaberCats ===
Scoring summary:

1st Quarter:

2nd Quarter:

3rd Quarter:

4th Quarter:

=== Week 15: at Las Vegas Gladiators ===
Scoring summary:

1st Quarter:

2nd Quarter:

3rd Quarter:

4th Quarter:

=== Week 16: at Kansas City Brigade ===
Scoring summary:

1st Quarter:

2nd Quarter:

3rd Quarter:

4th Quarter:

=== Week 17: vs Grand Rapids Rampage ===
Scoring summary:

1st Quarter:

2nd Quarter:

3rd Quarter:

4th Quarter:
