= 2007 New Orleans VooDoo season =

Arena Football League team season

- Head coach: Mike Neu
- Home stadium: New Orleans Arena

Results
- Record: 5–11
- Division place: 4th
- Playoffs: Did not qualify

The 2007 New Orleans VooDoo season was the third season for the franchise in the Arena Football League. They returned from hiatus in 2006 due to Hurricane Katrina. They went 5-11 and missed the playoffs.

== Schedule ==
Week	Date	Opponent	Home/Away Game	Result
1	March 3	Utah Blaze	Away	L 63–61
2	March 9	Columbus Destroyers	Home	W 52–45
3	March 18	Las Vegas Gladiators	Away	W 59–31
4	March 24	Los Angeles Avengers	Home	L 48–36
5	March 31	Orlando Predators	Home	W 48–45
6	April 7	Tampa Bay Storm	Away	L 66–43
7	April 13	San Jose SaberCats	Home	W 67–54
8	April 21	Austin Wranglers	Away	L 45–38
9	April 27	Georgia Force	Home	L 72–57
10		Bye	Week	
11	May 11	Orlando Predators	Away	L 42–33
12	May 21	Philadelphia Soul	Away	L 78–34
13	May 28	New York Dragons	Home	L 69–63
14	June 2	Tampa Bay Storm	Home	L 61–55
15	June 9	Dallas Desperados	Away	L 80–79
16	June 17	Austin Wranglers	Home	W 66–61
17	June 24	Georgia Force	Home	L 68–42

== Coaching ==
Mike Neu started his third season as head coach of the VooDoo.

== Stats ==
=== Offense ===
==== Quarterback ====
Player	Comp.	Att.	Comp%	Yards	TD's	INT's	Long	Rating
Steve Bellisari	193	307	62.9	2287	47	12	45	107.5
Andy Kelly	264	396	66.7	2580	42	9	38	101.8

==== Running backs ====
Player	Car.	Yards	Avg.	TD's	Long
Dan Curran	27	60	2.2	3	13
Steve Bellisari	30	54	1.8	7	20
James Lynch	26	47	1.8	5	15
Henry Bryant	14	8	0.6	1	2
Kenny Henderson	5	7	1.4	2	6
Andy Kelly	5	0	0	0	0
Wendall Williams	1	−2	−2	0	−2

==== Wide receivers ====
Player	Rec.	Yards	Avg.	TD's	Long
Tyronne Jones	96	1124	11.7	34	32
Kenny Henderson	75	895	11.9	18	43
Wendall Williams	65	648	19	11	45
James Jordan	69	637	9.2	9	43
Tony Locke	36	361	10	2	33
Darnell McDonald	29	302	10.4	3	25
Tremaine Neal	33	266	8.1	3	21
Jacques Rumph	23	266	11.6	4	39
Scott Mitchell	17	184	10.8	1	31
Troy Mason	9	138	15.3	1	33
James Lynch	9	109	12.1	1	31
Dan Curran	4	39	9.8	0	15
Steve Bellisari	2	23	11.5	1	17

==== Touchdowns ====
Player	TD's	Rush	Rec	Ret	Pts
Tyronne Jones	35	0	34	1	210
Kenny Henderson	20	2	18	0	120
Wendall Williams	11	0	11	0	66
James Jordan	9	0	9	0	54
Steve Bellisari	8	7	1	0	48
James Lynch	6	5	1	0	36
Jacques Rumph	5	0	4	1	30
Tremaine Neal	3	0	3	0	24
Dan Curran	3	3	0	0	18
Tony Locke	3	0	2	1	18
Darnell McDonald	3	0	3	0	18
Henry Bryant	1	1	0	0	14
Chris Brown	1	0	0	1	6
Troy Mason	1	0	1	0	6
Scott Mitchell	1	0	1	0	6

=== Defense ===
Player	Tackles	Solo	Assisted	Sack	Solo	Assisted	INT	Yards	TD's	Long
William Haith	66.5	63	7	0	0	0	4	48	0	20
Chris Brown	65.5	62	7	0	0	0	1	0	0	0
Demetrius Derico	42.5	37	11	0	0	0	0	0	0	0
Anthony Floyd	42	37	10	0	0	0	1	11	0	11
Tremaine Neal	39.5	31	17	1	1	0	2	10	0	10
Kelvin Hunter	39	34	10	0	0	0	1	48	1	48
Henry Bryant	21.5	15	13	2.5	2	1	0	0	0	0
Taylor Bryant	20.5	19	3	8	8	0	0	0	0	0
Michael Landry	18.5	17	3	0	0	0	0	0	0	0
Thal Woods	18.5	18	1	0	0	0	0	0	0	0
Michale Spicer	17.5	12	11	1	1	0	0	0	0	0
Talib Wise	9.5	9	1	0	0	0	0	0	0	0
Jeremy Foreman	8.5	7	3	0	0	0	0	0	0	0
Chris Berg	8	8	0	0	0	0	0	0	0	0
James Lynch	7.5	7	1	0	0	0	0	0	0	0
Kenny Henderson	6	6	0	0	0	0	0	0	0	0
Melvin Williams	6	5	2	.5	0	1	0	0	0	0
Eric Houle	4.5	3	3	0	0	0	0	0	0	0
Wilky Bazile	4	3	2	1	1	0	0	0	0	0
Scott Mitchell	3.5	3	1	0	0	0	0	0	0	0
Steve Bellisari	3	2	2	0	0	0	0	0	0	0
Dan Curran	3	3	0	0	0	0	0	0	0	0
James Jordan	3	3	0	0	0	0	0	0	0	0
Jonathan Ruffin	3	3	0	0	0	0	0	0	0	0
Tony Locke	2.5	2	1	0	0	0	0	0	0	0
Antonio Narcisse	2	2	0	0	0	0	0	0	0	0
Wendall Williams	1.5	1	1	0	0	0	0	0	0	0
Troy Mason	1	1	0	0	0	0	0	0	0	0
Richard McCleskey	1	1	0	0	0	0	0	0	0	0
Matt Miller	1	1	0	0	0	0	0	0	0	0
Jacques Rumph	1	1	0	0	0	0	0	0	0	0
Marlon Tickles	1	1	0	0	0	0	0	0	0	0
Darnell McDonald	.5	0	1	0	0	0	0	0	0	0

=== Special teams ===
==== Kick return ====
Player	Ret	Yards	TD's	Long	Avg	Ret	Yards	TD's	Long	Avg
Tyronne Jones	37	605	1	56	16.4	6	121	0	33	20.2
Kenny Henderson	28	536	0	43	19.1	0	0	0	0	0
Tony Locke	9	230	1	56	25.6	0	0	0	0	0
Jacques Rumph	5	111	1	56	22.2	0	0	0	0	0
Wendall Williams	5	101	0	23	20.2	0	0	0	0	0
Troy Mason	2	30	0	21	15	1	7	0	7	7
Chris Brown	5	15	1	7	3	0	0	0	0	0
Tremaine Neal	1	7	0	7	7	0	0	0	0	0
Steve Bellisari	1	1	0	1	1	0	0	0	0	0
Marlon Tickles	0	0	0	0	0	1	0	0	0	0

==== Kicking ====
Player	Extra pt.	Extra pt. Att.	FG	FGA	Long	Pct.	Pts
Eric Houle	58	71	10	20	42	0.500	88
Jonathan Ruffin	39	41	2	3	29	0.667	45
