= 1995 New England Patriots season =

Season of National Football League team the New England Patriots

- Owner: Robert Kraft
- Head coach: Bill Parcells
- Home stadium: Foxboro Stadium

Results
- Record: 6–10
- Division place: 4th AFC East
- Playoffs: Did not qualify
- All-Pros: TE Ben Coates (1st team)
- Pro Bowlers: T Bruce Armstrong; TE Ben Coates; RB Curtis Martin

The 1995 New England Patriots season was the team's 36th, and 26th in the National Football League (NFL). The Patriots finished the season with a record of six wins and ten losses, and finished fourth in the AFC East division. Unlike the previous year, Drew Bledsoe had a poor season by throwing just 13 touchdowns and 16 interceptions and completed just 50.8% of his passes. On the other hand, rookie running back Curtis Martin shined with a Pro Bowl season and would be the Patriots' feature back for two more seasons before being traded to the New York Jets in 1998.

The 1995 Patriots are also the team that has attempted the most passes since at least 1983.

After the season, Vincent Brown retired.

== Offseason ==
| Additions | Subtractions |
|---|---|
| C Jeff Dellenbach (Dolphins) | WR Michael Timpson (Bears) |
| RB Dave Meggett (Giants) | RB Leroy Thompson (Chiefs) |
| LB Bobby Abrams (Vikings) | RB Marion Butts (49ers) |
| | DT Ray Agnew (Giants) |

=== 1995 expansion draft ===
New England Patriots selected during the expansion draft
| Round | Overall | Name | Position | Expansion team |
|---|---|---|---|---|
| 1 | 2 | Rod Smith | Cornerback | Carolina Panthers |
| 12 | 23 | Steve Hawkins | Wide Receiver | Carolina Panthers |
| 26 | 51 | Eugene Chung | Offensive Tackle | Jacksonville Jaguars |

=== 1995 NFL draft ===
1995 New England Patriots draft
| Round | Pick | Player | Position | College | Notes |
| 1 | 23 | Ty Law * ^{†} | Cornerback | Michigan | |
| 2 | 57 | Ted Johnson | Linebacker | Colorado | |
| 3 | 74 | Curtis Martin * ^{†} | Running back | Pittsburgh | |
| 3 | 88 | Jimmy Hitchcock | Cornerback | North Carolina | |
| 4 | 112 | Dave Wohlabaugh | Center | Syracuse | |
| 6 | 195 | Dino Philyaw | Running back | Oregon | |
| 7 | 234 | Carlos Yancy | Cornerback | Georgia | |
Made roster † Pro Football Hall of Fame * Made at least one Pro Bowl during career

=== Undrafted free agents ===
1995 undrafted free agents of note
| Player | Position | College |
|---|---|---|
| Daniel Adams | Wide receiver | Houston |
| Eric Alford | Tight end | Nebraska |
| David Andrews | Wide receiver | Angelo State |
| Kendricke Bullard | Wide receiver | Arkansas State |
| Eddie Cade | Safety | Arizona State |
| Alcide Catanho | Linebacker | Rutgers |
| Hason Graham | Wide receiver | Georgia |
| David Green | Running back | Boston College |
| Rupert Grant | Fullback | Howard |
| Sean Holcomb | Defensive end | Texas A&M–Kingsville |
| Greg Landry | Guard | Boston College |
| Jeff Parker | Linebacker | Albany State |
| Andre President | Tight end | Angelo State |
| Dwayne Provo | Cornerback | St. Mary's-Canada |
| Jim Stayer | Quarterback | New Hampshire |
| Mike Suarez | Tackle | Illinois |
| Brian White | Safety | Dartmouth |
| Byron Wright | Linebacker | Texas Tech |

== Personnel ==
=== Staff ===
1995 New England Patriots staff
| Front office: Owner and Chief Executive Officer – Robert Kraft; Vice President and Owner's Representative – Jonathan Kraft; Vice President of Business Operations – Andy Wasynczuk; Director of Player Personnel – Bobby Grier; Director of College Scouting – Charley Armey; Scouting Consultant – Bucko Kilroy; Assistant Director of Pro Scouting – Dave Uyrus; Head coaches: Head Coach – Bill Parcells; Offensive coaches: Offensive Coordinator/Quarterbacks – Ray Perkins; Running Backs – Charlie Weis; Wide Receivers – Chris Palmer; Tight Ends – Mike Pope; Offensive Line – Fred Hoaglin; Offensive Assistant/Running Backs/Special Teams – Maurice Carthon | Defensive coaches: Defensive Coordinator/Linebackers – Al Groh; Defensive Line – Romeo Crennel; Defensive Assistant/Linebackers – Dante Scarnecchia; Defensive Backs – Bob Trott; Special teams coaches: Special Teams – Mike Sweatman; Strength and conditioning: Strength and Conditioning – Johnny Parker |

== Roster ==
1995 New England Patriots roster
| Quarterbacks (QB): 7 Jay Barker; 11 Drew Bledsoe; 16 Scott Zolak; Running backs (RB): 26 Corey Croom; 33 Sam Gash FB; 34 Rupert Grant; 28 Curtis Martin; 22 Dave Meggett; Wide receivers (WR): 82 Vincent Brisby; 80 Troy Brown; 81 Hason Graham; 86 Kevin Lee; 83 Will Moore; Tight ends (TE): 85 John Burke; 87 Ben Coates | Offensive linemen (OL): 78 Bruce Armstrong T; 66 Jeff Dellenbach C; 67 Mike Gisler G; 77 Pat Harlow T; 61 Bob Kratch G; 68 Max Lane T; 76 William Roberts G; 71 Todd Rucci G; 64 Dave Wohlabaugh C; Defensive linemen (DL): 98 Troy Barnett DE; 92 Ferric Collons DE; 60 Sean Holcomb DE; 97 Aaron Jones DE; 96 Mike Jones; 94 Tim Roberts DE; 91 Bruce Walker NT; 90 Reggie White NT | Linebackers (LB): 50 Bobby Abrams LB; 59 Vincent Brown ILB; 54 Al Catanho OLB; 52 Ted Johnson ILB; 55 Willie McGinest OLB; 58 Marty Moore ILB; 95 Dwayne Sabb OLB; 53 Chris Slade OLB; Defensive backs (DB): 30 Corwin Brown S; 41 Eddie Cade SS; 29 Myron Guyton FS; 31 Jimmy Hitchcock CB; 24 Ty Law CB; 43 Vernon Lewis CB; 23 Terry Ray SS; 21 Ricky Reynolds CB; 25 Larry Whigham FS; 40 Carlos Yancy CB; Special teams (ST): 3 Matt Bahr K; 99 Steve DeOssie LS; 9 Bryan Wagner P | Practice squad None Reserve: 51 Andre Bowden LB (IR); 38 David Green RB (IR); 18 Bill Schroeder WR (IR); 53 active, 3 inactive, 0 practice squad Rookies in italics |

== Regular season ==
=== Schedule ===
| Week | Date | Opponent | Result | Record | Venue | Attendance |
|---|---|---|---|---|---|---|
| 1 | September 3 | Cleveland Browns | **W** 17–14 | 1–0 | Foxboro Stadium | 60,126 |
| 2 | September 10 | **Miami Dolphins** | **L** 3–20 | 1–1 | Foxboro Stadium | 60,239 |
| 3 | September 17 | at San Francisco 49ers | **L** 3–28 | 1–2 | 3Com Park | 66,179 |
| 4 | Bye | | | | | |
| 5 | October 1 | at Atlanta Falcons | **L** 17–30 | 1–3 | Georgia Dome | 47,114 |
| 6 | October 8 | Denver Broncos | **L** 3–37 | 1–4 | Foxboro Stadium | 60,074 |
| 7 | October 15 | at Kansas City Chiefs | **L** 26–31 | 1–5 | Arrowhead Stadium | 77,992 |
| 8 | October 23 | **Buffalo Bills** | **W** 27–14 | 2–5 | Foxboro Stadium | 60,203 |
| 9 | October 29 | Carolina Panthers | **L** 17–20 | 2–6 | Foxboro Stadium | 60,064 |
| 10 | November 5 | at **New York Jets** | **W** 20–7 | 3–6 | Giants Stadium | 61,462 |
| 11 | November 12 | at **Miami Dolphins** | **W** 34–17 | 4–6 | Joe Robbie Stadium | 70,399 |
| 12 | November 19 | **Indianapolis Colts** | **L** 10–24 | 4–7 | Foxboro Stadium | 59,544 |
| 13 | November 26 | at **Buffalo Bills** | **W** 35–25 | 5–7 | Rich Stadium | 69,384 |
| 14 | December 3 | New Orleans Saints | **L** 17–31 | 5–8 | Foxboro Stadium | 59,876 |
| 15 | December 10 | **New York Jets** | **W** 31–28 | 6–8 | Foxboro Stadium | 46,617 |
| 16 | December 16 | at Pittsburgh Steelers | **L** 27–41 | 6–9 | Three Rivers Stadium | 57,158 |
| 17 | December 23 | at **Indianapolis Colts** | **L** 7–10 | 6–10 | RCA Dome | 54,685 |
Note: Intra-division opponents are in **bold** text.

=== Game summaries ===
==== Week 13 ====
| Team | 1 | 2 | 3 | 4 | Total |
|---|---|---|---|---|---|
| • Patriots | 3 | 7 | 3 | 22 | 35 |
| Bills | 3 | 16 | 6 | 0 | 25 |

- Date: November 26
- Location: Rich Stadium, Orchard Park, New York
- Game start: 1:00 p.m.
- Game weather: Cloudy; 36 °F (2 °C); wind 8 mph (13 km/h)

Scoring summary
| Q1 | BUF | Steve Christie 31 yard field goal | BUF 3–0 |
| Q1 | NE | Matt Bahr 29 yard field goal | Tie 3–3 |
| Q2 | NE | Ben Coates 6 yard pass from Drew Bledsoe (Matt Bahr kick) | NE 10–3 |
| Q2 | BUF | Bill Brooks 32 yard pass from Jim Kelly (kick failed) | NE 10–9 |
| Q2 | BUF | Steve Christie 48 yard field goal | BUF 12–10 |
| Q2 | BUF | Cornelius Bennett 69 yard interception return (Steve Christie kick) | BUF 19–10 |
| Q3 | NE | Matt Bahr 43 yard field goal | BUF 19–13 |
| Q3 | BUF | Thurman Thomas 1 yard run (run failed) | BUF 25–13 |
| Q4 | NE | Ben Coates 4 yard pass from Drew Bledsoe (Matt Bahr kick) | BUF 25–20 |
| Q4 | NE | Ben Coates 15 yard pass from Drew Bledsoe (Curtis Martin pass from Drew Bledsoe) | NE 28–25 |
| Q4 | NE | Chris Slade 27 yard interception return (Matt Bahr kick) | NE 35–25 |

=== Standings ===
AFC East
| | W | L | T | PCT | PF | PA | STK |
|---|---|---|---|---|---|---|---|
| ^{(3)} Buffalo Bills | 10 | 6 | 0 | .625 | 350 | 335 | L1 |
| ^{(5)} Indianapolis Colts | 9 | 7 | 0 | .563 | 331 | 316 | W1 |
| ^{(6)} Miami Dolphins | 9 | 7 | 0 | .563 | 398 | 332 | W1 |
| New England Patriots | 6 | 10 | 0 | .375 | 294 | 377 | L2 |
| New York Jets | 3 | 13 | 0 | .188 | 233 | 384 | L4 |

== See also ==
- New England Patriots seasons
