= Isaiah Ross =

Isaiah Ross may refer to:

- Doctor Ross, Isaiah "Doc" Ross. (1925–1993), American blues musician
- Isaiah Ross (American football) (born 1981), American football guard
- Isaiah Ross (basketball) (born 1996), American basketball player
