= Matt Kohn =

American football player and coach (born 1981)

Personal information
- Born: September 27, 1981 (age 45)
- Listed height: 6 ft 2 in (1.88 m)
- Listed weight: 205 lb (93 kg)

Career information
- Position: Quarterback
- High school: Adrian (Adrian, Michigan)
- College: Indianapolis

Career history

Playing
- Ohio Valley Greyhounds (2006); Nashville Kats (2007); Kansas City Brigade (2008)

Coaching
- Indianapolis (2005–2008) Quarterbacks coach; Siena Heights (2011–2015) Defensive coordinator & linebackers coach; Siena Heights (2016) Interim head coach; Siena Heights (2017–2025) Head coach

Awards and highlights
- UIF Offensive Player of the Year (2006)

Career AFL statistics
- Comp. / Att.: 33 / 62
- Passing yards: 473
- TD–INT: 9–4
- Passer rating: 87.63
- Rushing TDs: 2
- Stats at ArenaFan.com

Head coaching record
- Career: 50–44 (.532)

Matt Kohn (born September 27, 1981) is a former American college football coach and player and current high school athletic director. He served as the head football coach for Siena Heights University, a position he held on an interim basis in 2016 and full-time from 2017 to 2025, when the university shut down. Kohn played as a quarterback for two seasons in the Arena Football League with the Nashville Kats and Kansas City Brigade. He played college football at the University of Indianapolis. He was also a member of the Ohio Valley Greyhounds of United Indoor Football.

== Early life ==
Kohn played high school football at Adrian High School in Adrian, Michigan. The Maples finished 11–1 his senior year and the school's first ever 9–0 regular season record. He finished the year throwing for 2,294 yards and 29 TDs, adding 290 yards and eight TDs on the ground. He was named to the Detroit Free Press All-State Dream Team. He was the starting quarterback for the West team in the Michigan High School Coaches Association All-Star football game. He also played basketball being named one of the top 100 players in the state before the start of his senior season by the Detroit Free Press. He was named 2nd team all-state.

== College career ==
Kohn played for the Indianapolis Greyhounds of the University of Indianapolis. In 2003, he set school records for passing attempts, completions, yards, and TDs when he completed 239 passes on 290 attempts for 3,314 yards and 21 TDs. He was a nominee for the Harlon Hill Trophy in 2003. He was named 2nd team all-conference in 2003 and honorable mention in 2002.

=== College statistics ===
Season	Team	Passing							Rushing			
Season	Team	Cmp	Att	Pct	Yds	Y/A	TD	Int	Att	Yds	Avg	TD
2001	Indianapolis	44	86	51.2	623	7.5	6	1	30	−54	−1.8	0
2002	Indianapolis	197	312	62.1	2255	7.2	17	18	91	407	2.1	5
2003	Indianapolis	239	390	61.3	3314	8.4	21	15	97	327	0.7	4
2004	Indianapolis	172	322	53.4	2,322	7.2	11	18	97	442	2.1	2
Career		652	1,110	57	8,514	7.5	55	52	315	1,122	0.7	11

== Professional career ==
Kohn played for the Ohio Valley Greyhounds of United Indoor Football (UIF) in 2006. He was named the UIF Offensive Player of the Year.

Kohn signed with the Nashville Kats on October 13, 2006. He played for the Kansas City Brigade in 2008.

=== AFL statistics ===
Year	Team	Passing							Rushing		
Year	Team	Cmp	Att	Pct	Yds	TD	Int	Rtg	Att	Yds	TD
2007	Nashville	14	26	53.8	192	5	2	85.26	1	12	0
2008	Kansas City	19	36	52.8	281	4	2	83.22	8	58	2
Career		33	62	53.2	473	9	4	87.63	9	70	2

== Coaching career ==
Kohn was quarterbacks coach at the University of Indianapolis from 2006 to 2008. He has since served as an assistant head coach, defensive coordinator and inside linebackers coach at Siena Heights University. In May 2016, he was named the interim head coach of the Siena Heights Saints for the 2016 season. On December 6, 2016, it was announced that Kohn would continue as the team's permanent head coach.

== Head coaching record ==
Year	Team	Overall	Conference	Standing	Bowl/playoffs	NAIA^{#}
Siena Heights Saints (Mid-States Football Association) (2016–2025)
2016	Siena Heights	5–5	2–4	T–4th (MEL)		
2017	Siena Heights	5–5	3–3	4th (MEL)		
2018	Siena Heights	7–3	3–3	4th (MEL)		25
2019	Siena Heights	7–3	3–3	T–4th (MEL)		20
2020–21	Siena Heights	2–2	1–2	5th (MEL)		
2021	Siena Heights	5–5	4–3	4th (MEL)		
2022	Siena Heights	5–5	4–3	T–3rd (MEL)		
2023	Siena Heights	6–4	4–3	T–4th (MEL)		
2024	Siena Heights	3–7	2–3	4th (MEL)		
2025	Siena Heights	5–5	3–2	3rd (MEL)		
Siena Heights:		50–44	29–29			
Total:		50–44				
