= Tony Locke =

Tony Locke may refer to:

- Tony Locke (American football)
- Tony Locke (politician)

== See also ==
- Tony Lock, English cricketer
- Tony Lock (footballer), English footballer
