= Margaret Wynne Lawless =

American poet

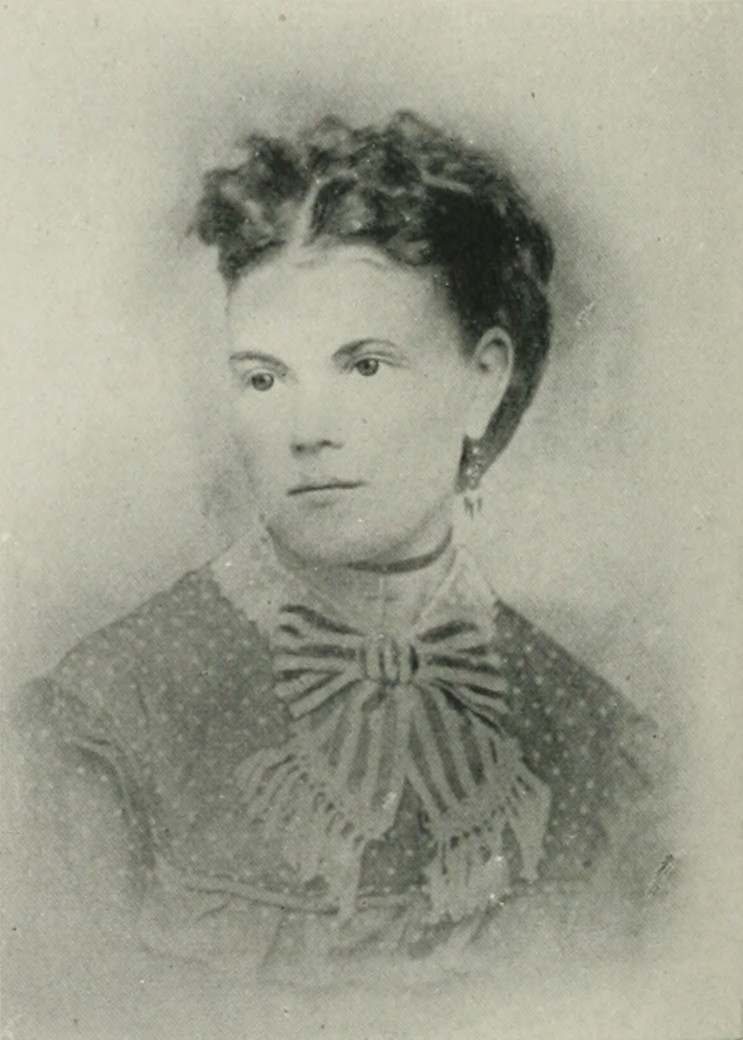
- Photo in A Woman of the Century
- Born: Margaret Wynne; July 14, 1847; Adrian, Michigan, U.S.
- Died: January 18, 1926 (aged 78); Toledo, Ohio, U.S.
- Resting place: Calvary Cemetery, Toledo
- Education: Adrian High School
- Occupations: Poet, author, educator, philanthropist
- Spouse: James Thomas Lawless (m. 1873)
- Children: 8
- Writing career
- Language: English

Margaret Wynne Lawless (née, Wynne; July 14, 1847 – January 18, 1926) was an American poet, author, educator, and philanthropist. She contributed to the Catholic World, Ave Maria, Rosary Magazine, Pilot, New World, and conducted the children's department for a number of years of the Catholic Universe. Lawless also contributed to Frank Leslie's Illustrated Newspaper, Demorest Monthly Magazine, The American Magazine, Lippincott's Monthly Magazine, Golden Days for Boys and Girls, Detroit Free Press and Travelers' Record. She was active in the cause of Catholic education and the development of Catholic charitable, literary and socialistic societies and institutions. Lawless incorporated and took out a charter for the Catholic Ladies of Ohio, the first insurance and benevolent society for women in the United States.

== Early life and education ==
Margaret Wynne was born in Adrian, Michigan, July 14, 1847. She was a daughter of John and Jane Meehan Wynne, both Irish Catholics. She passed her childhood and youth in Adrian.

She was educated in the public schools of Adrian, receiving in the Adrian High School a full collegiate classical and mathematical course modeled after the Amherat plan, attaining at an early age great proficiency, especially in the classics, Latin and Greek, and graduating when fourteen years old. Up to that time, she had shown no especial literary taste, but when she went back to her alma mater to take a post-graduate course, she intermingled with her studies a rhymed translation of the first of the Satires of Horace.

== Career ==
After graduating from school she taught for several years.

In 1873, she married Dr. James Thomas Lawless (1844–1932), a practicing physician in Toledo, Ohio. They made their home in Toledo, and had eight sons.

She began writing poetry in 1886, sending poems and fiction to eastern magazines, where they found ready acceptance and fair remuneration. A few years passed, and then a nearly mortal illness forced her to give up writing, as she supposed, forever.

After several years of raising a family, she again set forth her work as a writer, this time with a clearer perception of the meaning of life, with a better understanding of her own powers, and with higher purposes. Before, she wrote for the mere pleasure of writing, with her later writings there was a message for her to deliver, and it came most readily and clearly in lines glowing with poetic fervor.

Lawless was not a prolific writer, but her name was not uncommon in many of the leading magazines and papers of the U.S. in her time, such as The Catholic World, Ave Maria, Rosary Magazine, Pilot, New World, Catholic Universe (of which she conducted the Children's Department for a number of years). She also wrote for secular publications, such as Our Youth, Frank Leslie's Weekly, Weekly Wisconsin, Demorest's, American Magazine, Lippincott's, Golden Days, Detroit Free Press, and Traveler's Record. She never published a book of her poems, but was engaged in compiling her writings with that end in view.

Lawless and her husband were active workers in the cause of Catholic education and the development of Catholic charitable, literary and socialistic societies and institutions. She incorporated and took out a charter for the Catholic Ladies of Ohio, the first insurance and benevolent society for women in the U.S., and was for six yearsm secretary of this organization.

Lawless died January 18, 1926, in Toledo, and was buried in that town's Calvary Cemetery.

== See also ==
- List of people from Adrian, Michigan
