= Keel Hunt =

American journalist and author (born 1948)

Sherman McKeel "Keel" Hunt III (born February 27, 1948) is an American journalist and author. He serves as a columnist for The Tennessean newspaper in Nashville, Tennessee, and has written multiple books, mostly about Tennessee political history.

== Biography ==
Keel Hunt was born on February 27, 1948, in Nashville, Tennessee, to Sherman McKeel Hunt Jr. and Ellis Reeder Hooper Hunt. He attended Stratford High School in Nashville, and graduated from Middle Tennessee State University (MTSU) in 1971. He received a masters degree in journalism from the Medill School of Journalism at Northwestern University in 1975. During his career as a journalist, he worked as a reporter, editorial writer, city editor, and Washington correspondent. He also served in the National Guard from 1967 to 1973. In 1977, he became a speechwriter for Lamar Alexander's 1978 campaign for Governor of Tennessee, and worked as a special assistant to Alexander during his terms as governor. He served as staff director of the Nashville Area Chamber of Commerce and founded a Nashville public affairs firm called Strategy Group. In 1987, President Ronald Reagan appointed Hunt to the Executive Committee of the National Summit Conference on Education. In addition to his work as a columnist at The Tennessean, he is also a political blogger. Hunt was awarded the Distinguished Alumni Award by the MTSU Alumni Association in 2025.

As an author, Hunt has written three books on Tennessee political history. His 2013 book Coup: The Day the Democrats Ousted Their Governor, Put Republican Lamar Alexander in Office Early, and Stopped a Pardon Scandal chronicles how the Tennessee General Assembly, under the control of the Democratic Party, removed outgoing Governor and fellow Democrat Ray Blanton, who was embroiled in various scandals, three days early; and swore in Republican Lamar Alexander. Hunt's 2018 book Crossing the Aisle: How Bipartisanship Brought Tennessee to the Twenty-First Century and Could Save America is about the various bipartisan collaborations in the Tennessee General Assembly in the later 20th and early 21st centuries. He argues that this bipartisan cooperation can be a model for overcoming the various contemporary political divisions that exist in the United States. Hunt's most recent work was published in 2023 and is titled A Sense of Justice: Judge Gilbert S. Merritt and His Times. This book is a biography of Gilbert S. Merritt Jr., a long time judge from Tennessee on the United States Court of Appeals for the Sixth Circuit. In 2021, Hunt published The Family Business: How Ingram Transformed the World of Books which chronicles the history of the Ingram Content Group, a publishing company based in Nashville.
