= Corey Johnson (American football) =

American football player (born 1973)

No. 27
- Position: Defensive back

Personal information
- Born: September 23, 1973 (age 53); Forest Park, Georgia, U.S.

Career information
- College: Georgia

Career history
- Nashville Kats (1998–1999); Los Angeles Avengers (2000); Buffalo Destroyers (2000); Carolina Cobras (2001); Buffalo Destroyers (2002); New York Dragons (2003–2005); Arizona Rattlers (2006)

Awards and highlights
- First-team All-Arena (1998); Second-team All-SEC (1995)

Career AFL statistics
- Tackles: 346
- Interceptions: 40
- Touchdowns: 6
- Stats at ArenaFan.com

Corey Johnson (born September 23, 1973) is an American former professional football defensive back who played in the Arena Football League (AFL). He played college football at Georgia.

Johnson played for the Nashville Kats, Los Angeles Avengers, Buffalo Destroyers, Carolina Cobras, New York Dragons, and Arizona Rattlers. On April 10, 2005, Johnson; playing for the Dragons in a game against the L.A. Avengers, was the recipient of a tackle by Al Lucas, that resulted in Lucas' death from a spinal cord injury.
