= Adrian High School (Michigan) =

Public school in Adrian, Michigan, United States

Location
- 785 Riverside Avenue; Adrian, Michigan 49221; United States; 41°54′46″N 84°03′01″W

Information
- Type: Public secondary school
- Established: 1857
- School district: Adrian Public Schools
- Superintendent: Nate Parker
- Principal: Sam Skeels
- Teaching staff: 39.99 (on an FTE basis)
- Grades: 9–12
- Enrollment: 804 (2023–2024)
- Student to teacher ratio: 20.11
- Colors: Royal blue White
- Athletics: MHSAA Class B
- Athletics conference: Southeastern Conference
- Nickname: Maples
- Yearbook: Sickle
- Website: www.adrianmaples.org/schools/adrian-high-school.php

Adrian High School is a public secondary school in Adrian, Michigan, United States. It serves students in grades 9–12 for the Adrian Public Schools.

== Academics ==
Adrian High School is an International Baccalaureate world school.

== Demographics ==
The demographic breakdown of the 798 students enrolled for the 2018-19 school year was:

- Male - 52.0%
- Female - 48.0%
- Native American/Alaskan - 0.5%
- Asian - 2.6%
- Black - 6.1%
- Hispanic - 32.1%
- White - 53.1%
- Multiracial - 5.5%

46.5% of the students were eligible for free or reduced-cost lunch. For 2018-19, Adrian was a Title I school.

== Athletics ==
Adrian's Maples compete in the Southeastern Conference. School colors are royal blue and white. The following Michigan High School Athletic Association (MHSAA) sanctioned sports are offered:

- Baseball (boys)
- Basketball (girls and boys)
- Bowling (girls and boys)
- Competitive cheerleading (girls)
- Cross country (girls and boys)
- Football (boys)
- Golf (girls and boys)
- Gymnastics (girls)
- Ice hockey (boys)
- Soccer (girls and boys)
- Softball (girls)
- Swim and dive (girls and boys)
- Tennis (girls and boys)
- Track and field (girls and boys)
- Volleyball (girls)
- Wrestling (boys)
  - State champion - 1973

== Notable alumni ==
- Rachel Andresen, (1907–1988), founder, Youth For Understanding
- Kirk Baily, (1963–2022), actor
- Marcus Benard, NFL defensive end
- Kellen Davis, NFL tight end
- Dorne Dibble, (1929–2018), NFL wide receiver
- Matt Kohn, National Association of Intercollegiate Athletics head football coach
- Margaret Wynne Lawless, (1847–1926), poet, author, educator, philanthropist
- Mike Marshall, (1943–2021), Major League Baseball pitcher
- William Reid, (1893–1955), college basketball coach and administrator
- Mattie Montgomery, former lead vocalist and frontman of Christian metal band For Today.
- Richard Haddad, president and CEO of the Detroit Lions.
