= Jason Witczak =

American football player (born 1978)

No. 11
- Position: Placekicker

Personal information
- Born: May 24, 1978 (age 48); North Fond du Lac, Wisconsin, U.S.
- Listed height: 6 ft 1 in (1.85 m)
- Listed weight: 195 lb (88 kg)

Career information
- High school: North Fond du Lac (WI) Horace Mann
- College: Southeast Missouri State
- NFL draft: 2001: undrafted

Career history
- Tennessee Titans (2001–2002)*; Rhein Fire (2002); Buffalo Bills (2003)*; Barcelona Dragons (2003); Arizona Rattlers (2004); Nashville Kats (2006–2007); Arizona Rattlers (2008–2011)
- * Offseason or practice squad member only

Awards and highlights
- Nashville Kats Franchise Record 57-yard FG
- Stats at ArenaFan.com

Jason Witczak (born May 24, 1978) is an American football player. He was a kicker who played for the Arizona Rattlers of the Arena Football League (AFL). Witczak has also spent time on the rosters of the Tennessee Titans and the Buffalo Bills.

== College career ==
An all-conference wide receiver, safety and punter at Horace Mann High School in North Fond du Lac, Wisconsin, Witczak attended the University of Wisconsin–Green Bay, where he played on the golf team. Because the school did not have a football program, Witczak transferred to Marshall University in 1998 to play both sports. He played his sophomore and junior seasons at Marshall University, where he was the long distance field goal kicker and his longest kick was 46 yards.

Witczak then transferred to Southeast Missouri State University, where he was named to the 2000 Football Gazette NCAA Division I-AA All-American Team as a punter, and had a nation-leading 41.3 net punting average. Witczak punted 48 times for 1983 yards with 15 punts inside the 20-yard line, also connecting on 5 of 9 field goals with a long of 44.

== Professional career ==
=== 2004 ===
Witczak began his AFL career as a mid-season replacement for the Arizona Rattlers. During his first AFL game, he suffered a season-ending injury after tearing his ACL on a kickoff. He was placed on injured reserve for the rest of the 2004 season. He spent the 2005 preseason with the Rattlers, but was released before the regular season began.

=== 2006 ===
Witczak was signed as a mid-season replacement for the Nashville Kats, where he played in 7 games, hitting 4-11 (36.4%) field goals and 41-46 (89.1%) points after touchdown.

=== 2007 ===
Witczak broke a Kats record for the longest field goal in a game, completing a 57-yard field goal. He finished the season 4-13 (30.8%) for field goals and 91.2% (103-113) for points after touchdown. His percentage on XPAT's tied him for 8th in the AFL.

=== 2008 ===
Witczak went 15-16 on points after touchdown and 0-2 on field goals before tearing the ACL in his kicking leg in week 3 against the San Jose SaberCats. He was placed on the injured reserve list and did not play again that season.

=== 2010 ===
Witczak went 39 of 42 (93%) on points after touchdown and 2 for 3 on field goals with a longest field goal of 45 yards before being replaced by Fabrizio Scaccia.

=== 2011 ===
Witczak was re-signed by the Arizona Rattlers for the last week of the season and the playoffs as a result of Fabrizio Scaccia's return to the San Francisco 49ers after the lockout ended. He hit 7 of 8 extra points in the last game of the regular season, and was 0 for 1 on field goals and 24 of 26 on extra points during the Rattlers run to the Arena Bowl, where they lost to the Jacksonville Sharks 73-70 on the last play of the game. Going 10-10 in the game on extra points set an Arena Bowl Record.

== Golf career ==
Witczak received instruction from Manuel de la Torre in his home state of Wisconsin, playing in junior tournaments there. He is a Class A PGA Professional who taught from 2003 to 2009 in Phoenix at the JW Marriott Desert Ridge at Wildfire Golf Club before becoming a part-owner at Adobe Dam Family Golf Center in Glendale, Arizona, where he taught golf from 2009 to 2013. He is now the Director of Instruction for John Jacobs' Lesson and Instruction programs at Orange Tree Golf Club in Scottsdale, Arizona.

In 2004, Witczak won the Titleist/Foot Joy Assistant Pro Championship. In the 2007 Remax World Long Drive, he finished 13th in the world, with a drive of 404 yards. He captured his first long drive title in 2011, winning the Sife Professional Long Drive Title in McKinney, Texas. In 2011 and 2012 he was runner-up in the Southwest Section Match Play Championship. He qualified for the 2012 PGA Professional National Championship.

Preceded by Clay Rush	Arizona Rattlers Placekickers; 2008–2010	Succeeded by Fabrizio Scaccia
Preceded by Jason Ball	Nashville Kats Placekickers; 2006–2007	Succeeded by Team Folded
Preceded by Nelson Garner	Arizona Rattlers Placekickers; 2004–2004	Succeeded by Nelson Garner
