= David Green (running back, born 1972) =

American football player (born 1972)

Profile
- Position: Running back

Personal information
- Born: April 8, 1972 (age 54); Mount Kisco, New York

Career information
- College: Boston College

Career history
- New England Patriots (1995)

Career NFL statistics
- Games played: 2
- Rushes: 0
- Stats at Pro Football Reference

David G. Green (born April 18, 1972) is a former running back in the National Football League. He played in 1995 for the New England Patriots. He played college football for the Boston College Eagles.
