= Jamie Coleman =

American football player (born 1975)

No. 12
- Position: Defensive specialist

Personal information
- Born: June 16, 1975 (age 51)
- Listed height: 5 ft 9 in (1.75 m)
- Listed weight: 180 lb (82 kg)

Career information
- College: Appalachian State (1993–1995)
- NFL draft: 1996: undrafted

Career history
- Charlotte Rage (1996)*; Minnesota Vikings (1996)*; Nashville Kats (1997); Frankfurt Galaxy (1997)*; Tampa Bay Storm (2001–2002)
- * Offseason or practice squad member only

Awards and highlights
- Second-team All-Arena (1997)

Career AFL statistics
- Tackles: 108.5
- Pass breakups: 36
- Interceptions: 4
- Force fumbles: 4
- Total TDs: 1
- Stats at ArenaFan.com

Jamie Coleman (born June 16, 1975) is an American former professional football defensive specialist who played three seasons in the Arena Football League (AFL) with the Nashville Kats and Tampa Bay Storm. He played college football at Appalachian State University.

== Early life and college ==
Jamie Coleman was born on June 16, 1975. He played college football for the Appalachian State Mountaineers of Appalachian State University from 1993 to 1995. He skipped his senior year to enter the 1996 NFL draft.

== Professional career ==
Coleman signed with the Charlotte Rage of the Arena Football League (AFL) for the 1996 AFL season. He was waived by the Rage in mid April 1996.

Coleman signed with the Minnesota Vikings in April 1996 after going undrafted in the 1996 NFL draft. He was cut by the Vikings on August 20, 1996.

In November 1996, Coleman was selected by the Nashville Kats in the 1996 AFL expansion draft. In February 1997, he was selected by the Frankfurt Galaxy of the World League of American Football (WLAF) in the 1997 WLAF draft. However, he was later released. Coleman played in 13 games for the Kats during the 1997 season as a defensive specialist, recording 36 solo tackles, 13 assisted tackles, three forced fumbles, one fumble recovery, 12 pass breakups, and four interceptions that he returned for 38 yards and a touchdown. The Kats finished the year with a 10–4 record and lost in the quarterfinals of the playoffs to the Tampa Bay Storm by a score of 52–49. Coleman was named second-team All-Arena for his performance during the 1997 season.

Coleman signed with the Tampa Bay Storm of the AFL on October 26, 2000. He was placed on injured reserve on June 23, 2001, and activated on July 11, 2001. Overall, he played in ten games for the Storm during the 2001 season, totaling 55 solo tackles, 22 assisted tackles, one forced fumble, one fumble recovery, and 24 pass breakups. Coleman re-signed with the Storm on April 15, 2002. He started the first game of the 2002 season, but did not record any statistics, and was released on April 24, 2002.
