= Dan Alexander (fullback) =

American football player (born 1978)

No. 36, 38, 39
- Position: Fullback

Personal information
- Born: March 17, 1978 (age 48); Chicago, Illinois, U.S.
- Listed height: 6 ft 0 in (1.83 m)
- Listed weight: 265 lb (120 kg)

Career information
- High school: Wentzville (MO) Holt
- College: Nebraska
- NFL draft: 2001: 6th round, 192nd overall pick

Career history
- Tennessee Titans (2001); Jacksonville Jaguars (2002); St. Louis Rams (2003); Nashville Kats (2004–2007); Chicago Rush (2008); Alabama Vipers (2010)

Awards and highlights
- 2× First-team All-Arena (2007, 2010); AFL All-Rookie Team (2005); National champion (1997); First-team All-Big 12 (2000); Alamo Bowl MVP (2000)

Career AFL statistics
- Rushing yards: 1,188
- Rushing touchdowns: 92
- Receiving yards: 414
- Receiving touchdowns: 9
- Tackles: 48
- Stats at ArenaFan.com
- Stats at Pro Football Reference

Daniel Edward Alexander (born March 17, 1978) is an American former professional football player who was a fullback in the National Football League (NFL). He played college football for the Nebraska Cornhuskers and was selected by the Tennessee Titans in the sixth round of the 2001 NFL draft.

Alexander also played for the Jacksonville Jaguars, St. Louis Rams, Nashville Kats and Chicago Rush.

== Early life and education ==
Alexander attended Wentzville Holt High School and was a letterman in football, wrestling, and track. He won the Missouri state wrestling title at Heavyweight in 1996

== College career ==
Alexender attended the University of Nebraska–Lincoln, where he was a four-year letterman. While there, he rushed for 2,456 yards and 20 touchdowns in 38 career games. He was named the Offensive MVP of the 2000 Alamo Bowl after rushing for an Alamo Bowl record 240 yards in a 66–17 win over Northwestern. He was one of eight semifinalists for the 2000 Doak Walker Award, which is given annually to the top college football running back. He was voted First-team All-Big 12 as a senior by the conference coaches and Second-team All-Big 12 by the Associated Press and Dallas Morning News. He was also named Academic All-Big 12 four times, First-team in 1997, Second-team in 1999 and 2000. He was also the school's first 1,000-yard rusher under Coach Frank Solich. He was also a two-time finalist for the Nebraska Lifter of the Year Award and was the first freshman to win the award in 1997. He was chosen as a team co-captain by his teammates in 2000.

== Professional career ==
=== Tennessee Titans ===
Alexander was selected in the sixth round (192nd overall) of the 2001 NFL draft by the Tennessee Titans. He played one season for the Titans before being released.

=== Jacksonville Jaguars ===
Alexander signed with the Jacksonville Jaguars where he spent 2002.

=== St. Louis Rams ===
Alexander signed with the St. Louis Rams and spent time with them in 2003.

=== Nashville Kats ===
After being released by the Rams, Alexander signed a three-year contract with the Nashville Kats of the Arena Football League on October 11, 2004. He made his AFL debut January 28, 2005 during a road game against the Columbus Destroyers, recording 25 rushing yards and a touchdown and a 24-yard touchdown reception. He was a fullback/linebacker during his time in the AFL as the league played under ironman rules.

Alexander was named to the AFL’s All-Rookie team after rushing for 105 yards and five touchdowns and recording 12.5 tackles in just seven games. After playing in each of the season’s first six games, he was inactive for nine of the final 10 games. He rushed for 35 yards and one touchdown and recorded a career-high 4.5 tackles on the road against the New York Dragons. In 2006, he was the Kats' leading rusher, for the second-consecutive season, recording 170 yards and eight touchdowns, while recording 13.5 tackles, in nine games. He recorded a season-high four tackles and a forced fumble in road game against the Las Vegas Gladiators. He recorded a season-high 36 yards and a touchdown against the Chicago Rush. in 2007, he was voted First-team All-Arena after leading the league with 426 yards rushing and setting a league record with 41 rushing touchdowns in 16 games. His 426 rushing yards are the second highest single season total in league history. He was named Offensive Player of the Game on June 10 after rushing for 51 yards and five touchdowns in Las Vegas. He was voted Offensive Player of the Game on May 19 after rushing for a career-high 71 yards and two touchdowns in a win in Chicago. He also earned Offensive Player of the Game and AFL Offensive Player of the Week honors for his game on April 21 against the Kansas City Brigade, rushing for 59 yards and a league record six touchdowns. He carried for 33 yards and five touchdowns and made three receptions for 38 yards in a win over the Utah Blaze.

=== Chicago Rush ===
On November 27, 2007, Alexander signed a two-year contract with the Chicago Rush. He began his first season with his hometown team ranked 11th in league history in rushing touchdowns with 54, and 16th in rushing yards with 694.

In 2008, Alexander carried the ball 70 times for 241 yards and 12 touchdowns. He also recorded 19 tackles, one pass break up, and one fumble recovery.

=== Alabama Vipers ===
Alexander was assigned to the Alabama Vipers of the Arena Football League on December 7, 2009.

In the 2010 season opener against the Bossier-Shreveport Battle Wings, Alexander rushed for 5 touchdowns on 10 carries, though the Vipers lost the game 48–54.

== Personal life ==
Alexander and his wife, Amy, live in Thompson's Station, Tennessee. They have three children Braxton, Kenyan & Ayla.
