= Stratford High School (Tennessee) =

Secondary school in Tennessee, United States

Coordinates: 36.19753°N 86.71869°W

Stratford STEM Magnet High School

Location
- 1800 Stratford Avenue; Nashville, (Davidson County), Tennessee 37216; United States

Information
- Type: Public high school
- Principal: Michael Pratt
- Staff: 56.54 (FTE)
- Enrollment: 787 (2022-23)
- Student to teacher ratio: 13.92
- Colors: Orange; Black; White
- Nickname: Spartans
- Website: https://stratfordhigh.mnps.org/

Stratford STEM Magnet High School (formerly Stratford Comprehensive High School) is a magnet school in Nashville, Tennessee, operated by Metropolitan Nashville Public Schools. It serves approximately 600 students. In March 2012, the Metro Board of Education dropped the "Comprehensive" title from all its zoned schools to reflect the district's new emphases on smaller learning communities and thematic career academies. The school is noteworthy as MNPS's only STEM high school. The school colors are White, Gray, Black, and Orange.

== Academies and Pathways ==
Stratford STEM Magnet High School has two academies, each with distinct pathways. Students are required to select a pathway by the 10th grade.

Academy of Science and Engineering (A.S.E.)

- Interdisciplinary Science Pathway
- Engineering Pathway
- Biotechnology Pathway

Academy of National Security and the Science of Teaching (N.S.S.T.)

- National Security Technology Pathway (Criminal Justice/Forensic Science)
- The Science of Teaching Pathway

(Changed in the 2020–21 school year, The NSST Academy was formally the Academy of National Security and Safety Technologies which included Criminal Justice/Forensic Science and Computer Simulation/Game Programming Pathways. The Computer Simulation/Game Programming Pathways were cut due to funding issues)

== Advanced Academics ==
Stratford STEM is designated as an International Cambridge School. In addition, Stratford STEM offers numerous Advanced Placement (AP) courses and dual credit options.

== Notable Staff ==
- Dr. Michael Pratt – Executive Principal

== Notable alumni ==
- Cory Fleming, former NFL player
- Keel Hunt, journalist and author
- Ken Johnson, former NFL player
