= Cory Fleming =

American football player (born 1971)

No. 82, 12
- Position: Wide receiver

Personal information
- Born: March 19, 1971 (age 55); Nashville, Tennessee, U.S.
- Listed height: 6 ft 1 in (1.85 m)
- Listed weight: 216 lb (98 kg)

Career information
- High school: Nashville (TN) Stratford
- College: Tennessee
- NFL draft: 1994: 3rd round, 87th overall pick

Career history
- San Francisco 49ers (1994)*; Dallas Cowboys (1994–1995); Nashville Kats (1997–2001); Carolina Cobras (2002); Orlando Predators (2003–2005); Nashville Kats (2006)
- * Offseason or practice squad member only

Awards and highlights
- Super Bowl champion (XXX); AFL Ironman of the Year (2004); AFL Rookie of the Year (1997); 4× All-Arena (1997, 1998, 2004, 2005); Second-team All-Arena (2002); 3× All-Ironman (1999, 2002, 2004); AFL's 20 Greatest Players #14 (2006); Arena Football Hall of Fame (2013); First-team All-SEC (1993)

Career NFL statistics
- Receptions: 6
- Receiving yards: 83
- Stats at Pro Football Reference

Career AFL statistics
- Receptions: 846
- Receiving yards: 10,221
- Touchdowns: 239
- Tackles: 145
- Interceptions: 20
- Stats at ArenaFan.com

Cory Lamont Fleming (born March 19, 1971) is an American former professional football player who was a wide receiver in the National Football League (NFL) for the Dallas Cowboys. He also was a member of the Nashville Kats, Carolina Cobras and Orlando Predators in the Arena Football League (AFL). He played college football for the University of Tennessee.

== Early life ==
Fleming attended Stratford High School, where he was the starting quarterback. As a senior, he passed for 860 yards and 6 touchdowns, while rushing for 400 yards and 11 touchdowns. He received All-state honors at the end of the season.

He was the starting power forward in basketball, earning honorable-mention All-state honors as a junior, when he led the state in rebounding with better than 15 boards per contest. He also practiced the high jump (6–10 1/2) in track.

== College career ==
Fleming accepted a football scholarship from the University of Tennessee and was converted to wide receiver. As a sophomore, he scored five touchdowns out of just 14 receptions, contributing to the team winning the SEC championship. After being the backup to Carl Pickens, he became a starter as a junior, registering 40 receptions for 490 yards (leading the team) and two touchdowns. In his last year, he posted 39 receptions for 596 yards and 11 touchdowns.

Fleming finished his college career with 94 receptions for 1,266 yards, and at the time school records, with 18 touchdown receptions, 11 single-season touchdown receptions, and six consecutive games with a touchdown reception.

== Professional career ==
=== San Francisco 49ers ===
Fleming was selected by the San Francisco 49ers in the third round (87th overall) of the 1994 NFL draft. On July 21, the team rescinded his rights because of salary cap reasons, making him a free agent without ever signing a contract or attending a practice.

=== Dallas Cowboys ===
On August 3, 1994, he was signed by the Dallas Cowboys. He was declared inactive in 11 games.

The next year, he competed to replace Alvin Harper in the starting lineup, but lost out to Kevin Williams and was named the team's third wide receiver, making him a part of the Super Bowl XXX winning team.

On February 6, 1996, he was suspended for a year by the NFL after failing a third drug test and was also waived by the Cowboys.

=== Arena Football League ===
In 1997, he was signed by the Nashville Kats of the Arena Football League, after being contacted by then offensive coordinator Jay Gruden. In 10 seasons, he was a five-time All-Arena, a four-time All–Ironman and an Ironman of the Year selection.

In 2013, Fleming was inducted into the Arena Football Hall of Fame.

== Personal life ==
Fleming owns an insurance agency and also organizes football camps for kids in the offseason. In August 2013, he was arrested in Davidson County, Tennessee, for driving under the influence of alcohol.
