= List of people from Adrian, Michigan =

The following list includes notable people who were born or have lived in Adrian, Michigan.

== Academics and engineering ==
- William James Beal, botanist; co-founder of Collegeville (later known as East Lansing); born in Adrian
- Norman Bel Geddes, theatrical and industrial designer (1939 New York World's Fair pavilion "Futurama"); born in Adrian
- Myrtle Craig Mowbray, educator and first African American woman to graduate from the Michigan Agricultural College in 1907; born in Adrian
- Garry Wills, prolific Pulitzer Prize-winning author, journalist, and historian, grew up in Adrian

== Business ==
- Orville D. Merillat, founder of Merillat Kitchens, later Merillat Industries; moved to Adrian as a young man

== Media and music ==
- Kirk Baily (1963–2022), actor
- Priscilla Bonner (1899–1996), silent screen movie star; grew up in Adrian
- Byron Darnton, war correspondent for the New York Times during World War II; born in Adrian
- Allen Lee Haff, television personality (Auction Hunters); born in Adrian
- Margaret Wynne Lawless (1847–1926) poet, author, educator, philanthropist
- Matt Noveskey, bass player for Blue October; born in Adrian
- James Royce Shannon (1881–1946), composer and lyricist; born in Adrian

== Politics and law ==
- Fernando C. Beaman, former U.S. congressman; lived in Adrian and was mayor in 1856
- Jerome B. Chaffee, U.S. senator from Colorado; lived in Adrian where he was a teacher and local businessman
- Thomas M. Cooley, 25th chief justice of the Michigan Supreme Court; lived in Adrian
- Charles Croswell, 17th governor of Michigan; lived in Adrian
- William L. Greenly, fifth governor of Michigan; lived in Adrian
- Chris Gregoire, 22nd governor of Washington; born in Adrian
- Haviland H. Lund, inspector of home settlement projects for the United States Department of the Interior; born in Adrian
- Martha Seger, former member of the Federal Reserve Board; born in Adrian

== Crime ==
- Sile Doty, infamous criminal gang leader; lived in Adrian

== Sports ==
=== Baseball ===
- Rube Kisinger (1876–1941), pitcher for the Detroit Tigers; born in Adrian
- Mike Marshall (1943-2021), pitcher with 9 different Major League Baseball teams; 2× All-Star (1974, 1975); recipient of the Cy Young Award (1974); born in Adrian
- Frank Navin (1871–1935), principal owner of the Detroit Tigers (1909–1935); vice president and acting president of the American League; born in Adrian

=== Billiards ===
- Lonnie Fox‑Raymond

=== Bowling ===
- Jordan Richard-Snodgrass, professional tenpin bowler on the PWBA Tour and 2023 PWBA Player of the Year. Born in Tecumseh, now resides in Adrian.

=== Coaching ===
- William Reid, basketball player, led Adrian High School to 1912 state title, coach at Colgate University, NCAA administrator and member of Basketball Hall of Fame
- Dale R. Sprankle, championship coach at Adrian College

=== Football ===
- Marcus Benard, linebacker for Arizona Cardinals; born in Adrian
- Kellen Davis, tight end for New York Jets, formerly for Detroit Lions, Seattle Seahawks, Chicago Bears and Cleveland Browns; born in Adrian
- Dorne Dibble, wide receiver for the Detroit Lions; 2x NFL Champion (1953, 1957); born in Adrian
- John Maulbetsch, All-American football halfback; played for Adrian College in 1911
- Bob Westfall (1919–1980), All-American football fullback; played for Michigan 1939–1941; played for Detroit Lions 1945 All-pro; inducted into the College Football Hall of Fame in 1987; lived in Adrian

== Military ==
- John Hack, awarded the Medal of Honor; grew up in Adrian and joined the Union Army there
