= Travis Reece =

American football player (born 1975)

No. 36, 35
- Position: Running back

Personal information
- Born: April 3, 1975 (age 51); Detroit, Michigan, U.S.
- Listed height: 6 ft 3 in (1.91 m)
- Listed weight: 252 lb (114 kg)

Career information
- High school: Denby (Detroit)
- College: Michigan State
- NFL draft: 1998: undrafted

Career history
- Detroit Lions (1998–1999); Nashville Kats (2001); Georgia Force (2002–2003); Grand Rapids Rampage (2005)

Career AFL statistics
- Rushing yards: 548
- Receptions: 28
- Receiving yards: 233
- Total touchdowns: 37
- Stats at ArenaFan.com
- Stats at Pro Football Reference

Travis C. Reece (born April 3, 1975) is an American former professional football player who was a running back for the Detroit Lions of the National Football League (NFL) from 1998 to 1999. He played college football for the Michigan State Spartans.

Senior fullback Travis Reece won the Danziger Award as the outstanding Detroit-area player on the '97 roster. Reece also received the Doug Weaver Oil Can Award as the team's top humorist.
