= Isaiah Ross (American football) =

American football player (born 1981)

No. 79
- Position: Guard

Personal information
- Born: November 6, 1981 (age 45); Elk Grove, California, U.S.
- Listed height: 6 ft 3 in (1.91 m)
- Listed weight: 320 lb (145 kg)

Career information
- College: Nevada
- NFL draft: 2004: undrafted

Career history
- San Diego Chargers (2004–2005)*; → Frankfurt Galaxy (2005); Nashville Kats (2007); New Orleans VooDoo (2008); New Orleans Saints (2008)*; Minnesota Vikings (2008)*; Washington Redskins (2008–2009)*; California Redwoods (2009)
- * Offseason or practice squad member only
- Stats at ArenaFan.com

Isaiah Ross (born November 6, 1981) is an American former football guard. He was signed by the San Diego Chargers as an undrafted free agent in 2004. He played college football at Nevada.

Ross was also a member of the Nashville Kats, New Orleans VooDoo, New Orleans Saints, Minnesota Vikings, Washington Redskins and California Redwoods.
