= Kenny Higgins =

American gridiron football player (born 1982)

No. 1
- Position: Wide receiver/Defensive back

Personal information
- Born: September 21, 1982 (age 44); Long Beach, California, U.S.
- Listed height: 6 ft 1 in (1.85 m)
- Listed weight: 186 lb (84 kg)

Career information
- College: Toledo
- NFL draft: 2005: undrafted

Career history
- San Diego Chargers (2005)*; Memphis Xplorers (2006); Nashville Kats (2007); Grand Rapids Rampage (2008); Toronto Argonauts (2009)*; Chicago Rush (2010)
- * Offseason or practice squad member only

Awards and highlights
- Second-team All-Arena (2008); All Rookie Team (2007)
- Stats at CFL.ca (archive)

Kenny Higgins (born September 21, 1982) is an American former football wide receiver. He was originally signed by the San Diego Chargers as an undrafted free agent in 2005. He played college football at Toledo.

Higgins also played for the Memphis Xplorers, Nashville Kats, Grand Rapids Rampage, and Toronto Argonauts.
