= Tyronne Jones =

American football player (born 1971)

No. 6, 1
- Position: Wide receiver

Personal information
- Born: September 12, 1971 (age 55); New Orleans, Louisiana, U.S.
- Listed height: 5 ft 9 in (1.75 m)
- Listed weight: 170 lb (77 kg)

Career information
- College: Grambling State

Career history
- Nashville Kats (1998–2001); Georgia Force (2002–2003); Philadelphia Soul (2004–2005); New Orleans VooDoo (2007–2008)

Awards and highlights
- AFL All-Rookie Team (1998)
- Stats at ArenaFan.com

Tyronne Jones (born September 12, 1971) is an American former professional football wide receiver in the Arena Football League. He played for the Nashville Kats, Philadelphia Soul, Georgia Force, and New Orleans VooDoo.

== College years ==
Jones attended Grambling State University and was a student and a letterman in football. In football, as a senior, he was named the Southwestern Conference Player of the Year.

== Arena Football League career ==
- 1998 – Jones played for the Nashville Kats and had an impressive rookie season, as he hauled in 94 receptions for 1054 yards(11.21 yards per reception avg.) and 21 touchdowns, and made 71 kickoff returns for 1,467 yards(20.66 yards per kickoff return avg.) and five touchdowns. After the season, he was named the Nashville Kats 1998 Team MVP and was named to the AFL All-Rookie team.
- 2001 – Jones played for the Nashville Kats and finished the season with 55 receptions for 794 yards(14.43 yards per reception avg.) and 21 touchdowns.
- 2004 – Jones played for the Philadelphia Soul in their inaugural season and finished the season with 76 receptions for 1,000 yards(13.16 yards per reception avg.) and 18 touchdowns, and made 46 kickoff returns for 1032 yards(22.43 yards per kickoff return avg.) and four touchdowns.
- 2005 – Jones played for the Philadelphia Soul and during the season, he appeared in 11 games and grabbed 28 receptions for 416 yards(14.86 yards per reception avg.) and seven touchdowns.
