= Carlos Yancy =

American football player (born 1970)

No. 40
- Position: Defensive back

Personal information
- Born: June 24, 1970 (age 56); Sarasota, Florida, U.S.
- Listed height: 6 ft 0 in (1.83 m)
- Listed weight: 185 lb (84 kg)

Career information
- High school: Laurinburg Institute (NC), Sarasota (FL)
- College: Georgia
- NFL draft: 1995: 7th round, 234th overall pick

Career history
- New England Patriots (1995); Green Bay Packers (1996)*
- * Offseason or practice squad member only
- Stats at Pro Football Reference

Carlos Delanio Yancy (born June 24, 1970) is an American former professional football defensive back. He played for the New England Patriots in 1995.

Yancy is from Sarasota and attended Riverview High School.
