= James Lynch (fullback) =

American football player (born 1982)

No. 35, 42
- Position: Fullback

Personal information
- Born: June 17, 1982 (age 44); Washington, D.C., U.S.
- Listed height: 5 ft 11 in (1.80 m)
- Listed weight: 276 lb (125 kg)

Career information
- High school: Dunbar (Washington, D.C.)
- College: Maryland (2000–2002)
- NFL draft: 2003: undrafted

Career history
- Minnesota Vikings (2003)*; Cincinnati Bengals (2003–2004); Miami Dolphins (2004); New Orleans VooDoo (2007–2008); Orlando Predators (2010–2011)
- * Offseason or practice squad member only

Awards and highlights
- AFL All-Rookie Team (2007)

Career NFL statistics
- Games played: 1
- Stats at Pro Football Reference
- Stats at ArenaFan.com

James Jerome Lynch (born June 17, 1982) is an American former professional football fullback who played for the Cincinnati Bengals of the National Football League (NFL). He played college football for the Maryland Terrapins. He was also on the Miami Dolphins' active roster but did not play in a game.

== Early life ==
Lynch was born on June 17, 1982, in Washington, D.C. He attended Dunbar High School in Washington, D.C. As a senior, Lynch rushed for 1,435 yards, scored 21 touchdowns, had 98 tackles, two interceptions and four forced fumbles.

== College career ==
Lynch played college football for the Maryland Terrapins from 2000 to 2002 and was a three-year letterman. He had 254 rushing yards for three touchdowns and had 16 receptions for 112 yards and one touchdown. In 2003, Lynch entered the NFL draft, forgoing his final year of eligibility to help support his family.

== Professional career ==
=== Minnesota Vikings ===
After going undrafted in the 2003 NFL draft, Lynch signed with the Minnesota Vikings as an undrafted free agent. On September 9, 2003, he was waived by the team.

=== Cincinnati Bengals ===
On September 30, 2003, Lynch was signed to the practice squad of the Cincinnati Bengals. On December 29, he was re-signed by the team. Lynch played in one game against the Miami Dolphins before he reverted to the practice squad on September 23, 2004.

=== Miami Dolphins ===
On December 18, 2004, Lynch was signed by the Miami Dolphins off the Bengals' practice squad. On April 5, 2005, he was waived by the team.

=== New Orleans VooDoo ===
On December 28, 2006, Lynch was signed by the New Orleans VooDoo of the Arena Football League (AFL). He played for two years, recording 172 rushing yards, 13 touchdowns, 24 receptions for 257 yards and five touchdowns with 11 tackles on defense. Lynch was named to the AFL All-Rookie Team in 2007.

=== Orlando Predators ===
Ahead of the 2010 AFL season, Lynch was signed by the Orlando Predators. Across two seasons, he had 146 rushing yards, ten touchdowns and seven catches for 35 yards with six tackles and one fumble recovery.

== Personal life ==
On December 2, 2003, Lynch was arrested in Covington, Kentucky, after he was charged with driving with a suspended license, resisting arrest, public intoxication, disorderly conduct and fleeing police. He posted a $503 bond and was released from jail.
