= Joe Minucci =

American football player (born 1981)

No. 71
- Position: Defensive lineman

Personal information
- Born: November 6, 1981 (age 45)
- Listed height: 6 ft 3 in (1.91 m)
- Listed weight: 295 lb (134 kg)

Career information
- College: Delaware
- NFL draft: 2003: undrafted

Career history
- New York Jets (2003)*; Tennessee Valley Vipers (2004); Nashville Kats (2005–2007); Tennessee Titans (2005)*; New Orleans Saints (2006)*; Baltimore Ravens (2006); Cleveland Gladiators (2008)
- * Offseason or practice squad member only

Awards and highlights
- Second-team All-Arena (2006); AFL All-Rookie Team (2005)

Career AFL statistics
- Tackles: 79
- Sacks: 19
- Forced fumbles: 9
- Fumble recoveries: 3
- Pass breakups: 11
- Stats at ArenaFan.com

Joe Minucci (born November 6, 1981) is an American former professional football defensive lineman who played four seasons in the Arena Football League (AFL) with the Nashville Kats and Cleveland Gladiators. He played college football at University of Delaware. He was also a member of the New York Jets, Tennessee Valley Vipers, Tennessee Titans, New Orleans Saints and Baltimore Ravens.

== College career ==
Minucci played for the Delaware Fightin' Blue Hens from 1999 to 2002, earning All-Atlantic 10 Conference honors his senior season in 2002 and helping the Hens advance to the 2000 NCAA Division I-AA championship playoff semifinals.

== Professional career ==
Minucci signed with the New York Jets on June 25, 2003, after going undrafted in the 2003 NFL draft. He was released by the Jets on July 15, 2003.

Minucci played for the Tennessee Valley Vipers of the af2 in 2004.

Minucci was signed by the Nashville Kats of the Arena Football League (AFL) on October 14, 2004. He played for the Kats from 2005 to 2007, earning Second Team All-Arena honors in 2006 and All-Rookie Team recognition in 2005.

Minucci signed with the Tennessee Titans on July 19, 2005. He was released by the Titans on August 29, 2005.

Minucci was signed by the New Orleans Saints on August 3, 2006. He was released by the Saints on September 2, 2006.

Minucci was signed to the Baltimore Ravens' practice squad on January 7, 2007.

Minucci was selected by the Cleveland Gladiators with the first overall pick in the AFL Dispersal Draft on October 26, 2007. He played for the Gladiators during the 2008 season.
