= Wendall Williams =

American football player (born 1990)

No. 82
- Position: Wide receiver

Personal information
- Born: September 18, 1990 (age 36); Syracuse, New York, U.S.
- Listed height: 5 ft 10 in (1.78 m)
- Listed weight: 185 lb (84 kg)

Career information
- High school: Bishop Ludden (Syracuse)
- College: Cumberlands
- NFL draft: 2016: undrafted

Career history
- Houston Texans (2016)*; New York Jets (2016)*; Houston Texans (2016)
- * Offseason or practice squad member only

Career NFL statistics
- Receptions: 4
- Receiving yards: 75
- Receiving touchdowns: 0
- Stats at Pro Football Reference

Wendall Williams
Personal information
- Nationality: United States
- Height: 5 ft 10 in (1.78 m)
- Weight: 186 lb (84 kg)

Sport
- Sport: Track & Field
- Event: Sprint
- College team: Cumberlands Patriots

Achievements and titles
- Personal bests: 100 m: 10.35 s; 200 m: 21.08 s; Long jump: 7.69m (25-2)

Wendall Williams (born September 18, 1990) is an American former professional football player who was a wide receiver for the Houston Texans of the National Football League (NFL). He played college football for the Cumberlands Patriots and was signed by the Texans as an undrafted free agent in 2016. He made many media headlines after he broke the 40-yard dash record, with a time of 4.19 seconds unofficially.

== Early life ==
Williams was born to Claudine Clarke, in Syracuse, New York. He attended Bishop Ludden High School, where he played competitive football and track. In his junior season, he totaled 17 receiving touchdowns, and tallied 28 more as a senior. However, Williams struggled academically, which deterred many colleges from recruiting him. Therefore, he committed to play football at Morrisville State College.

== College career ==
Williams signed with Division III Morrisville State College, where he played football for the Mustangs. After his freshman season, he totaled 30 receptions for 515 yards and 3 touchdowns. However, he left Morrisville State the following year, due to his clashes with the coach. He subsequently enrolled at Onondaga Community College, where he attended for two semesters. He then transferred to Hudson Valley Community College, later dropping out after losing his financial aid package for dropping too many classes. He then worked as a truck driver, and did not continue his athletic career. When Williams was 21, he received a call from family friend Will Dowdell, encouraging Williams to continue his athletic career in college. Motivated, Williams enrolled at Herkimer County Community College, playing basketball and track for the Generals. While at Herkimer, he was a captain of the basketball team, shooting 71 percent from the field, while pursuing an associate degree in business sports management. He accepted an offer to University of the Cumberlands, where he enrolled with two remaining years of athletic eligibility. Williams started at wide receiver during his junior and senior seasons, and competed on the track team, participating in the 100 and 200 meter dash, as well as the long jump. As the University of the Cumberlands' primary receiver in his final season, Williams accounted for 48.3% of the team's receiving yards and touchdowns on 30.5 yards per reception.

== Professional career ==
=== Houston Texans ===
Williams was signed by the Texans as an undrafted free agent on May 6, 2016. He was released by the Texans on September 3, 2016, during final roster cuts.

=== New York Jets ===
Williams was signed to the Jets' practice squad on September 12, 2016. He was released on September 28, 2016.

=== Houston Texans (second stint) ===
Williams was signed to the Texans' practice squad on November 9, 2016. He was promoted to the active roster on December 13, 2016. During his second stint, he played in 2 games recording 4 catches for 75 yards.

On September 2, 2017, Williams was waived by the Texans after breaking his collarbone in a preseason game.
