= Scott Mitchell (wide receiver) =

American gridiron football player (born 1983)

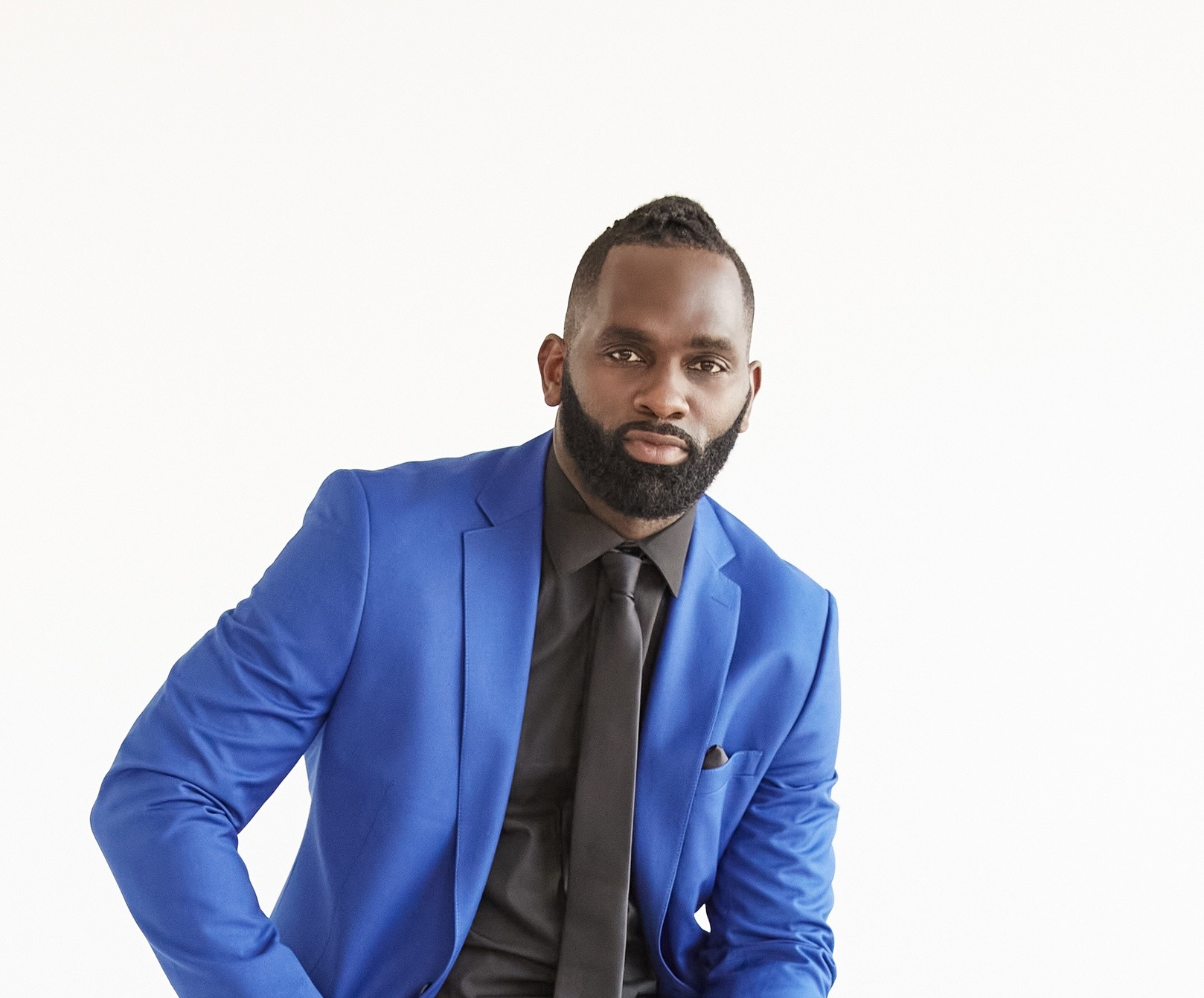

Profile
- Position: Wide receiver

Personal information
- Born: August 4, 1983 (age 43); Harbor City, California, U.S.
- Listed height: 6 ft 3 in (1.91 m)
- Listed weight: 210 lb (95 kg)

Career information
- College: Kentucky
- NFL draft: 2006: undrafted

Career history
- New Orleans VooDoo (2007); Hamilton Tiger-Cats (2008–2009); Winnipeg Blue Bombers (2009)

Scott Anthony Mitchell (born August 4, 1983), also known as Scotty Franchyze, is an American former professional football player who was a wide receiver in the Arena Football League (AFL) and Canadian Football League (CFL). During his time in college, Mitchell finished his career by transferring to and playing for the Kentucky Wildcats.

In 2025, Mitchell gained global public attention when he and his partner, fashion designer Davanh DiMarco, helped detain a suspected arsonist at Runyon Canyon Park in Los Angeles.

== Early life ==
Mitchell played wide receiver at Clear Creek High School in League City, Texas, garnering unanimous All-District honors at the wide receiver position in the 2000 season before graduating from high school in 2001.

== College career ==
=== Mount San Antonio College ===
After sitting out a season at the University of New Mexico in 2001–02, Mitchell transferred to Mount San Antonio College in Walnut, California in 2002. Mitchell was a two-year starter at Mount SAC, compiling 1,288 receiving yards, 64 receptions and 11 touchdowns in 14 games.

Upon leaving the junior college and with choices that also included Arizona State, Oregon State and Texas A&M, he decided to finish his collegiate career at the University of Kentucky.

=== Kentucky ===
Mitchell finished his career at Kentucky with 53 catches, 671 total yards receiving and 3 touchdown receptions in 20 games in the 2004 and 2005 seasons.

== Professional career ==
=== Berlin Thunder ===
Undrafted in the 2006 NFL draft, Mitchell began his professional career when he was drafted by the Berlin Thunder of NFL Europa before the start of that league's final season. However, he did not make the final roster cut and never recorded a statistic for the team.

=== New Orleans VooDoo ===
Mitchell landed in the AFL, where he played for the New Orleans VooDoo in 2007. During his only season with the VooDoo, Mitchell compiled 17 catches, 184 total yards receiving and 1 touchdown reception.

=== Hamilton Tiger-Cats ===
Mitchell then signed with the CFL's Hamilton Tiger-Cats in 2008, where he compiled 35 catches, 682 yards receiving and 2 touchdown receptions in 16 games. He was released from the Tiger-Cats just before the start of the next season and was briefly signed by the Winnipeg Blue Bombers later that year but never played for the franchise.

== Personal ==
Mitchell is not currently with any team and resides in San Diego, California. On July 13, 2025, Mitchell and his partner, Davanh DiMarco, confronted and helped detain a suspected arsonist who had ignited brush along a trail at Runyon Canyon Park in Los Angeles. The incident was widely reported by major national media including CNN, NBC News, ABC7, CBS, and the Los Angeles Times.
