= Pat Sperduto =

American football coach and executive (born 1966)

No. 65 – Kansas City Chiefs
- Title: Director of college scouting

Personal information
- Born: October 14, 1966 (age 60); Somerville, Massachusetts, U.S.
- Listed height: 6 ft 2 in (1.88 m)
- Listed weight: 265 lb (120 kg)

Career information
- Position: Offensive lineman / defensive lineman (No. 65)
- College: UMass Boston
- NFL draft: 1990: undrafted

Career history

Playing
- BC Lions (1990); Tampa Bay Storm (1991–1993)

Coaching
- Murray State (1991) (Assistant coach); Tampa Bay Storm (1994–1995) (Assistant coach); Connecticut Coyotes (1996) (Defensive coordinator); Nashville Kats (1997) (Defensive coordinator); Tennessee Titans (1998-2007) (Assistant offensive line coach); Nashville Kats (1998) (Assistant head coach/Defensive coordinator); Nashville Kats (1999–2001) (Head coach); Nashville Kats (2005–2007) (Head coach); Columbus Destroyers (2009)* (Head coach)

Operations
- Tennessee Titans (2002–2004) (Scout); Kansas City Chiefs (2009–2023) (Area scout); Kansas City Chiefs (2024–present) (Director of college scouting)

Awards and highlights
- 3× Super Bowl champion (LIV, LVII, LVIII); 3× ArenaBowl champion (1991, 1993, 1995); 3× All-NEC (1987–1989)

Head coaching record
- Regular season: 48–41–1
- Postseason: 5–4
- Career: 53–45–1
- Stats at ArenaFan.com

Pasquale Sperduto (born October 14, 1966) is an American football coach and executive. He is currently the director of college scouting for the Kansas City Chiefs of the National Football League (NFL). Sperduto played his entire three-year Arena career as an active player with Tampa Bay Storm, and was also the final head coach of the Nashville Kats.

== College career ==
Sperduto attended the UMass Boston. While there, he was both a fullback and linebacker. He earned All-New England Conference honors from 1987 to 1989.

== Professional playing career ==
Sperduto was an Offensive lineman / Defensive lineman for the Tampa Bay Storm from 1991 until 1993. While playing for Tampa Bay, he won two ArenaBowls. For his career, he recorded 24 tackles, three sacks, two forced fumbles and two fumble recoveries.

== Professional coaching career ==
=== Early career ===
While playing for the Storm, Sperduto also served as a coach at Murray State University, along with National Football League General Manager Scott Pioli. Then, in 1992, Sperduto took over football operations for the American Sports Foundation of Macelatta in Tolentino, Italy.

=== Arena Football League (1995–2001) ===
Sperduto joined the Storm as an assistant coach in 1994 and helped them win ArenaBowl IX. The next season, he served as defensive coordinator for the Connecticut Coyotes. He then joined the Nashville Kats where, in 1997, he served as defensive coordinator and the Director of Player Personnel. and was promoted to Assistant Head coach/Defensive coordinator in 1998.

At the end of that season, Spurduto was named head coach of the Kats and coached them to an 8–6 record in 1999. Then in 2000 the team finished 9-5 and earned a spot in ArenaBowl XIV. In 2001, the Kats finished 10–4, won the National Conference Southern Division, and punched their ticket to ArenaBowl XV, losing for a second time in a row in the AFL World Championship Game.

After the season, the franchise was sold to Virgil Williams, an Atlanta businessman, who purchased the franchise for nearly $10 million in December 2001, where he moved them to Georgia, to become the Georgia Force.

=== National Football League ===
Sperduto was hired by the Tennessee Titans in September 2001, and served on the coaching and scouting staffs until June 2008. While working for the Titans, in 2004, he was charged to oversee the startup process of a new AFL franchise to be placed in Nashville.

=== Arena Football League (2005–2008) ===
In 2005, Sperduto returned to coaching in the Arena Football League as Head coach and Director of football operations for the "new" Nashville Kats franchise. That season, the Kats went 6-9-1 and finished third in the Central Division. The next season the team went 8-8 en route to a second-place finish in the division and spot in the playoffs. The 2007 season saw Nashville go 7-9 and miss the playoffs by one game. After the season, the team folded, once again.

On June 15, 2008, he was hired as the fourth head coach of the Columbus Destroyers. However, the 2009 AFL season was cancelled due to economic concerns regarding the league.

=== National Football League (2009–present) ===
On May 1, 2009, Sperduto was hired by his friend, Pioli, as an area scout for the Kansas City Chiefs. In 2024, he was promoted to co-director of college scouting.
