= Rupert Grant =

American football player (born 1973)

- Born: November 5, 1973 (age 53); Washington, D.C., U.S.
- Education: Howard University
- Football career

Profile
- Position: Fullback / Linebacker

Career information
- College: Howard Bisons

Career history
- New England Patriots (1995–1996); Nashville Kats (1999–2001); Detroit Fury (2003); Orlando Predators (2004–2005); Nashville Kats (2005–2007)
- Stats at Pro Football Reference
- Stats at ArenaFan.com

Rupert Grant (born November 5, 1973) is an American former professional Arena Football League (AFL) fullback/linebacker. His nickname is "Dogghead". During his time in the AFL, Grant played for the Nashville Kats, Detroit Fury and Orlando Predators. He was originally signed by the New England Patriots of the National Football League (NFL) as an undrafted free agent out of Howard University in 1995. He was named Second-team All-Arena in 2001 and 2004.
