= Tony Locke (American football) =

American football player (born 1978)

No. 6, 2
- Position: Wide receiver

Personal information
- Born: May 19, 1978 (age 48); Springfield, Ohio, U.S.
- Listed height: 5 ft 10 in (1.78 m)
- Listed weight: 195 lb (88 kg)

Career information
- College: Ohio State

Career history
- Columbus Destroyers (2004); Los Angeles Avengers (2005–2006); Columbus Destroyers (2007); New Orleans VooDoo (2007)
- Stats at ArenaFan.com

Tony Locke (born May 19, 1978) is an American former professional football wide receiver/defensive back who played in the Arena Football League. He played college football for the Ohio State Buckeyes where he was a two-year letterman.

== Early life ==
Locke attended Urbana High School in Urbana, Ohio, where he stood out in football, basketball, and athletics. In football, he was a two-time All-Area selection and also was named the Team MVP as a senior.

== Professional career ==
He started his professional career in the AFL2 with the Cincinnati Swarm, and also played for the Albany Conquest before going on to start his AFL career with the Columbus Destroyers.

Lock played in the AFL for the Destroyers (2004, 2007), the Los Angeles Avengers (2005–2006), and the New Orleans VooDoo (2007).

He retired from the AFL after the 2007 season.

== Film career ==
He recently appeared in the movie Invincible starring Mark Wahlberg as a football player along with WR/DB Kevin Ingram who played with Locke when he was with the Los Angeles Avengers.
