= Nashville Kats =

Arena football team

Logo

General information
- Founded: 1997 (original incarnation)
- Folded: 2007 (second incarnation)
- Headquartered: Gaylord Entertainment Center in Nashville, Tennessee
- Colors: Sky blue, navy, white, and red
- Mascot: Kool Kat

Personnel
- Owners: Mark Bloom (original incarnation); Bud Adams (second incarnation)
- Head coach: Pat Sperduto

Team history
- First franchise: Nashville Kats (1997–2001); Second franchise: Nashville Kats (2005–2007)

Home fields
- Gaylord Entertainment Center (1997–2001, 2005–2007)

League / conference affiliations
- Arena Football League (1997–2001; 2005–2007): American Conference (1997–2001, 2005–2007); East (1997); South (1998–2001); Central (2005–2007)

Championships
- Conference championships: 0 Prior to 2005, the AFL did not have conference championship games
- Division championships: 2: Central: 1997, 2001

Playoff appearances (6)
- 1997, 1998, 1999, 2000, 2001, 2006

The Nashville Kats were an Arena Football League team, located in Nashville, Tennessee. They were last coached by Pat Sperduto, who coached the team's original incarnation to two ArenaBowl appearances prior to the original franchise's move to Atlanta in 2002 (then becoming the Georgia Force). Sperduto also coached the second incarnation of the Nashville Kats following their return to the Arena Football League as an expansion team in 2005.

== History ==
=== Original Nashville Kats (1997–2001) ===
The team began as the Nashville Kats in 1997. The franchise was that of charter Arena team the Denver Dynamite, which had not played since 1991. The original Kats played in the then-named Nashville Arena (AKA "The Alley") in downtown Nashville. The team was named for the 1967 hit "Nashville Cats" by The Lovin' Spoonful. The team's logo featured an anthropomorphic tabby wearing a 1950s-style leather jacket, holding the neck of a guitar in one paw and juggling a football with the other.

The Kats were initially coached by Eddie Khayat in 1997 and 1998, with the assistance of future Washington Football Team coach Jay Gruden as offensive co-ordinator in his first-ever coaching position. Gruden then returned to active play with the Orlando Predators and assistant to his brother Jon, then head coach of the NFL Tampa Bay Buccaneers, which played in the AFL off-season. Khayat was succeeded as Kats' head coach by Pat Sperduto for the balance of the team's time in Nashville (including the second incarnation of the team). The Kats were the league's Organization of the Year for their inaugural year of 1997, and were in the playoffs for every season of their relatively brief existence. The team's success in the playoffs led to consecutive appearances in the ArenaBowl (XIV and XV) each of the original team's final two seasons, although they were unable to win the AFL's championship in either appearance.

After being unable to reach favorable agreements with arena management which was controlled by the venue's primary tenant, the Nashville Predators of the National Hockey League, majority owner Mark Bloom sold the franchise in December 2001 to Virgil Williams, an Atlanta businessman, for nearly $10 million. The team's departure from the Nashville market was not related to lack of success neither on the field, nor at the box office, where they were a superior draw to several ongoing Arena football teams, but rather their inability to negotiate a favorable lease with the Predators. Following the move to Atlanta, this team would be rechristened the Georgia Force.

=== The birth of the expansion Nashville Kats (2001–2005) ===
Shortly after the original team's departure from Nashville, Bud Adams, the owner of the Tennessee Titans of the National Football League, purchased the rights to an expansion franchise in Nashville (along with the Kats identity). Initially, Adams was unable to negotiate a lease with the Nashville Predators to return the team to then-Gaylord Entertainment Center (now called Bridgestone Arena and formerly Nashville Arena) on terms he deemed to be adequately favorable. Because Nashville Municipal Auditorium and Vanderbilt's Memorial Gym, the only other sizable indoor venues in Nashville, are unsuitable for arena football (Municipal Auditorium's floor was too small to contain the field of play as its ice hockey rink had always been of less-than-regulation size and Vanderbilt had a "dry" no-alcohol policy for on-campus athletic events), Adams explored the idea of building his own mid-size arena (roughly 10,000 seats) to host the Kats and compete with the Gaylord Entertainment Center for concerts and smaller sporting events. Ultimately, the Predators agreed to a deal with Adams during the summer of 2004. Following the new agreement, Adams announced that the expansion Kats would begin play for the 2005 season and would return to the arena the original team called home.

While the majority of the new team was owned by Adams, country music singer Tim McGraw was brought in as a minority investor. McGraw, his wife Faith Hill, and their children were often seen on the first row of sideline seats along the south endzone. As a tie-in with McGraw, the PA system played his hit "I Like It, I Love It" following a Kats touchdown.

=== The new Kats take the field (2005–2007) ===
The second incarnation of the Nashville Kats began play in 2005 at the then-Gaylord Entertainment Center, the home of the original Kats team. When the Kats were revived, they reclaimed the history of the original Kats from the Georgia Force. This was an arrangement similar to the one made in the NFL with the Cleveland Browns and in the CFL with the Montreal Alouettes. The revived logo was almost identical to the original logo. The noteworthy exceptions were the ball (which was drawn as the lighter colored, brown-with-blue-stripe ball used in the AFL at that time) and the color scheme of the logo, which was slightly modified to mirror the team colors of the Tennessee Titans. New team uniforms also adopted the Tennessee Titans color scheme, going from the dark blue/silver/white combination of the original team to a new scheme including "Titans" light blue/red/white. The new team also introduced a new in-arena mascot named Kool Kat, a cat clad in a jersey and shorts that often performed daredevil stunts during breaks in the game. Sperduto also returned as head coach.

The new Kats' first season started horrendously. After an opening victory on the road, it took until week 8 for the franchise to record another victory. But after that, the Kats won their next five games, and finished the season with a 6–9–1 record. The 41–41 tie at the Dallas Desperados on April 8 was only the second in AFL history, and prompted the League to change its overtime rules to eliminate ties before the start of the 2006 season.

Nashville finished the 2006 regular season with an 8–8 record; good enough to earn the team a playoff berth. The Kats lost in the opening round to the Chicago Rush.

The Kats finished the 2007 season with a 7–9 record and just missed the playoffs after a Utah Blaze win in the final week of the season. On October 10, 2007, after months of speculation, owner Bud Adams decided to shut down operations. While ticket sales had been good initially, the team struggled at the box office following its poor performance in the 2005 season (the first season of the revived team).

The team was not mentioned as a possible addition to the resurrected AFL in 2010, though fans have been clamoring for a return of the Kats in some form to the renamed Bridgestone Arena in Nashville.

In 2014, a new indoor football team began play at the Nashville Municipal Auditorium as the Nashville Venom in the Professional Indoor Football League, bringing the excitement of professional indoor football back to Music City. Although this team won the championship of its league in its initial season as a member, it vanished (along with the league as a whole) after the 2015 season. As of 2017 there have been no further attempts to resurrect indoor football in the Nashville market.

=== Revival ===
An unrelated team bearing the same name began play in the 2024 Arena Football League and joined Arena Football One in 2025.

== Head coaches ==
Name	Term	Regular season				Playoffs		Awards
Name	Term	W	L	T	Win%	W	L	Awards
Eddie Khayat	1997–1998	19	9	0	.679	0	2	1997 AFL Coach of the Year
Pat Sperduto	1999–2001, 2005-2007	48	41	1	.539	5	4	

== Notable players ==
=== Arena Football Hall of Famers ===
Nashville Kats Hall of Famers
No.	Name	Year inducted	Position(s)	Years w/ Kats
24	Cory Fleming	2013	WR/LB	1997–2001, 2006
7	Darryl Hammond	2013	WR/DB	1997–2001, 2005–2006
10	Joe March	2000	OL/DL	1997

=== Individual awards ===
Rookie of the Year
Season	Player	Position(s)
1997	Cory Fleming	WR/LB

Lineman of the Year
Season	Player	Position(s)
1998	James Baron	OL/DL
2001	James Baron	OL/DL

Defensive Player of the Year
Season	Player	Position(s)
1999	James Baron	OL/DL

=== All-Arena players ===
The following Kats players were named to All-Arena Teams:

- FB Dan Alexander (1)
- FB/LB Rupert Grant (1)
- WR/DB Darryl Hammond (1), Jarrick Hillery (1)
- WR/LB Cory Fleming (2)
- OL/DL James Baron (5), Joe Minucci (1)
- DB Ahmad Hawkins (1)
- DS Jamie Coleman (1), Corey Johnson (1), Kahlil Carter (1)

=== All-Ironman players ===
The following Force players were named to All-Ironman Teams:

- WR/DB Jarrick Hillery (1)
- WR/LB Cory Fleming (1), Darryl Hammond (2)
- OL/DL James Barron (2)

=== All-Rookie players ===
The following Kats players were named to All-Rookie Teams:

- FB/LB Travis Reece, Dan Alexander, Frank Carter
- WR/DB Tyronne Jones, Corey Johnson, Jarrick Hillery
- WR Kenny Higgins
- OL/DL Aaron Hamilton, Aaron McConnell, Joe Minucci

== Season-by-season ==
ArenaBowl champions	ArenaBowl appearance	Division champions	Playoff berth

Season	League	Conference	Division	Regular season				Postseason results
Season	League	Conference	Division	Finish	Wins	Losses	Ties	Postseason results
Nashville Kats
1997	AFL	National	Eastern	1st	10	4	0	Lost Quarterfinals (Tampa Bay) 52–49
1998	AFL	National	Southern	3rd	9	5	0	Lost Quarterfinals (Orlando) 58–43
1999	AFL	National	Southern	2nd	8	6	0	Lost Quarterfinals (Arizona) 34–30
2000	AFL	National	Southern	2nd	9	5	0	Won Wild Card Round (Grand Rapids) 57–14; Won Quarterfinals (Iowa) 63–56; Won Semifinals (San Jose) 51–42; Lost ArenaBowl XIV (Orlando) 41–38
2001	AFL	National	Southern	1st	10	4	0	Won Quarterfinals (Toronto) 45–38; Won Semifinals (San Jose) 71–47; Lost ArenaBowl XV (Grand Rapids) 64–42
2002	Dormant							
2003	Dormant							
2004	Dormant							
2005	AFL	American	Central	3rd	6	9	1	
2006	AFL	American	Central	2nd	8	8	0	Lost Wild Card Round (Chicago) 55–47
2007	AFL	American	Central	4th	7	9	0	
Total					67	50	1	(includes only regular season)
Total					5	6	0	(includes only the postseason)
Total					72	56	1	(includes both regular season and postseason)
