= 2007 Kansas City Brigade season =

Arena Football League team season

- Head coach: Kevin Porter
- Home stadium: Kemper Arena

Results
- Record: 10–6
- Division place: 2nd
- Playoffs: L 49–42 vs. Colorado

The 2007 Kansas City Brigade season was the second season for the arena football franchise. They made the playoffs for the first time in franchise history, going 10–6 as compared to the 3–13 record in 2006. However, they lost in the first round of the playoffs to the Colorado Crush 49–42.

== Regular season schedule ==
Week	Date	Opponent	Home/Away	Result
1	March 4	Chicago Rush	Home	W 54–41
2	March 10	Colorado Crush	Away	L 44–40
3	March 16	Dallas Desperados	Home	L 66–54
4		Bye	Week	
5	March 30	Arizona Rattlers	Home	W 62–61
6	April 8	Las Vegas Gladiators	Away	W 65–31
7	April 14	Grand Rapids Rampage	Home	W 52–41
8	April 21	Nashville Kats	Away	L 49–40
9	April 27	Colorado Crush	Home	L 45–42
10	May 5	Philadelphia Soul	Away	W 53–41
11	May 12	Utah Blaze	Home	W 60–41
12	May 20	New York Dragons	Away	L 62–56
13	May 26	Los Angeles Avengers	Home	W 62–56
14	June 2	Grand Rapids Rampage	Away	W 66–53
15	June 8	Columbus Destroyers	Away	W 47–34
16	June 16	Nashville Kats	Home	W 66–63
17	June 23	Chicago Rush	Away	L 48–21

== Playoffs ==
Round	Date	Opponent	Home/Away	Result
1	June 30	(6) Colorado Crush	Home	L 49–42

== Coaching ==
Kevin Porter started his second season as head coach of the Brigade.

== Stats ==
=== Offense ===
==== Passing ====
Player	Comp.	Att.	Comp%	Yards	TD's	INT's	Long	Rating
Raymond Philyaw	371	538	69	4338	85	11	42	124.1
Jose Davis	5	12	41.7	59	1	0	24	78.1

==== Rushing ====
Player	Car.	Yards	Avg.	TD's	Long
Dawan Moss	51	192	3.8	8	44
Charles Frederick	50	133	2.7	14	27
Raymond Philyaw	34	40	1.2	4	10
Jerel Myers	5	20	4	1	9
Ira Gooch	5	6	1.2	0	6
Deveron Hooper	1	2	2	0	2
Boo Williams	2	1	.5	1	1
Denario Smalls	3	0	0	0	2
Byron Dozart	1	−2	−2	0	−2

==== Receiving ====
Player	Rec.	Yards	Avg.	TD's	Long
Charles Frederick	115	1385	12	27	42
Jerel Myers	104	1183	11.4	21	38
Anthony Hines	58	822	14.2	12	39
Boo Williams	45	474	10.5	17	35
Ira Gooch	24	339	14.1	6	32
Sam Simmons	15	197	13.1	2	30
Kevin Beard	10	87	8.7	0	21
Dawan Moss	7	39	5.6	1	12
Cyron Brown	3	17	5.7	1	8
Larrell Johnson	3	14	4.7	0	6
Jamarr Wood	1	13	13	0	13
Cecil Moore	2	9	4.5	2	8
Raymond Philyaw	1	−6	−6	0	−6

==== Touchdowns ====
Player	TD's	Rush	Rec	Ret	Pts
Charles Frederick	41	14	27	0	246
Jerel Myers	22	1	21	0	132
Boo Williams	18	1	17	0	108
Anthony Hines	12	0	12	0	72
Dawan Moss	9	8	1	0	54
Ira Gooch	6	0	6	0	36
Raymond Philyaw	4	4	0	0	26
Cecil Moore	2	0	2	0	12
Sam Simmons	2	0	2	0	12
Denario Smalls	1	0	0	1	12
Cyron Brown	1	0	1	0	6
Jamarr Woods	1	0	1	0	6

=== Defense ===
Player	Tackles	Solo	Assisted	Sack	Solo	Assisted	INT	Yards	TD's	Long
Denario Smalls	72	52	10	0	0	0	1	42	1	42
Kenny McEntyre	57.5	42	31	0	0	0	9	142	3	33
Deveron Harper	56	45	22	0	0	0	2	6	0	6
Isaiah Trufant	53	43	20	0	0	0	1	4	0	4
Travis Coleman	43	33	22	0	0	0	3	52	1	33
Byron Douzart	37	22	30	2.5	2	1	0	0	0	0
B.J. Cohen	28	20	16	6.5	6	1	0	0	0	0
Jerry Turner	21	11	20	3	2	2	0	0	0	0
Nick Ward	14	11	6	0	0	0	3	9	0	7
Arrion Dixon	10.5	4	13	2.5	2	1	0	0	0	0
Jerel Myers	10	9	2	0	0	0	0	0	0	0
Boo Williams	10	6	8	0	0	0	0	0	0	0
Charles Frederick	9.5	6	7	0	0	0	0	0	0	0
Gary Kral	9	8	2	0	0	0	0	0	0	0
Hugh Hunter	8.5	4	9	2	2	0	0	0	0	0
Cyron Brown	7	5	4	.5	0	1	0	0	0	0
Colin Bryant	6	3	6	0	0	0	0	0	0	0
Jamarr Woods	5.5	4	3	0	0	0	0	0	0	0
Dawan Moss	5	4	2	0	0	0	0	0	0	0
Neil Purvis	3.5	2	3	0	0	0	0	0	0	0
Ira Gooch	2.5	2	1	0	0	0	0	0	0	0
Anthony Hines	2	2	0	0	0	0	0	0	0	0
Cecil Moore	2	2	0	0	0	0	0	0	0	0
Chris Demaree	1.5	1	1	1	1	0	0	0	0	0
Larrell Johnson	1	1	0	0	0	0	0	0	0	0
Raymond Philyaw	1	1	0	0	0	0	0	0	0	0

=== Special teams ===
==== Kick return ====
Player	Kick Ret	Yards	TD's	Long	Avg	FG Ret	Yards	TD's	Long	Avg
Jerel Myers	46	855	0	55	18.6	2	37	0	25	18.5
Charles Frederick	32	602	0	45	18.8	1	9	0	9	9
Sam Simmons	5	108	0	28	21.6	0	0	0	0	0
Denario Smalls	6	47	1	27	7.8	2	15	0	13	7.5
Ira Gooch	1	6	0	6	6	0	0	0	0	0
Travis Coleman	1	3	0	3	3	0	0	0	0	0
Nick Ward	0	0	0	0	0	1	5	0	5	5

==== Kicking ====
Player	Extra pt.	Extra pt. Att.	FG	FGA	Long	Pct.	Pts
Gary Kral	95	120	5	13	49	0.385	110

== Playoff Stats ==
=== Offense ===
==== Passing ====
Player	Comp.	Att.	Comp%	Yards	TD's	INT's
Raymond Philyaw	36	52	69.2	321	4	1

==== Rushing ====
Player	Car.	Yards	Avg.	TD's
Dawan Moss	7	12	1.7	1
Charles Frederick	2	−6	−3	0
Raymond Philyaw	1	−9	−9	0

==== Receiving ====
Player	Rec.	Yards	Avg.	TD's
Anthony Hines	15	120	8	3
Charles Frederick	11	119	10.8	0
Jerel Myers	8	68	8.5	1
Dawan Moss	1	9	9	0
Jamarr Ward	1	5	5	0

=== Defense ===
Player	Tackles	Solo	Assisted	Sack	Solo	Assisted	INT	Yards	TD's
Isaiah Trufant	11	6	5	0	0	0	1	0	0
Travis Coleman	4	2	2	0	0	0	0	0	0
Hugh Hunter	2	2	0	0	0	0	0	0	0
Denario Smalls	4	1	3	0	0	0	0	0	0
Kenny McEntyre	1	0	0	0	0	0	1	38	1
Jerel Myers	1	0	0	0	0	0	0	0	0
B.J. Cohen	1	0	0	0	0	0	0	0	0
Gary Kral	1	0	0	0	0	0	0	0	0
Bryon Douzart	1	0	0	0	0	0	0	0	0
Anthony Hines	1	0	0	0	0	0	0	0	0
Jerry Turner	3	0	3	0	0	0	0	0	0

=== Special teams ===
==== Kick return ====
Player	Ret	Yards	Avg
Charles Frederick	3	69	23
Jerel Myers	3	49	16.3

==== Kicking ====
Player	Extra pt.	Extra pt. Att.	FG	FGA	Pts
Gary Kral	6	6	0	2	6

== Regular season ==
=== Week 1: vs Chicago Rush ===
	1	2	3	4	Total
CHI	13	6	7	15	41
KC	7	16	12	19	54

at Kemper Arena, Kansas City, Missouri

- Game time: March 4, 2007 at 11:30 AM CST
- Game attendance: 13,600
- Officials: Bill Lemonnier, Mike Delaney, Allen Baynes, Dana McKinzie, Billy Beckett
- Offensive Player of the Game: Charles Frederick (KC)
- Defensive Player of the Game: Kenny McEntyre (KC)

Scoring Summary:

1st Quarter:

- 11:42 CHI – 18 yd TD Pass to Sippio from D`Orazio (Failed PAT) – 6–0 CHI
- 07:21 KC – 1 yd TD Run by Philyaw (PAT by Rush) – 7–6 KC
- 02:07 CHI – 24 yd Interception Return TD by Alfonzo (PAT by Frantz) – 13–7 CHI

2nd Quarter:

- 12:11 KC – 5 yd TD Pass to Myers from Philyaw (PAT by Rush) – 14–13 KC
- 11:29 KC – Safety – 16–13 KC
- 06:41 KC – 11 yd TD Pass to Myers from Philyaw (PAT by Rush) – 23–13 KC
- 01:10 CHI – 2 yd TD Pass to Sippio from D`Orazio (Failed PAT by Frantz) – 23–19 KC

3rd Quarter:

- 13:03 KC – 9 yd TD Run by Frederick (Failed PAT by Rush) – 29–19 KC
- 08:42 CHI – 20 yd TD Pass to Sippio from D`Orazio (PAT by Frantz) – 29–26 KC
- 03:52 KC – 3 yd TD Run by Moss (Failed PAT by Rush) – 35–26 KC

4th Quarter:

- 14:11 KC – 5 yd TD Run by Frederick (Failed Rush Attempt by Bishop) – 41–26 KC
- 14:11 CHI – PAT Return by Robinson – 41–28 KC
- 09:01 CHI – 2 yd TD Pass to Sippio from D`Orazio (PAT by Frantz) – 41–35 KC
- 01:44 KC – 6 yd TD Run by Philyaw PAT by Rush) – 48–35 KC
- 00:30 KC – 27 yd TD Run by Frederick (Failed PAT by Rush) – 54–35 KC
- 00:00 CHI – 31 yd TD Pass to Sippio from D`Orazio (Failed PAT by Frantz) – 54–41 KC

=== Week 2: at Colorado Crush ===
	1	2	3	4	Total
KC	7	7	13	13	40
COL	3	17	7	17	44

at Pepsi Center, Denver, Colorado

- Game time: March 10, 2007 at 7:10 PM MST
- Game attendance: 15,126
- Officials: Barry Anderson, Rick Lowe, Brent Durbin, Art Lucky, Scott Helverson, Dave Einspahr
- Offensive Player of the Game: Willie Quinnie (COL)
- Defensive Player of the Game: Anthony Dunn (COL)
- Ironman of the Game: Robert Thomas (COL)

Scoring Summary:

1st Quarter:

- 09:28 COL – 21 yd FG by Ball – 3–0 COL
- 06:33 KC – 6 yd TD Run by Myers (PAT by Rush) – 7–3 KC

2nd Quarter:

- 14:17 COL – 5 yd TD Pass to Harrell from Dutton (PAT by Ball) – 10–7 COL
- 06:31 COL – 7 yd TD Pass to Quinnie from Dutton (PAT by Ball) – 17–7 COL
- 00:10 KC – 6 yd TD Pass to Frederick from Philyaw (PAT by Rush) – 17–14 COL
- 00:00 COL – 38 yd FG by Ball – 20–14 COL

3rd Quarter:

- 10:12 KC – 4 yd TD Pass to Myers from Philyaw (Failed PAT by Ball) – 20–20
- 07:01 COL – 1 yd TD Run by Thomas (PAT by Ball) – 27–20 COL
- 03:30 KC – 7 yd TD Pass to Brown from Philyaw (PAT by Rush) – 27–27

4th Quarter:

- 14:20 COL – 13 yd TD Pass to Quinnie from Dutton (PAT by Ball) – 34–27 COL
- 06:31 COL – 22 yd FG by Ball – 37–27 COL
- 02:39 KC – 11 yd TD Pass to Frederick from Philyaw (PAT by Rush) – 37–34 COL
- 00:56 COL – 10 yd TD Pass to Harrell from Dutton (PAT by Ball) – 44–34 COL
- 00:27 KC – 24 yd TD Pass to Myers from Philyaw (Failed PAT by Rush) – 44–40 COL

=== Week 3: vs Dallas Desperados ===
	1	2	3	4	Total
DAL	14	17	14	21	66
KC	7	14	13	20	54

at Kemper Arena, Kansas City, Missouri

- Game time: March 16, 2007 at 7:00 PM CDT
- Game attendance: 10,007
- Officials: Dave Cutaia, Doug Wilson, Greg Shields, Dave Chesney, James Cole
- Offensive Player of the Game: Josh White (DAL)
- Defensive Player of the Game: DaShane Dennis (KC)
- Ironman of the Game: Will Pettis (DAL)

Scoring Summary:

1st Quarter:

- 09:25 DAL – 2 yd TD Run by White (PAT by Sievers) – 7–0 DAL
- 03:42 DAL – 4 yd TD Run by White (PAT by Sievers) – 14–0 DAL
- 01:15 KC – 6 yd TD Run by Frederick (PAT by Rush) – 14–7 DAL

2nd Quarter:

- 14:16 DAL – 3 yd TD Run by Nash (PAT by Sievers) – 21–7 DAL
- 08:00 KC – 9 yd TD Pass to Simmons from Philyaw (PAT by Rush) – 21–14 DAL
- 03:20 DAL – 28 yd TD Pass to Nash from Dolezel (PAT by Sievers) – 28–14 DAL
- 00:46 KC – 3 yd TD Run by Frederick (PAT by Rush) – 28–21 DAL
- 00:00 DAL – 16 yd FG by Sievers – 31–21 DAL

3rd Quarter:

- 10:50 KC – 3 yd TD Run by Frederick (Failed PAT by Rush) – 31–27 DAL
- 07:02 DAL – 1 yd TD Run by White (PAT by Sievers) – 38–27 DAL
- 03:59 KC – 24 yd TD Pass to Frederick from Davis (PAT by Rush) – 38–34 DAL
- 00:28 DAL – 1 yd TD Run by White (PAT by Sievers) – 45–34 DAL

4th Quarter:

- 09:53 DAL – 10 yd TD Pass to Nash from Dolezel (PAT by Sievers) – 52–34 DAL
- 05:49 KC – 2 yd TD Pass to Frederick from Philyaw (PAT by Rush) – 52–41 DAL
- 04:40 DAL – 8 yd TD Run by White (PAT by Sievers) – 59–41 DAL
- 02:39 KC – 30 yd TD Pass to Simmons from Philyaw (PAT by Rush) – 59–48 DAL
- 01:15 DAL – 4 yd TD Pass to Marshall from Dolezel (PAT by Sievers) – 66–48 DAL
- 00:44 KC – 0 yd Fumble Recovery TD by Cohen (Failed Pass Attempt from Philyaw) – 66–54 DAL

=== Week 5: vs Arizona Rattlers ===
	1	2	3	4	OT	Total
ARI	14	13	14	14	6	61
KC	13	0	14	28	7	62

at Kemper Arena, Kansas City, Missouri

- Game time: March 30, 2007 at 7:00 PM CDT
- Game attendance: 8,512
- Officials: Dave Lambros, Al Granado, Mike McCabe, Brian Matthew, Joe Duncan
- Offensive Player of the Game: Raymond Philyaw (KC)
- Defensive Player of the Game: Denario Smalls (KC)
- Ironman of the Game: Charles Frederick (KC)

Scoring Summary:

1st Quarter:

- 09:41 – ARI – 5 yd TD Pass to Harvey from Bonner (PAT by Kral) – 7–0 ARI
- 06:45 – KC – 19 yd TD Pass to Myers from Philyaw (Failed PAT by Rush) – 7–6 ARI
- 02:48 – ARI – 2 yd TD Run by Kelly (PAT by Kral) – 14–6 ARI
- 00:29 – KC – 19 yd TD Pass to Frederick from Philyaw (PAT by Rush) – 14–13 ARI

2nd Quarter:

- 11:53 – ARI – 2 yd TD Run by Kelly (Failed PAT by Kral) – 20–13 ARI
- 06:07 – ARI – 42 yd TD Pass to Harvey from Bonner (PAT by Kral) – 27–13 ARI

3rd Quarter:

- 13:56 – KC – 8 yd Fumble Recovery TD by Douzart (PAT by Rush) – 27–20 ARI
- 07:42 – ARI – 2 yd TD Pass to McKenzie from Bonner (PAT by Kral) – 34–20 ARI
- 04:10 – ARI – 16 yd TD Pass to Pope from Bonner (PAT by Kral) – 41–20 ARI
- 01:40 – KC – 32 yd TD Pass to Myers from Philyaw (PAT by Rush) – 41–27 ARI

4th Quarter:

- 14:23 – KC – 1 yd TD Run by Frederick (PAT by Rush) – 41–34 ARI
- 13:17 – KC – 42 yd Interception Return TD by Smalls (PAT by Rush) – 41–41
- 09:51 – ARI – 5 yd TD Pass to Harvey from Bonner (Failed PAT by Kral) – 47–41 ARI
- 05:08 – KC – 1 yd TD Run by Philyaw (PAT by Rush) – 48–47 KC
- 00:35 – KC – 18 yd TD Pass to Williams from Philyaw (PAT by Rush) – 55–47 KC
- 00:05 – ARI – 20 yd TD Pass to Harvey from Bonner (Pass Attempt to Pope from Kral) – 55–55

Overtime:

- 14:26 – KC – 35 yd TD Pass to Williams from Philyaw (PAT by Rush) – 62–55 KC
- 12:20 – ARI – 31 yd TD Pass to McKenzie from Bonner (Failed Pass Attempt from Kral) – 62–61 KC

=== Week 6: at Las Vegas Gladiators ===
	1	2	3	4	Total
KC	20	21	21	3	65
LV	3	14	7	7	31

at Orleans Arena, Las Vegas, Nevada

- Game time: April 8, 2007 at 3:05 PM PDT
- Game attendance: 4,838
- Officials: Tom McCabe, Paul Frerking, Rod Pearson, Bob McElwee, Tony Lombardo
- Offensive Player of the Game: Raymond Philyaw (KC)
- Defensive Player of the Game: B.J. Cohen (KC)
- Ironman of the Game: Ira Gooch (KC)

Scoring Summary:

1st Quarter:

- 12:17 – LV – 39 yd FG by Azar – 3–0 LV
- 10:59 – KC – 13 yd TD Pass to Frederick from Philyaw (PAT by Rush) – 7–3 KC
- 07:16 – KC – 23 yd TD Pass to Gooch from Philyaw (PAT by Rush) – 14–3 KC
- 00:36 – KC – 42 yd TD Pass to Frederick from Philyaw (Failed PAT by Rush) – 20–3 KC

2nd Quarter:

- 14:25 – KC – 2 yd TD Run by Moss (PAT by Rush) – 27–3 KC
- 11:33 – KC – 38 yd TD Pass to Myers from Philyaw (PAT by Rush) – 34–3 KC
- 09:01 – LV – 39 yd TD Pass to Quattlebaum from King (PAT by Azar) – 34–10 KC
- 04:32 – KC – 18 yd TD Pass to Frederick from Philyaw (PAT by Rush) – 41–10 KC
- 00:25 – LV – 6 yd TD Pass to Quattlebaum from King (PAT by Azar) – 41–17 KC

3rd Quarter:

- 12:05 – KC – 1 yd TD Run by Frederick (PAT by Rush) – 48–17 KC
- 08:30 – LV – 5 yd TD Pass to Quattlebaum from King (PAT by Azar) – 48–24 KC
- 04:11 – KC – 29 yd TD Pass to Gooch from Philyaw (PAT by Rush) – 55–24 KC
- 01:35 – KC – 28 yd Interception Return TD by McEntyre (PAT by Rush) – 62–24 KC

4th Quarter:

- 06:20 – LV – 1 yd TD Run by Rue (PAT by Azar) – 62–31 KC
- 02:00 – KC – 28 yd FG by Rush – 65–31 KC

=== Week 7: vs Grand Rapids Rampage ===
	1	2	3	4	Total
GR	7	19	7	8	41
KC	20	16	6	10	52

at Kemper Arena, Kansas City, Missouri

- Game time: April 14, 2007 at 7:00 PM CDT
- Game attendance: 11,288
- Officials: Riley Johnson, Wes Fritz, Neil Brunner, Paul Engelbets, Bud McCleskey
- Offensive Player of the Game: Raymond Philyaw (KC)
- Defensive Player of the Game: Isaiah Trufant (KC)
- Ironman of the Game: Timon Marshall (GR)

Scoring Summary:

1st Quarter:

- 10:54 – KC – 9 yd TD Pass to Williams from Philyaw (Failed Rush Attempt by Rush) – 6–0 KC
- 07:19 – KC – 9 yd TD Pass to Williams from Philyaw (PAT by Rush) – 13–0 KC
- 04:01 – GR – 9 yd TD Pass to Marshall from Salisbury (PAT by Gowins) – 13–7 KC
- 02:03 – KC – 31 yd TD Pass to Gooch from Philyaw (PAT by Rush) – 20–7 KC

2nd Quarter:

- 10:34 – GR – 1 yd TD Run by Ryan (Failed PAT by Gowins) – 20–13 KC
- 10:34 – KC – PAT Return by McEntyre – 22–13 KC
- 09:17 – KC – 30 yd TD Pass to Williams from Philyaw (PAT by Rush) – 29–13 KC
- 05:30 – GR – 3 yd TD Run by Ryan (Failed PAT by Gowins) – 29–19 KC
- 00:24 – KC – 1 yd TD Run by Williams (PAT by Rush) – 36–19 KC
- 00:15 – GR – 51 yd Kickoff Return TD by Marshall (PAT by Gowins) – 36–26 KC

3rd Quarter:

- 14:24 – GR – 18 yd TD Pass to Anderson from Salisbury (PAT by Gowins) – 36–33 KC
- 06:25 – KC – 8 yd TD Pass to Moore from Philyaw (Failed PAT by Rush) – 42–33 KC

4th Quarter:

- 11:42 – KC – 12 yd TD Pass to Gooch from Philyaw (PAT by Rush) – 49–33 KC
- 06:07 – GR – 15 yd TD Pass to Anderson from Salisbury (Pass Attempt to McGill from Salisbury) – 49–41 KC
- 02:46 – KC – 24 yd FG by Rush – 52–41 KC

=== Week 8: at Nashville Kats ===
	1	2	3	4	Total
KC	7	14	13	6	40
NAS	7	21	14	7	49

at Sommet Center, Nashville, Tennessee

- Game time: April 21, 2007 at 7:00 PM CDT
- Game attendance: 8,143
- Officials: Barry Anderson, Rick Lowe, Brent Durbin, Art Lucky, Scott Helverson, Jim Lowery
- Offensive Player of the Game: Dan Alexander (NAS)
- Defensive Player of the Game: Ahmad Hawkins (NAS)
- Ironman of the Game: Maurice Brown (NAS)

Scoring Summary:

1st Quarter:

- 08:36 – NAS – 3 yd TD Run by Alexander (PAT by Witczak) – 7–0 NAS
- 04:44 – KC – 10 yd TD Pass to Williams from Philyaw (PAT by Rush) – 7–7

2nd Quarter:

- 14:56 – NAS – 11 yd TD Run by Alexander (PAT by Witczak) – 14–7 NAS
- 11:53 – NAS – 1 yd TD Run by Alexander (PAT by Witczak) – 21–7 NAS
- 08:27 – KC – 2 yd TD Run by Frederick (PAT by Rush) – 21–14 NAS
- 03:20 – NAS – 3 yd TD Run by Alexander (PAT by Witczak) – 28–14 NAS
- 00:15 – KC – 5 yd TD Pass to Myers from Philyaw (PAT by Rush) – 28–21 NAS

3rd Quarter:

- 11:54 – KC – 3 yd TD Pass to Myers from Philyaw (PAT by Rush) – 28–28
- 10:15 – NAS – 18 yd TD Run by Alexander (PAT by Witczak) – 35–28 NAS
- 05:17 – KC – 7 yd TD Pass to Myers from Philyaw (Failed PAT by Rush) – 35–34 NAS
- 03:27 – NAS – 7 yd TD Pass to Higgins from Smoker (PAT by Witczak) – 42–34 NAS

4th Quarter:

- 11:07 – KC – 19 yd TD Pass to Myers from Philyaw (Failed PAT by Rush) – 42–40 NAS
- 04:17 – NAS – 1 yd TD Run by Alexander (PAT by Witczak) – 49–40 NAS

=== Week 9: vs Colorado Crush ===
	1	2	3	4	Total
COL	14	10	7	14	45
KC	7	14	7	14	42

at Kemper Arena, Kansas City, Missouri

- Game time: April 27, 2007 at 7:00 PM CDT
- Game attendance: 11,246
- Officials: Steve Pamon, Rick Podraza, Julian Mapp, R.G. Detillier, Reggie Smith
- Offensive Player of the Game: John Dutton (COL)
- Defensive Player of the Game: Rashad Floyd (COL)
- Ironman of the Game: Charles Frederick (KC)

Scoring Summary:

1st Quarter:

- 12:30 – COL – 24 yd TD Pass to Harrell from Dutton (PAT by Ball) – 7–0 COL
- 08:06 – KC – 2 yd TD Run by Moss (PAT by Rush) – 7–7
- 02:00 – COL – 11 yd TD Pass to Harrell from Dutton (PAT by Ball) – 14–7 COL

2nd Quarter:

- 13:57 – KC – 5 yd TD Pass to Frederick from Philyaw (PAT by Rush) – 14–14
- 04:33 – COL – 7 yd TD Pass to Harrell from Dutton (PAT by Ball) – 21–14 COL
- 00:51 – KC – 1 yd TD Run by Moss (PAT by Rush) – 21–21
- 00:06 – COL – 32 yd FG by Ball – 24–21 COL

3rd Quarter:

- 12:08 – KC – 5 yd TD Run by Moss (PAT by Rush) – 28–24 KC
- 08:12 – COL – 10 yd TD Pass to Nix from Dutton (PAT by Ball) – 31–28 COL

4th Quarter:

- 12:33 – COL – 1 yd TD Run by Harmon (PAT by Ball) – 38–28 COL
- 02:57 – KC – 7 yd TD Pass to Williams from Philyaw (PAT by Rush) – 38–35 COL
- 01:26 – COL – 39 yd TD Pass to Pyatt from Dutton (PAT by Ball) – 45–35 COL
- 00:17 – KC – 10 yd TD Pass to Williams from Philyaw (PAT by Rush) – 45–42 COL

=== Week 10: at Philadelphia Soul ===
	1	2	3	4	Total
KC	14	19	0	20	53
PHI	6	14	7	14	41

at Wachovia Center, Philadelphia, Pennsylvania

- Game time: May 5, 2007 at 7:00 PM EDT
- Game attendance: 17,493
- Officials: Steven Parnon, Wes Fritz, Neil Brunner, Paul Engelberts, Reggie Smith, Ron Pollack
- Offensive Player of the Game: Raymond Philyaw (KC)
- Defensive Player of the Game: Nick Ward (KC)
- Ironman of the Game: Charles Pauley (PHI)

Scoring Summary:

1st Quarter:

- 11:04 – KC – 7 yd TD Pass to Williams from Philyaw (PAT by Rush) – 7–0 KC
- 09:27 – PHI – 10 yd TD Run by Wood (Failed PAT by France) – 7–6 KC
- 05:42 – KC – 1 yd TD Run by Frederick (PAT by Rush) – 14–6 KC

2nd Quarter:

- 12:04 – PHI – 40 yd TD Pass to Pauley from Wood (PAT by France) – 14–13 KC
- 09:02 – KC – 17 yd TD Pass to Frederick from Philyaw (Failed PAT by Rush) – 20–13 KC
- 06:09 – PHI – 22 yd TD Pass to Pauley from Wood (PAT by France) – 20–20
- 01:39 – KC – 4 yd TD Pass to Myers from Philyaw (PAT by Rush) – 27–20 KC
- 00:03 – KC – 9 yd TD Pass to Frederick from Philyaw (Failed PAT by Rush) – 33–20 KC

3rd Quarter:

- 03:43 – PHI – 24 yd TD Pass to McKelvey from Wood (PAT by France) – 33–27 KC

4th Quarter:

- 14:57 – KC – 1 yd TD Run by Frederick (Failed PAT by Rush) – 39–27 KC
- 11:57 – PHI – 5 yd TD Pass to James from Wood (PAT by France) – 39–34 KC
- 09:41 – KC – 15 yd TD Pass to Williams from Philyaw (PAT by Rush) – 46–34 KC
- 05:39 – PHI – 8 yd TD Pass to McKelvey from Wood (PAT by France) – 46–41 KC
- 00:52 – KC – 7 yd TD Pass to Williams from Philyaw (PAT by Rush) – 53–31 KC

=== Week 11: vs Utah Blaze ===
	1	2	3	4	Total
UTA	7	0	20	14	41
KC	14	26	14	6	60

at Kemper Arena, Kansas City, Missouri

- Game time: May 12, 2007 at 7:00 PM CDT
- Game attendance: 13,655
- Officials: Perry Havener, Tom Laverty, Bill Ward, David Meslow, Jim DeBell
- Offensive Player of the Game: Raymond Philyaw (KC)
- Defensive Player of the Game: Nick Ward (KC)
- Ironman of the Game: Boo Williams (KC)

Scoring Summary:

1st Quarter:

- 12:17 – KC – 12 yd TD Pass to Williams from Philyaw (PAT by Kral) – 7–0 KC
- 07:47 – UTA – 4 yd TD Run by Pace (PAT by Videtich) – 7–7
- 05:53 – KC – 10 yd TD Pass to Frederick from Philyaw (PAT by Kral) – 14–7 KC

2nd Quarter:

- 14:14 – KC – 28 yd TD Pass to Hines from Philyaw (Failed PAT by Kral) – 20–7 KC
- 11:13 – KC – 26 yd TD Pass to Hines from Philyaw (Failed Rush Attempt by Kral) – 26–7 KC
- 01:00 – KC – 6 yd TD Pass to Williams from Philyaw (PAT by Kral) – 33–7 KC
- 00:00 – KC – 12 yd TD Pass to Williams from Philyaw (PAT by Kral) – 40–7 KC

3rd Quarter:

- 10:36 – UTA – 8 yd TD Pass to Burley from Germaine (Failed PAT by Videtich) – 40–13 KC
- 09:08 – KC – 9 yd TD Pass to Frederick from Philyaw (PAT by Kral) – 47–13 KC
- 03:48 – UTA – 5 yd TD Pass to Skaggs from Germaine (PAT by Videtich) – 47–20 KC
- 01:43 – KC – 7 yd TD Run by Frederick (PAT by Kral) – 54–20 KC
- 00:30 – UTA – 30 yd TD Pass to Burley from Germaine (PAT by Videtich) – 54–27 KC

4th Quarter:

- 06:07 – KC – 18 yd TD Pass to Myers from Philyaw (Failed PAT by Kral) – 60–27 KC
- 03:38 – UTA – 8 yd TD Pass to Pace from Germaine (PAT by Videtich) – 60–34 KC
- 00:48 – UTA – 8 yd TD Pass to Burley from Germaine (PAT by Videtich) – 60–41 KC

=== Week 12: at New York Dragons ===
	1	2	3	4	Total
KC	14	14	7	21	56
NYD	21	21	13	7	62

at Nassau Veterans Memorial Coliseum, Uniondale, New York

- Game time: May 20, 2007 at 1:05 PM EDT
- Game attendance: 8,798
- Officials: Dave Lambros, Paul King, Wayne Mackie, Brian Matthew, Joe Duncan, Robert Benson
- Offensive Player of the Game: Aaron Garcia (NYD), Josh Shaw (NYD)
- Defensive Player of the Game: Will Holder (NYD)
- Ironman of the Game: DaShane Dennis (NYD)

Scoring Summary:

1st Quarter:

- 13:10 – NYD – 21 yd TD Pass to Willis from Garcia (PAT by Warley) – 7–0 NYD
- 11:46 – KC – 18 yd TD Pass to Frederick from Philyaw (PAT by Kral) – 7–7
- 10:39 – NYD – 40 yd TD Pass to Swayne from Garcia (PAT by Warley) – 14–7 NYD
- 07:01 – KC – 8 yd TD Pass to Frederick from Philyaw (PAT by Kral) – 14–14
- 02:12 – NYD – 3 yd TD Pass to Willis from Garcia (PAT by Warley) – 21–14 NYD

2nd Quarter:

- 14:56 – KC – 11 yd TD Pass to Frederick from Philyaw (PAT by Kral) – 21–21
- 12:11 – NYD – 18 yd TD Pass to Swayne from Garcia (PAT by Warley) – 28–21 NYD
- 10:08 – KC – 24 yd TD Pass to Frederick from Philyaw (PAT by Kral) – 28–28
- 05:38 – NYD – 4 yd TD Pass to Horacek from Garcia (PAT by Warley) – 35–28 NYD
- 00:13 – NYD – 4 yd TD Pass to Swayne from Garcia (PAT by Warley) – 42–28 NYD

3rd Quarter:

- 12:53 – NYD – 5 yd TD Pass to Swayne from Garcia (Failed PAT by Warley) – 48–28 NYD
- 06:15 – KC – 16 yd TD Pass to Frederick from Philyaw (PAT by Kral) – 48–35 NYD
- 05:12 – NYD – 8 yd TD Pass to Swayne from Garcia (PAT by Warley) – 55–35 NYD

4th Quarter:

- 10:46 – KC – 33 yd TD Pass to Myers from Philyaw (PAT by Kral) – 55–42 NYD
- 09:00 – NYD – 7 yd TD Pass to Hall from Garcia (PAT by Warley) – 62–42 NYD
- 05:12 – KC – 7 yd TD Pass to Myers from Philyaw (PAT by Kral) – 62–49 NYD
- 00:50 – KC – 27 yd TD Pass to Williams from Philyaw (PAT by Kral) – 62–56 NYD

=== Week 13: vs Los Angeles Avengers ===
	1	2	3	4	Total
LA	14	0	21	21	56
KC	14	20	7	21	62

at Kemper Arena, Kansas City, Missouri

- Game time: May 26, 2007 at 5:00 PM CDT
- Game attendance: 13,213
- Officials: Barry Anderson, Rick Lowe, Kelly Saalfeld, Art Lucky, Scott Heiverson
- Offensive Player of the Game: Charles Frederick (KC)
- Defensive Player of the Game: Travis Coleman (KC)
- Ironman of the Game: Boo Williams (KC)

Scoring Summary:

1st Quarter:

- 12:52 – KC – 12 yd TD Pass to Williams from Philyaw (PAT by Kral) – 7–0 KC
- 09:32 – LA – 1 yd TD Run by Ford (PAT by Hamilton) – 7–7
- 07:30 – KC – 8 yd TD Pass to Williams from Philyaw (PAT by Kral) – 14–7 KC
- 03:39 – LA – 9 yd TD Pass to Stubbs from Cumbie (PAT by Hamilton) – 14–14

2nd Quarter:

- 09:03 – KC – 6 yd TD Pass to Frederick from Philyaw (PAT by Kral) – 21–14 KC
- 02:34 – KC – 9 yd TD Pass to Frederick from Philyaw (PAT by Kral) – 28–14 KC
- 00:00 – KC – 1 yd TD Run by Moss (Failed PAT by Kral) – 34–14 KC

3rd Quarter:

- 10:09 – LA – 18 yd TD Pass to Turner from Cumbie (PAT by Hamilton) – 34–21 KC
- 04:57 – LA – 2 yd TD Run by Ford (PAT by Hamilton) – 34–28 KC
- 02:41 – KC – 5 yd TD Pass to Frederick from Philyaw (PAT by Kral) – 41–28 KC
- 01:21 – LA – 47 yd TD Pass to Flowers from Cumbie (PAT by Hamilton) – 41–35 KC

4th Quarter:

- 12:58 – KC – 1 yd TD Run by Philyaw (PAT by Kral) – 48–35 KC
- 11:40 – KC – 18 yd Interception Return TD by Coleman (PAT by Kral) – 55–35 KC
- 02:02 – LA – 31 yd TD Pass to Ward from Cumbie (PAT by Hamilton) – 55–42 KC
- 00:58 – KC – 11 yd TD Run by Moss (PAT by Kral) – 62–42 KC
- 00:32 – LA – 3 yd TD Pass to Turner from Cumbie (PAT by Hamilton) – 62–49 KC
- 00:05 – LA – 9 yd TD Pass to Turner from Cumbie (PAT by Hamilton) – 62–56 KC

=== Week 14: at Grand Rapids Rampage ===
	1	2	3	4	Total
KC	7	14	12	33	66
GR	17	20	6	10	53

at Van Andel Arena, Grand Rapids, Michigan

- Game time: June 2, 2007 at 7:00 PM EDT
- Game attendance: 5,074
- Officials: Bill LeMonnier, Mike Delaney, Allen Baynes, Dana McKenzie, Billie Beckett
- Offensive Player of the Game: Raymond Philyaw (KC)
- Defensive Player of the Game: Bryan Henderson (GR)
- Ironman of the Game: Charles Frederick (KC)

Scoring Summary:

1st Quarter:

- 13:46 – GR – 11 yd TD Pass to Marshall from Salisbury (PAT by Gowins) – 7–0 GR
- 11:14 – GR – 2 yd TD Run by Ryan (PAT by Gowins) – 14–0 GR
- 07:35 – KC – 13 yd TD Pass to Frederick from Philyaw (PAT by Kral) – 14–7 GR
- 03:23 – GR – 42 yd FG by Gowins – 17–7 GR

2nd Quarter:

- 14:56 – KC – 17 yd TD Run by Moss (PAT by Kral) – 17–14 GR
- 13:06 – GR – 29 yd TD Pass to Marshall from Salisbury (PAT by Gowins) – 24–14 GR
- 02:40 – GR – 1 yd TD Run by Ryan (Failed PAT by Gowins) – 30–14 GR
- 00:28 – KC – 21 yd TD Pass to Hines from Philyaw (PAT by Kral) – 30–21 GR
- 00:02 – GR – 17 yd TD Pass to Bonner from Salisbury (PAT by Gowins) – 37–21 GR

3rd Quarter:

- 11:34 – KC – 2 yd TD Pass to Moss from Philyaw (Failed PAT by Kral) – 37–27 GR
- 08:00 – GR – 8 yd TD Pass to Marshall from Salisbury (Failed PAT by Gowins) – 43–27 GR
- 03:24 – KC – 7 yd TD Pass to Frederick from Philyaw (Failed PAT by Kral) – 43–33 GR

4th Quarter:

- 14:56 – GR – 20 yd FG by Gowins – 46–33 GR
- 13:15 – KC – 26 yd TD Pass to Hines from Philyaw (Rush Attempt by Philyaw) – 46–41 GR
- 10:15 – KC – 18 yd TD Pass to Myers from Philyaw (Failed PAT by Kral) – 47–46 KC
- 07:27 – KC – 30 yd Interception Return TD by McEntyre (Failed PAT by Kral) – 53–46 KC
- 02:16 – KC – 28 yd TD Pass to Frederick from Philyaw (Failed PAT by Kral) – 59–46 KC
- 00:41 – GR – 5 yd TD Run by McPherson (PAT by Gowins) – 59–53 KC
- 00:17 – KC – 1 yd TD Pass to Hines from Philyaw (PAT by Kral) – 66–53 KC

=== Week 15: at Columbus Destroyers ===
	1	2	3	4	Total
KC	0	27	7	13	47
CLB	6	7	0	21	34

at Nationwide Arena, Columbus, Ohio

- Game time: June 8, 2007 at 7:08 PM EDT
- Game attendance: 13,803
- Officials: Steve Pamon, Wes Fritz, Neil Brunner, Paul Engelberts, Reggie Smith, Paul Hummel
- Offensive Player of the Game: Raymond Philyaw (KC)
- Defensive Player of the Game: Travis Coleman (KC)
- Ironman of the Game: B.J. Cohen (KC)

Scoring Summary:

1st Quarter:

- 00:47 – CLB – 3 yd TD Pass to Knight from Nagy (Failed PAT by Martinez) – 6–0 CLB

2nd Quarter:

- 14:49 – KC – 30 yd TD Pass to Myers from Philyaw (Failed PAT by Kral) – 6–6
- 10:33 – KC – 16 yd TD Pass to Myers from Philyaw (PAT by Kral) – 13–6 KC
- 06:23 – CLB – 3 yd TD Run by Wells (PAT by Martinez) – 13–13
- 04:26 – KC – 32 yd TD Pass to Gooch from Philyaw (PAT by Kral) – 20–13 KC
- 00:17 – KC – 14 yd TD Pass to Frederick from Philyaw (PAT by Kral) – 27–13 KC

3rd Quarter:

- 02:14 – KC – 8 yd TD Pass to Hines from Philyaw (PAT by Kral) – 34–13 KC

4th Quarter:

- 14:56 – CLB – 1 yd TD Run by Wells (PAT by Martinez) – 34–20 KC
- 12:32 – KC – 5 yd TD Pass to Frederick from Philyaw (PAT by Kral) – 41–20 KC
- 05:25 – CLB – 3 yd TD Pass to Solomon from Nagy (Pass Attempt to Saunders from Nagy) – 41–28 KC
- 03:25 – KC – 13 yd TD Pass to Ward from Philyaw (Failed Pass Attempt from Davis) – 47–28 KC
- 00:30 – CLB – 14 yd TD Pass to Solomon from Nagy (Failed PAT by Nagy) – 47–34

=== Week 16: vs Nashville Kats ===
	1	2	3	4	Total
NAS	14	13	14	22	63
KC	17	20	9	20	66

at Kemper Arena, Kansas City, Missouri

- Game time: June 16, 2007 at 7:08 PM CDT
- Game attendance: 13,596
- Officials: Tom McCabe, Paul Frerking, Rod Pearson, Bob McElwee, Tony Lombardo
- Offensive Player of the Game: Raymond Philyaw (KC)
- Defensive Player of the Game: Kenny McEntyre (KC)
- Ironman of the Game: C. J. Johnson (NAS)

Scoring Summary:

1st Quarter:

- 13:55 – KC – 13 yd TD Pass to Gooch from Philyaw (PAT by Kral) – 7–0 KC
- 13:27 – NAS – 52 yd Kickoff Return TD by Johnson (PAT by Witczak) – 7–7
- 08:52 – NAS – 3 yd TD Run by Alexander (PAT by Witczak) – 14–7 NAS
- 05:22 – KC – 25 yd FG by Kral – 14–10 NAS
- 04:10 – KC – 33 yd Interception Return TD by McEntyre (PAT by Kral) – 17–14 KC

2nd Quarter:

- 12:49 – KC – 13 yd TD Pass to Frederick from Philyaw (PAT by Kral) – 24–14 KC
- 11:54 – NAS – 57 yd Kickoff Return TD by Johnson (Failed PAT by Witczak) – 24–20 KC
- 04:14 – KC – 1 yd TD Run by Frederick (Failed PAT by Kral) – 30–20 KC
- 00:45 – NAS – 4 yd TD Pass to Johnson from Kohn (PAT by Witczak) – 30–27 KC
- 00:10 – KC – 23 yd TD Pass to Myers from Philyaw (PAT by Kral) – 37–27 KC

3rd Quarter:

- 12:11 – NAS – 1 yd TD Run by Alexander (PAT by Witczak) – 37–34 KC
- 10:03 – KC – Safety by Dixon – 39–30 KC
- 08:16 – KC – 9 yd TD Pass to Myers from Philyaw (PAT by Kral) – 46–34 KC
- 02:20 – NAS – 3 yd TD Pass to Minucci from Kohn (PAT by Witczak) – 46–41 KC

4th Quarter:

- 10:08 – KC – 1 yd TD Run by Frederick (PAT by Kral) – 53–41 KC
- 07:30 – NAS – 11 yd TD Pass to Higgins from Kohn (PAT by Witczak) – 53–48 KC
- 05:26 – KC – 20 yd TD Pass to Hines from Philyaw (Failed PAT by Kral) – 59–48 KC
- 03:41 – NAS – 24 yd TD Pass to Johnson from Kohn (Rush Attempt by Elpheage) – 59–56 KC
- 02:41 – KC – 11 yd Kickoff Return TD by Smalls (PAT by Kral) – 66–56 KC
- 00:35 – NAS – 22 yd TD Pass to Johnson from Kohn (PAT by Witczak) – 66–63 KC
- Attendance: 13,596
- Offensive Player of the Game: Raymond Philyaw (KC)
- Defensive Player of the Game: Kenny McEntyre (KC)
- Ironman of the Game: C. J. Johnson (NAS)

=== Week 17: at Chicago Rush ===
	1	2	3	4	Total
KC	14	7	0	0	21
CHI	14	14	17	3	48

at Allstate Arena, Rosemont, Illinois

- Game time: June 23, 2007 at 7:08 PM CDT
- Game attendance: 16,391
- Officials: Perry Havener, Tom Laverty, Bill Ward, David Meslow, Keith Washington, Marc Grossman
- Offensive Player of the Game: Matt D'Orazio (CHI)
- Defensive Player of the Game: DeJuan Alfonzo (CHI)

Scoring Summary:

1st Quarter:

- 11:15 – CHI – 7 yd TD Pass to Mager from D`Orazio (PAT by Frantz) – 7–0 CHI
- 08:22 – KC – 33 yd TD Pass to Myers from Philyaw (PAT by Kral) – 7–7
- 05:00 – CHI – 4 yd TD Pass to Sippio from D`Orazio (PAT by Frantz) – 14–7 CHI
- 02:15 – KC – 37 yd TD Pass to Hines from Philyaw (PAT by Kral) – 14–14

2nd Quarter:

- 11:39 – CHI – 3 yd TD Pass to Sippio from D`Orazio (PAT by Frantz) – 21–14 CHI
- 05:56 – KC – 1 yd TD Pass to Moore from Philyaw (PAT by Kral) – 21–21
- 00:55 – CHI – 7 yd TD Run by McMillen (PAT by Frantz) – 28–21 CHI

3rd Quarter:

- 09:30 – CHI – 4 yd TD Pass to Sippio from D`Orazio (PAT by Frantz) – 35–21 CHI
- 03:02 – CHI – 20 yd FG by Frantz – 38–21 CHI
- 00:00 – CHI – 47 yd Interception Return TD by Alfonzo (PAT by Frantz) – 45–21 CHI

4th Quarter:

- 03:18 – CHI – 21 yd FG by Frantz – 48–21 CHI

== Playoffs ==
=== Round 1: vs (6) Colorado Crush ===
	1	2	3	4	Total
(6) COL	16	7	7	19	49
(3) KC	7	21	0	14	42

at Kemper Arena, Kansas City, Missouri

- Game time: June 30, 2007 at 2:00 PM CDT
- Game attendance: 9,539
- Officials: Dave Cutaia, Rick Olwe, Wayne Mackie, Dave Chesney, Jim Buchanan

Scoring Summary:

1st Quarter:

- 14:22 – COL – 38 yd TD Pass to Pyatt from Dutton (Failed PAT by Ball) – 6–0 COL
- 08:34 – COL – 1 yd TD Run by Thomas (PAT by Ball) – 13–0 COL
- 05:05 – KC – 7 yd TD Pass to Myers from Philyaw (PAT by Kral) – 13–7 COL
- 00:53 – COL – 19 yd FG by Ball – 16–7 COL

2nd Quarter:

- 12:51 – KC – 2 yd TD Run by Moss (PAT by Kral) – 16–14 COL
- 10:07 – COL – 5 yd TD Run by Kirsch (PAT by Ball) – 23–14 COL
- 07:12 – KC – 7 yd TD Pass to Hines from Philyaw (PAT by Kral) – 23–21 COL
- 03:18 – KC – 3 yd TD Pass to Hines from Philyaw (PAT by Kral) – 28–23 KC

3rd Quarter:

- 08:40 – COL – 21 yd TD Pass to Harrell from Dutton (PAT by Ball) – 30–28 COL

4th Quarter:

- 13:11 – COL – 4 yd TD Pass to Quinnie from Dutton (Failed PAT by Ball) – 36–28 COL
- 08:05 – KC – 6 yd TD Pass to Hines from Philyaw (PAT by Kral) – 36–35 COL
- 07:11 – COL – 4 yd TD Pass to Harrell from Dutton (Failed PAT by Ball) – 42–35 COL
- 04:57 – KC – 38 yd Interception Return TD by McEntyre (PAT by Kral) – 42–42
- 02:12 – COL – 4 yd TD Pass to Harrell from Dutton (PAT by Ball) – 49–42 COL
