= 2008 Kansas City Brigade season =

Season of American college football

- Head coach: Kevin Porter
- Home stadium: Sprint Center

Results
- Record: 3–13
- Division place: 4th
- Playoffs: Did not qualify

The 2008 Kansas City Brigade season was the third season for the franchise, second in the American Conference's Central Division. After starting the season with 6 consecutive losses, the Brigade finished the season with a 3–13 record, however still the worst record in the American Conference.

== Standings ==
Central Division
| Team | W | L | PCT | PF | PA | DIV | CON | Home | Away |
|---|---|---|---|---|---|---|---|---|---|
| z-Chicago Rush | 11 | 5 | .688 | 926 | 765 | 6–0 | 9–1 | 7–1 | 4–4 |
| x-Colorado Crush | 6 | 10 | .375 | 847 | 907 | 2–4 | 4–6 | 4–4 | 2–6 |
| x-Grand Rapids Rampage | 6 | 10 | .375 | 952 | 968 | 3–3 | 4–6 | 3–5 | 3–5 |
| Kansas City Brigade | 3 | 13 | .188 | 752 | 923 | 1–5 | 1–9 | 2–6 | 1–7 |

z - Clinched division and conference's best record
x - Clinched playoff berth

== Regular season schedule ==
| Week | Date | Opponent | Result | Record | Location | Attendance | Recap |
|---|---|---|---|---|---|---|---|
| 1 | March 1 | Tampa Bay Storm | L 49–51 | 0–1 | Sprint Center | 13,356 | Recap |
| 2 | March 9 | at New York Dragons | L 47–50 | 0–2 | Nassau Coliseum | 10,542 | Recap |
| 3 | Bye Week | | | | | | |
| 4 | March 24 | Grand Rapids Rampage | L 52–92 | 0–3 | Sprint Center | 12,943 | Recap |
| 5 | March 29 | San Jose SaberCats | L 36–44 | 0–4 | Sprint Center | 13,146 | Recap |
| 6 | April 4 | at Georgia Force | L 63–70 | 0–5 | The Arena at Gwinnett Center | 10,052 | Recap |
| 7 | April 14 | Chicago Rush | L 42–49 | 0–6 | Sprint Center | 13,184 | Recap |
| 8 | April 19 | Colorado Crush | W 55–53 | 1–6 | Sprint Center | 14,057 | Recap |
| 9 | April 25 | at Grand Rapids Rampage | L 38–72 | 1–7 | Van Andel Arena | 8,102 | Recap |
| 10 | May 3 | at Utah Blaze | L 50–67 | 1–8 | EnergySolutions Arena | 12,208 | Recap |
| 11 | May 10 | Columbus Destroyers | W 59–43 | 2–8 | Sprint Center | 12,736 | Recap |
| 12 | May 18 | Orlando Predators | L 51–58 | 2–9 | Sprint Center | 10,992 | Recap |
| 13 | May 22 | at Philadelphia Soul | W 54–47 | 3–9 | Wachovia Center | 14,473 | Recap |
| 14 | May 31 | at Chicago Rush | L 47–52 | 3–10 | Allstate Arena | 16,164 | Recap |
| 15 | June 8 | Arizona Rattlers | L 34–73 | 3–11 | Sprint Center | 12,210 | Recap |
| 16 | June 14 | at Los Angeles Avengers | L 48–51 | 3–10 | Staples Center | 11,282 | Recap |
| 17 | June 21 | at Colorado Crush | L 27–51 | 3–13 | Pepsi Center | 13,571 | Recap |

== Coaching ==
| Name | Title |
|---|---|
| Kevin Porter | Head Coach |
| Kelly Williams | Coaching Assistant |
| Ricky Foggie | Offensive Coordinator |
| Maurice Blanding | Defensive Coordinator |
| Otis Moore | Line Coach |
| Travis Crusenberry | Line Coach |
| Jared White | Head Athletic Trainer |

== Final roster ==
2008 Kansas City Brigade roster
| Quarterbacks: 11 D. Bryant; 16 John Fitzgerald; Fullbacks: 49 Dawan Moss; Wide receivers: 18 Charles Frederick; 2 Mike Horacek; 10 Jerel Myers; 4 James Robinson; 82 Boo Williams | Offensive linemen: 56 Chris Cook; 73 Larrell Johnson; 75 Ed Ta'amu; 99 Jamar Ward; Defensive linemen: 9 Chris Demaree; 95 Arrion Dixon; 91 Neil Purvis; 1 Jerry Turner | Linebackers: 34 Chris Avery; 24 Denario Smalls; Defensive backs: 12 Jerald Brown; 26 Will Holder; 25 Delmonico Montgomery; Kickers: 6 Peter Martinez | Injury reserve: 3 Kahlil Carter DB (IR); 8 Travis Coleman DB (IR); 14 Brandon Isaiah FB (IR); 15 Chris Jones DB (IR); 67 Jon Hall OL (IR); 98 Khaleed Vaughn DL (IR); Refused to report: currently vacant; Other league exempt: currently vacant; Suspension: currently vacant; Practice squad: 48 Antonio Ficklin LB; 17 Matt Kohn QB; 7 Ces’are Manning DB; 92 Joe Woolridge DL; rookies in italics Roster updated June 21, 2008; 22 Active, 6 Inactive, 4 PS → More rosters |

== Regular season ==
=== Week 1: vs Tampa Bay Storm ===
| Quarter | 1 | 2 | 3 | 4 | Total |
|---|---|---|---|---|---|
| TB | 7 | 16 | 14 | 14 | 51 |
| KC | 7 | 21 | 7 | 14 | 49 |

at Sprint Center, Kansas City, Missouri

- Date: March 1
- Game time: 6:00 PM EST
- Game attendance: 13,356

Game information

1st Quarter:

- 11:23 TB – Torrance Marshall 3 yd run (Seth Marler kick) – 7–0 TB
- 06:11 KC – John Fitzgerald 4 yd run (Peter Martinez kick) – 7–7

2nd Quarter:

- 12:13 KC – Charles Frederick 5 yd pass from John Fitzgerald (Peter Martinez kick) – 14–7 KC
- 08:18 TB – Brett Dietz 1 yd run (Seth Marler kick) – 14–14
- 05:54 KC – Mike Horacek 40 yd pass from John Fitzgerald (Peter Martinez kick) – 21–14 KC
- 02:44 TB – Torrance Marshall 1 yd run (Seth Marler kick failed) – 21–20 KC
- 00:11 KC – Mike Horacek 21 yd pass from John Fitzgerald (Peter Martinez kick) – 28–21 KC
- 00:00 TB – Seth Marler 34 yd field goal – 28–23 KC

3rd Quarter:

- 13:14 TB – Torrance Marshall 3 yd run (Seth Marler kick) – 30–28 TB
- 07:36 KC – Charles Frederick 1 yd pass from John Fitzgerald (Peter Martinez kick) – 35–30 KC
- 04:17 TB – Torrance Marshall 1 yd run (Seth Marler kick) – 37–35 TB

4th Quarter:

- 13:09 TB – Tom Kaleita 7 yd pass from Brett Dietz (Seth Marler kick) – 44–35 TB
- 07:02 KC – John Fitzgerald 1 yd run (Peter Martinez kick) – 44–42 TB
- 06:03 TB – Sedrick Robinson 23 yd pass from Brett Dietz (Seth Marler kick) – 51–42 TB
- 02:59 KC – Mike Horacek 23 yd pass from John Fitzgerald (Peter Martinez kick) – 51–49 TB
- Officials: Pat Garvey; Umpire: Paul King; Linesman: Bill Ward; Line judge: Bob McElwee; Back judge: James DeBell
- Offensive Player of the Game: Torrance Marshall (TB)
- Defensive Player of the Game: Monty Montgomery (KC)
- Ironman Player of the Game: Torrance Marshall (TB)

=== Week 2: at New York Dragons ===
| Quarter | 1 | 2 | 3 | 4 | Total |
|---|---|---|---|---|---|
| KC | 12 | 7 | 13 | 15 | 47 |
| NY | 7 | 9 | 14 | 20 | 50 |

at Nassau Veterans Memorial Coliseum, Uniondale, New York

- Date: March 9
- Game time: 3:00 PM EST
- Game attendance: 10,542

Game information

1st Quarter:

- 08:00 NY – WILLIS 15 yd pass from DAVEY (ONORATO kick) – 7–0 NY
- 05:47 KC – FITZGERALD 5 yd run (MARTINEZ kick failed) – 7–6 NY
- 01:03 KC – HORACEK 13 yd pass from FITZGERALD (MARTINEZ kick failed) – 12–7 KC

2nd Quarter:

- 00:53 NY – WILLIS 9 yd pass from DAVEY (ONORATO kick blocked) – 13–12 NY
- 00:20 KC – FITZGERALD 1 yd run (MARTINEZ kick) – 19–13 KC
- 00:00 NY – ONORATO 41 yd field goal – 19–16 KC

3rd Quarter:

- 14:31 KC – FREDERICK 45 yd pass from FITZGERALD (MARTINEZ kick) – 26–16 KC
- 13:13 NY – WILLIS 21 yd pass from DAVEY (ONORATO kick) – 26–23 KC
- 03:43 NY – WALKER 2 yd fumble recovery (ONORATO kick) – 30–26 NY
- 00:52 KC – MYERS 21 yd pass from FITZGERALD (MARTINEZ kick failed) – 32–30 KC

4th Quarter:

- 14:49 NY – HENRY 39 yd pass from DAVEY (ONORATO kick) – 37–32 NY
- 09:35 KC – FITZGERALD 1 yd run (MARTINEZ kick) – 39–37 KC
- 04:35 NY – ANTHONY 5 yd pass from DAVEY (ONORATO kick) – 44–39 NY
- 01:29 KC – HORACEK 22 yd pass from FITZGERALD (FREDERICK pass from FITZGERALD) – 47–44 KC
- 00:22 NY – WILLIS 2 yd pass from DAVEY (ONORATO kick failed) – 50–47 NY
- Officials: Referee: Perry Havener; Umpire: Tom Laverty; Linesman: Kavin McGrath; Line judge: David Meslow; Back judge: K. Washington
- Offensive Player of the Game: N/A
- Defensive Player of the Game: N/A
- Ironman Player of the Game: N/A

=== Week 3 ===
Bye Week

=== Week 4: vs. Grand Rapids Rampage ===
| Quarter | 1 | 2 | 3 | 4 | Total |
|---|---|---|---|---|---|
| GR | 14 | 34 | 23 | 21 | 92 |
| KC | 17 | 14 | 7 | 14 | 52 |

at Sprint Center, Kansas City, Missouri

- Date: March 24
- Game time: 8:00 PM EST
- Game attendance: 12,943

Game information

1st Quarter:

- 11:51 KC – Peter Martinez 29 yd field goal – 3–0 KC
- 11:29 GR – Anthony Hines 30 yd pass from James MacPherson (Brian Gowins kick) – 7–3 GR
- 10:29 KC – Jerel Myers 30 yd pass from Matt Kohn (Peter Martinez kick) – 10–7 KC
- 07:05 GR – T.J. Watkins 2 yd pass from James MacPherson (Brian Gowins kick) – 14–10 GR
- 03:08 KC – Mike Horacek 19 yd pass from Matt Kohn (Peter Martinez kick) – 17–14 KC

2nd Quarter:

- 14:54 GR – Kenny Higgins 28 yd pass from James MacPherson (Brian Gowins kick) – 21–17 GR
- 09:48 GR – Chris Johnson 10 yd pass from James MacPherson (Brian Gowins kick) – 28–17 GR
- 07:00 KC – Charles Frederick 3 yd run (Peter Martinez kick) – 28–24 GR
- 03:40 GR – Anthony Hines 15 yd pass from James MacPherson (Brian Gowins kick) 35–24 GR
- 02:59 GR – Kenny Higgins 0 yd fumble recovery (Brian Gowins kick) – 42–24 GR
- 00:58 KC – Matt Kohn 1 yd run (Peter Martinez kick) – 42–31 GR
- 00:21 GR – Anthony Hines 17 yd pass from James MacPherson (Brian Gowins kick failed) – 48–31 GR

3rd Quarter:

- 11:11 GR – Anthony Hines 5 yd pass from James MacPherson (Brian Gowins kick) – 55–31 GR
- 09:25 GR – TEAM safety – 57–31 GR
- 07:03 GR – Chris Johnson 4 yd pass from James MacPherson (Brian Gowins kick) – 64–31 GR
- 03:17 KC – Jerel Myers 5 yd pass from Matt Kohn (Peter Martinez kick) – 64–31 GR
- 00:22 GR – Jermaine Lewis 12 yd pass from James MacPherson (Brian Gowins kick) – 71–38 GR

4th Quarter:

- 14:38 GR – Adrian McPherson 4 yd run (Brian Gowins kick) – 78–38 GR
- 12:49 KC – James Robinson 4 yd pass from Matt Kohn (Peter Martinez kick) – 78–45 GR
- 11:47 GR – Chris Johnson 11 yd run (Brian Gowins kick) – 85–45 GR
- 07:57 GR – Adrian McPherson 20 yd run (Brian Gowins kick) – 92–45 GR
- 00:02 KC – Matt Kohn 8 yd run (Peter Martinez kick) – 92–52 GR
- Officials: Referee: Dave Lambros; Umpire: Doug Wilson; Linesman: Kelly Saalfeld; Line judge: Brian Matthew; Back judge: Rich Wilborn
- Offensive Player of the Game: James Macpherson (GR)
- Defensive Player of the Game: Ahmed Hawkins (GR)
- Ironman Player of the Game: Kenny Higgins (GR)

=== Week 5: vs. San Jose SaberCats ===
| Quarter | 1 | 2 | 3 | 4 | Total |
|---|---|---|---|---|---|
| SJ | 14 | 10 | 14 | 6 | 44 |
| KC | 7 | 14 | 7 | 8 | 36 |

at Sprint Center, Kansas City, Missouri

- Date: March 29
- Game time: 6:30 PM EST
- Game attendance: 13,146

Game information

1st Quarter:

- 12:36 KC – John Fitzgerald 3 yd run (Peter Martinez kick) – 7–0 KC
- 08:31 SJ – Brian Johnson 2 yd run (A.J. Haglund kick) – 7–7
- 00:10 SJ – Brian Johnson 1 yd run (A.J. Haglund kick) – 14–7 SJ

2nd Quarter:

- 12:29 KC – Dawan Moss 13 yd pass from John Fitzgerald (Peter Martinez kick) – 14–14
- 08:55 SJ – Brian Johnson 1 yd run (A.J. Haglund kick) – 21–14 SJ
- 07:44 KC – John Fitzgerald 1 yd run (Peter Martinez kick) – 21–21
- 00:00 SJ – A.J. Haglund 21 yd field goal – 24–21 SJ

3rd Quarter:

- 12:41 KC – Charles Frederick 14 yd pass from John Fitzgerald (Peter Martinez kick) – 28–24 KC
- 09:39 SJ – Jason Geathers 10 yd pass from Mark Grieb (A.J. Haglund kick) – 31–28 SJ
- 01:33 SJ – Rodney Wright 9 yd run (A.J. Haglund kick) – 38–28 SJ

4th Quarter:

- 12:50 SJ – A.J. Haglund 30 yd field goal – 41–28 SJ
- 04:55 SJ – A.J. Haglund 35 yd field goal – 44–28 SJ
- 03:25 KC – Charles Frederick 30 yd pass from John Fitzgerald (Jerel Myers pass from FITZGERALD) – 44–36 SJ
- Officials: Referee: Tom McCabe; Umpire: Rick Podraza; Linesman: Rod Pearson; Line judge: Dana McKenzie; Back judge: Scott Helverson
- Offensive Player of the Game: Rodney Wright (SJ)
- Defensive Player of the Game: Will Holder (SJ)
- Ironman Player of the Game: A.J. Haglund (SJ)

=== Week 6: at Georgia Force ===
| Quarter | 1 | 2 | 3 | 4 | Total |
|---|---|---|---|---|---|
| KC | 21 | 14 | 7 | 21 | 63 |
| GA | 7 | 21 | 21 | 21 | 70 |

at The Arena at Gwinnett Center, Duluth, Georgia

- Date: April 4
- Game time: 7:30 PM EST
- Game attendance: 10,052

Game information

1st Quarter:

- 13:55 KC – MYERS 22 yd pass from BRYANT (MARTINEZ kick) – 7–0 KC
- 12:13 KC – BROWN 5 yd interception return (MARTINEZ kick) – 14–0 KC
- 07:41 KC – FREDERICK 2 yd pass from BRYANT (MARTINEZ kick) – 21–0 KC
- 03:28 GA – JONES, Tiger 5 yd pass from GREISEN, Chris (MARTINEZ, Carlo kick) – 21–7 KC

2nd Quarter:

- 14:22 KC – BRYANT 1 yd run (MARTINEZ kick) – 28–7 KC
- 11:22 GA – MORRIS, Carl 21 yd pass from GREISEN, Chris (MARTINEZ, Carlo kick) – 28–14 KC
- 07:48 KC – HORACEK 10 yd pass from BRYANT (MARTINEZ kick) – 35–14 KC
- 06:56 GA – JONES, Tiger 30 yd pass from GREISEN, Chris (MARTINEZ, Carlo kick) – 35–21 KC
- 00:06 GA – GROCE, Damien 1 yd run (MARTINEZ, Carlo kick) – 35–28 KC

3rd Quarter:

- 13:52 GA – MORRIS, Carl 47 yd pass from GREISEN, Chris (MARTINEZ, Carlo kick) – 35–35
- 10:09 GA – NEWTON, Cam 45 yd interception return (MARTINEZ, Carlo kick) – 42–35 GA
- 03:52 KC – MOSS 3 yd run (MARTINEZ kick) – 42–42
- 02:08 GA – MORRIS, Carl 7 yd pass from GREISEN, Chris (MARTINEZ, Carlo kick) – 49–42 GA

4th Quarter:

- 14:49 KC – MYERS 36 yd pass from BRYANT (MARTINEZ kick) – 49–49
- 12:12 GA – MORRIS, Carl 28 yd pass from GREISEN, Chris (MARTINEZ, Carlo kick) – 56–49 GA
- 07:52 KC – MYERS 10 yd pass from BRYANT (MARTINEZ kick) – 56–56
- 05:05 GA – JONES, Tiger 5 yd pass from GREISEN, Chris (MARTINEZ, Carlo kick) – 63–56 GA
- 03:35 GA – NEWTON, Cam 14 yd interception return (MARTINEZ, Carlo kick) – 70–56 GA
- 00:55 KC – MYERS 3 yd pass from BRYANT (MARTINEZ kick) – 70–63 GA
- Officials: Referee: Bill LeMonnier; Umpire: Mike Delany; Linesman: Shawn Hochuli; Line judge: Dirk Bell; Back judge: Billy Beckett
- Offensive Player of the Game: Carl Morris (GA)
- Defensive Player of the Game: Cam Newton (GA)
- Ironman Player of the Game: James Whitley (GA)

=== Week 7: vs. Chicago Rush ===
| Quarter | 1 | 2 | 3 | 4 | Total |
|---|---|---|---|---|---|
| CHI | 14 | 14 | 7 | 14 | 49 |
| KC | 0 | 21 | 7 | 14 | 42 |

at Sprint Center, Kansas City, Missouri

- Date: April 14
- Game time: 8:30 PM EST
- Game attendance: 13,184

Game information

1st Quarter:

- 07:46 CHI – Travis LaTendresse 5 yd pass from Russ Michna (Dan Frantz kick) – 7–0 CHI
- 03:47 CHI – Damian Harrell 19 yd pass from Russ Michna (Dan Frantz kick) – 14–0 CHI

2nd Quarter:

- 14:18 KC – Charles Frederick 13 yd pass from D. Bryant (Peter Martinez kick) – 14–7 CHI
- 10:18 CHI – Donovan Morgan 3 yd pass from Russ Michna (Dan Frantz kick) – 21–7 CHI
- 07:05 KC – Mike Horacek 11 yd pass from D. Bryant (Peter Martinez kick) – 21–14 CHI
- 03:21 CHI – Russ Michna 1 yd run (Dan Frantz kick) – 28–14 CHI
- 00:49 KC – Mike Horacek 36 yd pass from D. Bryant (Peter Martinez kick) – 28–21 CHI

3rd Quarter:

- 09:11 KC – Charles Frederick 5 yd run (Peter Martinez kick) – 28–28
- 06:40 CHI – DeJuan Alfonzo 2 yd run (Dan Frantz kick) – 35–28 CHI

4th Quarter:

- 14:19 CHI – Dan Alexander 1 yd run (Dan Frantz kick) – 42–28 CHI
- 11:58 KC – Jerel Myers 9 yd pass from D. Bryant (Peter Martinez kick) – 42–35 CHI
- 03:17 KC – Dawan Moss 8 yd run (Peter Martinez kick) – 42–42
- 00:06 CHI – Travis LaTendresse 15 yd pass from Russ Michna (Dan Frantz kick) – 49–42 CHI
- Officials: Referee: Bill Athan; Umpire: Wes Fritz; Linesman: Neil Brunner; Line judge: Paul Engelberts; Back judge: Tony Lombardo
- Offensive Player of the Game: N/A
- Defensive Player of the Game: N/A
- Ironman Player of the Game: N/A

=== Week 8: vs. Colorado Crush ===
| Quarter | 1 | 2 | 3 | 4 | Total |
|---|---|---|---|---|---|
| COL | 19 | 6 | 16 | 12 | 53 |
| KC | 14 | 14 | 13 | 14 | 55 |

at Sprint Center, Kansas City, Missouri

- Date: April 19
- Game time: 6:00 PM EST
- Game attendance: 14,057

Game information

1st Quarter:

- 11:18 KC – Mike Horacek 23 yd pass from D. Bryant (Peter Martinez kick) – 7–0 KC
- 08:22 COL – Robert Thomas 1 yd run (Clay Rush kick) – 7–7
- 06:19 COL – Willie Quinnie 7 yd pass from John Dutton (Clay Rush kick failed) – 13–7 COL
- 05:21 KC – Will Holder 54 yd kickoff return (Peter Martinez kick) – 14–13 KC
- 02:23 COL – Chad Owens 2 yd run (John Dutton rush fumbld) – 19–14 COL

2nd Quarter:

- 13:51 KC – Charles Frederick 12 yd pass from D. Bryant (Peter Martinez kick) – 21–19 KC
- 09:33 KC – Jerel Myers 19 yd pass from D. Bryant (Peter Martinez kick) – 28–19 KC
- 06:30 COL – Ben Nelson 12 yd pass from John Dutton (John Dutton pass failed) – 28–25 KC

3rd Quarter:

- 10:36 COL – Chad Owens 2 yd run (Ben Nelson pass from DUTTON) – 33–28 COL
- 07:47 KC – Dawan Moss 11 yd run (Peter Martinez kick failed) – 34–33 KC
- 04:17 COL – Ben Nelson 6 yd pass from John Dutton (Chris Watton pass from DUTTON) – 41–34 COL
- 00:28 KC – Mike Horacek 6 yd run (Peter Martinez kick) – 41–41

4th Quarter:

- 14:33 COL – Willie Quinnie 11 yd pass from John Dutton (John Dutton rush failed) – 47–41 COL
- 09:01 KC – D. Bryant 8 yd run (Peter Martinez kick) – 48–47 KC
- 00:42 KC – Mike Horacek 47 yd pass from D. Bryant (Peter Martinez kick) – 55–47 KC
- 00:17 COL – Brad Pyatt 17 yd pass from John Dutton (John Dutton pass failed) – 55–53 KC
- Officials: Referee: Dennis Lipski; Umpire: Rick Nelson; Linesman: Brent Durbin; Line judge: Darrel Leftwich; Back judge: Reggie Smith
- Offensive Player of the Game: Mike Horacek (KC)
- Defensive Player of the Game: Robb Butler (KC)
- Ironman Player of the Game: Will Holder (KC)

=== Week 9: at Grand Rapids Rampage ===
| Quarter | 1 | 2 | 3 | 4 | Total |
|---|---|---|---|---|---|
| KC | 7 | 10 | 14 | 7 | 38 |
| GR | 20 | 21 | 14 | 17 | 72 |

at Van Andel Arena, Grand Rapids, Michigan

- Date: April 25
- Game time: 7:00 PM EST
- Game attendance: 8,102

Game information

1st Quarter:

- 14:04 GR – HIGGINS 1 yd run (GOWINS kick failed) – 6–0 GR
- 06:42 GR – JOHNSON 16 yd run (GOWINS kick) – 13–0 GR
- 03:30 KC – MOSS 4 yd run (MARTINEZ kick) – 13–7 GR
- 02:10 GR – JOHNSON 40 yd pass from MACPHERSON (GOWINS kick) – 20–7 GR

2nd Quarter:

- 09:14 KC – MARTINEZ 18 yd field goal – 20–10 GR
- 03:20 GR – HIGGINS 2 yd pass from MACPHERSON (GOWINS kick) – 27–10 GR
- 02:06 KC – BRYANT 20 yd run (MARTINEZ kick) – 27–17 GR
- 00:54 GR – MAGNER 11 yd pass from MACPHERSON (GOWINS kick) – 34–17 GR
- 00:15 GR – STEITZ 17 yd pass from MACPHERSON (GOWINS kick) – 41–17 GR

3rd Quarter:

- 12:43 GR – MAGNER 9 yd pass from MACPHERSON (GOWINS kick) – 48–17 GR
- 10:29 KC – HORACEK 19 yd pass from BRYANT (MARTINEZ kick) – 48–24 GR
- 04:06 GR – MAGNER 13 yd pass from MACPHERSON (GOWINS kick) – 55–24 GR
- 02:14 KC – MYERS 38 yd pass from BRYANT (MARTINEZ kick) – 55–31 GR

4th Quarter:

- 12:48 GR – GOWINS 19 yd field goal – 58–31 GR
- 06:59 GR – MACPHERSON 1 yd run (GOWINS kick) – 65–31 GR
- 00:47 GR – FITZGERALD 20 yd run (GOWINS kick) – 72–31 GR
- 00:30 KC – MANNING 33 yd pass from BRYANT (MARTINEZ kick) – 72–38 GR
- Officials: Referee: Tom McCabe; Umpire: Rick Podraza; Linesman: Rod Pearson; Line judge: Dana McKenzie; Back judge: Tony Lombardo
- Offensive Player of the Game: Cole Magner (GR)
- Defensive Player of the Game: Michael McFadden (GR)
- Ironman Player of the Game: Chris Martin (GR)

=== Week 10: at Utah Blaze ===
| Quarter | 1 | 2 | 3 | 4 | Total |
|---|---|---|---|---|---|
| KC | 7 | 14 | 9 | 20 | 50 |
| UTA | 13 | 20 | 13 | 21 | 67 |

at EnergySolutions Arena, Salt Lake City, Utah

- Date: May 3
- Game time: 9:00 PM EST
- Game attendance: 12,208

Game information

1st Quarter:

- 12:43 KC – Ces'are Manning 17 yd pass from D. Bryant (Peter Martinez kick) – 7–0 KC
- 11:16 UTA – Huey Whittaker 8 yd pass from Joe Germaine (Steve Azar kick failed) – 7–6 KC
- 05:52 UTA – JJ McKelvey 27 yd pass from Joe Germaine (Steve Azar kick) – 13–7 UTA

2nd Quarter:

- 14:12 UTA – Huey Whittaker 2 yd pass from Joe Germaine (Steve Azar kick) – 20–7 UTA
- 08:45 KC – Jerel Myers 5 yd pass from D. Bryant (Peter Martinez kick) – 20–14 UTA
- 04:34 UTA – Aaron Boone 29 yd pass from Joe Germaine (Steve Azar kick) – 27–14 UTA
- 00:32 KC – D. Bryant 1 yd run (Peter Martinez kick) – 27–21 UTA
- 00:04 UTA – Huey Whittaker 5 yd pass from Joe Germaine (Steve Azar kick failed) – 33–21 UTA

3rd Quarter:

- 12:43 KC – Jerel Myers 31 yd pass from D. Bryant (Peter Martinez kick failed) – 33–27 UTA
- 09:33 UTA – Kautai Olevao 1 yd run (Jason Gesser pass failed) – 39–27 UTA
- 05:15 KC – Peter Martinez 58 yd field goal – 39–30 UTA
- 02:38 UTA – Joe Germaine 9 yd run (Steve Azar kick) – 46–30 UTA

4th Quarter:

- 11:49 KC – D. Bryant 3 yd run (Peter Martinez kick) – 46–37 UTA
- 10:13 UTA – Huey Whittaker 25 yd pass from Joe Germaine (Steve Azar kick) – 53–37 UTA
- 07:30 KC – Mike Horacek 13 yd pass from D. Bryant (Peter Martinez kick) – 53–44 UTA
- 06:33 UTA – JJ McKelvey 20 yd pass from Joe Germaine (Steve Azar kick) – 60–44 UTA
- 03:51 KC – Ces'are Manning 3 yd pass from D. Bryant (D. Bryant pass intcpt) – 60–50 UTA
- 01:30 UTA – Rodney Filer 15 yd pass from Joe Germaine (Steve Azar kick) – 67–50 UTA
- Officials: Referee: Perry Havener; Umpire: Tom Laverty; Linesman: Allen Baynes; Line judge: David Meslow; Back judge: Keith Washington
- Offensive Player of the Game: Joe Germaine (UTA)
- Defensive Player of the Game: Kelvin Morris (UTA)
- Ironman Player of the Game: J'Sharlon Jones (UTA)

=== Week 11: vs. Columbus Destroyers ===
| Quarter | 1 | 2 | 3 | 4 | Total |
|---|---|---|---|---|---|
| CLB | 7 | 14 | 7 | 15 | 43 |
| KC | 14 | 14 | 14 | 17 | 59 |

at Sprint Center, Kansas City, Missouri

- Date: May 10
- Game time: 6:00 PM EST
- Game attendance: 12,736

Game information

1st Quarter:

- 12:58 KC – Ces'are Manning 22 yd pass from D. Bryant (Peter Martinez kick) – 7–0 KC
- 07:44 CLB – Harold Wells 2 yd run (Mark Lewis kick) – 7–7
- 03:17 KC – Mike Horacek 17 yd pass from D. Bryant (Peter Martinez kick) – 14–7 KC

2nd Quarter:

- 13:36 CLB – C.J. Johnson 17 yd pass from Matt Nagy (Mark Lewis kick) – 14–14
- 08:07 KC – D. Bryant 1 yd run (Peter Martinez kick) – 21–14 KC
- 05:12 CLB – C.J. Johnson 45 yd pass from Matt Nagy (Mark Lewis kick) – 21–21
- 00:02 KC – Jamarr Ward 4 yd pass from D. Bryant (Peter Martinez kick) – 28–21 KC

3rd Quarter:

- 11:19 KC – Dawan Moss 5 yd run (Peter Martinez kick) – 35–21 KC
- 09:22 CLB – Calvin Russell 46 yd pass from Matt Nagy (Mark Lewis kick) – 35–28 KC
- 08:24 KC – Jerel Myers 56 yd kickoff return (Peter Martinez kick) – 42–28 KC

4th Quarter:

- 14:56 KC – Jerel Myers 12 yd pass from D. Bryant (Peter Martinez kick) – 49–28 KC
- 08:47 KC – Dawan Moss 3 yd run (Peter Martinez kick) – 56–28 KC
- 05:07 CLB – Derek Lee 18 yd pass from Matt Nagy (Mark Lewis kick) – 56–35 KC
- 02:41 KC – Peter Martinez 22 yd field goal – 59–35 KC
- 00:53 CLB – Derek Lee 8 yd pass from Matt Nagy (Matt Nagy rush) – 59–43 KC
- Officials: Referee: Riley Johnson; Umpire: Rick Lowe; Linesman: Julian Mapp; Line judge: RG Detillier; Back judge: Bud McCleskey
- Offensive Player of the Game: Duke Bryant (KC)
- Defensive Player of the Game: Gillis Wilson (KC)
- Ironman Player of the Game: Jerel Myers (KC)

=== Week 12: vs. Orlando Predators ===
| Quarter | 1 | 2 | 3 | 4 | Total |
|---|---|---|---|---|---|
| ORL | 14 | 21 | 9 | 14 | 58 |
| KC | 14 | 17 | 13 | 7 | 51 |

at Sprint Center, Kansas City, Missouri

- Date: May 18
- Game time: 2:00 PM EST
- Game attendance: 10,992

Game information

1st Quarter:

- 12:39 ORL – Shane Stafford 9 yd run (Todd France kick) – 7–0 ORL
- 11:17 KC – Jerel Myers 37 yd pass from D. Bryant (Peter Martinez kick) – 7–7
- 05:27 ORL – Kevin Nickerson 3 yd run (Todd France kick) – 14–7 ORL
- 00:58 KC – D. Bryant 4 yd run (Peter Martinez kick) – 14–14

2nd Quarter:

- 14:57 KC – D. Bryant 3 yd run (Peter Martinez kick) – 21–14 KC
- 09:42 ORL – Odie Armstrong 4 yd pass from Shane Stafford (Todd France kick) – 21–21
- 02:35 KC – D. Bryant 1 yd run (Peter Martinez kick) – 28–21 KC
- 00:28 KC – Peter Martinez 25 yd field goal – 31–21 KC
- 00:12 ORL – T.T. Toliver 4 yd pass from Shane Stafford (Todd France kick) – 31–28 KC
- 00:00 ORL – B.J. Cohen 0 yd fumble recovery (Todd France kick) – 35–31 ORL

3rd Quarter:

- 14:48 KC – Jerel Myers 54 yd kickoff return (Peter Martinez kick failed) – 37–35 KC
- 10:53 ORL – TEAM safety – 37–37
- 09:40 ORL – Levon Thomas 48 yd pass from Shane Stafford (Todd France kick) – 44–37 ORL
- 03:38 KC – D. Bryant 6 yd run (Peter Martinez kick) – 44–44

4th Quarter:

- 04:36 ORL – T.T. Toliver 22 yd pass from Shane Stafford (Todd France kick) – 51–44 ORL
- 00:43 KC – D. Bryant 16 yd run (Peter Martinez kick) – 51–51
- 00:04 ORL – Ron Johnson 6 yd pass from Shane Stafford (Todd France kick) – 58–51 ORL
- Officials: Referee: Tom McCabe; Umpire: Rick Podraza; Linesman: Rod Pearson; Line judge: Dana McKenzie; Back judge: Scott Helverson
- Offensive Player of the Game: Shane Stafford (ORL)
- Defensive Player of the Game: B.J. Cohen (ORL)
- Ironman Player of the Game: Jerel Myers (ORL)

=== Week 13: at Philadelphia Soul ===
| Quarter | 1 | 2 | 3 | 4 | Total |
|---|---|---|---|---|---|
| KC | 20 | 13 | 7 | 14 | 54 |
| PHI | 14 | 6 | 14 | 13 | 47 |

at Wachovia Center, Philadelphia, Pennsylvania

- Date: May 22
- Game time: 7:30 PM EST
- Game attendance: 14,473

Game information

1st Quarter:

- 11:38 KC – WARD 0 yd fumble recovery (MARTINEZ kick) – 7–0 KC
- 10:12 KC – SMALLS 0 yd fumble recovery (MARTINEZ kick) – 14–0 KC
- 08:25 PHI – JACKSON 26 yd pass from D'ORAZIO (HUGHES kick) – 14–7 KC
- 03:56 KC – FREDERICK 29 yd pass from BRYANT (MARTINEZ kick failed) – 20–7 KC
- 00:56 PHI – HOLMES 27 yd pass from D'ORAZIO (HUGHES kick) – 20–14 KC

2nd Quarter:

- 10:46 KC – MANNING 8 yd pass from BRYANT (MARTINEZ kick) – 27–14 KC
- 07:32 PHI – BOGLE 3 yd pass from D'ORAZIO (HUGHES kick failed) – 27–20 KC
- 03:36 KC – FREDERICK 4 yd run (MARTINEZ kick failed) – 33–20 KC

3rd Quarter:

- 11:14 PHI – HOLMES 1 yd pass from D'ORAZIO (HUGHES kick) – 33–27 KC
- 06:04 PHI – JACKSON 12 yd pass from D'ORAZIO (HUGHES kick) – 34–33 PHI
- 00:54 KC – MOSS 2 yd run (MARTINEZ kick) – 40–33 KC

4th Quarter:

- 10:59 PHI – SMITH 1 yd run (HUGHES kick) – 41–40 PHI
- 08:35 KC – FREDERICK 15 yd pass from BRYANT (MARTINEZ kick blocked) – 46–41 KC
- 04:12 PHI – JACKSON 8 yd pass from D'ORAZIO (D'ORAZIO pass failed) – 47–46 PHI
- 01:21 KC – MYERS 8 yd pass from BRYANT (WARD pass from BRYANT) – 54–47 KC
- Officials: Referee: Pat Garvey; Umpire: Paul King; Linesman: Bill Ward; Line judge: Bob McElwee; Back judge: James Debell
- Offensive Player of the Game: Chris Jackson (PHI)
- Defensive Player of the Game: Clifton Smith (PHI)
- Ironman Player of the Game: Rob Keefe (PHI)

=== Week 14: at Chicago Rush ===
| Quarter | 1 | 2 | 3 | 4 | Total |
|---|---|---|---|---|---|
| KC | 20 | 14 | 0 | 13 | 47 |
| CHI | 14 | 14 | 7 | 17 | 52 |

at Allstate Arena, Rosemont, Illinois

- Date: May 31
- Game time: 8:00 PM EST
- Game attendance: 16,164

Game information

1st Quarter:

- 12:33 KC – Charles Frederick 23 yd pass from D. Bryant (Peter Martinez kick failed) – 6–0 KC
- 08:15 CHI – Damian Harrell 11 yd pass from Russ Michna (Dan Frantz kick) – 7–6 CHI
- 06:57 KC – Dawan Moss 30 yd run (Peter Martinez kick) – 13–7 KC
- 04:11 CHI – Travis LaTendresse 1 yd run (Dan Frantz kick) – 14–13 CHI
- 00:24 KC – Ces'are Manning 8 yd pass from D. Bryant (Peter Martinez kick) 20–14 KC

2nd Quarter:

- 13:10 CHI – Damian Harrell 5 yd pass from Russ Michna (Dan Frantz kick) – 21–20 CHI
- 06:22 KC – D. Bryant 1 yd run (Peter Martinez kick) – 27–21 KC
- 02:15 KC – Jerel Myers 1 yd pass from D. Bryant (Peter Martinez kick) – 34–21 KC
- 00:03 CHI – Donovan Morgan 3 yd pass from Russ Michna (Dan Frantz kick) – 34–28 KC

3rd Quarter:

- 01:23 CHI – Travis LaTendresse 30 yd pass from Russ Michna (Dan Frantz kick) – 35–34 CHI

4th Quarter:

- 13:35 KC – Jamarr Ward 7 yd pass from D. Bryant (Peter Martinez kick) – 41–35 – 41–35 KC
- 09:21 KC – Chris Demaree 42 yd interception return (Peter Martinez kick blocked) – 47–35 KC
- 06:15 CHI – Donovan Morgan 5 yd pass from Russ Michna (Dan Frantz kick) – 47–42 KC
- 00:11 CHI – Russ Michna 1 yd run (Travis LaTendresse pass from MICHNA) – 50–47 CHI
- 00:04 CHI – TEAM safety – 52–47 CHI
- Officials: Referee: Dave Lambros; Umpire: Paul Frerking; Linesman: Kelly Saalfeld; Line judge: Brian Matthew; Back judge: Rich Wilborn
- Offensive Player of the Game: Russ Michna (CHI)
- Defensive Player of the Game: Dennison Robinson (CHI)
- Ironman Player of the Game: N/A

=== Week 15: vs. Arizona Rattlers ===
| Quarter | 1 | 2 | 3 | 4 | Total |
|---|---|---|---|---|---|
| ARZ | 13 | 36 | 14 | 10 | 73 |
| KC | 14 | 6 | 0 | 14 | 34 |

at Sprint Center, Kansas City, Missouri

- Date: June 8
- Game time: 2:00 PM EST
- Game attendance: 12,210

Game information

1st Quarter:

- 10:56 ARZ – HARVEY 7 yd pass from SAUK (HOULE kick failed) – 6–0 ARZ
- 06:36 KC – HORACEK 26 yd pass from Q. CARTER (MARTINEZ kick) – 7–6 KC
- 02:43 ARZ – BURLEY 11 yd pass from SAUK (HOULE kick) – 13–7 ARZ
- 00:13 KC – MYERS 12 yd pass from Q. CARTER (MARTINEZ kick) – 14–13 KC

2nd Quarter:

- 12:32 ARZ – HARVEY 15 yd pass from SAUK (ROBINSON rush) – 21–14 ARZ
- 07:42 ARZ – HARVEY 33 yd pass from SAUK (HOULE kick failed) – 27–14 ARZ
- 06:31 ARZ – JOSEPH 15 yd interception return (HOULE kick) – 34–14 ARZ
- 02:57 KC – MANNING 28 yd pass from Q. CARTER (MARTINEZ kick failed) – 34–20 ARZ
- 00:56 ARZ – INGRAM 2 yd run (HOULE kick) – 41–20 ARZ
- 00:06 ARZ – GAINES 2 yd pass from SAUK (ROBINSON rush) – 49–20 ARZ

3rd Quarter:

- 10:37 ARZ – BURLEY 4 yd pass from SAUK (HOULE kick) – 56–20 ARZ
- 03:22 ARZ – BURLEY 13 yd pass from SAUK (HOULE kick) – 63–20 ARZ

4th Quarter:

- 09:11 KC – MANNING 9 yd pass from Q. CARTER (FREDERICK pass from Q. CARTER) – 63–28 ARZ
- 08:07 ARZ – MCKENZIE 10 yd kickoff return (HOULE kick) – 70–28 ARZ
- 01:42 ARZ – HOULE 34 yd field goal – 73–28 ARZ
- 00:21 KC – MOSS 1 yd run (Q. CARTER pass failed) – 73–34 ARZ
- Officials: Referee: Bill Athan; Umpire: Paul Frerking; Linesman: Kavin McGrath; Line judge: Rusty Baynes; Back judge: Greg Wilson
- Offensive Player of the Game: Siaha Burley (ARZ)
- Defensive Player of the Game: Isaiah Trufant (ARZ)
- Ironman Player of the Game: Chris McKenzie (ARZ)

=== Week 16: at Los Angeles Avengers ===
| Quarter | 1 | 2 | 3 | 4 | Total |
|---|---|---|---|---|---|
| KC | 7 | 24 | 7 | 10 | 48 |
| LA | 10 | 10 | 14 | 17 | 51 |

at Staples Center, Los Angeles, California

- Date: June 14
- Game time: 6:30 PM EST
- Game attendance: 11,282

Game information

1st Quarter:

- 09:58 LA – Kevin Ingram 6 yd pass from Sonny Cumbie (Tyler Fredrickson kick) – 7–0 LA
- 08:18 KC – Quincy Carter 1 yd run (Peter Martinez kick) – 7–7
- 03:34 LA – Tyler Fredrickson 39 yd field goal – 10–7 LA

2nd Quarter:

- 14:56 KC – Charles Frederick 14 yd pass from Quincy Carter (Peter Martinez kick) – 14–10 KC
- 12:44 LA – LaShaun Ward 7 yd pass from Sonny Cumbie (Tyler Fredrickson kick) – 17–14 LA
- 07:34 KC – Dawan Moss 4 yd run (Peter Martinez kick) – 21–17 KC
- 00:57 KC – Peter Martinez 26 yd field goal – 24–17 KC
- 00:28 LA – Tyler Fredrickson 33 yd field goal – 24–20 KC
- 00:10 KC – Jerel Myers 23 yd pass from Quincy Carter (Peter Martinez kick) – 31–20 KC

3rd Quarter:

- 09:09 LA – Timon Marshall 27 yd pass from Sonny Cumbie (Tyler Fredrickson kick) – 31–27 KC
- 04:50 KC – Mike Horacek 28 yd pass from Quincy Carter (Peter Martinez kick) – 38–27 KC
- 01:30 LA – LaShaun Ward 3 yd run (Tyler Fredrickson kick) – 38–34 KC

4th Quarter:

- 14:08 LA – Brandon Perkins safety – 38–36 KC
- 12:59 LA – Kevin Ingram 15 yd pass from Sonny Cumbie (Tyler Fredrickson kick) – 43–38 LA
- 09:56 KC – Peter Martinez 26 yd field goal – 43–41 LA
- 07:01 KC – Mike Horacek 14 yd pass from Quincy Carter (Peter Martinez kick) – 48–23 LA
- 00:34 LA – Timon Marshall 3 yd run (Kevin Ingram pass from CUMBIE, Sonny) – 51–48 LA
- Officials: Referee: Dennis Lipski; Umpire: Rick Nelson; Linesman: Brent Durbin; Line judge: Derrel Leftwich; Back judge: Reggie Smith
- Offensive Player of the Game: Timon Marshall (LA)
- Defensive Player of the Game: Brandon Perkins (LA)
- Ironman Player of the Game: Kevin Ingram (LA)

=== Week 17: at Colorado Crush ===
| Quarter | 1 | 2 | 3 | 4 | Total |
|---|---|---|---|---|---|
| KC | 0 | 14 | 0 | 13 | 27 |
| COL | 14 | 16 | 7 | 14 | 51 |

at Pepsi Center, Denver, Colorado

- Date: June 21
- Game time: 8:00 PM EST
- Game attendance: 13,571

Game information

1st Quarter:

- 06:44 COL – Willie Quinnie 7 yd pass from John Dutton (Deric Yaussi kick) – 7–0 COL
- 02:51 COL – Robert Thomas 1 yd run (Deric Yaussi kick) – 14–0 COL

2nd Quarter:

- 07:03 COL – Jason Harmon 2 yd run (Deric Yaussi kick) – 21–0 COL
- 05:48 KC – Mike Horacek 47 yd pass from D. Bryant (Peter Martinez kick) – 21–7 COL
- 00:55 COL – John Dutton 1 yd run (Deric Yaussi kick failed) – 27–7 COL
- 00:39 KC – Charles Frederick 38 yd pass from D. Bryant (Peter Martinez kick) – 27–14 COL
- 00:00 COL – Deric Yaussi 26 yd field goal – 30–14 COL

3rd Quarter:

- 13:42 COL – Ben Nelson 10 yd pass from John Dutton (Deric Yaussi kick) – 37–14 COL

4th Quarter:

- 08:56 COL – Robert Thomas 3 yd run (Deric Yaussi kick) – 44–14 COL
- 04:50 KC – Jerel Myers 5 yd pass from D. Bryant (Peter Martinez kick) – 44–21 COL
- 02:22 COL – Chris Watton 18 yd pass from John Dutton (Deric Yaussi kick) – 51–21 COL
- 00:33 KC – Gillis Wilson 5 yd pass from D. Bryant (D. Bryant pass failed) – 51–27 COL
- Officials: Referee: Pat Garvey; Umpire: Paul King; Linesman: Bill Ward; Line judge: Bob McElwee; Back judge: James DeBell
- Offensive Player of the Game: N/A
- Defensive Player of the Game: N/A
- Ironman Player of the Game: N/A
