= Ed Ta'amu =

American football player (born 1979)

No. 75
- Position: Offensive lineman

Personal information
- Born: November 8, 1979 (age 46); Honolulu, Hawaii, U.S.
- Listed height: 6 ft 1 in (1.85 m)
- Listed weight: 380 lb (172 kg)

Career information
- High school: ʻIolani (Honolulu)
- College: Utah
- NFL draft: 2002: 4th round, 132nd overall pick

Career history
- Minnesota Vikings (2002)*; Houston Texans (2003)*; Utah Blaze (2006)*; Spokane Shock (2006); Kansas City Brigade (2007–2008); Spokane Shock (2010); Utah Blaze (2011–2012); Los Angeles KISS (2015); Portland Thunder (2015)
- * Offseason or practice squad member only

Awards and highlights
- ArenaBowl champion (2010); First-team All-Arena (2010); 2× All-Mountain West selection (2000 - 2001); 2× Las Vegas Bowl champion (1999, 2001)
- Stats at ArenaFan.com

Ed Ta'amu (born November 8, 1979) is an American former professional football offensive lineman. He was selected by the Minnesota Vikings in the fourth round of the 2002 NFL draft. He played college football at Utah.

Ta'amu was also a member of the Houston Texans, Spokane Shock, Kansas City Brigade, Utah Blaze, Los Angeles KISS and Portland Thunder.

As a rookie in the National Football League in 2002, he was one of 28 Samoan players in the league. As well, as of October 4, 2008, he was one of 16 Polynesian players in the Arena Football League.

== Early life ==
Ta'amu attended Iolani School where he was an All-America Honorable Menchin as a senior in 1997.

== College career ==
Ta'amu attended the University of Utah, where he was a two-year starter. Ta'amu was an academic non-qualifier in 1997, meaning he did not have the grades to play football. He joined the team in 1998, as a backup defensive end, as well as backup long snapper. On the season, he recorded three tackles. In 1999, he was a backup defensive tackle, a position where he did not receive much playing time, so in turn, he was switched to offensive line. In 2000, he started all but one game.

=== Career summary ===
Ta'amu was a two-time All-Mountain West Conference selection. He recorded 123 knockdowns blocks, including a school record 25 against Brigham Young during his senior season.

Ta'amu was graded at 86.8% for blocking consistency and played in 20 of 26 games during his final two seasons. He also set new school weight room records with a 625-pound squat and 412-pound hang clean. As a senior, he also bench pressed 455 pounds. He was also selected to the All-Mountain West Conference Second-team, as well as a First-team selection by the Las Vegas Review-Journal and Collegefootballnews.com.

== Professional career ==
=== Pre-draft ===
Ta'amu received an invitation to the 2002 NFL Scouting Combine. He was rated as the sixth best guard out of 43. He was projected to be drafted in the third to fourth round of the draft.

Pre-draft measurables
Height	Weight	40-yard dash	10-yard split	20-yard split	Vertical jump	Bench press
6 ft 1 3/4 in (1.87 m)	335 lb (152 kg)	5.30 s	1.83 s	3.04 s	29 in (0.74 m)	28 reps
All values from NFL Combine

=== Minnesota Vikings ===
Ta'amu was selected in the fourth round (132nd overall) of the 2002 NFL draft by the Minnesota Vikings on April 21, and was signed on July 17. However, he suffered a knee injury and was waived by the team on September 2, 2002. The next day, he was signed to the Vikings practice squad. Then on October 16, he was placed on the practice squad's injured reserve, ending his season.

=== Houston Texans ===
He was then signed by the Houston Texans on January 8. He was later placed on the Physically Unable to Perform (PUP) list on July 25. He was then waived by the Texans on September 2, 2003.

=== Utah Blaze (first stint) ===
Ta'amu spent the next two years rehabbing his knee before being able to compete. He was signed to the practice squad of the Utah Blaze of the Arena Football League (AFL) on May 3, 2006. He was released on May 22, 2006.

=== Spokane Shock (first stint) ===
On May 25, 2006, it was reported that Ta'amu had been assigned to the Spokane Shock of the af2. He played alongside future Kansas City Brigade teammates Charles Frederick, Jerome Stevens, Chris Cook, and Neil Purvis. That season, the Shock won ArenaCup III.

=== Kansas City Brigade ===
On January 5, 2007, Ta'amu signed with the Kansas City Brigade of the AFL. As a rookie in 2007, he began the season on injured reserve. He then started the final four games of the season, including the first ever playoff game in franchise history. In 2008, he recorded three tackles. After the season, he was released by the Brigade.

=== Spokane Shock (second stint) ===
After a year of waiting, the AFL was reformed and the Shock became part of the revamped AFL. Ta'amu was assigned to the Shock during the offseason on March 12, 2010.

=== Utah Blaze (second stint) ===
Ta'amu was assigned to the Blaze on April 21, 2011. He played for the Blaze from 2011 to 2012.

=== Los Angeles Kiss ===
Ta'amu was assigned to the Los Angeles Kiss on June 5, 2015. He was placed on recallable reassignment on June 10, 2015.

=== Portland Thunder ===
Ta'amu was assigned to the Portland Thunder on August 12, 2015. He was placed on the suspended list on August 17, 2015.

== Personal life ==
In 2002, Ta'amu was one of 28 Samoan players in the National Football League, the most notable being Tiaina "Junior" Seau. As of October 4, 2008, Ta'amu was one of 16 Polynesian players in the Arena Football League.

Ta’amu's son, Alofa Tunoa (Noa) is an ice hockey player who was drafted by the Winnipeg Jets in the 2026 NHL entry draft. He was the first player of Samoan descent to be drafted into the NHL. Previously, he was selected third overall by the Edmonton Oil Kings in the 2023 WHL U.S. Priority Draft.

== See also ==
- List of Arena Football League and National Football League players
