= Cyron =

Cyron is both a given name and a surname. Notable people with the name include:

- Cyron Brown (born 1975), American football player
- Cyron Melville (born 1984) Danish actor and musician
- Ryszard Cyroń (born 1965), Polish football player
