= Kenny McEntyre =

American football player (born 1970)

No. 28
- Position: Defensive back

Personal information
- Born: December 12, 1970 (age 55); Dallas, Texas, U.S.
- Listed height: 5 ft 11 in (1.80 m)
- Listed weight: 185 lb (84 kg)

Career information
- High school: Plano Senior (Plano, Texas)
- College: Kansas State
- NFL draft: 1994: undrafted

Career history
- Indianapolis Colts (1994)*; Pittsburgh Steelers (1994)*; Miami Dolphins (1995)*; London Monarchs (1995–1997); Kansas City Chiefs (1996); Los Angeles Rams (1997)*; Frankfurt Galaxy (1998); Orlando Predators (1998–2006); Kansas City Brigade (2007); Orlando Predators (2008–2012)
- * Offseason or practice squad member only

Awards and highlights
- 2× ArenaBowl champion (1998, 2000); 3× AFL Defensive Player of the Year (2000, 2001, 2004); 7× First-team All-Arena (2000, 2001, 2002, 2003, 2004, 2005, 2010); Second-team All-Arena (2008); Orlando Predators consecutive games played streak (117); Al Lucas AFL Pulse Award (2011); Second-team All-Big Eight (1993)

Career AFL statistics
- Tackles: 729
- Interceptions: 97
- Touchdowns: 20
- Forced fumbles: 19
- Fumble recoveries: 16
- Stats at ArenaFan.com

Kenny McEntyre (born December 12, 1970), nicknamed "the Glove", is an American former professional football defensive back. He played college football at Kansas State.

McEntyre played for the Indianapolis Colts, Pittsburgh Steelers, Kansas City Chiefs of the National Football League (NFL), the Frankfurt Galaxy and London Monarchs of NFL Europa, and Kansas City Brigade.

== Early life ==
McEntyre attended Plano East Senior High School in Plano, Texas and was a letterman in football. In football, he was an All-District and an All-Metro honoree.

== College career ==
McEntyre originally attended Cloud County Community College, where he played basketball, but not football. He then signed a basketball scholarship at Kansas State. He played in 11 games for the Wildcats during the 1992–1993 basketball season. While at Kansas State, he played just two seasons of football and one of basketball. He recorded 118 career tackles with four interceptions, a forced fumble, a fumble recovery and six pass defenses. He was also the co-MVP of the 1993 Copper Bowl after Kansas State's 52–17 win over Wyoming. While at Kansas State, he majored in business.

== Professional career ==
=== National Football League / NFL Europe (1994–1998) ===
McEntryed was not selected in the 1994 NFL draft, however he attended training camps with the Indianapolis Colts and then the Pittsburgh Steelers in 1994 where he spent time on the team's practice squad and Kansas City Chiefs in 1996 and 1997.

McEntyre played for the London Monarchs of NFL Europe, from 1995 to 1997. He then went on to play for the Frankfurt Galaxy in 1998. He led the league in interceptions with five in 1996, returning one 66 yards for a touchdown. His 128 interception return yards also led league.

=== Arena Football League ===
==== Orlando Predators (1998–2006) ====
In January 1998, McEntyre signed with the Orlando Predators of the Arena Football League and was placed on the exempt list (NFL Europe). He was placed on the refused to report list in June 1998, and was activated on July 28, 1998, and played in just one regular season game, in which he recorded one tackle and one pass defensed while limiting Florida Bobcats wide receiver Bernard Holmes to just two catches for 11 yards. In just his second career game, a quarterfile playoff game against the Nashville Kats, he intercepted two passes in the end zone and knocked down two others while recording five tackles in the Predators 58–43 win. He recorded four tackles, two pass defenses and an interception in the 62–31 win in ArenaBowl XII.

In 1999, McEntyre led the league in interceptions with seven, yet was left off both the First and Second All-Arena teams. He also recorded 15 passes defensed and 62.5 tackles. He set an AFL record by returning three interceptions for touchdowns in the regular season and added a fourth in the first round win at top-seeded the Tampa Bay Storm. He led the team with six total tackles in a semifinal win over the second-seeded Iowa Barnstormers. He led the team with eight total tackles in an ArenaBowl XIII loss to the Albany Firebirds, but did record his third interception of the post-season.

In 2000, McEntyre recorded 11 interceptions and 16 passes defensed and earned First-team All-Arena and "Arena Defensive Player of the Year" honors. He also recorded 50.5 total tackles. Eight of his interceptions came in the first seven games as Orlando started out 7–0. He recorded a career-high three interceptions during a road win over the Kats in Week 6.

In 2001, McEntyre earned First-team All-Arena and Arena Football League Defensive Player of the Year honors by recording 10 interceptions, 21 passes defensed and 52 total tackles.

In 2002, McEntyre earned First-team All-Arena honors. He wasl also nominated for Defensive Player of Year for the third consecutive year (won in 2001 and 2000). He recorded 61 tackles with eight interceptions and 21 passes defensed on regular season.

In 2003, McEntyre earned First-team All-Arena honors, for the fourth consecutive year, after he scored six touchdowns during the season (including playoffs), returning three interceptions, two on-side kicks and recovering a fumble in the end zone for touchdowns. He finished the season with a team-leading 89.5 tackles, 10 interceptions, 19 passes defensed, and two fumble recoveries.

In 2004, McEntyre was named to the First-team All-Arena and "AFL Defensive Player of the Year", for a third time. He played in all 16 regular season games, recording 85.5 tackles, nine interceptions, 11 passes defensed, and a career-high four fumble recoveries.

In 2005, McEntyre played in 14 regular season games, leading the team in tackles with 57, interceptions with five and passes defenses with 13. He was named First-team All-Arena for the sixth consecutive season, tying Barry Wagner for most consecutive appearances in league history.

He recorded his 55th career interception in a Week 2 road win at Arizona Rattlers. He earned Defensive Player of Game and ADT Defensive Player of Week honors against the New Orleans VooDoo in Week 7, after recording two interceptions and two of passes defensed along with six tackles in a Predators win. He was selected as the Defensive Player of Game for second time in three weeks after recording seven tackles, two passes defensed, a forced fumble and fumble recovery against the Austin Wranglers in Week 9. He earned Defensive Player of Game, once again with four tackles as Predators shut down New Orleans potent passing attack for second time this year.

In 2006, McEntyre played in 16 games and recorded 63 tackles, 16 passes defensed, three forced fumbles, three fumble recoveries, and four interceptions. During Week 13 against the Storm, he recorded 4.5 tackles with season-high three passes defensed, he also intercepted a fourth quarter pass and returned it for a touchdown. The 15th defensive touchdown of his career.

==== Kansas City Brigade (2007) ====
On June 30, 2006, McEntyre signed with the Kansas City Brigade. In 2007, he set a career-high in assisted tackles with 37. He was named Defensive Player of the Game three times, and AFL Player of the Week after his performance in Week 1 against Chicago. He set Brigade single-season records with nine interceptions, returning three for touchdowns. He also tied his career-high in multiple interception games with three. He tied the all-time postseason interceptions record by recording his 12th during the June 30 Wild Card Playoff game. He finished the season second on the team in tackles with 59.5.

==== Orlando Predators (2008–2011) ====
In October 2007, McEntyre was traded from the Brigade back to the Predators.

In 2008, McEntyre played in all 16 regular season games, and recorded 49 tackles, 8 interceptions, 7 passes defensed, two forced fumbles, and four touchdowns. During Week 7 at the Grand Rapids Rampage he recorded the 75th interception of his career and returned it for a four-yard touchdown. Later in the season during Week 14 against the Rattlers, recorded the 80th and 81st interceptions of his career.

On July 30, 2011, McEntyre played his last game in his career. It was a 63–48 loss to the Jacksonville Sharks in the first round of the playoffs. He finish his historic career with 96 regular season interceptions and 13 post-season interceptions.

== Post-playing career ==
McEntyre initially began his coaching career on June 8, 2010, when he was named head coach of the Orlando Fantasy in the Lingerie Football League, a women's football league. However, he never coached a game for the team as he was replaced by the Predators' assistant coach Doug Miller before the 2010–11 season.

In 2019, he was a part of an ownership group that acquired the trademarks for his former AFL Predators team and relaunched the Orlando Predators in the National Arena League (NAL). During the team's first season, players claimed the team was poorly operated including failed payments and evictions from team housing. Prior to the team's second season, he was removed by the league from the ownership of the Predators.

== Personal ==
He is an avid golfer, as well as being self-taught, he regularly shoots in the mid to low 80's. He organized a golf tournament to raise funds for hurricane victims in October 2005. The efforts in the Golf for the Gulf Tournament raised nearly $10,000 for hurricane relief efforts. He also participated in a school supply collection drive for underprivileged kids, worked with his wife on a Christmas project to collect toys for kids, was a member of the AFL Army Boot Camp – which paid visits to area high schools to teach importance of education, teamwork and physical fitness, visited schools as part of Orange County Career Day and served meals to homeless at Salvation over Thanksgiving as part of an off-season full of community relations activities.

He is also married to his wife, Sharisse, and the couple reside in Orlando, Florida during the off-season.

McEntyre is nicknamed "the Glove" for his ability to tightly cover receivers.
