= Khaleed Vaughn =

American football player (born 1981)

No. 99, 98
- Position: Defensive end

Personal information
- Born: May 20, 1981 (age 45); Atlanta, Georgia, U.S.
- Listed height: 6 ft 4 in (1.93 m)
- Listed weight: 276 lb (125 kg)

Career information
- High school: South Atlanta
- College: Clemson (2000–2003)
- NFL draft: 2004: undrafted

Career history
- New York Giants (2004)*; Atlanta Falcons (2004); Carolina Panthers (2005)*; Denver Broncos (2006)*; Las Vegas Gladiators (2007); Kansas City Brigade (2008)
- * Offseason or practice squad member only
- Stats at Pro Football Reference
- Stats at ArenaFan.com

Khaleed B. Vaughn (born May 20, 1981) is an American former professional football defensive end who played for the Atlanta Falcons of the National Football League (NFL). He played college football for the Clemson Tigers.

== Early life ==
Khaleed B. Vaughn was born on May 20, 1981, in Atlanta, Georgia. He attended South Atlanta High School.

== College career ==
Vaughn enrolled at Clemson University to play college football for the Tigers. He was a four-year varsity letterman from 2000 to 2003. He was a three-year starter and finished his college career with 194 tackles, 11 sacks and one interception. Vaughn earned first-team Atlantic Coast Conference All-Academic honors in 2001 and 2002. He graduated with a degree in sports marketing.

== Professional career ==
Vaughn signed with the New York Giants on April 30, 2004. He was waived on September 5 and signed to the team's practice squad on September 7.

On October 20, 2004, Vaughn was signed to the Atlanta Falcons' active roster off of the Giants' practice squad. He played in three regular season games for the Falcons and posted three solo tackles (including one for loss). He also appeared in one playoff game. Vaughn was waived on September 3, 2005.

Vaughn was signed to the Carolina Panthers' practice squad on September 14, 2005, where he spent the entire 2005 season. He became a free agent afterwards, and signed a reserve/future contract with the Denver Broncos on January 25, 2006. He was waived on September 2, 2006.

On November 21, 2006, Vaughn signed with the Las Vegas Gladiators of the Arena Football League (AFL) for the 2007 AFL season. He played in 15 of 16 games, recording 26 solo tackles, 12 assisted tackles, 1.5 sacks, one forced fumble, one fumble recovery, and one interception.

On February 23, 2008, Vaughn was traded to the Kansas City Brigade for future considerations. He was placed on injured reserve on February 25 and activated on March 28. He posted 11 solo tackles and 12 assisted tackles for the Brigade during the 2008 season. The AFL folded after the 2008 season.
