= Raymond Philyaw =

American football player and coach (born 1974)

Profile
- Position: Quarterback

Personal information
- Born: July 30, 1974 (age 52); Shreveport, Louisiana, U.S.
- Listed height: 6 ft 0 in (1.83 m)
- Listed weight: 215 lb (98 kg)

Career information
- High school: Southwood (Shreveport)
- College: Northeast Louisiana
- NFL draft: 1997: undrafted

Career history

Playing
- Winnipeg Blue Bombers (1997); Madison Mad Dogs (1998–1999); Shreveport Knights (1999); Albany Firebirds (2000); Indiana Firebirds (2001–2003); Chicago Rush (2004–2005); Kansas City Brigade (2006–2007); Cleveland Gladiators (2008); Bossier-Shreveport Battle Wings (2010); San Jose SaberCats (2012)*
- * Offseason or practice squad member only

Coaching
- New Orleans VooDoo (2011) Offensive coordinator; San Antonio Talons (2013–2014) Offensive coordinator; Jacksonville Sharks (2016) Offensive coordinator

Awards and highlights
- ULM Hall of Fame Inductee (2009)

Career AFL statistics
- Completions: 2,230
- Attempts: 3,397
- Yards: 26,562
- Touchdowns: 507
- Interceptions: 59
- Stats at ArenaFan.com

Raymond 'Ray' Philyaw (born July 30, 1974) is an American former professional football quarterback who was most recently the offensive coordinator of the Jacksonville Sharks of the Arena Football League (AFL). He also played for the Cleveland Gladiators, Chicago Rush, Kansas City Brigade, Bossier-Shreveport Battle Wings and the Albany/Indiana Firebirds, leading the former to the American Conference championship game in 2004 and 2005. Prior to his Arena Football career, he played for the Winnipeg Blue Bombers of the Canadian Football League (CFL) and the Madison Mad Dogs of the Indoor Football League (IFL). After leaving to coach with the New Orleans VooDoo in 2011, he attempted a return as a player in 2012 with the San Jose SaberCats, but later became OC for the San Antonio Talons. He holds the record for the highest career TD-to-INT ratio in AFL history and threw a school record 52 TDs playing college football for the Northeast Louisiana Indians (now Louisiana–Monroe Warhawks).

== Early life ==
Philyaw attended Southwood High School in Caddo Parish, Louisiana. While there, he participated in football, basketball and track & field, winning a district championship his senior year in both football and basketball.

== College career ==
Philyaw attended Northeast Louisiana University (now University of Louisiana at Monroe), where he continued his football career. Philyaw started his sophomore through senior seasons for the Indians. At the completion of his career in 1996, Philyaw's 52 career touchdown passes stood as a school record until Steven Jyles broke his record in 2005. In 2009, Philyaw was inducted into the ULM Athletics Hall of Fame.

=== Statistics ===
Philyaw's college stats at the completion of the 1996 season. Source:

Year	Team	Passing							Rushing			Receiving		
Year	Team	Comp	Att	Pct	Yds	TD	INT	Rating	Att	Yds	TD	Rec	Yds	TD
1993	Northeast Louisiana	--	--	--	--	--	--	--	--	--	--	--	--	--
1994	Northeast Louisiana	131	243	53.9	1,893	13	7	131.2	64	95	2	1	25	0
1995	Northeast Louisiana	167	320	52.2	2,627	22	7	139.5	49	-43	0	0	0	0
1996	Northeast Louisiana	173	351	49.3	2,445	16	8	118.3	68	-86	3	0	0	0
Totals		471	914	51.5	6,965	52	22	129.1	181	-34	5	1	25	0

== Professional career ==
=== Shreveport Knights ===
Philyaw was backup quarterback for the Shreveport Knights of the short-lived Regional Football League in 1999.

=== Chicago Rush ===
With the Chicago Rush in 2004, Philyaw lead the Rush to the conference semi-finals, but when he suffered an ACL injury, the Rush lost momentum and fell to the San Jose SaberCats.

=== Kansas City Brigade ===
In 2006, Philyaw signed with expansion Kansas City Brigade, after the Brigade released veteran Andy Kelly.

=== Cleveland Gladiators ===
In 2008, Philyaw lead the Cleveland Gladiators to the National Conference finals. The Gladiators lost the game 35–70 to the champion Philadelphia Soul.

=== San Jose SaberCats ===
In 2012, Philyaw attempted a comeback with the San Jose SaberCats, but was put on IR.

== Coaching career ==
=== New Orleans VooDoo ===
In 2011, Philyaw was hired by the New Orleans VooDoo as the team's offensive coordinator.

=== San Antonio Talons ===
In 2013, Philyaw as hired as the San Antonio Talons' offensive coordinator. Philyaw dealt with injuries during the year, starting five different quarterbacks in the first seven weeks of the season. The Talons did not find an ownership group for the 2015 season, and the franchise was placed on suspension, leaving Philyaw jobless.
