= B. J. Cohen =

American football player and coach (born 1975)

No. 93
- Positions: Offensive lineman, defensive lineman

Personal information
- Born: June 10, 1975 (age 51); Conley, Georgia, U.S.
- Listed height: 6 ft 2 in (1.88 m)
- Listed weight: 280 lb (127 kg)

Career information
- High school: Cedar Grove (Ellenwood, Georgia)
- College: Marshall
- NFL draft: 1998: undrafted

Career history

Playing
- Orlando Predators (1999–2002); Tampa Bay Storm (2003); New Orleans VooDoo (2004–2005); Kansas City Brigade (2006–2007); Orlando Predators (2008)

Coaching
- New Orleans VooDoo (OL/DL) (2014)

Awards and highlights
- 2× ArenaBowl champion (2000, 2003); First-team All-Arena (2005); 2× Second-team All-Arena (2000, 2003); 3× AFL All-Ironman Team (2000, 2003, 2005); NCAA I-AA national champion (1996); First-team All-MAC (1997)

Career AFL statistics
- Tackles: 151
- Sacks: 38.5
- Interceptions: 6
- Pass breakups: 26
- Receptions-yards-TDs: 45-514-11
- Stats at ArenaFan.com

B. J. Cohen (born June 10, 1975) is an American former professional football offensive lineman and defensive lineman who played in the Arena Football League (AFL).

== Early life ==
Cohen was born in Conley, Georgia. He attended Cedar Grove High School in Ellenwood, Georgia, and lettered three times in football, twice in basketball, and once in baseball.

== College career ==
Cohen played college football at Marshall University, where he was a three-time All-American.

== Professional career ==
Cohen has played with the Orlando Predators (1999–2002), Tampa Bay Storm (2003), New Orleans VooDoo (2004–2005), Kansas City Brigade (2006), and returned to the Predators for a final season in 2008.

== Coaching career ==
In 2013, Cohen was named the offensive and defensive line coach for the VooDoo. In April 2022, Cohen was named as head football coach of Bonnabel High School in Kenner, LA. He was relieved of his coaching duties at Bonnabel High in 2024.
