= Isaiah Trufant =

American football player (born 1982)

No. 29, 44, 35, 36
- Position: Cornerback / Special teamer

Personal information
- Born: December 9, 1982 (age 43); Tacoma, Washington, U.S.
- Listed height: 5 ft 7 in (1.70 m)
- Listed weight: 170 lb (77 kg)

Career information
- High school: Woodrow Wilson (Tacoma)
- College: Eastern Washington
- NFL draft: 2006: undrafted

Career history
- Spokane Shock (2006); Kansas City Brigade (2007); Arizona Rattlers (2007–2009); Las Vegas Locomotives (2009–2010); New York Jets (2010); Philadelphia Eagles (2011)*; New York Jets (2011–2013); Cleveland Browns (2014)
- * Offseason or practice squad member only

Awards and highlights
- 2× UFL champion (2009, 2010); UFL Defensive Player of the Year (2010); 2× First-team All-Big Sky (2004–2005)

Career NFL statistics
- Total tackles: 32
- Pass deflections: 2
- Stats at Pro Football Reference

Career AFL statistics
- Total tackles: 107
- Interceptions: 5
- Forced fumbles: 5
- Stats at ArenaFan.com

Isaiah Jermaine Trufant (born December 9, 1982) is an American former professional football player who was a cornerback and special teamer in the National Football League (NFL) and Arena Football League (AFL). He was signed by the Spokane Shock as an undrafted free agent in 2006. He played college football for the Eastern Washington Eagles.

Trufant was also a member of the Kansas City Brigade, Arizona Rattlers, Las Vegas Locomotives, Philadelphia Eagles, New York Jets, and Cleveland Browns.

== Professional career ==
=== Spokane Shock ===
A mid-season acquisition for the Shock in 2006, who play their home games only 18 miles from his alma mater, Eastern Washington University. In the semi-finals of the af2 playoffs Trufant was named Defensive Player of the Game as the Shock defeated the Arkansas Twisters en route to winning the Arena Cup.

=== Kansas City Brigade ===
Trufant led Kansas City in pass breakups with 16, playing in only 8 games in the 2007 Arena Football League season. Also had 1 INT, 2 FF and 4 FR.

=== Arizona Rattlers ===
In 2008, Trufant led the Arizona Rattlers of the Arena Football League in tackles with 78 and interceptions with 4.

=== Las Vegas Locomotives ===
Trufant was an integral part of the Locomotives defense in 2010. Trufant recorded 30 tackles, one sack, four passes defensed and a UFL record four interceptions, one of which was returned for a touchdown. Trufant was named the UFL's Defensive Player of the Year for his efforts.

=== New York Jets (first stint) ===
Trufant was signed to the New York Jets' practice squad on December 8, 2010. Trufant was promoted to the active roster on December 30. Trufant made his NFL debut with the Jets during their final home game of the season on January 2, 2011. Trufant was waived on January 22, after the team promoted Martin Tevaseu from the practice squad.

=== Philadelphia Eagles ===
On February 1, 2011, the Philadelphia Eagles claimed Trufant off waivers. He was waived on August 30.

=== New York Jets (second stint) ===
Trufant was re-signed by the Jets on September 1, 2011. He was waived on September 4. He was signed to the practice squad on September 5, but four days later, he was promoted to the active roster. Trufant scored the first NFL touchdown of his career on September 11, after a blocked punt by Joe McKnight bounced into his hands which he ran 18 yards to score. Trufant was placed on injured reserve on November 13, 2012 after suffering a knee injury against the Seattle Seahawks on November 11.

=== Cleveland Browns ===
Trufant signed with the Cleveland Browns on March 12, 2014. He was released by the Browns on October 17.

== Personal life ==
He is the younger brother of Marcus Trufant who was formerly with the Seattle Seahawks and Jacksonville Jaguars. He is the older brother of Desmond Trufant, a cornerback drafted by the Atlanta Falcons in 2013.
