= Boo Williams =

American football player (born 1979)

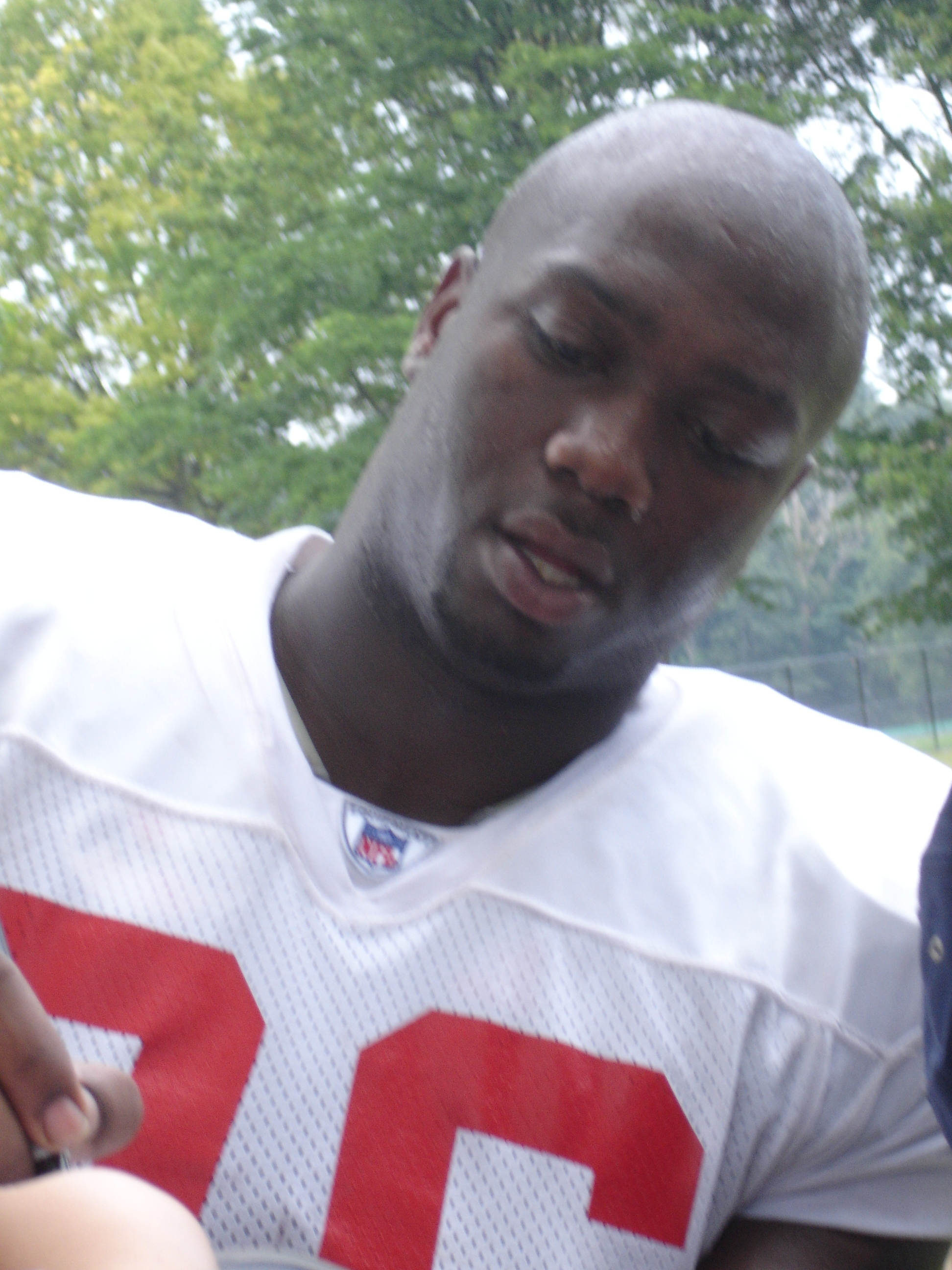
- Williams signs an autograph in 2006

No. 82
- Positions: Tight end, Wide receiver

Personal information
- Born: June 22, 1979 (age 47); Tallahassee, Florida, U.S.
- Listed height: 6 ft 4 in (1.93 m)
- Listed weight: 265 lb (120 kg)

Career information
- High school: Lincoln (Tallahassee)
- College: Arkansas (1999-2000)
- NFL draft: 2001: undrafted

Career history
- New Orleans Saints (2001–2005); New York Giants (2006)*; Kansas City Brigade (2007–2008)
- * Offseason or practice squad member only

Career NFL statistics
- Receptions: 107
- Receiving yards: 1,143
- Receiving touchdowns: 12
- Stats at Pro Football Reference

Career AFL statistics
- Receptions: 45
- Receiving yards: 473
- Receiving touchdowns: 17
- Stats at ArenaFan.com

Eddie Lee "Boo" Williams (born June 22, 1979) is an American former professional football player who was a tight end for the New Orleans Saints of the National Football League (NFL) from 2001 to 2004. He played college football for the Arkansas Razorbacks as a wide receiver.

== College career ==
Williams played two seasons at Coffeyville Community College in Kansas, where he was a two-time All-American catching 83 passes for 1,687 yards and 21 touchdowns as a split end wide receiver. He then transferred to the University of Arkansas for the 1999 and 2000 seasons where he caught 80 receptions for 1,123 yards and 11 touchdowns.

== Professional career ==
Pre-draft measurables
Height	Weight	40-yard dash	10-yard split	20-yard split	20-yard shuttle	Three-cone drill	Vertical jump	Broad jump
6 ft 4 in (1.93 m)	237 lb (108 kg)	4.72 s	1.63 s	2.73 s	4.33 s	7.10 s	35 1/2 in (0.90 m)	9 ft 11 in (3.02 m)
Measurables are from the 2001 NFL Scouting Combine.

=== New Orleans Saints ===
Williams was signed as an undrafted free agent by the New Orleans Saints on April 26, 2001 and soon began a conversion to the tight end position. Waived in September, then signed off the practice squad on October 27, he played in his first NFL game October 28 and made his first start the following week. He finished his first NFL season with 20 receptions for 202 yards and 3 touchdowns.

Williams was the top pass-catching tight end for the Saints in 2002 with 13 receptions for 143 yards and 2 touchdowns. The following year he set career highs with 41 catches for 436 yards and 5 touchdowns, leading the NFC in touchdowns among tight ends. In 2004 Williams started a career-high 8 games.

Williams tore the ACL and MCL in his right knee during a 2005 preseason game and did not play the entire year. He was released by the Saints in February 2006.

=== New York Giants ===
Williams was signed by the New York Giants in June 2006 but waived before the regular season began.

=== Kansas City Brigade ===
On January 19, 2007, Williams signed with the Kansas City Brigade of the Arena Football League. On March 3, 2008, he was placed on recallable waivers by the Brigade.

== NFL career statistics ==
Legend
**Bold**	Career high

Year	Team	Games		Receiving					
Year	Team	GP	GS	Tgt	Rec	Yds	Avg	Lng	TD
2001	NOR	11	4	42	20	202	10.1	26	3
2002	NOR	**16**	3	31	13	143	**11.0**	**32**	2
2003	NOR	**16**	6	62	**41**	**436**	10.6	31	**5**
2004	NOR	**16**	**7**	**75**	33	362	**11.0**	22	2
		59	20	210	107	1,143	10.7	32	12

== Life after football ==
Williams struggled with a multitude of depression, anger, and anxiety issues after retiring from football, the cause of which he attributes to head trauma sustained during his NFL career. After nearly taking his own life in 2011, Williams spent four months at the Crosby Center in San Diego for diagnosis and treatment of the problems he was suffering from. Williams later worked with the Crosby Center to help other NFL players dealing with similar issues post-retirement.

Williams uses cannabis to treat the chronic pain and neurological problems that have resulted from his football career. As a member of the Gridiron Cannabis Coalition he has been active in speaking about his experience using cannabis as medicine and advocating for the NFL to change its policy.

Williams founded the Boo Williams Athletic Academy, an after-school program providing academic and athletic activities for children to engage in. He has also worked as a bounty hunter and appeared in two episodes of the reality TV show Dog and Beth: On the Hunt.
