= Jerel Myers =

American football player (born 1981)

Profile
- Position: Wide receiver

Personal information
- Born: July 18, 1981 (age 45); Houston, Texas, U.S.
- Listed height: 5 ft 11 in (1.80 m)
- Listed weight: 175 lb (79 kg)

Career information
- High school: Madison (TX)
- College: LSU
- NFL draft: 2003: undrafted

Career history
- Buffalo Bills (2003–2004)*; Washington Redskins (2005)*; BC Lions (2005); New Orleans VooDoo (2005)*; Kansas City Brigade (2006–2008); BC Lions (2009)*; Oklahoma City Yard Dawgz (2010)
- * Offseason or practice squad member only

Career CFL statistics
- Receptions: 36
- Yards: 473
- Touchdowns: 2
- Stats at CFL.ca (archived)

Career AFL statistics
- Receptions: 386
- Yards: 4,066
- Touchdowns: 59
- Kick return yards: 2,052
- Kick return touchdowns: 2
- Stats at ArenaFan.com

Erasmus Jerel Myers (born July 18, 1981) is an American former professional football wide receiver. He was signed as an undrafted free agent by the Buffalo Bills in 2003. He played college football for the LSU Tigers.

Myers was also a member of the Washington Redskins, New Orleans VooDoo, Kansas City Brigade, BC Lions, and Oklahoma City Yard Dawgz.

He is now a physical education teacher at Stafford Municipal School District in Stafford, Texas.
