= Cyron Brown =

American football player (born 1975)

No. 73, 77
- Positions: Defensive end, offensive lineman

Personal information
- Born: June 28, 1975 (age 51); Chicago, Illinois, U.S.
- Listed height: 6 ft 6 in (1.98 m)
- Listed weight: 280 lb (127 kg)

Career information
- High school: Lane Tech (Chicago)
- College: Illinois, Western Illinois
- NFL draft: 1998: undrafted

Career history
- Denver Broncos (1998–2001); Colorado Crush (2003); Tampa Bay Storm (2004); Philadelphia Soul (2004–2006); Kansas City Brigade (2006-2007); Dallas Desperados (2008)

Awards and highlights
- Super Bowl champion (XXXIII)

Career NFL statistics
- Total tackles: 4
- Stats at Pro Football Reference

Career AFL statistics
- Total tackles: 64
- Sacks: 11
- Passes defended: 7
- Stats at ArenaFan.com

Cyron DeAndre Brown (born June 28, 1975) is an American former professional football player who was a defensive end in the National Football League (NFL). He played college football for the Illinois Fighting Illini and Western Illinois Leathernecks.

== Early life and college career ==
Brown played football and basketball at Albert G. Lane Tech High School in Chicago, Illinois, where he earned All-American honors in football and All-City honors in basketball. He played football at Illinois for three years until transferring to Western Illinois in 1997.

== Pro football career ==
Undrafted in 1998, Brown was a member of the Denver Broncos from 1998 to 2002, primarily as a member of the practice squad. Brown won a ring as a member of the Broncos Super Bowl XXXIII championship team in 1998.

In 1999, Brown was suspended for four games for violating the league's substance abuse policy. Brown was the first Bronco to violate the policy. The NFL reinstated Brown on June 10, 2001, and he spent the 2001 season on the practice squad. The Broncos waived Brown on August 26, 2002, prior to the regular season.

Brown played his later football career in the Arena Football League, with the Colorado Crush in 2003, Philadelphia Soul from 2004 to 2006, and Kansas City Brigade in 2007.
