= Travis Coleman =

American football player (born 1980)

No. 39, 2
- Position: Defensive back

Personal information
- Born: January 4, 1980 (age 46); Goldsboro, North Carolina, U.S.
- Listed height: 6 ft 0 in (1.83 m)
- Listed weight: 190 lb (86 kg)

Career information
- High school: Goldsboro
- College: Hampton
- NFL draft: 2002: undrafted

Career history
- Chicago Bears (2002–2003); Berlin Thunder (2003); Detroit Lions (2003)*; Indianapolis Colts (2003)*; Albany Conquest (2004–2005); Kansas City Brigade (2006–2008); Alabama Vipers (2010); Orlando Predators (2011–2013); New Orleans VooDoo (2014)
- * Offseason or practice squad member only
- Stats at Pro Football Reference
- Stats at ArenaFan.com

Travis Lee Coleman (born January 4, 1980) is an American former professional football defensive back who played in the National Football League (NFL) and Arena Football League (AFL). He played college football at Hampton University. He was a member of the Chicago Bears, Berlin Thunder, Detroit Lions, Indianapolis Colts, Albany Conquest, Kansas City Brigade, Alabama Vipers, Orlando Predators and New Orleans VooDoo.

== Early life and college ==
Coleman attended Goldsboro High School in Goldsboro, North Carolina.

Coleman earned Second-team All-Mid-Eastern Athletic Conference as a strong safety for the Hampton Pirates. He recorded 147 tackles, 13 interceptions and 48 pass breakups over his four-year career.

== Professional career ==
Coleman signed with the Chicago Bears on April 29, 2002. He was released by the Bears on September 1 and signed to the team's practice squad on September 3, 2002. He signed a three-year contract with the Bears on November 12, 2002. He was allocated to NFL Europe in February 2003, where he played for the Berlin Thunder. He was released by the Bears on June 10, 2003.

Coleman spent time with the Detroit Lions during the 2003 off-season. He was signed by the Indianapolis Colts on August 15, 2003. He was released by the Colts on August 31, 2003.

Coleman played for the Albany Conquest of the af2 from 2004 to 2005. He signed with the Kansas City Brigade of the Arena Football League (AFL) on October 15, 2005. He was signed by the Alabama Vipers of the AFL on December 17, 2009. Coleman signed with the AFL's Orlando Predators on October 7, 2010. He played for New Orleans VooDoo of the AFL in 2014 after being traded from the Predators.
