= Jerry Turner (American football) =

American football player (born 1978)

Profile
- Position: Defensive end

Personal information
- Born: April 10, 1978 (age 48)
- Listed height: 6 ft 3 in (1.91 m)
- Listed weight: 265 lb (120 kg)

Career information
- High school: Birmingham (AL) Huffman
- College: Tennessee Tech
- NFL draft: 2000: undrafted

Career history
- Alabama Steeldogs (2001–2002); Las Vegas Gladiators (2003); Alabama Steeldogs (2004); Bakersfield Blitz (2006); Kansas City Brigade (2007–2008); Arkansas Twisters (2009); Spokane Shock (2010); Georgia Force (2011–2012); Jacksonville Sharks (2013–2016); Tampa Bay Storm (2016); Monterrey Steel (2017)

Awards and highlights
- ArenaBowl champion (2010); Second-team All-Arena (2013)

Career AFL statistics
- Tackles: 183
- Sacks: 41.5
- Forced Fumbles: 19
- Fumble Recoveries: 16
- Blocked kicks: 11
- Stats at ArenaFan.com

Jerry Turner (born April 10, 1978) is an American former professional football defensive end. He was signed by the Alabama Steeldogs as an undrafted free agent in 2001. He played college football at Tennessee Technological University.

On June 9, 2016, Turner was assigned to the Tampa Bay Storm.

On May 11, 2017, Turner signed with the Monterrey Steel.
