= Cecil Moore (soccer) =

American soccer player (1926–1984)

Personal information
- Date of birth: January 2, 1926
- Place of birth: Belfast, Northern Ireland
- Date of death: March 1, 1984 (aged 58)
- Position: Goalkeeper

Senior career*
Years	Team	Apps	(Gls)
1945–1951	Glentoran	181	(0)
- New York Americans

International career
1949	Ireland	1	(0)
1953	United States	1	(0)
- * Club domestic league appearances and goals

Cecil W. Moore (January 2, 1926 – March 1, 1984) was a soccer player who played as a goalkeeper. He represented both Ireland and the United States internationally.

In 1945, Moore joined Glentoran where he played for the next six seasons. He later played for the New York Americans of the American Soccer League.

Moore played one match for Ireland, against Wales on March 9, 1949. After moving to the United States, he played in a 6–3 United States loss to England on June 8, 1953.

Moore died on March 1, 1984, at the age of 58.
