= Kevin Porter (American football) =

American football player and coach (born 1966)

Morehouse Maroon Tigers
- Title: Safeties coach & defensive pass game coordinator

Personal information
- Born: April 11, 1966 (age 60); Bronx, New York, U.S.
- Listed height: 5 ft 10 in (1.78 m)
- Listed weight: 215 lb (98 kg)

Career information
- High school: Warner Robins (Warner Robins, Georgia)
- College: Auburn
- NFL draft: 1988: 3rd round, 59th overall pick

Career history

Playing
- Kansas City Chiefs (1988–1992); New York Jets (1992–1993); London Monarchs (1995)

Coaching
- Orlando Predators (1999) Defensive backs coach; Pensacola Barracudas (2000) Head coach; Macon Knights (2001–2003) Head coach; New Orleans VooDoo (2004–2005) Defensive coordinator; Kansas City Brigade (2006–2008) Head coach; MidAmerica Nazarene (2009) Defensive coordinator; Avila (2010) Head coach; Point (2011–2012) Head coach; West Georgia (2013) Assistant head coach, secondary, special teams; Fort Valley State (2016–2019) Head coach; Central State (OH) (2022–2024) Head coach; Morehouse (2025–present) Safeties coach & defensive pass game coordinator

Awards and highlights
- First-team All-SEC (1987); Second-team All-SEC (1986)

Career NFL statistics
- Sacks: 1.5
- Interceptions: 1
- Fumble recoveries: 3
- Stats at Pro Football Reference

Head coaching record
- Career: 31–60 (.341)

Kevin James Porter (born April 11, 1966) is an American football coach and former player. He is the safeties coach and defensive pass game coordinator for Morehouse College, a position he has held since 2025. He was the head football coach for Central State University from 2022 to 2024.

Pre-draft measurables
Height	Weight	Hand span	40-yard dash	10-yard split	20-yard split	20-yard shuttle	Vertical jump	Broad jump	Bench press
5 ft 10 1/2 in (1.79 m)	211 lb (96 kg)	9 in (0.23 m)	4.56 s	1.63 s	2.72 s	4.20 s	34.5 in (0.88 m)	9 ft 11 in (3.02 m)	15 reps
All values from NFL Combine

He was drafted in the third round of the 1988 NFL Draft by the Chiefs. He played professionally as a defensive back for the Kansas City Chiefs and New York Jets in the National Football League (NFL). Porter served as the head coach for the Kansas City Brigade of the Arena Football League (AFL) from 2006 to 2008, compiling a record of 13–20, including a 0–1 mark in the postseason. In 2010, he was the head football coach at Avila University. For the fall of 2011, Porter became the athletic director and football coach at Georgia's Point University. He was the head football coach at Fort Valley State University in Fort Valley, Georgia from 2016 to 2019.

== Head coaching record ==
=== College ===
Year	Team	Overall	Conference	Standing	Bowl/playoffs
Avila Eagles (Heart of America Athletic Conference) (2010)
2010	Avila	2–8	2–8	9th	
Avila:		2–8	2–8		
Point Skyhawks (NAIA independent) (2012)
2012	Point	2–8			
Point:		2–8			
Fort Valley State Wildcats (Southern Intercollegiate Athletic Conference) (2016–2019)
2016	Fort Valley State	5–6	4–3	1st (East)	
2017	Fort Valley State	5–5	5–1	1st (East)	
2018	Fort Valley State	2–8	2–4	T–4th (East)	
2019	Fort Valley State	6–4	4–2	3rd (East)	
Fort Valley State:		18–23	15–10		
Central State Marauders (Southern Intercollegiate Athletic Conference) (2022–2024)
2022	Central State	3–7	2–5	4th (West)	
2023	Central State	5–5	4–4	8th	
2024	Central State	1–9	1–7	T–11th	
Central State:		9–21	7–16		
Total:		31–60			
National championship Conference title Conference division title or championship game berth
