= Charles Frederick (American football) =

American football player (born 1982)

No. 18
- Position: Defensive back / Wide receiver

Personal information
- Born: February 2, 1982 (age 44); Lake Worth Beach, Florida, U.S.
- Listed height: 5 ft 11 in (1.80 m)
- Listed weight: 205 lb (93 kg)

Career information
- High school: Boca Raton (FL) Pope John Paul II
- College: Washington
- NFL draft: 2006: undrafted

Career history
- Spokane Shock (2006); Kansas City Brigade (2007–2008); Jacksonville Sharks (2010)*; Spokane Shock (2012)*
- * Offseason or practice squad member only

Awards and highlights
- AFL Rookie of the Year (2007); All-Rookie Team (2007); First-team All-Pac-10 (2003); Washington co-Offensive MVP (2003)

Career AFL statistics
- Receptions: 191
- Receiving yards: 2,301
- Receiving TDs: 40
- Rushing yards: 157
- Rushing TDs: 17
- Stats at ArenaFan.com

Charles Frederick Jr. (born February 2, 1982) is an American former football wide receiver. Frederick was born in Lake Worth Beach, Florida. He played wide receiver for the University of Washington. He was signed as a free agent by the Spokane Shock in 2006. Frederick was the co-AFL Rookie of the Year in 2007 with the Kansas City Brigade. On January 13, 2012, it was announced that Frederick would return to the Shock for the 2012 season.

== Awards and honors ==
In 2007, Frederick was named the AFL Rookie of the Year.

== See also ==
- Washington Huskies football statistical leaders
