= Kansas City Command =

Arena football team

Logo

General information
- Founded: 2006
- Folded: 2012
- Headquartered: Sprint Center in Kansas City, Missouri
- Colors: Blue, black, and white
- Mascot: Captain Max Runway
- KCCommand.com

Personnel
- Owners: Chris Likens, Neil Smith, and other co-owners
- Head coach: Danton Barto

Team history
- Kansas City Brigade (2006–2008); Kansas City Command (2011–2012)

Home fields
- Kemper Arena (2006–2007); Sprint Center (2008, 2011–2012)

League / conference affiliations
- Arena Football League (2006–2008, 2011–2012): National Conference (2006, 2011–2012); South Division (2006); Central Division (2011–2012); American Conference (2007–2008); Central Division (2007–2008)

Playoff appearances (1)
- 2007

The Kansas City Command (formerly the Kansas City Brigade) were a professional arena football team that played in the Arena Football League (AFL). The team was founded before the 2006 season. Former Kansas City Chiefs strong safety Kevin Porter served as head coach. The team's new head coach in 2011 was Danton Barto.

The team played at Kemper Arena in Kansas City, Missouri and later moved to the Sprint Center in downtown Kansas City for the 2008 AFL season. The team was owned by a Kansas City local, Chris Likens. One of the most notable co-owners is former Kansas City Chiefs star Neil Smith. Captain Max Runway was named the mascot of the team in June 2007.

== History ==
After the announcement that the New Orleans VooDoo would suspend operations for the 2006 AFL season due to Hurricane Katrina, the AFL awarded an expansion franchise to Kansas City, containing most of the VooDoo's players. On November 21, 2005, the AFL announced that the team would be called the Kansas City Brigade. A stealth bomber, modeled after the B-2 Spirits stationed at nearby Whiteman Air Force Base, would represent the team for its logo. Kevin Porter was named the team's first head coach. They would be placed in the National Conference Southern Division, where they would take New Orleans' spot for the year.

=== 2006 season ===
On February 19, 2006, after losing the first three games of their inaugural season, the Brigade finally had their first victory 45–24 at home against the Columbus Destroyers. On April 9, 2006, after losing six-straight games, the Brigade finally managed their second win, defeating the Los Angeles Avengers 62–45 at home. On April 22, 2006, the Brigade recorded their first road win in franchise history against the Nashville Kats, winning 58–52. By the end of the 2006 season, the Brigade finished with a record of 3–13, placing them fifth in the National Conference Southern Division.

=== 2007 season ===
With the New Orleans VooDoo returning to the league's National Conference Southern in 2007, the Brigade switched conferences and divisions, as they moved to the American Conference Central.

On March 4, 2007, in their home opener, the Brigade defeated the defending Arena Bowl champion Chicago Rush 54–41. The game was broadcast nationally on ABC. The win marked the first time in franchise history that the Brigade were above .500 for the season.

On June 8, the Brigade clinched their first-ever playoff berth with a 47–34 victory over the Columbus Destroyers.

The Brigade finished the regular season with a 10–6 record. While earning the American Conference's #3 seed, the Brigade hosted their first playoff game on June 30, a wild-card matchup, with the American Conference's #6 seed, the Colorado Crush. Unfortunately for the Brigade, they were plagued by injuries and the Crush won 49–42, despite Colorado coming into the game with a four-game losing streak.

=== 2008 season ===
The 2008 season saw the longest field goal in franchise history (58 yards by Peter Martinez).

Former Dallas Cowboys quarterback Quincy Carter was named the starter on June 3, 2008. Carter lost all three of his starts. Quarterback D. Bryant was named to the AFL's 2008 All-Rookie Team. The Brigade suspended football operations following the 2008 season.

=== 2011 season ===
Kansas City returned for the 2011 AFL season and was renamed the Kansas City Command. The logo and color scheme remained the same and home games were still played at the Sprint Center in the heart of Kansas City. The Command went 0–3 to start the 2011 AFL season but bounced back with a win in their first home game against National Conference Central Division rival Iowa Barnstormers.

=== 2012 season ===
The Command played the 2012 AFL season finishing 4th in the Central division at 3-15. On August 23, the team announced that they were shutting down operations and would not be returning to the AFL for the 2013 season.

== Coaches ==
Head coach	Tenure	Regular season record (W–L)	Post season record (W–L)	Most recent coaching staff	Notes
Kevin Porter	2006–2008	16–32	0–1	OC: Rickey Foggie; DC: Vacant; DL coach: Otis Moore; OL coach: Travis Crusenberry	
Danton Barto	2011–2012	9–27	0–0	OL & ST:Richard McCleskey; AHC/DC: Brian Hug; DB coach: Eldrick Hill; WR coach: Tod Devoe	

== Season-by-season ==
ArenaBowl champions	ArenaBowl appearance	Division champions	Playoff berth

Season	League	Conference	Division	Regular season			Postseason results
Season	League	Conference	Division	Finish	Wins	Losses	Postseason results
Kansas City Brigade
2006	AFL	National	Southern	5th	3	13	
2007	AFL	American	Central	2nd	10	6	Lost Wild Card Round (Colorado) 49–42
2008	AFL	American	Central	4th	3	13	
2009	The AFL suspended operations for the 2009 season.						
2010	Did not play in 2010.						
Kansas City Command
2011	AFL	National	Central	4th	6	12	
2012	AFL	National	Central	4th	3	15	
Total					25	59	(includes only regular season)
Total					0	1	(includes only the postseason)
Total					25	60	(includes both regular season and postseason)

== Notable players ==
=== Individual award ===
Offensive Lineman of the Year
Season	Player	Position
2011	Rich Ranglin	OL

AFL Rookie of the Year
Season	Player	Position
2007	Charles Frederick	WR

=== All-Arena players ===
The following Brigade/Command players were named to All-Arena Teams:

- OL Rich Ranglin (1)

=== All-Ironman players ===
The following Brigade/Command players were named to All-Ironman Teams:

- WR/KR Jackie Chambers (1)

=== All-Rookie players ===
The following Brigade/Command players were named to All-Rookie Teams:

- QB D. Bryant
- WR/LB Aaron Boone
- WR Charles Frederick

== Retired numbers ==
- #90 Neil Smith, team co-owner and former NFL Defensive end.
