= 2007 Utah Blaze season =

Football season

- Head coach: Danny White
- Home stadium: EnergySolutions Arena

Results
- Record: 8–8
- Division place: 3rd
- Playoffs: L 64–42 vs. Los Angeles Avengers
- Team OPY: Siaha Burley

The 2007 Utah Blaze season was the second season for the arena football franchise. They look to make the playoffs after finishing 2006 with a 7–9 record. They went 8–8 record and qualified for the playoffs.

== Schedule ==
Week	Date	Opponent	Home/Away Game	Result
1	March 3	New Orleans VooDoo	Home	W 63–61
2	March 10	Arizona Rattlers	Away	W 75–71
3	March 18	Nashville Kats	Away	L 69–55
4	March 23	Grand Rapids Rampage	Home	W 83–42
5	April 1	Las Vegas Gladiators	Away	W 57–47
6	April 6	Austin Wranglers	Away	L 65–64
7	April 13	Los Angeles Avengers	Home	W 76–63
8	April 20	Arizona Rattlers	Home	L 83–69
9	April 28	San Jose SaberCats	Away	L 69–48
10	May 4	Dallas Desperados	Home	L 66–59
11	May 12	Kansas City Brigade	Away	L 60–41
12	May 18	Las Vegas Gladiators	Home	L 54–53
13	May 25	Orlando Predators	Away	W 65–62
14	June 4	Colorado Crush	Home	W 51–14
15	June 9	San Jose SaberCats	Home	L 70–49
16		Bye	Week	
17	June 23	Los Angeles Avengers	Away	W 47–37

== Playoff schedule ==
Round	Date	Opponent	Home/Away Game	Result
1	July 2	(4) Los Angeles Avengers	Away	L 64–42

== Roster ==
(As of 2007-03-12)

Number	Name	Position	Height	Weight
1	Justin Taplin	WR/DB	6 ft 0 in	185 lb
2	Troy Mason	OS	5 ft 9 in	170 lb
4	Orshawante Bryant	WR/DB	6 ft 0 in	185 lb
5	Siaha Burley	OS	6 ft 0 in	185 lb
6	Sale Key	WR/LB	6 ft 4 in	225 lb
7	Thal Woods	DS	5 ft 9 in	175 lb
9	Ryan Dennard	WR/LB	6 ft 3 in	215 lb
10	Joe Germaine	QB	6 ft 2 in	220 lb
12	Garrett Smith	OL/OL	6 ft 3 in	285 lb
13	Steve Videtich	K	6 ft 2 in	185 lb
14	Kevin Moffett	DS	6 ft 1 in	185 lb
15	Tali Ena	QB	6 ft 4 in	235 lb
17	Jason Gesser	QB	6 ft 1 in	210 lb
20	Kevin Clemens	FB/LB	6 ft 1 in	275 lb
21	Kelvin Hunter	DS	5 ft 10 in	185 lb
23	Tom Pace	WR/LB	5 ft 11 in	215 lb
31	Chris Robinson	FB/LB	6 ft 3 in	272 lb
32	Emmett White	WR/LB	6 ft 0 in	217 lb
40	Craig Kobel	FB/LB	6 ft 2 in	265 lb
44	Ronnie Washburn	OL/OL	6 ft 3 in	275 lb
53	Scott Pospisil	OL/OL	6 ft 2 in	285 lb
59	Doug Kaufusi	OL/OL	6 ft 6 in	305 lb
72	Hans Olsen	OL/OL	6 ft 4 in	295 lb
97	Ernest Grant	OL/OL	6 ft 6 in	320 lb
98	Lewis Powell	OL/OL	6 ft 3 in	285 lb
99	Bryan Henderson	OL/OL	6 ft 5 in	285 lb

== Coaching ==
Danny White entered his second season as the head coach of the Blaze.

== Stats ==
=== Offense ===
==== Quarterback ====
Player	Comp.	Att.	Comp%	Yards	TD's	INT's	Long	Rating
Joe Germaine	422	617	68.4	5005	107	12	41	124.4

==== Running backs ====
Player	Car.	Yards	Avg.	TD's	Long
Chris Robinson	13	58	4.5	3	10
Kautai Olevao	10	32	3.2	1	8
Kevin Clemens	25	31	1.2	4	5
Joe Germaine	17	8	0.5	6	3
Frank Carter	11	6	0.5	4	4
Tom Pace	9	6	0.7	1	4
Ryan Dennard	1	5	5	1	5

==== Wide receivers ====
Player	Rec.	Yards	Avg.	TD's	Long
Siaha Burley	166	2129	12.8	49	41
Tom Pace	111	1198	10.8	20	33
Ryan Dennard	35	449	12.8	14	38
Aaron Boone	32	420	13.1	8	40
Orshawante Bryant	24	331	13.8	5	37
Justin Skaggs*	21	196	9.3	4	30
J'Sharlon Jones	18	146	8.1	3	22
Chris Robinson	4	46	11.5	0	16
John Kulp	4	42	10.5	3	15
Huey Whittaker	2	33	16.5	1	20
Kevin Clemens	4	21	5.3	0	13
Myniya Smith	2	14	7	1	8
Frank Carter	1	6	6	0	6
Rob Gatrell	1	4	4	1	4

==== Touchdowns ====
Player	TD's	Rush	Rec	Ret	Pts
Siaha Burley	49	0	49	0	294
Tom Pace	21	1	20	0	128
Ryan Dennard	15	1	14	0	90
Aaron Boone	9	0	8	1	54
Joe Germaine	6	6	0	0	36
Orshawante Bryant	5	5	0	0	36
Frank Carter	4	4	0	0	26
Kevin Clemens	4	4	0	0	24
Justin Skaggs*	4	0	4	0	24
John Culp	3	0	3	0	18
J'Sharlon Jones	3	0	3	0	18
Chris Robinson	3	3	0	0	18
Clarence Lawson	2	0	0	2	12
Kautai Olevao	1	1	0	0	8
Rob Gatrell	1	0	1	0	6
Kevin Moffett	1	0	0	1	6
Myniya Smith	1	0	1	0	6
Huey Whittaker	1	0	1	0	6

=== Defense ===
Player	Tackles	Solo	Assisted	Sack	Solo	Assisted	INT	Yards	TD's	Long
Kelvin Hunter	64	58	12	0	0	0	4	13	0	10
Orshawante Bryant	58	51	14	0	0	0	2	13	0	11
Justin Skaggs*	47	34	26	1	1	0	0	0	0	0
Thal Woods	45.5	37	17	0	0	0	2	0	0	0
Justin Taplin	34	28	12	0	0	0	1	13	0	13
Tom Pace	27	17	20	0	0	0	2	6	0	6
Kevin Clemens	21.5	14	15	2	2	0	0	0	0	0
Ryan Dennard	20	14	12	0	0	0	1	0	0	0
Sullivan Beard	18	15	6	0	0	0	0	0	0	0
Kautai Olevao	15	10	10	0	0	0	0	0	0	0
Aaron Hamilton	13.5	10	7	1	1	0	0	0	0	0
Kevin Moffett	13.5	12	3	0	0	0	0	0	0	0
Scott Pospisil	13	8	10	1	1	0	0	0	0	0
Hans Olsen	11.5	5	13	2	2	0	0	0	0	0
Chris Robinson	9.5	7	5	0	0	0	1	2	0	2
Ernest Grant	7.5	5	5	0	0	0	1	2	0	2
Craig Kobel	6.5	6	1	0	0	0	0	0	0	0
Sale Key	6	6	0	0	0	0	0	0	0	0
Ronnie Washburn	5	3	4	1	1	0	0	0	0	0
Garrett Smith	4.5	3	3	0	0	0	0	0	0	0
John Culp	4	2	4	0	0	0	0	0	0	0
Jermaine Younger	3.5	2	3	0	0	0	0	0	0	0
Joe Germaine	3	3	0	0	0	0	0	0	0	0
Jason Gesser	3	3	0	0	0	0	0	0	0	0
Dennis Gile	3	3	0	0	0	0	0	0	0	0
Lewis Powell	3	2	2	0	0	0	0	0	0	0
Siaha Burley	2.5	2	1	0	0	0	0	0	0	0
Steve Videtich	2	2	0	0	0	0	0	0	0	0
Andy Kelly	1	1	0	0	0	0	0	0	0	0

=== Special teams ===
==== Kick return ====
Player	Ret	Yards	TD's	Long	Avg	Ret	Yards	TD's	Long	Avg
Clarence Lawson	48	911	2	58	19	3	23	0	11	7.7
Tom Pace	29	625	0	46	21.6	0	0	0	0	0
Siaha Burley	9	221	0	41	24.6	0	0	0	0	0
J'Sharlon Jones	10	170	0	28	17	2	10	0	10	5
Kevin Moffett	3	93	1	57	31	0	0	0	0	0
Aaron Boone	1	9	1	9	9	0	0	0	0	0
Ryan Dennard	2	4	0	2	2	0	0	0	0	0

==== Kicking ====
Player	Extra pt.	Extra pt. Att.	FG	FGA	Long	Pct.	Pts
Steve Videtich	113	127	10	19	32	0.526	143

*Traded, released, or deceased

== Playoff Stats ==
=== Offense ===
==== Quarterback ====
Player	Comp.	Att.	Comp%	Yards	TD's	INT's

==== Running backs ====
Player	Car.	Yards	Avg.	TD's	Long

==== Wide receivers ====
Player	Rec.	Yards	Avg.	TD's	Long

=== Special teams ===
==== Kick return ====
Player	Ret	Yards	Avg	Long

==== Kicking ====
Player	Extra pt.	Extra pt. Att.	FG	FGA	Long	Pts

== Regular season ==
=== Week 1: vs New Orleans VooDoo ===
Scoring Summary:

1st Quarter:

2nd Quarter:

3rd Quarter:

4th Quarter:

Attendance:

=== Week 2: at Arizona Rattlers ===
Scoring Summary:

1st Quarter:

2nd Quarter:

3rd Quarter:

4th Quarter:

Attendance:

=== Week 3: at Nashville Kats ===
Scoring Summary:

1st Quarter:

2nd Quarter:

3rd Quarter:

4th Quarter:

Attendance:

=== Week 4: vs Grand Rapids Rampage ===
Scoring Summary:

1st Quarter:

2nd Quarter:

3rd Quarter:

4th Quarter:

Attendance: 12684

=== Week 5: at Las Vegas Gladiators ===
Scoring Summary:

1st Quarter:

2nd Quarter:

3rd Quarter:

4th Quarter:

Attendance:

=== Week 6: at Austin Wranglers ===
Scoring Summary:

1st Quarter:

2nd Quarter:

3rd Quarter:

4th Quarter:

Attendance:

=== Week 7: vs Los Angeles Avengers ===
Scoring Summary:

1st Quarter:

2nd Quarter:

3rd Quarter:

4th Quarter:

Attendance:

=== Week 8: vs Arizona Rattlers ===
Scoring Summary:

1st Quarter:

2nd Quarter:

3rd Quarter:

4th Quarter:

Attendance:

=== Week 9: at San Jose SaberCats ===
Scoring Summary:

1st Quarter:

2nd Quarter:

3rd Quarter:

4th Quarter:

Attendance:

=== Week 10: vs Dallas Desperados ===
Scoring Summary:

1st Quarter:

2nd Quarter:

3rd Quarter:

4th Quarter:

Attendance:

=== Week 11: at Kansas City Brigade ===
Scoring Summary:

1st Quarter:

2nd Quarter:

3rd Quarter:

4th Quarter:

Attendance:

=== Week 12: vs Las Vegas Gladiators ===
Scoring Summary:

1st Quarter:

2nd Quarter:

3rd Quarter:

4th Quarter:

Attendance:

=== Week 13: at Orlando Predators ===
Scoring Summary:

1st Quarter:

2nd Quarter:

3rd Quarter:

4th Quarter:

Attendance:

=== Week 14: vs Colorado Crush ===
Scoring Summary:

1st Quarter:

2nd Quarter:

3rd Quarter:

4th Quarter:

Attendance:

=== Week 15: vs San Jose SaberCats ===
Scoring Summary:

1st Quarter:

2nd Quarter:

3rd Quarter:

4th Quarter:

Attendance:

=== Week 17: at Los Angeles Avengers ===
Scoring Summary:

1st Quarter:

2nd Quarter:

3rd Quarter:

4th Quarter:

Attendance:

== Playoffs ==
=== Week 1: vs (4) Los Angeles Avengers ===
	1	2	3	4	Total
(5) UTA	14	0	7	21	42
(4) LA	14	23	14	13	64

at Staples Center, Los Angeles, California

Scoring Summary:

1st Quarter:

2nd Quarter:

3rd Quarter:

4th Quarter:

Attendance: 13,066

- Offensive player of the game: Sonny Cumbie (LA)
- Defensive player of the game: Silas Demary (LA)
- Ironman of the game: Josh Jeffries (LA)

Team	1st Down.	Rush. Yds	Pass. Yds	Fumbles/lost	Fumble yds	Penal./yds	TOP	3rd Down.	4th Down.
UTA	17	3	323	3/2	15	6/36	28:21	3/7	0/3
LA	20	18	306	3/3	0	5/32	31:39	2/5	1/1
