= 2006 Utah Blaze season =

Arena Football League team season

- Head coach: Danny White
- Home stadium: Delta Center

Results
- Record: 7–9
- Division place: 3rd
- Playoffs: L 57–34 vs. Arizona

The 2006 Utah Blaze season was the first season for the franchise. They finished 7–9 record and qualified for the playoffs, although they lost 57–34 against Arizona to lose their first franchise playoff game.

== Roster at beginning of season ==
(As of 2006-03-12)

Number	Name	Position	Height	Weight
1	Justin Taplin	Wide receiver/defensive back	6 ft 0 in	185 lb
2	Troy Mason	Offensive Specialist	5 ft 9 in	170 lb
3	Justin Skaggs	Wide receiver/linebacker	6 ft 2 in	202 lb
4	Orshawante Bryant	Wide receiver/defensive back	6 ft 0 in	185 lb
5	Siaha Burley	Offensive Specialist	6 ft 0 in	185 lb
6	Sale Key	Wide receiver/linebacker	6 ft 4 in	225 lb
7	Thal Woods	Defensive Specialist	5 ft 9 in	175 lb
9	Ryan Dennard	Wide receiver/linebacker	6 ft 3 in	215 lb
10	Joe Germaine	Quarterback	6 ft 2 in	220 lb
12	Garrett Smith	Offensive line/Defensive line	6 ft 3 in	285 lb
13	Steve Videtich	Kicker	6 ft 2 in	185 lb
14	Kevin Moffett	Defensive Specialist	6 ft 1 in	185 lb
15	Tali Ena	Quarterback	6 ft 4 in	235 lb
17	Jason Gesser	Quarterback	6 ft 1 in	210 lb
20	Kevin Clemens	Fullback/linebacker	6 ft 1 in	275 lb
21	Kelvin Hunter	Defensive Specialist	5 ft 10 in	185 lb
23	Tom Pace	Wide receiver/linebacker	5 ft 11 in	215 lb
31	Chris Robinson	Fullback/Linebacker	6 ft 3 in	272 lb
32	Emmett White	Wide receiver/linebacker	6 ft 0 in	217 lb
40	Craig Kobel	Fullback/Linebacker	6 ft 2 in	265 lb
44	Ronnie Washburn	Offensive line/Defensive line	6 ft 3 in	275 lb
53	Scott Pospisil	Offensive line/Defensive line	6 ft 2 in	285 lb
59	Doug Kaufusi	Offensive line/Defensive line	6 ft 6 in	305 lb
72	Hans Olsen	Offensive line/Defensive line	6 ft 4 in	295 lb
97	Ernest Grant	Offensive line/Defensive line	6 ft 6 in	320 lb
98	Lewis Powell	Offensive line/Defensive line	6 ft 3 in	285 lb
99	Bryan Henderson	Offensive line/Defensive line	6 ft 5 in	285 lb

== Coaching ==
Danny White entered his first season as the head coach of the Blaze.

== Stats ==
=== Offense ===
==== Quarterback ====
Player	Comp.	Att.	Comp%	Yards	TD's	INT's	Long	Rating
Joe Germaine	184	273	67.3	2330	41	5	42	123.7
Jason Gesser	89	145	61.4	1092	23	7	45	104.1
Andy Kelly	292	456	64	3258	51	17	48	97.6
Dennis Gile	11	25	44	141	2	3	40	42.7

==== Running backs ====
Player	Car.	Yards	Avg.	TD's	Long
Kevin Clemens	44	67	1.5	10	7
Kautai Olevao	12	46	3.8	2	9
Chris Robinson	10	25	2.5	2	8
Tom Pace	14	19	1.4	2	10
Jermaine Younger	6	18	3	1	6

==== Wide receivers ====
Player	Rec.	Yards	Avg.	TD's	Long

==== Touchdowns ====
Player	TD's	Rush	Rec	Ret	Pts

=== Defense ===
Player	Tackles	Solo	Assisted	Sack	Solo	Assisted	INT	Yards	TD's	Long
