= ArenaBowl XVIII =

Annual league championship game

| San Jose SaberCats (#2) | Arizona Rattlers (#1) |
|---|---|
| 69 | 62 |
| | 1 | 2 | 3 | 4 | Total |
|---|---|---|---|---|---|
| SJ | 14 | 21 | 7 | 27 | 69 |
| ARI | 14 | 14 | 14 | 20 | 62 |
- Date: June 27, 2004
- Stadium: America West Arena; Phoenix, Arizona
- MVP: Mark Grieb, QB, San Jose: Mark Grieb, QB, San Jose (Offensive Player of the Game); Ricky Parker, DS, Arizona (Defensive Player of the Game); James Roe, WR/LB, San Jose (Ironman of the Game)
- Attendance: 17,391
- Winning coach: Darren Arbet
- Losing coach: Danny White

TV in the United States
- Network: NBC
- Announcers: Tom Hammond; Pat Haden; Lewis Johnson; Marty Snider

ArenaBowl XVIII saw the San Jose SaberCats and Arizona Rattlers competing for the 2004 Arena Football League championship. Until 2010, this game marked the last time the ArenaBowl was held at the home arena of the higher-seeded team, rather than a neutral site, and 17,391 fans packed the sold-out America West Arena as the visiting SaberCats defeated the homestanding Rattlers, 69–62 in a rematch of ArenaBowl XVI.

== Game summary ==
ArenaBowl XVIII featured the league's two top-seeded teams and one of its more storied and bitter rivalries. The Rattlers were looking for redemption, having been demolished by San Jose 52–14 in ArenaBowl XVI and again falling short, 43–29 to the Tampa Bay Storm in the previous year's contest. Meanwhile, the SaberCats were seeking revenge after the Rattlers had swept them during the regular season, winning the Western Division championship and the top seed in the playoffs in the process.

The game did not disappoint, as the two teams' offenses matched each other blow-for-blow virtually all game. Perhaps the most stereotypically "arena football" of all ArenaBowls to date, neither defense proved capable of slowing the opposing offense, and the game appeared as though it would be decided by which team had the final possession.

The final play of the first half, however, proved to be decisive. Rattlers legend Hunkie Cooper had scored a rushing touchdown with seven seconds remaining in the half to tie the game at 28. However, the SaberCats were able to get one final offensive play in before time expired, and James Roe made the most of it by catching a short pass from Mark Grieb and breaking multiple tackles en route to a spectacular 38-yard touchdown – his fourth of the game – to end the half with San Jose leading 35–28, thus preventing the Rattlers from gaining the lead with their first possession of the second half.

The second half played out largely the same as the first, with the two teams again exchanging touchdowns virtually at will. With San Jose leading 63–56, Arizona quarterback Sherdrick Bonner connected with receiver Siaha Burley for a nine-yard score. Rattlers coach Danny White elected to attempt to break the string of ties by attempting a two-point conversion, but San Jose defender Omarr Smith broke up a Bonner pass intended for Hunkie Cooper, leaving the SaberCats in front, 63–62. White elected to attempt an onside kick to regain possession, but San Jose's Chuck Reed recovered the ball and quickly returned it seven yards for a touchdown. Scoring so soon could have proven costly for San Jose, as the Rattlers regained possession with 30 seconds left and trailing just 69–62, thanks to a missed extra point by San Jose kicker Dan Frantz.

Bonner and the Rattlers mounted one final drive, however, advancing to the San Jose five-yard line with two seconds on the clock. However, Bonner's final pass was incomplete, and the SaberCats emerged victorious, 69–62.

The game was the highest-scoring game in ArenaBowl history, with a combined 131 points being scored, shattering the five-year-old ArenaBowl XIII mark of 107. Roe caught eight passes for 119 yards and an ArenaBowl-record-tying five touchdowns to earn Ironman of the Game honors, while San Jose quarterback Mark Grieb completed 27 of 36 passes for 328 yards and eight scores to be named Offensive Player of the Game. Bonner threw seven touchdown passes – four to Siaha Burley and three to Orshawante Bryant to lead the Rattler offense, while Arizona defensive specialist Ricky Parker was named Defensive Player of the Game.

The game marked Danny White's last as head coach of the Rattlers, and indeed the end of an era for the franchise itself. Legendary Hunkie Cooper would see limited playing time early in the 2005 season before retiring, while White, the only coach to date in the 13-year history of the Rattlers organization, would not be retained by new owner Robert Sarver. Additionally, defensive coordinator Doug Plank would depart to become the head coach of the Georgia Force, who he would lead to ArenaBowl XIX the following year. Meanwhile, it was the second title in three years for coach Darren Arbet and the SaberCats.

== Scoring summary ==
=== 1st Quarter ===
- AZ – Burley 29 pass from Bonner (Garner kick) – 7–0 ARI
- SJ – Roe 8 pass from Grieb (Frantz kick) – 7–7
- AZ – Bryant 33 pass from Bonner (Garner kick) – 14–7 ARI
- SJ – Coleman 22 pass from Grieb (Frantz kick) – 14–14

=== 2nd Quarter ===
- SJ – Roe 11 pass from Grieb (Frantz kick) – 21–14 SJ
- AZ – Burley 26 pass from Bonner (Garner kick) – 21–21
- SJ – Roe 3 pass from Grieb (Frantz kick) – 28–21 SJ
- AZ – Cooper 4 run (Garner kick) – 28–28
- SJ – Roe 38 pass from Grieb (Frantz kick) – 35–28 SJ

=== 3rd Quarter ===
- AZ – Kelly 6 run (Garner kick) – 35–35
- SJ – Roe 38 pass from Grieb (Frantz kick) – 42–35 SJ
- AZ – Bryant 21 pass from Bonner (Garner kick) – 42–42

=== 4th Quarter ===
- SJ – Wagner 1 run (Frantz kick) – 49–42 SJ
- AZ – Bryant 7 pass from Bonner (Garner kick) – 49–49
- SJ – Hundon 33 pass from Grieb (Frantz kick) – 56–49 SJ
- AZ – Burley 5 pass from Bonner (Garner kick) – 56–56
- SJ – Coleman 2 pass from Grieb (Frantz kick) – 63–56 SJ
- AZ – Burley 9 pass from Bonner (Bonner pass failed) – 63–62 SJ
- SJ – Reed 7 kick return (Frantz kick failed) – 69–62 SJ

== Trivia ==
On the Arena Football League's 20 Greatest Highlights Countdown (shown on arenafootball.com during the league's 20th season), this is at #18.
