= Delbert Cowsette =

American football player and coach (born 1977)

Howard Bison
- Title: Defensive line coach

Personal information
- Born: September 3, 1977 (age 49); Cleveland, Ohio, U.S.
- Listed height: 6 ft 1 in (1.85 m)
- Listed weight: 290 lb (132 kg)

Career information
- Position: Defensive tackle (No. 91, 97, 93)
- High school: Cleveland Central Catholic
- College: Maryland (1995–1999)
- NFL draft: 2000: 7th round, 216th overall pick

Career history

Playing
- Washington Redskins (2000)*; Indianapolis Colts (2000)*; Washington Redskins (2000–2002); Tampa Bay Buccaneers (2004)*; New York Giants (2004)*; Tampa Bay Buccaneers (2005)*; → Cologne Centurions (2005); Utah Blaze (2006)*; Austin Wranglers (2006)*; New York Dragons (2006); Chicago Bears (2006); New York Dragons (2007); Philadelphia Soul (2007); New Orleans VooDoo (2008)
- * Offseason or practice squad member only

Coaching
- Maryland (2007) Assistant strength and conditioning coach; Maryland (2008–2009) Assistant defensive line coach; Hampton (2010) Defensive line coach; Virginia Destroyers (2011) Assistant defensive line coach; Hampton (2012–2013) Defensive line coach; Albany (2014–2018) Defensive line coach; Maryland (2019) Defensive line coach; Air Force (2020–2021) Assistant defensive line coach; Saskatchewan Roughriders (2023) Defensive line coach; Howard (2024–present) Defensive line coach

Awards and highlights
- UFL champion (2011); First-team All-ACC (1999)

Career NFL statistics
- Tackles: 25
- Sacks: 2
- Stats at Pro Football Reference

Career AFL statistics
- Tackles: 26.5
- Sacks: 6
- Forced fumbles: 3
- Stats at ArenaFan.com

Delbert Ray Cowsette (born September 3, 1977) is an American former professional football player who was a defensive tackle in the National Football League (NFL) and Arena Football League (AFL). He is currently the defensive line coach for the Howard Bison.

Cowsette was selected by the Washington Redskins in the seventh round of the 2000 NFL draft after playing college football for the Maryland Terrapins. He played 32 games for the Redskins from 2001 to 2002. Cowsette was also a member of the Indianapolis Colts, Tampa Bay Buccaneers, New York Giants, and Chicago Bears of the NFL but did not appear in any games for any of those teams. He played for the Cologne Centurions of NFL Europe in 2005, and the New York Dragons and Philadelphia Soul of the AFL from 2006 to 2007.

He has served over 15 years as a college and professional defensive line coach.

== Early life ==
Delbert Ray Cowsette was born on September 3, 1977, in Cleveland, Ohio. He attended Cleveland Central Catholic High School in Cleveland. He recorded 52 tackles, eight sacks and five forced fumbles his senior year, earning all-state and All-Midwest honors. Cowsette also participated in wrestling in high school and was a four-year letterman. He won the heavyweight state title in wrestling. He graduated from Central Catholic in 1995.

== College career ==
Cowsette played college football for the Maryland Terrapins of the University of Maryland, College Park from 1996 to 1999 and was a four-year letterman. He redshirted in 1995. He played in all 11 games, starting three, his freshman year in 1996, accumulating 40 tackles, two sacks, and one fumble recovery that he returned 54 yards for a touchdown. Cowsette started all 11 games at defensive tackle during the 1997 season, totaling 63 tackles and two sacks. He started all 11 games for the second consecutive season in 1998 and made 96 tackles, three sacks, one forced fumble and one pass breakup, earning honorable mention All-Atlantic Coast Conference (ACC) honors. He was a team captain his senior year in 1999 as he started 11 games for the third straight year while recording 81 tackles and six sacks, garnering first-team All-ACC recognition. Cowsette played in all 44 games, starting 36, for the Terrapins during his college career and made 280 tackles. He graduated with a bachelor's degree in geography.

== Professional career ==
Cowsette was selected by the Washington Redskins in the seventh round, with the 216th overall pick, of the 2000 NFL draft. He officially signed with the team on May 18. He was waived on August 27 and signed to the team's practice squad the next day. Cowsette was waived by the Redskins on November 13, 2000.

He was signed to the practice squad of the Indianapolis Colts on December 7, 2000.

On December 19, 2000, he was signed by the Redskins off of the Colts' practice squad. Cowsette played in all 16 games for the Redskins in 2001, recording eight solo tackles, and two assisted tackles. During the 2002 preseason, Cowsette was fined $10,000 for a hit on Pittsburgh Steelers quarterback Charlie Batch that caused a chin laceration. Cowsette appeared in all 16 games for the second straight season in 2002, totaling 11 solo tackles, four assisted tackles, and two sacks. He was waived by the Redskins on August 31, 2003.

Cowsette signed a reserve/future contract with the Tampa Bay Buccaneers on January 5, 2004. He was waived on May 13, 2004.

He was signed by the New York Giants on July 30, 2004. He was waived by the Giants on August 31, 2004.

Cowsette signed another reserve/future contract with the Buccaneers on January 19, 2005. He was allocated to NFL Europe to play for the Cologne Centurions. He played in all 10 games, starting nine, for the Centurions during the 2005 NFL Europe season, posting 18 tackles, three sacks, and one pass breakup. Cowsette was waived by the Buccaneers on September 3, 2005.

In late September 2005, he was selected by the Utah Blaze of the Arena Football League (AFL) in the expansion draft. On October 5, 2005, he was traded to the Austin Wranglers for Bryan Henderson. On November 1, 2005, Cowsette and Richard McCleskey were traded to the New York Dragons for Josh White. Cowsette played in all 16 games for the Dragons in 2006, accumulating nine solo tackles, 13 assisted tackles, five sacks, three forced fumbles, two fumble recoveries, and two pass breakups while also catching two passes for seven yards. He was named to the AFL All-Rookie team as an offensive/defensive lineman.

He was signed by the Chicago Bears on August 10, 2006. He was waived on September 1, but later re-signed on December 20 before being waived again on December 25, 2006.

Cowsette re-signed with the Dragons on October 11, 2006. He was placed on refused to report on February 10, 2007, but was activated the next day. He appeared in six games during the 2007 season, recording three solo tackles, nine assisted tackles, and one sack. Cowsette was waived on April 27, 2007.

He was claimed off waivers by the Philadelphia Soul on May 1, 2007. He played in five games for the Soul in 2007, accumulating one solo tackle and five assisted tackles. Cowsette was placed on injured reserve on June 19, 2007. He was waived on February 22, 2008.

Cowsette signed with the New Orleans VooDoo of the AFL on March 10, 2008. He was waived on March 13, 2008.

== Coaching career ==
Cowsette began his coaching career as the assistant strength and conditioning coach for the Maryland Terrapins in 2007. He then served as the team's assistant defensive line coach from 2008 to 2009.

He was the defensive line coach for the Hampton Pirates of Hampton University in 2010, and the assistant defensive line coach of the Virginia Destroyers of the United Football League (UFL) in 2011. The Destroyers won the UFL championship that season. He returned as defensive line coach at Hampton from 2012 to 2013.

Cowsette then served as the defensive line coach for the Albany Great Danes of University at Albany, SUNY from 2014 to 2018, the defensive line coach at Maryland in 2019, and the assistant defensive line coach of the Air Force Falcons of the United States Air Force Academy from 2020 to 2021.

He rejoined the professional ranks in 2023 as the defensive line coach for the Saskatchewan Roughriders of the Canadian Football League. He then became the defensive line coach for the Howard Bison of Howard University in 2024.

== Personal life ==
While at Maryland, Cowsette was a scholar-athlete in spring 1998 and was also a member of the school's student-athlete advisory council. He is a co-founder of the Premiere Intermediate Football League, a youth football league. He is also the owner of In Between the Lines, a non-profit youth organization. Cowsette married Alena Cowsette and they had three children.
