= Josh White (American football) =

American football player (born 1977)

No. 40
- Positions: Fullback, linebacker

Personal information
- Born: March 8, 1977; Galveston, Texas, U.S.
- Died: June 9, 2020 (aged 43)
- Listed height: 6 ft 0 in (1.83 m)
- Listed weight: 275 lb (125 kg)

Career information
- High school: Farrington (Honolulu, Hawaii)
- College: California
- NFL draft: 2000: undrafted

Career history
- Hawaiian Islanders (2002–2003); New York Dragons (2004–2005); Austin Wranglers (2006); Utah Blaze (2006); Dallas Desperados (2006–2008); Dallas Vigilantes (2010); Chicago Rush (2010)

Awards and highlights
- Second-team All-Arena (2007)

Career AFL statistics
- Tackles: 112
- Sacks: 4.5
- Rushing yards: 1,009
- Rushing TDs: 50
- Receiving TDs: 8
- Stats at ArenaFan.com

Joshua "Zeus" White (March 8, 1977 – June 9, 2020) was an American professional football fullback who played six seasons in the Arena Football League (AFL) with the New York Dragons, Austin Wranglers, Dallas Desperados, Dallas Vigilantes and Chicago Rush. He played college football at Snow College and the University of California, Berkeley. White was also a member of the Hawaiian Islanders and Utah Blaze.

== Early life ==
White first played high school football at Admiral Arthur W. Radford High School in Honolulu, Hawaii. He transferred to Farrington High School in Honolulu his senior year after the military transferred his stepfather to North Carolina. He earned first team all-state honors as a running back. He is blind in his left eye due to a childhood accident when he was one.

== College career ==
White first played college football for the Snow Badgers of Snow College. He helped the Badgers to a 10–1 record and the Western States Football League title his freshman year in 1996. He rushed 142 times for 619 yards and nine touchdowns in 1996. White also recorded 33 receptions for 352 yards and a touchdown. He was named the Offensive MVP of the 1996 Midwest Bowl in Chicago.

White played for the California Bears of the University of California, Berkeley from 1997 to 1999. He recorded career totals of 339 yards and five touchdowns on 95 rushing attempts.

== Professional career ==
Pre-draft measurables
Height	Weight
5 ft 11 1/4 in (1.81 m)	256 lb (116 kg)
Values from Pro Day

White played for the Hawaiian Islanders of the af2 from 2002 to 2003.

He signed with the New York Dragons on November 12, 2003. He played for the Dragons from 2004 to 2005.

White was traded to the on Austin Wranglers for Delbert Cowsette and Richard McCleskey on November 1, 2005. He was placed on recallable waivers by the Wranglers on February 14, 2006.

He signed with the Utah Blaze on February 16, 2006.

He was traded to the Dallas Desperados for past considerations on February 17, 2006. He played for the Dragons from 2006 to 2008, earning Second Team All-Arena honors in 2007.

White played for the Dallas Vigilantes during the 2010 season. He was released by the Vigilantes on June 30, 2010.

He was signed by the Chicago Rush on July 15, 2010.

== Personal life ==
White moved back to Hawaii, where his oldest son played offensive line at Saint Louis School. He died at the age of 43 and was survived by his wife Ginger, four children, and three grandchildren.
