= Tim McGill =

American football player (born 1979)

No. 91, 93, 8
- Position: Defensive lineman

Personal information
- Born: June 24, 1979 (age 47); Chicago, Illinois, U.S.
- Listed height: 6 ft 2 in (1.88 m)
- Listed weight: 330 lb (150 kg)

Career information
- High school: Lake View (Chicago)
- College: Illinois
- NFL draft: 2003: undrafted

Career history
- Carolina Cobras (2003); New York Dragons (2004); New York Jets (2004–2005)*; Hamburg Sea Devils (2005); Miami Dolphins (2005); Green Bay Packers (2005–2006)*; Utah Blaze (2006)*; Nashville Kats (2007); Tampa Bay Storm (2007–2011); New Orleans Saints (2008)*; Montreal Alouettes (2009)*; San Jose SaberCats (2012); San Antonio Talons (2013); Colorado Ice (2015–2016)
- * Offseason or practice squad member only

Awards and highlights
- Second-team All-Arena (2008); 3× First-team All-Arena (2010, 2011, 2013)

Career AFL statistics
- Tackles: 97
- Sacks: 37.5
- Forced fumbles: 8
- Fumble recoveries: 3
- Pass breakups: 9
- Stats at ArenaFan.com
- Stats at CFL.ca (archive)

Tim McGill (born June 24, 1979) is an American former professional football defensive tackle. He was signed by the Carolina Cobras as an undrafted free agent in 2003. He played college football at Illinois.

McGill was also a member of the Carolina Cobras, New York Dragons, New York Jets, Hamburg Sea Devils, Miami Dolphins, Green Bay Packers, Utah Blaze, Nashville Kats, Tampa Bay Storm, New Orleans Saints, Montreal Alouettes, San Jose SaberCats, San Antonio Talons, and Colorado Ice.

== Early life ==
McGill attended Lake View High School in Chicago, Illinois. As a member of the football team, McGill played both running back and defensive line. He also participated in track & field as a discus thrower.

== College career ==
On February 8, 1998, McGill accepted a football scholarship to Illinois to play fullback, drawing comparisons to Byron Morris.

== Professional career ==
In 2003, McGill was a member of the Carolina Cobras before being traded to the New York Dragons for Matt Nagy. He was selected with the 3rd pick by the Utah Blaze during the 2005 expansion draft, but never played with the Blaze because he was trying to make the Packers roster. On October 11, 2006, McGill's rights were traded to the Nashville Kats, along with Thal Woods, for Frank Carter. Before the season started McGill was traded to the Storm for Demetrius Bendross.
