= Jason Gesser =

American football player and coach (born 1979)

Biographical details
- Born: May 31, 1979 (age 47); Honolulu, Hawaii, U.S.
- Education: Washington State (2002)

Playing career
- 1999–2002: Washington State
- 2003: Tennessee Titans
- 2005: Calgary Stampeders
- 2006–2008: Utah Blaze
- Position: Quarterback

Coaching career (HC unless noted)
- 2006: Federal Way HS (WA) (QB)
- 2007–2008: Franklin Pierce HS (WA) (OC)
- 2009–2010: Eastside Catholic HS (WA)
- 2011: Idaho (RB)
- 2012: Idaho (OC/QB, interim HC)
- 2013: Wyoming (QB)
- 2022-present: Seton Catholic HS (WA) (OC)

Administrative career (AD unless noted)
- 2014–2018: Washington State (Asst. AD)

Head coaching record
- Overall: 0–4 (college)

Accomplishments and honors

Awards
- Pac-10 Co-Offensive Player of the Year (2002); First-team All-Pac-10 (2002); Second-team All-Pac-10 (2001)

Jason John Gesser (born May 31, 1979) is an American college football former player and assistant athletic director who is currently the offensive coordinator at Seton Catholic High School in Vancouver, Washington. He played quarterback for Washington State Cougars, Utah Blaze of the Arena Football League (AFL), Calgary Stampeders of the Canadian Football League (CFL), and the Tennessee Titans of the National Football League (NFL). After his playing career ended, Gesser went into coaching. In 2012 he was the interim head coach of the Idaho Vandals. From 2014 to 2018 he was the assistant athletic director at Washington State.

== Early life ==
Gesser attended Saint Louis School in Honolulu and played football for Cal Lee. In his junior year he was named to the all-state team and led the Crusaders to a state championship. In his senior year, St. Louis ranked as high as fourth in the national prep poll and won a second straight state title. He was All-West pick by Prep Star and an academic All-American choice by Prep Star. The Crusaders were 24–0 in games Gesser started.

== College career ==
Gesser played college football at Washington State University in Pullman. He is the only player in Cougar history to be elected as captain three consecutive years. Gesser led WSU to two straight 10 win seasons from 2001-2002, and finished seventh in the 2002 Heisman Trophy race. Gesser and USC quarterback Carson Palmer were named Pac-10 Co-Offensive Players of the Year in 2002. The Honolulu native earned First-team All-America honors and finished his Cougar career as a three time All-Pac-10 selection, and a four-time Academic All-Pac-10 honoree. Gesser left WSU owning school records in a number of offensive categories, some which included career starts (34), total yards (9,007), pass attempts (1,118), completions (611), touchdown passes (70), and consecutive games with a touchdown pass (25). During his career, he appeared in 40 games, made 35 starts, led the Pac-10 in passing yards as junior, was the first Cougar to throw for 3,000 yards twice and led WSU to a 2001 Sun Bowl victory and to the 2003 Rose Bowl. He is second, only to Luke Falk, in having the most wins of any quarterback in Washington State University history. He was inducted into the Washington State University Athletics Hall of Fame in 2016, and was also ranked 9th of the top 12 greatest Washington State University football players of All-Time by the Pac-12 Networks.

== Professional career ==
=== Tennessee Titans ===
Gesser was signed by the Tennessee Titans as an undrafted free agent in April 2003. He spent the entire season with the team but did not see any playing time behind Steve McNair, Billy Volek, and Neil O'Donnell. He was released after the 2004 preseason.

=== Calgary Stampeders ===
On May 5, 2005, Gesser was signed by the Calgary Stampeders. He started the season as Henry Burris' backup, but took over the starting role when Burris tore a ligament in his left thumb. He only started two games, both victories, before spraining his ankle. He finished the season completing 23 of 42 passes for 356 yards, four touchdowns and five interceptions.

=== Utah Blaze ===
In 2006 Gesser signed with the AFL's Utah Blaze. He was the backup at the beginning of the season before replacing the injured Joe Germaine. He completed 89 of 145 passes for 1,092 yards, 23 touchdowns, and seven interceptions. After going winless in four starts, he was replaced by Andy Kelly. Gesser saw little playing time behind a healthy Germaine in 2007, completing two of three passes for 28 yards and a touchdown.

== Coaching ==
Gesser said his ultimate goal is coaching at the college level, preferably at Washington State. During the 2006 off-season he was a quarterbacks coach at Federal Way High School in Federal Way, Washington. In 2007, he was offensive coordinator at Parkland's Franklin Pierce High School. He and fellow ex-Cougar Ryan Leaf both campaigned for the position of quarterbacks coach at WSU when it became available after the 2007 season. That job eventually went to Offensive Coordinator Todd Sturdy.

=== Eastside Catholic ===
In the spring of 2009, Gesser was named as the head football coach at Eastside Catholic School in Sammamish, Washington. He succeeded Bill Marsh, who had resigned after ten seasons with the school. Gesser coached the Crusaders for two seasons, then left in 2011 to become a graduate assistant at WSU in Pullman.

=== Idaho ===
Gesser returned to the Palouse in May 2011, then crossed the state border in June and joined the staff at Idaho as running backs coach in neighboring Moscow. He filled the open position left by his successor at Eastside Catholic, Jeremy Thielbar, a former Cougar teammate. Idaho's head coach Robb Akey was the defensive line coach at WSU during Gesser's playing days for the Cougars. In February 2012, Gesser was promoted to offensive coordinator of the Vandals, assisted on offense by another former WSU coach, Mike Levenseller, who was the receivers coach and passing game coordinator. Gesser recruited the Pacific Northwest and Hawaii for Idaho. After only one victory in the first eight games, Akey was fired on October 21 and Gesser was promoted to interim head coach. The Vandals lost their final four games to finish 1–11 for the 2012 season. Paul Petrino was hired as head coach on December 3 and did not retain Gesser on the coaching staff for 2013.

=== Wyoming ===
Gesser was hired as the quarterbacks coach at Wyoming in February 2013, under fourth-year head coach Dave Christensen.

=== Seton Catholic ===
Before the start of the 2022 season, Gesser was hired as the offensive coordinator at Seton Catholic High School. He is still currently coaching and used to coach his son, Kolten, who was the starting quarterback.

== Administrator ==
In 2014, Gesser returned to his alma mater, Washington State, as assistant director of development. In this role, Gesser oversaw the Cougar Athletic Fund. He was also a member of WSU's football radio broadcast team with Bob Robertson, Bud Nameck, and sideline reporter Jessamyn McIntyre.

Following allegations from multiple women of sexual misconduct, Gesser resigned from WSU in September 2018. In December 2018, WSU found that Gesser violated the school's policy against sexual harassment. Gesser did not participate in the investigation, but was also never found guilty of any crime.

== Personal life ==
Gesser is the grandson of Green Bay Packers Hall of Fame member Joseph "Red" Dunn.

In 2018, while employed at WSU, several women accused Gesser is sexual misconduct. WSU conducted an investigation and determined he violated university policy. https://www.dnews.com/local-news-northwest/probe-gesser-violated-wsu-policy49fd13d5

== Head coaching record ==
=== College ===
Year	Team	Overall	Conference	Standing	Bowl/playoffs
Idaho Vandals (Western Athletic Conference) (2012)
2012	Idaho	0–4	0–3	6th	
Idaho:		0–4	0–3		
Total:		0–4			

== See also ==
- List of National Football League and Arena Football League players
