= Jim Ferraro =

American litigation attorney and author

- Born: James Louis Ferraro; March 29, 1957 (age 69); Greenwich, Connecticut, U.S.
- Education: University of Miami (BBA, MA, JD)
- Occupations: Attorney, Sports Agent, Author
- Years active: 1983-present
- Organization: The Ferraro Law Firm
- Known for: The DuPont Trial (1996); Founding Cleveland Gladiators
- Political party: Democratic
- Spouse: Megan Ferraro (m. 2017)
- Children: 5
- Awards: Trial Lawyer of the Year Finalist (1997); Knights of Malta (1999); Ellis Island Medal of Honor (2001)
- Website: www.FerraroLaw.com

James Louis Ferraro (born March 29, 1957) is an American litigation attorney and author best known for representing thousands of blue collar workers in mass tort cases against major chemical companies such as DuPont. In 1996, he successfully prosecuted the first case in American history against a chemical company for causing a birth defect. The following year, Trial Lawyers for Public Justice named Ferraro a finalist for Trial Lawyer of the Year, for his work on the landmark case. In 2017, he wrote a book about his experience with the case titled Blindsided. The book became a bestseller the same year, appearing on the USA Today, Los Angeles Times, and Wall Street Journal bestseller lists.

== Legal career ==
After graduating from law school in 1983, Ferraro worked briefly for a civil litigation defense firm. On May 13, 1985, he opened his own mass tort litigation practice, The Ferraro Law Firm, where he began working to represent blue-collar workers such as workers that had been exposed to asbestos. By 1990 his firm was representing thousands of blue-collar workers. On June 15, 1997, he opened a second law firm, Kelley & Ferraro, along with Michael V. Kelley in Cleveland, Ohio. The two firms combined have handled over 50,000 asbestos cases, as well as nationwide environmental toxic tort cases.

=== Litigation with widow of partner ===
Lynn Arko Kelley, the widow of Ferraro's partner, sued him for $3.5 billion. Little is known about the case due to a gag order imposed by the court.

=== Dupont case ===
In 1996 Ferraro successfully went to trial against DuPont in what was the first case ever prosecuted against a chemical company for causing a birth defect. Seven years later, the Florida Supreme Court affirmed the verdict.

=== Book ===
In 2017, Ferraro released a book, Blindsided: The True Story of One Man's Crusade Against Chemical Giant DuPont for a Boy with No Eyes (Gildan Media). The book discusses the decade long courtroom battle waged in Florida to help bring justice and hope to the family of the young boy born with no eyes.

=== Philanthropy ===
Ferraro donates to a multitude of charities annually. He is on the Board of Directors of the Make-A-Wish Foundation of Southern Florida, the Children's Home Society, United Way of Miami-Dade, the Jackson Memorial Foundation and Miami Project to Cure Paralysis. He is also a member of the University of Miami's Bowman Foster Ashe Society.

For his philanthropy, in 1999 he was inducted to the Order of Saint John Knights of Malta, a worldwide organization dedicated to helping the sick and the poor. Past recipients include six former U.S. Presidents and Nobel Prize winners.

In 2008, he donated $600,000 to the University of Miami Law School to establish The Ferraro Scholarship, an endowed scholarship fund. He is also a member of the University of Miami's Bowman Foster Ashe Society, established in recognition of individuals, families and organizations whose contributions are over $500,000. In 2008, he donated $1 million to the Buoniconti Fund to Cure Paralysis. In 2010, he was chosen as one of the Twelve Good Men by the Ronald McDonald House of Charities of South Florida.

== Near wedding ==
Ferraro left his bride at the altar in January 2008. He declined to say "I do" at the appointed moment. He was to marry Patricia Delinois. The incident caused the 75 guests great surprise. The would be bride's sister called Ferraro a "snake."
