= Hawaiian Islanders =

Arena football team

Logo

General information
- Founded: 2001
- Folded: 2004
- Headquartered: Neal S. Blaisdell Arena in Honolulu, Hawaii
- Colors: Crimson, gold, black

Team history
- Hawaiian Islanders (2002–2004)

Home fields
- Neal S. Blaisdell Arena (2002–2004)

League / conference affiliations
- af2 (2002–2004): Natnional Conference (2002–2004); Western Division (2002–2004)

Championships
- Division championships: 1: 2003

Playoff appearances (1)
- 2003

The Hawaiian Islanders were a minor league team of the Arena Football League's developmental league, the AF2. Based in Honolulu, Hawaii, the Hawaiian Islanders home field was at the Neal S. Blaisdell Center Arena. It competed in the AF2 National Conference West. They were owned by Charles Wang, who also owned the New York Islanders and the AFL's New York Dragons. The Islanders were an affiliate of the Dragons, along with the short-lived New Haven Ninjas. The team existed from 2002 to 2004.

The Islanders were coached by Guy Benjamin and Chad Carlson in 2002. In 2003, they were coached by Cal Lee, who had been coaching high school football at Hawaii's St. Louis School for the past 20 seasons. Fullback Josh White played with the Islanders before playing in the AFL.

The team disbanded after the 2004 season.

During the team's inaugural 2002 season, Oceanic Time Warner Cable carried every home game live on a pay-per-view basis. Kanoa Leahey and Robert Kekaula served as the television announcers.

== Season-by-season ==
Season records
| Season | W | L | T | Finish | Playoff results |
|---|---|---|---|---|---|
| 2002 | 5 | 11 | 0 | 3rd NC Western | — |
| 2003 | 10 | 6 | 0 | 1st NC Western | Won Round 1 Hawaii 57, Wichita 30; Lost Round 2 Tulsa 58, Hawaii 38 |
| 2004 | 8 | 8 | 0 | 2nd NC Western | — |
| Totals | 24 | 26 | 0 | (including playoffs) | |

== See also ==
- The Hawaiians (WFL), a football team in the World Football League from 1974 to 1975
