= Mike Lewis (arena football) =

No. 3, 33, 53
- Position: Defensive end

Personal information
- Born: August 15, 1984 (age 42)
- Listed height: 6 ft 2 in (1.88 m)
- Listed weight: 260 lb (118 kg)

Career information
- College: Adrian College
- NFL draft: 2006: undrafted

Career history
- Albany Conquest (2007–2008); Peoria Pirates (2009); Iowa Barnstormers (2010); Utah Blaze (2011–2012); Iowa Barnstormers (2013–2014); Las Vegas Outlaws (2015); Orlando Predators (2016); Los Angeles KISS (2016)

Awards and highlights
- MIAA Defensive MVP (2005); 3× Second Team All-Arena (2011, 2013, 2014); First Team All-Arena (2012)

Career AFL statistics
- Tackles: 166.5
- Sacks: 60.5
- Forced Fumbles: 22
- Fumble Recoveries: 10
- Interceptions: 2
- Stats at ArenaFan.com

Michael Lewis (born August 15, 1984) is an American former professional football defensive end who played in the Arena Football League (AFL). He was signed by the Albany Conquest as an undrafted free agent in 2007. He played college football at Adrian College.

== College career ==
Lewis starred for the Adrian College Bulldogs football team for four years. He originally went to Adrian to be a running back, but after a position switch, he posted the three best sack seasons by a Bulldog and owns the Adrian record for sacks in a single game (4). His 40.0 career sacks and 61.0 tackles for loss are career records. As a senior in 2005, Lewis was named the Michigan Intercollegiate Athletic Association (MIAA) Defensive MVP.

== Professional career ==
=== Early career ===
Lewis' first year out of college he played semi-pro football before receiving an offer to join the Albany Conquest of Arena Football 2. After two seasons with the Conquest, Lewis joined the Peoria Pirates for the 2009 season.

=== Iowa Barnstormers ===
Lewis moved up to Arena Football 1 with the af2 folded, joining the Iowa Barnstormers.

=== Utah Blaze ===
Lewis moved out west and joined the Utah Blaze in 2011. His sack total earned him 5th place in the league, and earned him a Second Team All-Arena selection. He returned to the Blaze in 2012.

=== Return to Iowa ===
Lewis returned to the Barnstormers in 2013, reuniting him with head coach Mike Hohensee, whom had coached him in Peoria. Lewis continued his great sacking ability, moving up the AFL record books for career sacks.

=== Las Vegas Outlaws ===
Lewis joined the Las Vegas Outlaws in 2015.

=== Orlando Predators ===
On October 16, 2015, Lewis was assigned to the Orlando Predators.

=== Los Angeles KISS ===
On May 24, 2016, Lewis was traded to the Los Angeles KISS for Logan Harrell and John Martinez.
