= Justin Skaggs =

American football player (1979–2007)

- Skaggs with the Utah Blaze.

No. 3, 80
- Position: Wide receiver / Linebacker

Personal information
- Born: April 22, 1979; Wentzville, Missouri
- Died: June 15, 2007 (aged 28); Salt Lake City, Utah
- Listed height: 6 ft 2 in (1.88 m)
- Listed weight: 200 lb (91 kg)

Career information
- High school: St. Clair (Saint Clair, Missouri)
- College: Evangel
- NFL draft: 2001: undrafted

Career history
- Washington Redskins (2001–2002); Amsterdam Admirals (2003); San Francisco 49ers (2003)*; Tampa Bay Buccaneers (2004)*; Orlando Predators (2005); Utah Blaze (2006–2007)
- * Offseason or practice squad member only

Awards and highlights
- Third-team All-HAAC (2000)

Career NFL statistics
- Games played: 1
- Stats at Pro Football Reference

Career AFL statistics
- Receiving yards: 1,221
- Rushing yards: 17
- Total touchdowns: 24
- Forced fumbles–fumbles recovered: 4–1

Justin Earl Skaggs (April 22, 1979 – June 15, 2007) was an American professional football player. He played college football at Evangel University. After going undrafted in the 2001 NFL draft, Skaggs went on to have a seven-year professional football career in the National Football League (NFL), NFL Europe, and Arena Football League (AFL).

In his career, Skaggs played for the Redskins, San Francisco 49ers, and Tampa Bay Buccaneers of the NFL. He also played for the Amsterdam Admirals of NFL Europe and the Orlando Predators, and Utah Blaze of the Arena Football League (AFL). In 2007, he died at the age of 28 from stage III oligodendroglioma, an inoperable brain cancer.

== Early life and college career ==
Born in Wentzville, Missouri, Skaggs attended St. Clair High School in Saint Clair, Missouri. At Evangel University, an NAIA school, Skaggs had 22 receptions for 295 yards and four touchdowns and earned third-team All-Heart of America Athletic Conference honors as a senior in 2000.

== Professional career ==
=== NFL and NFL Europe ===
After going undrafted in the 2001 NFL draft, Skaggs signed with the Washington Redskins in April 2001 and spent the season on the practice squad. He appeared in one game in 2002 before being released on November 13. In 2003, he played in eight games for the Amsterdam Admirals in NFL Europe, with 37 receptions for 401 yards and five touchdowns.

On July 29, 2003, Skaggs signed with the San Francisco 49ers, but he was cut on August 24. In January 2004, Skaggs signed with the Tampa Bay Buccaneers. During training camp, the Buccaneers released Skaggs on August 4, the day after he injured his hamstring.

=== Arena Football League ===
After not being able to stay with a team in the NFL, Skaggs turned to the Arena Football League, where he was signed by the Orlando Predators for the 2005 season. He had 33 receptions for 370 yards with three touchdowns in his first year.

His best season came in 2006, when he moved to the expansion Utah Blaze, becoming one of its inaugural players. For that year, he had 52 receptions for 665 yards and 13 touchdowns. Named the team's Iron Man of the Year, he also had 34 tackles, (eight solo), and three forced fumbles, and one fumble recovery.

Skaggs did well in 2007, with four receiving and four rushing touchdowns, as well as 22 tackles.

== Personal life and death ==
Skaggs was married with two children.

In late May 2007, after having headaches, Skaggs visited a doctor for what he thought was a neck injury. MRIs and CAT scans located several tumors in the left lobe of his brain, and doctors diagnosed him with stage III oligodendroglioma, an inoperable brain cancer, on June 1. In spite of the diagnosis, he showed up for a game three days later against the Colorado Crush. Although he did not play, he inspired his team to an important 51–14 win that kept their playoff hopes alive.

He started suffering extremely severe headaches in the early morning on June 14, and was admitted to University of Utah Hospital in Salt Lake City, where doctors discovered an increase in intracranial pressure. He underwent emergency surgery, but emerged unresponsive and on a ventilator. On June 15, surrounded by family, Skaggs was taken off life support. His funeral, held at EnergySolutions Arena on June 18, was attended by over 300, including AFL Commissioner C. David Baker and Redskins owner Daniel Snyder.

On March 29, 2008, the number 3 was retired by the Blaze in Skaggs' honor.

== See also ==
- List of Arena Football League and National Football League players
- List of gridiron football players who died during their careers
