= James Roe (American football) =

American football player and coach (born 1973)

No. 83, 9
- Position: Wide receiver / Linebacker

Personal information
- Born: August 23, 1973 (age 53); Richmond, Virginia, U.S.
- Listed height: 6 ft 1 in (1.85 m)
- Listed weight: 187 lb (85 kg)

Career information
- High school: Henrico (VA)
- College: Norfolk State
- NFL draft: 1996: 6th round, 186th overall pick

Career history

Playing
- Baltimore Ravens (1996–1998); Chicago Bears (1999)*; San Jose SaberCats (2000–2013); Orlando Rage (2001)
- * Offseason or practice squad member only

Coaching
- Baltimore Brigade (2017–2019) Offensive coordinator

Awards and highlights
- 3× ArenaBowl champion (2002, 2004, 2007); AFL All-Ironman Team (2003, 2004, 2005); Second-team All-Arena (2007)

Career NFL statistics
- Receptions: 15
- Receiving yards: 239
- Receiving touchdowns: 1
- Stats at Pro Football Reference

Career AFL statistics
- Receptions: 916
- Receiving yards: 11,170
- Receiving touchdowns: 281
- Total tackles: 97
- Interceptions: 8
- Stats at ArenaFan.com

James Edward Roe II (born August 23, 1973) is an American former professional football wide receiver who played in the National Football League (NFL) and Arena Football League (AFL). He played for the Baltimore Ravens of the NFL from 1996 to 1998, and the San Jose SaberCats of the AFL from 2000 to 2013. He was the offensive coordinator for the Baltimore Brigade of the AFL from 2017 to 2019.

== Early life ==
Roe attended Henrico High School in Henrico, Virginia where he was an All-State and All-Richmond Metro honoree in football and an All-Richmond Metro honoree in basketball. He was also an All-Capital District honoree in track and field. Roe graduated from Henrico High School in 1991. (Reference VHSL Reference Guide & Richmond-Times Dispatch Archives)

== College career ==
Roe attended Norfolk State University from 1992 to 1995 and was voted All-CIAA three years in row. He remains Norfolk State's all-time leading receiver, and holds three CIAA reception records for career reception yards, career reception touchdowns and single season reception TD.

== Professional career ==
Roe was selected in the sixth round of the 1996 NFL draft by the Ravens. He played for three years for the Baltimore Ravens, and ended his NFL career with 15 receptions for 239 yards (15.93 yards per rec. avg.), and a touchdown.

In twelve Arena Football League seasons with the San Jose SaberCats, Roe caught 916 receptions for 11170 yards and 281 touchdowns. He received All-Ironman Team honors in 2003, 2004, and 2005, and was named Ironman of the Game in San Jose's ArenaBowl XVIII victory. After not starting the 2013 season with the team, Roe re-joined the SaberCats with two weeks remaining in the season.

== Coaching career ==
In 2017, Roe became the offensive coordinator of the Baltimore Brigade.
