= Frank Carter (American football) =

American football player (born 1977)

No. 27, 40
- Positions: Fullback, linebacker

Personal information
- Born: October 17, 1977 (age 49)
- Listed height: 6 ft 1 in (1.85 m)
- Listed weight: 260 lb (118 kg)

Career information
- College: MacMurray College (IL)
- NFL draft: 1999: undrafted

Career history
- Duluth-Superior Lumberjacks (1999); Quad City Steamwheelers (2000–2001); New Jersey/Las Vegas Gladiators (2002–2005); Nashville Kats (2006); Utah Blaze (2007); San Jose SaberCats (2008)

Awards and highlights
- 2× ArenaCup champion (2000, 2001); First-team All-Arena (2005); AFL All-Ironman Team (2006)

Career AFL statistics
- Total tackles: 133.5
- Sacks: 21
- Rushing yards: 475
- Rushing touchdowns: 41
- Receiving touchdowns: 3
- Stats at ArenaFan.com

Frank Carter (born October 17, 1977) is an American former professional football fullback/linebacker who played seven seasons in the Arena Football League (AFL) with the New Jersey/Las Vegas Gladiators, Nashville Kats, Utah Blaze and San Jose SaberCats. He played college football at MacMurray College. He was also a member of the Duluth-Superior Lumberjacks and Quad City Steamwheelers.

== Early life ==
Frank Carter was born on October 17, 1977. He played college football at MacMurray College.

== Professional career ==
Carter played for the Duluth-Superior Lumberjacks of the Indoor Football League in 1999. He played for the Quad City Steamwheelers of the af2 from 2000 to 2001. He signed with the AFL's New Jersey Gladiators on November 16, 2001. Carter played for the team from 2002 to 2005, earning first-team All-Arena in 2005. He was signed by the Nashville Kats of the AFL on October 4, 2005. He played for the Kats during the 2006 season, earning AFL All-Ironman Team recognition. Carter was traded to the Utah Blaze on October 11, 2006, for the rights to Tim McGill and Thal Woods, and played for the Blaze during the 2007 season. He signed with the San Jose SaberCats of the AFL on October 30, 2007, and played for the team during the 2008 season.
