= Cleveland Gladiators =

Arena football team in Ohio, US

Logo

General information
- Founded: 1997
- Folded: 2019
- Headquartered: Quicken Loans Arena in Cleveland, Ohio
- Colors: Red, black, white
- Mascot: Rudi
- ClevelandGladiators.com

Personnel
- Owner: Dan Gilbert
- Head coach: Ron Selesky
- President: Kerry Bubolz

Team history
- New Jersey Red Dogs (1997–2000); New Jersey Gladiators (2001–2002); Las Vegas Gladiators (2003–2007); Cleveland Gladiators (2008–2017)

Home fields
- Continental Airlines Arena (1997–2002); Thomas & Mack Center (2003–2006); Orleans Arena (2007); Quicken Loans Arena (2008–2017)

League / conference affiliations
- Arena Football League (1997–2017): American Conference (2004–2007, 2011–2015); National Conference (1997–2003, 2008–2010, 2016); Western (2004–2008); Midwest Division (2010); Eastern (1997–2003, 2008, 2011–2015)

Championships
- Conference championships: 1: American: 2014
- Division championships: 3: Eastern: 2002, 2011, 2014

Playoff appearances (10)
- 1997, 1998, 2002, 2003, 2008, 2011, 2014, 2015, 2016, 2017

The Cleveland Gladiators were an arena football team based in Cleveland, Ohio, and members of the Arena Football League (AFL). The Gladiators played their home games at Quicken Loans Arena, which they shared with the Cleveland Cavaliers of the National Basketball Association and the Cleveland Monsters of the American Hockey League. The franchise was originally based in East Rutherford, New Jersey, and then later in Las Vegas, Nevada, before relocating to Cleveland for the 2008 AFL season. The Gladiators qualified for the playoffs eight times in their history, reaching the ArenaBowl in 2014.

The Gladiators announced that they would not play the 2018 and 2019 seasons due to renovations on Quicken Loans Arena that required it to close during the NBA offseason and were granted a two-season hiatus. Before the team could return in 2020, the league filed for bankruptcy and ceased operations.

== Team history ==
=== New Jersey Red Dogs (1997–2000) ===
The New Jersey Red Dogs entered the Arena Football League in 1997, along with the Nashville Kats and the New York CityHawks. Their ownership group, which was led by New Jersey radio entrepreneur E. Burke Ross, also included several ex-NFL players, such as Joe Morris, Carl Banks, and Harry Carson. The name "Red Dogs" reflected the sponsorship of the Miller Brewing Company, the makers of Red Dog beer. The Red Dogs played at Continental Airlines Arena in East Rutherford, New Jersey.

The AFL's intention was to add only New Jersey and Nashville for 1997. However, well after the awarding of the Red Dogs and Kats franchises, the owners of Madison Square Garden in New York City requested a franchise of their own, and the league granted this request. And so the CityHawks also began play in 1997. This affected the Red Dogs, in that the league then prevented the Red Dogs from advertising in New York. While North Jersey itself is very populous, the Red Dogs had hoped to be the team for the entire New York metropolitan area. Despite this setback, the Red Dogs management built a good team, which opened its history in memorable fashion. The team won 8 of its first 9 games, including a victory in their inaugural game on a last-second game-winning field goal, an overtime victory against the Albany Firebirds, a thrashing of the Iowa Barnstormers (runners-up in the previous year's ArenaBowl X), and also one game in which they scored a then-record 91 points against the Texas Terror. (This record has since been surpassed by the New York Dragons, who scored 99 in a game against the Carolina Cobras in 2001.)

The Red Dogs were led by head coach John Hufnagel, who had been a quarterback and offensive coordinator for the Calgary Stampeders of the Canadian Football League. After his time with the Red Dogs, Hufnagel went on to be an offensive coach for several National Football League teams, including the New England Patriots and the New York Giants. He then became the head coach of the CFL's Stampeders for the 2008 season, and won the Grey Cup in his first season at the helm. Hufnagel brought in several players with CFL experience to the Red Dogs, including QB Rickey Foggie and offensive specialist Larry Ray Willis. The team's other main receiver was Alvin Ashley, a player whose small size (150 lb.) made him unlikely to play in the NFL but suited the more compact Arena game.

The Red Dogs slumped late in their first season, losing 4 of their final 5 games to finish 9–5, then losing to the Orlando Predators in the first round of the playoffs.

The Red Dogs finished 8–6 in 1998, their second season, and won their first playoff game in Albany against the Firebirds.

Hufnagel left the Red Dogs after the 1998 season for a job with the NFL's Cleveland Browns, and he was replaced by Frank Mattiace, a former defensive lineman for the New Jersey Generals of the USFL. Star Larry Ray Willis was traded to the Milwaukee Mustangs Following those losses, the Red Dogs slumped in 1999 to their first losing season, going 6–8, despite winning 3 of their first 4.

The Red Dogs made a significant trade following the 1999 season, a trade they never got to benefit from. New Jersey sent Alvin Ashley to the Orlando Predators for wide receiver/defensive back Barry Wagner, widely regarded as the greatest player in the league's history. However, soon after the trade, the league and its players agreed to a new collective bargaining agreement that resulted in several veteran players—including Wagner—gaining free agency. Wagner then signed with the San Jose SaberCats.

In 2000, the Red Dogs, without Wagner, Ashley, and offensive mainstay Chad Lindsey, fell to 4–10. Foggie lost his job as starting QB, replaced by Tommy Maddox, at the time a failed NFL quarterback. Head coach Frank Mattiace left the team in mid-season and was replaced on an interim basis by Kevin Guy, a former defensive back/wide receiver who had played two full seasons with the Red Dogs.

=== New Jersey Gladiators (2001–2002) ===
Before the 2001 season, the New Jersey team was sold to Jim Ferraro, a lawyer from Miami, Florida. Ferraro changed the team name to the New Jersey Gladiators. The new ownership appointed as head coach the ex-CityHawk boss Lary Kuharich, who had won ArenaBowl VII in 1993 with the Tampa Bay Storm; and it acquired Connell Maynor from Orlando to be the starting Quarterback. Maynor had led the Predators to victory in ArenaBowl XIV the previous season, and was named the game's MVP. An all-around threat, Maynor had played with the CityHawks under Kuharich in 1997, but took only one snap all season as the backup to Mike Perez. Instead, the CityHawks used Maynor as a wide receiver/linebacker, and one week he even won the award for the league's best "ironman" (player who plays both on offense and defense, as 6 of 8 players used to play both sides of the ball in Arena Football).

The Gladiators reached the lowest ebb in franchise history during the 2001 season, winning only 2 out of 14 games. The club's top receivers attained roughly half the number of yards that Larry Ray Willis had achieved in each of the franchise's first two seasons, and the rushing leader was quarterback Maynor himself.

In 2002, the club had another new coach, Frank Haege, who had been a Red Dog assistant under John Hufnagel. After leaving the Red Dogs, Haege went on to coach the Quad City Steamwheelers of the AFL's minor-league circuit af2. Haege's Quad City team had dominated the af2 for two seasons, winning 31 of 32 regular-season games — including one win by a score of 103–3 — and two championships (Haege was later charged by the AFL with violating the af2 salary cap rules at Quad City, and was fined heavily by the league. Also, the Quad City team was banned from the af2 playoffs in 2002). The Gladiators' new quarterback for 2002 was Jay McDonagh, who had played under Haege. Former Red Dog Alvin Ashley was back with the club, seeing limited duty; however, this time around the main New Jersey receiver was Mike Horacek, who had starred for the Iowa Barnstormers, and who later returned to that franchise to play for the Dragons. The Gladiators' fortunes turned around, and they had their first winning season since 1998, going 9–5 and hosting a playoff game for the first time (a loss to Orlando).

A few weeks before the start of the 2003 season (the first one to begin in February instead of April, and the first one in which the league's games would be televised weekly by NBC), owner Ferraro moved the team to Las Vegas. The AFL schedules for the 2003 season had already been devised; so the Las Vegas Gladiators would play that season in the Eastern Division of the National Conference, before shifting in 2004 to the American Conference's Western Division.

=== Las Vegas Gladiators (2003–2007) ===
The Gladiators relocated to Las Vegas, Nevada, for the 2003 season and played their home games at the Thomas & Mack Center on the campus of the University of Nevada, Las Vegas. This arena was also the home of a previous Arena team, the Las Vegas Sting, in 1994 and 1995. In 2007, in an effort to increase attendance, the Gladiators moved to the Orleans Arena. The move did not have the desired effect; the Gladiators averaged 5,383 fans in 2007, down from 10,115 in 2006.

The Gladiators competed in the Western Division of the AFL's American Conference. The team went 31–50 in five years in Las Vegas, making the playoffs once.

=== Cleveland Gladiators (2008–2017) ===
==== 2008 season ====
On October 16, 2007, it was announced in a press conference that the Gladiators would be relocating to Cleveland, Ohio. This would be the second arena football team to play be in the Cleveland area; the Cleveland Thunderbolts played at the Richfield Coliseum in Richfield, Ohio, for three seasons from 1992 to 1994. Former Cleveland Browns Quarterback Bernie Kosar was announced as the public face of the team, as well as the President of football operations and minority owner. The Gladiators would play their home games at Quicken Loans Arena, the home of the NBA's Cleveland Cavaliers and the AHL's Lake Erie Monsters. The team also moved back to the Eastern Division of the National Conference for the first time since 2003. The team would still be known as the Gladiators and continue to retain the team colors of red, silver, and black.

On March 3, the Gladiators played their inaugural game in Quicken Loans Arena, a 61–49 win over the New York Dragons. Raymond Philyaw, the team's quarterback, was named the offensive player of the game after throwing for five touchdowns. The team's first season in Cleveland was a successful one, as they went on to have a winning record of 9–7. On June 21, the Gladiators clinched a playoff berth with a 47–35 win against the Columbus Destroyers as well as home field advantage for the first round.

Cleveland won its first playoff game in 10 years with a 69–66 win over the Orlando Predators. Raymond Philyaw threw for 436 yards (the second-most yards in AFL postseason history) and eight touchdowns, receiver Robert Redd caught a franchise best 204 yards and four touchdowns, and Brandon Hefflin had two interceptions and recovered a key fumble late in the game to seal the victory. The following week, the Gladiators advanced to their first conference championship game in team history when they beat the Georgia Force in the divisional round 73–70. Raymond Philyaw had eight touchdown passes and Robert Redd and Otis Amey each caught three touchdowns in the win. The 61 points scored by both teams in the second quarter was also an AFL record for combined points in a quarter. The Gladiators then traveled to Philadelphia to face the Soul in the National Conference Championship game. Unfortunately, their season ended one game short of the Arena Bowl with a tough 70–35 loss.

==== 2009: AFL suspends operations ====
The National Conference Championship would be the Gladiators' last game for almost two years. The Arena Football League canceled its 2009 season and it seemed that operations would be suspended indefinitely. However, the league reorganized as Arena Football 1 before purchasing the assets of the Arena Football League, therefore assuming the AFL's history, and the Gladiators were revived for the 2010 season, with owner Jim Ferraro and Bernie Kosar returning as team president and Quicken Loans Arena continuing to act as the team's home field. On December 23, 2009, former Grand Rapids Rampage coach Steve Thonn was named as new head coach of the Gladiators. Soon after, Arena Football 1 decided to re-adopt the Arena Football League name.

==== 2010 season ====
During their first season in two years, the Gladiators hovered around .500 for the majority of the time. Highlights of the season included blowout victories over the Utah Blaze and the Iowa Barnstormers, but there were also some close losses attributed to poor special teams play. On July 17, during their 15th game of the season, the Gladiators were officially eliminated from playoff contention when their division rivals the Milwaukee Iron defeated the Orlando Predators. The Gladiators finished their 2010 campaign with a 7–9 record.

==== 2011 season ====
The Gladiators returned in 2011 with Steve Thonn once again serving as head coach. John Dutton also returned as the team's starting quarterback. The Gladiators started their 2011 campaign successfully, upsetting the Spokane Shock, the defending ArenaBowl Champions, at their own arena. However, this victory was marred by an Achilles' heel injury to John Dutton in the final minutes, which would ultimately sideline him for the season. Fortunately, the team's backup quarterback Kurt Rocco performed well in his first Arena football start as the Gladiators 3–0. In their home opener, wide receiver Troy Bergeron set a Gladiator franchise record with six touchdown catches during the game. Unfortunately, the Gladiators were not able to post their best start in franchise history, losing the next two weeks. Injuries to Rocco during midseason led to third-string quarterback and Cleveland-area Case Western University alum Dan Whalen mounting second half comebacks. However, Rocco would eventually retake the starting position for the rest of the season.

Through 2011, the Gladiators were very strong at home but often mediocre on the road. Though they finished with a 7–1 record at Quicken Loans Arena, they were only 3–6 in away games. But the season ultimately ended with success, as the team beat their newest rival, the Pittsburgh Power, to clinch the American Conference East Division and guarantee a spot in the playoffs. This was the second time in three seasons that Gladiators will enter the playoffs while in Cleveland, as well as the first time they have clinched the East Division.

The team entered the playoffs with a 10–8 record to face the Georgia Force in the first round. Despite playing at home, the Gladiators played poorly in the second half and were eliminated from contention, losing 50–41.

==== 2012 season ====
On January 17, 2012, the Gladiators were sold to Cleveland Cavaliers and Lake Erie Monsters owner Dan Gilbert. With John Dutton back as the starting quarterback, the Gladiators began their 2012 campaign successfully, reaching a record of 6–3 at the midway point of the season. However, the team then went on a five-game losing streak, which included some controversy when on June 8, 2012, the Gladiators lost by forfeit to the Pittsburgh Power. This was the first ever game forfeited in AFL history, due to the Gladiators (representing the AFL players' union) going on strike to protest on-field safety concerns and contract disputes with AFL management. Though the Gladiators would end the streak with a Week 16 win against division rival Milwaukee, two more losses against Orlando and Utah officially eliminated the team from playoff contention. The Gladiators finished the 2012 season at 8–10, second place in the East Division.

==== 2013 season ====
The Gladiators' 2012–2013 offseason saw the departure of veteran quarterback John Dutton, who had been with the team for the past three seasons. The team's fifth season in Cleveland was a struggle, as the Gladiators never were able to have any long sustained success over the course of the year, finishing at 4-14 (tied with Pittsburgh for the worst record in the entire Arena League).

==== 2014 season ====
The Gladiators began the 2014 season winning their first nine games, more than doubling their entire win total from the previous season (four). They didn't lose a game until being defeated by the Pittsburgh Power 48–34 on May 31 – more than two months into the season. On Saturday June 7, 2014, the Gladiators set a team record for points scored in a game when they defeated the Iowa Barnstormers 86–49. On July 12, 2014, following their 50–47 overtime win over the San Antonio Talons, the Gladiators clinched the East Division Championship, and the #1 seed in the American Conference for the 2014 playoffs. On July 26, 2014, the Gladiators set an AFL record for wins in a single season by going 17–1 after defeating the Tampa Bay Storm, 56–49. This gave the Gladiators home field advantage throughout the 2014 AFL playoffs. On August 2, 2014, the Gladiators defeated the Philadelphia Soul, 39–37, on a last second field goal by Aaron Pettrey in the first round of the AFL playoffs to advance to the American Conference finals. On August 10, 2014, the Gladiators defeated the Orlando Predators 56–46 to win the American Conference Championship, and advance to the ArenaBowl for the first time in franchise history. In ArenaBowl XXVII, the Gladiators were defeated by the Arizona Rattlers, 72–32.

==== 2015 season ====
The Gladiators opened the 2015 season by winning their first two games; however, on April 11 in an ArenaBowl XXVII rematch, the Gladiators lost to the Arizona Rattlers 49–41 in their home opener. Overall, the Gladiators were not able to replicate the success of 2014, finishing with a regular season record of 8–10, second in the East Division. This overall record did qualify for the 2015 AFL playoffs, drawing the East Division Champion Philadelphia Soul in the first round. The Gladiators' season ended on August 15 when they lost to Philadelphia 47–35 in the first round of the AFL playoffs.

==== 2016 season ====
For the 2016 season, the AFL featured eight teams, due to a number of teams either folding or moving to other indoor football leagues. As part of the restructuring, the Gladiators were moved from the American to the National Conference, so as to give each conference four teams. They finished the regular season at 7–9, third place in the National Conference.

In the first round of the AFL playoffs, the Gladiators rallied and defeated the Los Angeles KISS 56–52 after trailing the bulk of the game. The Gladiators then lost to the Arizona Rattlers 82–41 in the National Conference championship game, ending their season.

==== 2017 season ====
In 2017, the AFL was reduced from eight teams down to five, due to teams folding or transferring to other leagues. With only five teams, the AFL essentially played a round-robin style 14 game schedule, with the top four teams at the end of the season advancing to the playoffs. The Gladiators finished at 5–9, clinching third place and a playoff spot. Cleveland would go on to lose to the #2 seed Tampa Bay Storm 73–59 in the AFL semifinals to end their season.

==== Suspension of operations: 2017 ====
In September 2017, it was announced that Quicken Loans Arena would be undergoing significant renovations during the 2018 and 2019 basketball offseason so as not to conflict with its primary tenant, the NBA's Cleveland Cavaliers. However, as the AFL season runs into the basketball offseason, the Gladiators had to take a two-year leave of absence beginning in November 2017 with hopes to return for the 2020 season.

When the renovations were completed, the league suspended all city-based team operations for at least the 2020 season putting the Gladiators' plans on hold. The AFL filed for bankruptcy November 27, 2019, and ceased operations.

== Notable players ==
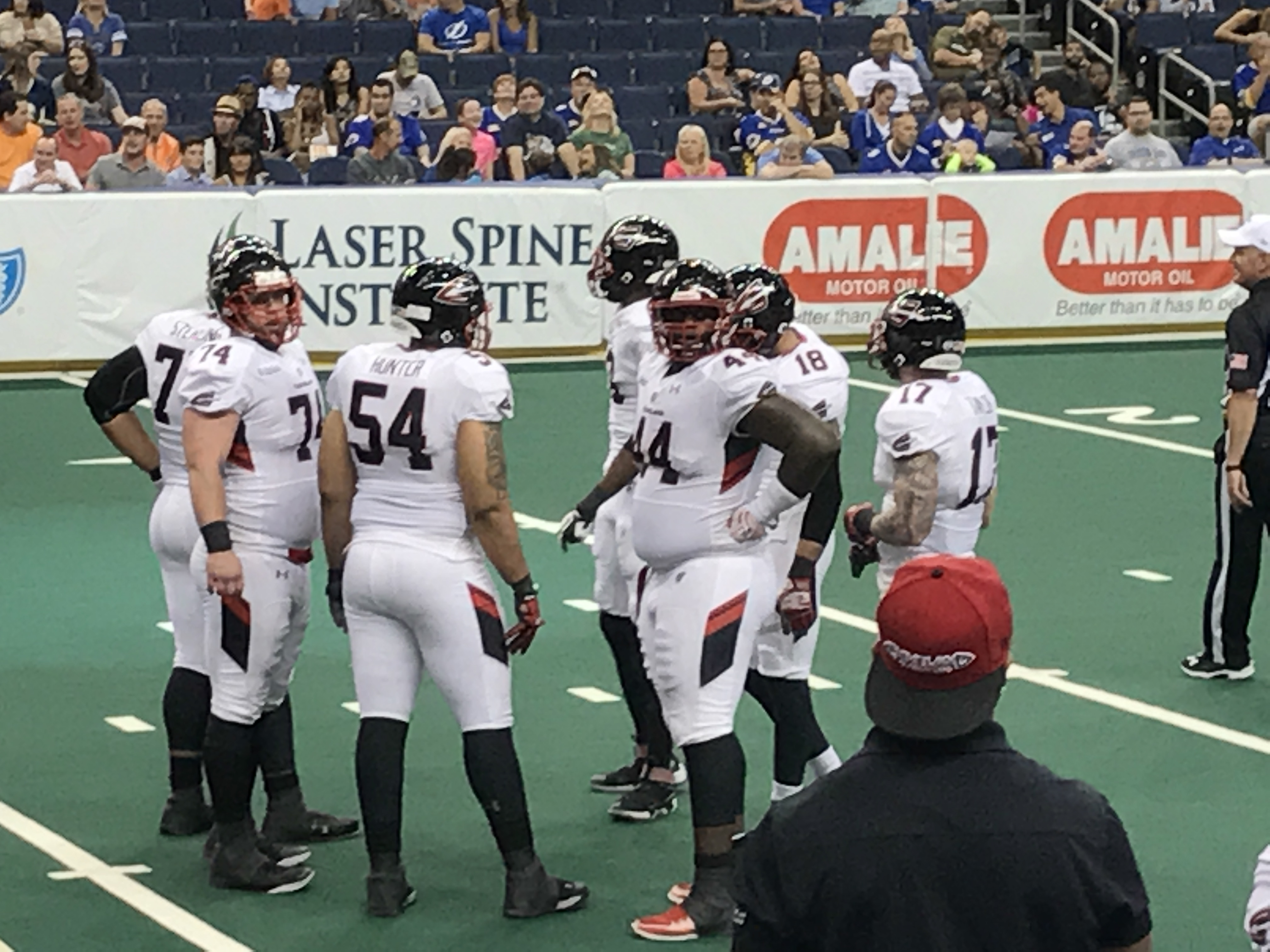
The Gladiators in 2017

=== Arena Football League Hall of Famers ===
Cleveland Gladiators Hall of Famers
No.	Name	Year Inducted	Position(s)	Years w/ Gladiators
13	Clint Dolezel	2012	QB	2004–2005
--	George LaFrance	2011	OS	2000
--	Stevie Thomas	2012	WR/LB	2001

=== Individual awards ===
AFL Offensive Player of the Year
Season	Player	Position
2004	Marcus Nash	OS

Lineman of the Year
Season	Player	Position
1999	Robert Stewart	OL/DL

Kicker Player of the Year
Season	Player	Position
1997	Steve Videtich	K
2002	Steve Videtich	K

HERO Award
Season	Player	Position
1999	Latish Kinsler	DS
2012	John Dutton	QB

AFL Rookie of the Year
Season	Player	Position
2016	Marvin Ross	DB

=== All-Arena players ===
The following Red Dogs/Gladiators players have been named to All-Arena Teams:

- QB Shane Austin
- FB Marlion Jackson
- FB/LB Frank Carter
- WR/DB Alvin Ashley (2)
- WR Otis Amey, Ben Nelson, Dominick Goodman (2), Collin Taylor
- OS Marcus Nash
- OL Adam Tadisch, Shannon Breen, Joe Madsen, D. J. Brandel
- OL/DL Robert Stewart (3)
- DL Anthony Hoke, Willie McGinnis (2), Randy Colling
- LB Tim Cheatwood
- DB Marrio Norman, Marvin Ross
- DS Damon Mason
- K Steve Videtich (4)
- KR Larry Beavers

=== All-Ironman players ===
The following Red Dogs/Gladiators players have been named to All-Ironman Teams:

- WR/DB Alvin Ashley (1)
- DS/KR Adrian Lunsford (1)

=== All-Rookie players ===
The following Red Dogs/Gladiators players have been named to All-Rookie Teams:

- FB/LB Jermaine Younger
- WR/DB Dimitrious Stanley, David Saunders, Dennison Robinson
- OS Michael Lewis

== Head coaches ==
Head coach	Tenure	Regular season record (W–L)	Postseason record (W–L)
John Hufnagel	1997–1998	17–11	1–2
Frank Mattiace	1999–2000	9–15	0–0
Kevin Guy	2000	1–3	0–0
Lary Kuharich	2001	2–12	0–0
Frank Haege	2002–2004	25–21	0–2
Ron James	2005–2006	13–18	0–0
Danton Barto	2007	2–14	0–0
Mike Wilpolt	2008	9–7	2–1 (2008 AFL Coach of the Year)
Steve Thonn	2010–2016	61–61*	3–4 (2014 AFL Coach of the Year)
Ron Selesky	2017	5–9	0–1

(*) One loss occurred via forfeit

== Front office/Coaching staff ==
Cleveland Gladiators staff
Front office: Dan Gilbert (Majority Owner); Len Komoroski (CEO); Kerry Bubolz (President of business operations); Mike Ostrowski (VP of Minor League Operations)	Head coach: Ron Selesky; Assistant coaches: Dominic Jones (assistant head coach, director of football operations); Siaha Burley (offensive coordinator, assistant director of player personnel); Chad Schofield (offensive line coach, football outreach and community ambassador); Clay Harrell (defensive line coach & strength and conditioning coach)

== Media ==
WKRK-FM was the team's radio home. Tony Brown serves as play-by-play announcer, while WKRK-FM personality Dustin Fox serves as color analyst for home games. Select home games also aired on regional sports network Spectrum Sports (Ohio), during which the feed is simulcast on the radio. WHBC host Kenny Roda served as field reporter for televised games.

== Season-by-season records ==
- Note: The Finish, Wins, and Losses columns list regular season results and exclude any postseason play. This list documents the season–by–season records of the Gladiators' franchise from 1997 to present, including postseason records, and league awards for individual players or head coaches.

ArenaBowl champions	ArenaBowl appearance	Division champions	Playoff berth

Season	League	Conference	Division	Regular season			Postseason results	Awards
Season	League	Conference	Division	Finish	Wins	Losses	Postseason results	Awards
New Jersey Red Dogs
1997	AFL	National	Eastern	2nd	9	5	Lost Quarterfinals (Orlando) 45–37	Steve Videtich (Kicker of the Year)
1998	AFL	National	Eastern	2nd	8	6	Won Quarterfinals (Albany) 66–59; Lost Semifinals (Tampa Bay) 49–23	
1999	AFL	National	Eastern	2nd	6	8		Robert Stewart (Lineman of the Year); Latish Kinsler (HERO Award)
2000	AFL	National	Eastern	4th	4	10		
New Jersey Gladiators
2001	AFL	National	Eastern	4th	2	12		
2002	AFL	National	Eastern	1st	9	5	Lost Quarterfinals (Orlando) 49–46	Steve Videtich (Kicker of the Year)
Las Vegas Gladiators
2003	AFL	National	Eastern	3rd	8	8	Lost Wild Card Round (Arizona) 69–23	
2004	AFL	American	Western	4th	8	8		Marcus Nash (Offensive Player of the Year)
2005	AFL	American	Western	3rd	8	8		
2006	AFL	American	Western	4th	5	11		
2007	AFL	American	Western	5th	2	14		
Cleveland Gladiators
2008	AFL	National	Eastern	3rd	9	7	Won Wild Card Round (Orlando) 69–66; Won Divisional Round (Georgia) 73–70; Lost Conference Championship (Philadelphia) 70–35	
2009	The league suspended operations for the 2009 AFL season.							
2010	AFL	National	Midwest	3rd	7	9		
2011	AFL	American	East	1st	10	8	Lost Conference Semifinals (Georgia) 50–41	
2012	AFL	American	East	2nd	8	10		John Dutton (Al Lucas AFL Hero Jason Foundation Award)
2013	AFL	American	East	2nd	4	14		
2014	AFL	American	East	1st	17	1	Won Conference Semifinals (Philadelphia) 39–37; Won Conference Championship (Orlando) 56–46; Lost ArenaBowl XXVII (Arizona) 32–72	
2015	AFL	American	East	2nd	8	10	Lost Conference Semifinals (Philadelphia) 28–55	
2016	AFL	National	-	3rd	7	9	Won Conference Semifinals (Los Angeles) 56-52; Lost Conference Championship (Arizona) 41-82	Marvin Ross (Rookie of the Year)
2017	AFL	–	–	4th	5	9	Lost Semifinals (Tampa Bay) 59-73	
Total					144	172	(includes only regular season)	
Total					6	10	(includes only the postseason)	
Total					150	182	(includes both regular season and postseason)	

== Mascot and in-game entertainment ==
The Gladiators' mascot was a Trojan warrior dressed lion character named "Rudi", and the team also features cheerleaders known as the "Goddesses".
