= Orshawante Bryant =

American football player (born 1978)

No. 4
- Position: Wide receiver / Defensive back

Personal information
- Born: November 16, 1978 (age 47); Riverside, California, U.S.
- Listed height: 6 ft 0 in (1.83 m)
- Listed weight: 185 lb (84 kg)

Career information
- High school: Rubidoux (Riverside)
- College: Portland State (1996–2000)
- NFL draft: 2001: undrafted

Career history
- Arizona Rattlers (2001–2005); Utah Blaze (2006–2007); Utah Saints (2008)

Career AFL statistics
- Receptions: 288
- Receiving yards: 3,568
- Interceptions: 13
- Total TDs: 58
- Stats at ArenaFan.com

Orshawante Bryant (born November 16, 1978) is an American former professional football wide receiver who played six seasons in the Arena Football League (AFL) with the Arizona Rattlers and Utah Blaze. He played college football at Portland State University.

== Early life and college ==
Orshawante Bryant was born on November 16, 1978. He attended Rubidoux High School in Riverside, California.

Bryant played college football for the Portland State Vikings of Portland State University. He was redshirted in 1996 and was a four-year letterman from 1997 to 2000. He set school career records in receptions with 223 and receiving yards with 3,449. Bryant earned All-Big Sky Conference honors three times. He was inducted into Portland State's athletics hall of fame in 2010.

== Professional career ==
=== Arizona Rattlers ===
Bryant went undrafted in the 2001 NFL draft. He was signed to the practice squad of the Arizona Rattlers of the Arena Football League (AFL) on July 19, 2001. He became a free agent after the 2001 season and re-signed with the Rattlers on December 4, 2001.

Bryant played in all 14 games, starting three, for the Rattlers in 2002, recording 36 receptions for 392 yards and seven touchdowns, 27 solo tackles, 12 assisted tackles, one interception, seven pass breakups, one fumble recovery, 11 kick returns for 225 yards, and two completions on two passing attempts for 31 yards and one touchdown. He was a wide receiver/defensive back during his time in the AFL as the league played under ironman rules. The Rattlers finished the 2002 season with an 11–3 record and advanced to ArenaBowl XVI, where they lost to the San Jose SaberCats by a score of 52–14.

Bryant re-signed with Arizona on January 10, 2003. He appeared in 13 games, starting six, in 2003, totaling 59 catches for 834 yards and 18 touchdowns, ten solo tackles, five assisted tackles, one interception, two pass breakups, and 30 kick returns for 610 yards. The Rattlers finished the year 10–6 and advanced to the ArenaBowl for the second consecutive season, this time losing to the Tampa Bay Storm in ArenaBowl XVII.

Bryant appeared in all 16 games for the Rattlers during the 2004 season, catching 42 passes for 493 yards and five touchdowns while also posting 29 solo tackles, 15 assisted tackles, three interceptions, and four pass breakups. Bryant and the Rattlers went 11–5, and advanced to the team's straight straight ArenaBowl appearance. The Rattlers lost ArenaBowl XVIII to the San Jose SaberCats.

Bryant was placed on injured reserve on January 21, 2005. He was later activated on March 25, 2005. Overall, he played in eight games in 2005, totaling 37 receptions for 477 yards and nine touchdowns, 21 solo tackles, ten assisted tackles, one interception, and one pass breakup.

=== Utah Blaze ===
Bryant signed with the expansion Utah Blaze of the AFL on October 20, 2005. He appeared in all 16 games during the 2006 season, posting 90 receptions for 1,039 yards and 11 touchdowns, 51 solo tackles, 14 assisted tackles, two interceptions, five pass breakups, and one forced fumble. The Blaze finished 7–9 and lost to Bryant's former team, the Rattlers, in the Wildcard round of the playoffs.

Bryant was placed on injured reserve on February 7, 2007, activated on February 10, placed on injured reserve again on April 25, and activated again on June 22, 2007. Overall, he appeared in nine games during the 2007 season, catching 24 passes for 333 yards and five touchdowns while also recording 22 solo tackles, 13 assisted tackles, five interceptions for 29 yards and one touchdown, two pass breakups, and one fumble recovery. Bryant signed a three year-contract with the Blaze on August 15, 2007.

On February 8, 2008, Bryant ruptured his left Achilles tendon during the second day of training camp. He was placed on injured reserve the next day.

=== Utah Saints ===
Bryant later played for the Utah Saints of the American Indoor Football Association during the 2008 season.
