= Sale' Key =

American football player (born 1981)

No. 10
- Positions: Wide receiver, linebacker

Personal information
- Born: November 3, 1981 (age 45); Independence, Missouri, U.S.
- Listed height: 6 ft 4 in (1.93 m)
- Listed weight: 215 lb (98 kg)

Career information
- High school: Mesa Verde (Citrus Heights, California)
- College: Idaho State
- NFL draft: 2005: undrafted

Career history
- Cincinnati Bengals (2005)*; Memphis Xplorers (2005); Utah Blaze (2006); New Orleans VooDoo (2008); Tulsa Talons (2010)*; Jacksonville Sharks (2010–2011); San Antonio Talons (2012–2013)
- * Offseason or practice squad member only

Awards and highlights
- ArenaBowl champion (2011); ArenaCup champion (2005)

Career AFL statistics
- Receptions: 151
- Yards: 1,648
- Touchdowns: 28
- Tackles: 25
- Interceptions: 1
- Stats at ArenaFan.com

Sale' Key (born November 3, 1981) is an American former professional football player. He played college football as a wide receiver for the Idaho State Bengals. He was signed as an undrafted free agent by the Cincinnati Bengals in 2005.

== Professional career ==
=== Jacksonville Sharks ===
Key played for the Jacksonville Sharks in 2010 and 2011. The Sharks won ArenaBowl XXIV in 2011.

=== San Antonio Talons ===
Key was assigned to the San Antonio Talons during the 2012 season. In the month of April, Key missed 3 weeks with an injury.

Key returned to the Talons in 2013. He was reassigned by the Talons on July 11, 2013.
