= Cal Lee =

American football player and coach (born 1946)

Current position
- Title: Defensive coordinator
- Team: Saint Louis School (HI)
- Conference: ILH D1

Biographical details
- Born: October 20, 1946 (age 80); Honolulu, Hawaii

Playing career
- 1966–1970: Willamette
- Position: Linebacker

Coaching career (HC unless noted)
- 1970: Willamette (GA)
- 1972: Saint Louis School (HI)
- 1973–1979: Kaiser HS (HI) (DC)
- 1982–2001: Saint Louis School (HI)
- 2003: Hawaiian Islanders
- 2004–2007: Hawaii (LB)
- 2008–2009: Hawaii (DC)
- 2009–2011: Hawaii (LB)
- 2012–2014: Kalani HS (HI) (DC)
- 2014–2019: Saint Louis School (HI)
- 2020–present: Saint Louis School (HI) (DC)

Administrative career (AD unless noted)
- 2002: Saint Louis School (HI)

Head coaching record
- Overall: 296–41–5 (high school)

Accomplishments and honors

Championships
- 14 HHSAA State Championships; 17 ILH Division I Titles

Awards
- NFHS Football Coach of the Year (2000)

Cal Lee (born October 20, 1946) is an American former football coach who was most recently the defensive coordinator at Saint Louis School in Honolulu as of June 2023. A former assistant head coach for the University of Hawaii football team, Lee was a successful high school football coach prior to joining the staff at the University of Hawaii in 2003.

== High school coaching career ==
Known as one of the nation's most successful high school coaches, Lee led the St. Louis Crusaders to 14 Prep Bowl titles, 18 Interscholastic League of Honolulu championships, and the inaugural HHSAA State Championship in 1999. In his 21 seasons with the Crusaders, Lee compiled a 241–32–5 record. During his tenure as head coach at Saint Louis, Lee was instrumental in introducing the run and shoot offense to the state of Hawaii.

Lee's success at Saint Louis also includes a 55-game win streak that spanned over six seasons (1985–1990) and a 15–1–1 record against out-of-state teams. The two-time national coach of the year is the most prolific coach in the history of Hawaii prep football. Lee's success as a coach trickled down to his players as well. He coached numerous players who went on to play at the NCAA Division I, including all-time NCAA passing leader Timmy Chang and Olin Kreutz, Dominic Raiola, Chris Fuamatu-Maʻafala, who each went on to play professionally in the National Football League (NFL). He resigned the head coaching position to become athletic director for the school in 2002, and left the school in 2003 to coach the Hawaii Islanders arena football team.

Before becoming the head coach at Saint Louis, Lee served as the defense coordinator for Kaiser High School from 1973 to 1979. In 1979, Kaiser won the Prep Bowl, which was the mythical state championship for Hawaii.

In January 2012, Lee was named the new defensive coordinator at Kalani High School. Lee's brother, Ron, is the current offensive coordinator of the Falcons.

Lee was once again named the head coach at Saint Louis in 2014, taking over a Crusaders team that had suffered two losing seasons. He stepped down from his head coaching position at Saint Louis in 2020 with his brother Ron succeeding him as head coach, but would remain with the program as defensive coordinator until the end of the 2022-2023 season.

== Arena Football 2 coaching career ==
In 2003, Lee accepted the job as head coach of Hawaii's first arena football team, the Hawaiian Islanders of the af2. The Islanders secured a playoff berth and posted a 12–6 record in his first season. Lee would coach the team again in 2004 before the team eventually disbanded in the offseason.

== College coaching career ==
Before becoming the linebackers coach for the University of Hawaii in 2003, Lee had previously been an assistant coach for his alma mater, Willamette University, where he had garnered All-American honors as a linebacker. Lee was the offensive line coach at Willamette during 1970. He returned in 1978 as the linebacker coach before heading back to Hawaii to coach prep football. In 2008, he became University of Hawaii's defensive coordinator.

Lee again coached alongside his brother Ron, who served as the offensive coordinator and wide receiver coach for the University of Hawaii under Greg McMackin until his retirement in 2011.
