= Craig Kobel =

American gridiron football player (born 1982)

No. 51
- Position: Linebacker

Personal information
- Born: January 26, 1982 (age 44); Lake Worth, Florida, U.S.
- Listed height: 6 ft 2 in (1.88 m)
- Listed weight: 265 lb (120 kg)

Career information
- College: South Florida
- NFL draft: 2006: undrafted

Career history
- Utah Blaze (2006); Cologne Centurions (2007); Philadelphia Eagles (2007)*; Philadelphia Soul (2008); New York Jets (2009)*; Hartford Colonials (2010)*
- * Offseason or practice squad member only

Awards and highlights
- ArenaBowl champion (2008)
- Stats at ArenaFan.com

Craig Kobel (born January 26, 1982) is an American former football linebacker. He was signed by the Utah Blaze as a free agent in 2006. He played college football at South Florida.

Kobel was also a member of the Cologne Centurions, Philadelphia Eagles, Philadelphia Soul, New York Jets, and Hartford Colonials

== Early life ==
Kobel attended Santaluces High School in Latana, Florida and was a student and a letterman in football, wrestling, and baseball. In football, he was a two-time All-Area selection.

== College career ==
At South Florida, Kobel tied Kawika Mitchell's single season record for most tackles for loss with 19, in 2003.

In 2004, Kobel recorded a team leading six sacks. Kobel also scored one touchdown.

== Professional career ==
=== Tampa Bay Buccaneers ===
On August 29, 2005, Kobel participated in a rookie mini-camp on a try-out contract with the Tampa Bay Buccaneers.

=== Utah Blaze ===
In 2006 Kobel played offensive line and defensive line for the Utah Blaze of the Arena Football League. In 2006 Kobel rushed one time, for a one-yard touchdown. He also had 6.5 tackles.

=== Philadelphia Eagles ===
On January 23, 2007 Kobel was signed by the Philadelphia Eagles. Later the same day he was allocated to NFL Europa. In NFL Europa Kobel played for the Cologne Centurions.

Kobel was limited in the pre-season action by a sports hernia and underwent season-ending surgery. Kobel reached an injury settlement with the Eagles and was waived by the Philadelphia Eagles on August 28, 2007.

=== Team Florida (AAFL) ===
Kobel signed a contract as a draft pick with Team Florida of the All-American Football League.

=== New York Jets ===
Kobel signed with the New York Jets on June 9, 2009. He was waived on August 30.
