= Red Dog (beer) =

American beer brand

- Manufacturer: Miller Brewing Company
- Introduced: 1994; 32 years ago
- Alcohol by volume: 4.8%
- Style: American-style lager
- Original gravity: (°Plato): 1.040- 1.046 (10- 11.5 °Plato) typical of this style
- Final gravity: (°Plato): 1.006 - 1.010 (1.5 - 2.5 °Plato) typical of this style
- IBU scale: (5 - 17) typical of this style

Red Dog was a beer produced by the Miller Brewing Company and was part of their Plank Road Brewery Family. The beer contains 4.8% alcohol by volume. It was introduced in 1994 and ended production at the start of 2021.

== History ==
Red Dog was introduced in 1994 and was brewed with two barley malts and five varieties of American hops. "Plank Road Brewery" was the name of Frederick Miller's first brewhouse in the 19th century. The Plank Road name was resurrected in the 1990s to sell Icehouse and Red Dog as a more premium beer under a different name, so as not to directly associate them with Miller Brewing. Using the tag line "Be Your Own Dog," Tommy Lee Jones was hired to voice Red Dog TV commercials in the ad campaign from the creative team of Michael McLaughlin and Stephen Creet at BBDO, Toronto. Although popular during the mid-to-late 1990s, Red Dog faded into near-obscurity after the turn of the 21st century. It was found in stores at a price segment between Miller High Life and Milwaukee's Best. At the end of February 2021, Molson Coors ended production of Red Dog beer.

== Advertising ==
During the mid-1990s, Red Dog was a prominent sponsor in motorsport, serving as the primary sponsor for driver Kenny Wallace in the NASCAR Busch Series from 1994 to 1996. For its television advertising, the brand used the slogan "Be your own dog" in a series of popular commercials that featured a live bulldog whose inner monologue was voiced by Academy Award-winning actor Tommy Lee Jones. The distinct bulldog logo also became the subject of a widespread 1990s urban legend, with consumers claiming that viewing the logo upside down revealed a hidden, sexually explicit image of Batman.
