= Steve Videtich =

American football player (born 1971)

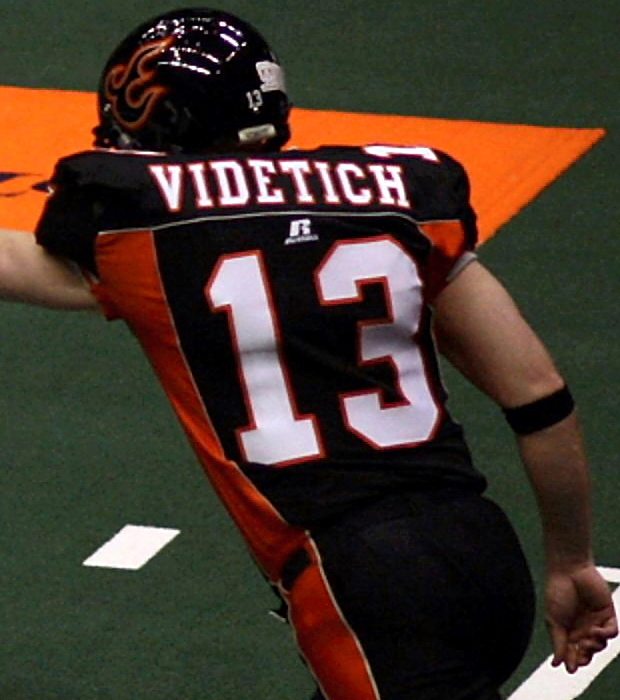
- Videtich with the Utah Blaze in 2006

No. 13
- Position: Placekicker

Personal information
- Born: November 4, 1971 (age 55)
- Listed height: 6 ft 2 in (1.88 m)
- Listed weight: 185 lb (84 kg)

Career information
- College: NC State (1991–1994)
- NFL draft: 1995: undrafted

Career history
- Florida Bobcats (1996); New Jersey Red Dogs (1997–1999); Milwaukee Mustangs (2000); New Jersey/Las Vegas Gladiators (2001–2003); Columbus Destroyers (2004–2005); Utah Blaze (2006–2008)

Awards and highlights
- 2× First-team All-Arena (1997, 2002); 3× Second-team All-Arena (1998, 2000, 2003); 2× AFL Kicker of the Year (1997, 2002)
- Stats at ArenaFan.com

Steve Videtich (born November 4, 1971) is an American former professional football placekicker who played in the Arena Football League (AFL) for the Florida Bobcats, New Jersey Red Dogs/New Jersey Gladiators/Las Vegas Gladiators, Milwaukee Mustangs, and Columbus Destroyers. He was also the general manager of the AFL's Utah Blaze.

== Early life ==
Videtich attended Ledford Senior High School in Thomasville, North Carolina and was a student and a letterman in football, soccer, and golf. He was a four-time soccer MVP in high school on a team coached by his father, Tom.

== College career ==
Videtich played college football for North Carolina State and was one of the nation's most accurate kickers over his last two collegiate seasons (1993–1994), connecting on 28-of-31 field goals. He finished his collegiate career second in the Wolfpack record books in field goal percentage. Videtich was named Second-Team All-American at NC State in 1994 and his team was All-ACC in 1993 and 1994. He majored in industrial engineering.

== Professional career ==
=== 1996 ===
Videtich began his career in the AFL with the Florida Bobcats. He also went to training camp with the Washington Redskins of the National Football League in 1996.

=== 1997–1999 ===
Videtich played two seasons for the New Jersey Red Dogs. In 1997, Videtich was named Kicker of Year for setting a league record by converting 60 consecutive extra-point attempts; a streak that extended into the 1998 season; the streak would reach 62 before being snapped.

=== 2000 ===
He played one season for the Milwaukee Mustangs.

=== 2001–2003 ===
While playing for the New Jersey/Las Vegas Gladiators, Videtich was named Second-Team All-Arena in 2003.

=== 2004–2005 ===
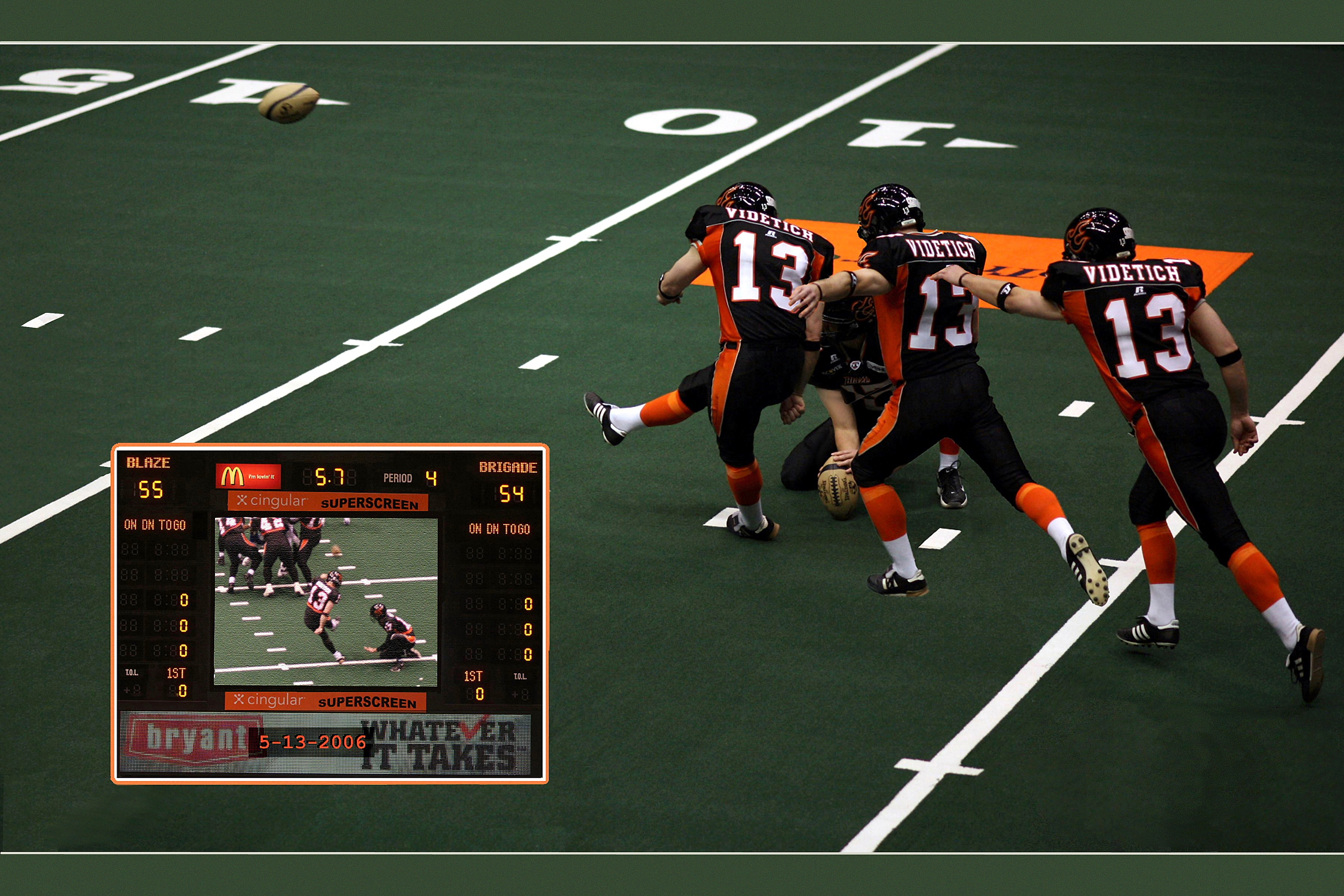
Videtich won the game with this kick on May 13, 2006; there was not enough time left for the Brigade to recover.

Videtich played for the Columbus Destroyers where he connected on 14-of-28 field goal attempts and 92-of-99 extra point attempts, including one by drop kick (which was worth two points as per AFL rules). Videtich ranked third in the league among kickers with 134 points scored that season. He is one of only two kickers (Brian Mitchell being the other) to have ever scored points with the drop kick in the AFL.

=== 2006 ===
Videtich joined the Blaze for their inaugural season. During the season, Videtich became the all-time leader in kicking points with 1,381 career points, while setting two new expansion marks for PATs attempted (113) and made (106).

=== 2007 ===
Videtich played in all 16 games for the Blaze where he connected on 10-of-19 field goal attempts and 113-of-127 PATs.

=== 2008 ===
Videtich was released March 5 after missing a game-winning field goal against the Arizona Rattlers
