= Danny White =

American football player and coach (born 1952)

No. 11
- Positions: Quarterback, punter

Personal information
- Born: February 9, 1952 (age 74); Mesa, Arizona, U.S.
- Listed height: 6 ft 2 in (1.88 m)
- Listed weight: 193 lb (88 kg)

Career information
- High school: Westwood (Mesa)
- College: Arizona State (1971–1973)
- NFL draft: 1974: 3rd round, 53rd overall pick

Career history

Playing
- Memphis Southmen (1974–1975); Dallas Cowboys (1976–1988)

Coaching
- Arizona Rattlers (1992–2004) Head coach; Utah Blaze (2006–2008) Head coach

Awards and highlights
- As a player: Super Bowl champion (XII); Second-team All-Pro (1982); Pro Bowl (1982); All-WFL (1975); WFL All-Time Team; First-team All-American (1973); WAC Offensive Player of the Year (1973); Arizona State Sun Devils No. 11 retired; As a coach: 2× ArenaBowl champion (1994, 1997); AFL Coach of the Year Award (1993)

Career NFL statistics
- Passing attempts: 2,950
- Passing completions: 1,761
- Completion percentage: 59.7%
- TD–INT: 155–132
- Passing yards: 21,959
- Passer rating: 81.7
- Punting yards: 24,509
- Punting average: 40.2
- Stats at Pro Football Reference

Head coaching record
- Regular season: 142–82 (.634)
- Postseason: 20–13 (.606)
- Career: 162–95 (.630)
- College Football Hall of Fame

Wilford Daniel White (born February 9, 1952) is an American former professional football player who was a quarterback and punter for 13 seasons with the Dallas Cowboys of the National Football League (NFL). He was the third major franchise quarterback in Cowboys history, following Roger Staubach and Don Meredith. White was 62–30 as a starter, was a second team All-Pro selection in 1982, and led the Cowboys to five playoff appearances, with three consecutive appearances in the NFC Championship game from 1980 to 1982. White was also among the last Cowboys quarterbacks in the Tom Landry era, alongside 1988 starter Steve Pelluer.

Upon his retirement, White coached in the Arena Football League (AFL). He has been the color commentator for Cowboys games on Compass Media Networks' America's Team Radio Network since the 2011 season. He played college football for the Arizona State Sun Devils.

== Early life ==
A graduate of Westwood High School in Mesa, Arizona, White did not receive a lot of notice while being the starter at quarterback, due to his perception as a better baseball prospect.

Frank Kush, then the football head coach at Arizona State University, helped convince Bobby Winkles, the school's baseball coach, to sign White to a scholarship with the provision that he would also play punter for the football team. During those early years Kush gave him a chance to improve his skills as a quarterback, which eventually would lead him to become the starter midway through his sophomore season, ending up throwing for six touchdowns in a game against the University of New Mexico.

White went on to have a stellar career as a quarterback and punter, compiling a 32–4 record, winning three Fiesta Bowls, setting seven NCAA passing records and being named an All-American in 1973, when he led the nation's second rated total offense. He finished with 6,717 passing yards, 64 touchdowns, 42 interceptions and averaged 41.7 yards per punt.

Besides having his jersey retired, he was inducted into the College Football Hall of Fame, the State of Arizona Sports Hall of Fame, and the Arizona State University Athletics Hall of Fame. In 2000, he was named Arizona Athlete of the Century by the Arizona Republic. He also was an inaugural member of Dunham and Miller Hall of Fame.

On October 29, 2010, White was honored, along with other Sun Devil Quarterbacks, at a Legends Luncheon hosted by the Arizona State University Alumni Association and Sun Devil Club. Other honorees included John F. Goodman, Andrew Walter, and Jake Plummer.

== Professional career ==
=== Memphis Southmen ===
The Dallas Cowboys selected him in the third round (53rd overall) of the 1974 NFL draft. The Cowboys were mainly interested in him as a punter, so he chose to sign with the World Football League's Memphis Southmen for a better offer.

White shared the quarterback position with John Huarte, helping his team reach the semifinals as a rookie and a second-place finish in 1975. During these two years, he passed for 2,635 yards and 21 touchdowns in 30 games, and also led the league in punting his last year.

=== Dallas Cowboys ===
In 1976, White signed with the Dallas Cowboys after the World Football League folded. Through 1979, he was the Cowboys' punter and the backup to the team's star quarterback Roger Staubach. After Staubach's retirement following the end of that season, White became the Cowboys' starting quarterback. Until 1984, he continued to serve as the team's punter, making him one of the last starting quarterbacks in NFL history to also start at a different position. He punted for the last time in his career once in 1985.

In a memorable 1980 divisional-round playoff game against the Atlanta Falcons, White led the Cowboys to a come-from-behind 30–27 victory. He also played in one of the Cowboys' most painful playoff losses against the San Francisco 49ers in the 1981 NFC Championship Game, famous for the Joe Montana-to-Dwight Clark game-winning play, which would simply come to be known as "The Catch". White threw for 173 yards, 2 TDs and 1 INT, and his passer rating in the game was actually higher than Montana's, 98.1 vs. 81.4. He received Pro Bowl and second-team All-Pro honors in 1982.

White led the Cowboys to three consecutive NFC Championship Games (1980–1982). The Cowboys were favored to win all three games even though they played on the road against the NFC's top seeded team in each game—even, oddly, in 1982 when the Cowboys' and Redskins' regular season records were 6–3 and 8–1 respectively. White received criticism, some unfairly, after the Cowboys lost all three games. White was criticized during the 1982 NFL players strike by teammate Tony Dorsett for crossing the picket line citing financial reasons, though Dorsett himself was criticized for crossing the picket line with his own financial concerns soon after. Fans and teammates alike began to show support for him to be replaced as the Cowboys quarterback by Gary Hogeboom, who had thrown two touchdowns in the NFC Championship Game (which they lost to the archrival Washington Redskins) after White was knocked out of the game with a concussion. Even his statistically career-best 1983 season failed to silence the critics, after ending it with consecutive blowout losses to the Redskins (at home) and the 49ers after a 12–2 start. To add insult to injury, the Cowboys lost the wildcard playoff game to the Los Angeles Rams. That apparently was enough for him to lose his starting job to Hogeboom at the start of the 1984 season. Under Hogeboom, the Cowboys looked impressive with a 4–1 start, but then a loss to division rival St. Louis and ineffective plays by Hogeboom convinced coach Tom Landry to reinstate White as his starter. The Cowboys finished 9–7, but missed the playoffs in 1984 for the first time in a decade; but with White as quarterback, the Cowboys made it back in 1985 with a 10–6 record. However, they lost again to the Los Angeles Rams in the divisional playoffs.

In 1986, the Cowboys started 6–2, had the #1 offense in the NFL, were tied for the lead in the NFC Eastern Division and White was also the number one rated passer in the NFC at that point in the season. During an away game against Bill Parcells's New York Giants, however, a blind-side sack by Giants linebacker Carl Banks broke White's throwing wrist and tore ligaments, knocking him out of the game and ending his season. Dallas lost the game, 17–14, and without him the team faded badly, finishing the year 7–9 and the Cowboys' first losing season since 1965.

White returned as the starter at the beginning of 1987, but after inconsistent play, he was benched in favor of Steve Pelluer for 4 of the final 6 games. In 1988, Pelluer won the starting job in training camp, relegating White as a backup. White appeared briefly in only two games, and in his second game he suffered a season-ending knee injury. An option on his contract was not picked up in April 1989 and he announced his retirement on July 12, 1989, paving the way for the recently drafted Troy Aikman to take the reins of the by-then struggling franchise.

White had 1,761 completions on 2,950 attempts for 21,959 yards, 155 touchdowns, and 132 interceptions in his career. He also gained 482 yards and scored 8 touchdowns rushing. Unusual for a quarterback, he had two pass receptions for touchdowns, both from a halfback option pass. On special teams he punted 610 times for 24,509 yards, an average of 40.4 yards per punt, with 144 punts inside the 20 and 77 touchbacks. His record as the Cowboys' starting quarterback was 62–30 (.659 winning percentage) during the regular season, and 5–5 in the playoffs.

Being Roger Staubach's successor and never reaching a Super Bowl as a starting quarterback contributed to White's being an unappreciated player, even considering all of the successes he achieved for the Cowboys and the NFL during the decade of the eighties. "I don't think anybody could have followed Roger and done as well as Danny", Coach Tom Landry remarked, "Danny was a solid winner."

== NFL career statistics ==
Legend
	Won the Super Bowl
**Bold**	Career high

=== Regular season ===
Year	Team	Games			Passing						Rushing				Punting				
Year	Team	GP	GS	Record	Comp	Att	Yds	TD	Int	Rtg	Att	Yds	Avg	TD	Att	Yds	Lng	Avg	Blk
1976	DAL	14	0	–	13	20	213	2	2	94.4	6	17	2.8	0	70	2,690	54	38.4	**2**
1977	DAL	14	0	–	4	10	35	0	1	10.4	1	−2.0	−2.0	0	80	3,171	57	39.6	1
1978	DAL	16	1	1–0	20	34	215	0	1	65.2	5	7	1.4	0	76	3,076	56	40.5	1
1979	DAL	16	0	–	19	39	267	1	2	58.4	1	25	**25.0**	0	76	3,168	**73**	41.7	0
1980	DAL	16	16	**12–4**	260	436	3,287	28	**25**	80.7	27	**114**	4.2	1	71	2,903	58	40.9	0
1981	DAL	16	15	11–4	223	391	3,098	22	13	87.5	**38**	104	2.7	0	79	**3,222**	60	40.8	0
1982	DAL	9	9	6–3	156	247	2,079	16	12	91.1	17	91	5.4	0	37	1,542	56	41.7	0
1983	DAL	16	16	**12–4**	**334**	**533**	**3,980**	**29**	23	85.6	18	31	1.7	**4**	38	1,543	50	40.6	1
1984	DAL	14	6	3–3	126	233	1,580	11	11	71.5	6	21	3.5	0	**82**	3,151	54	38.4	0
1985	DAL	14	14	10–4	267	450	3,157	21	17	80.6	22	44	2.0	1	1	43	43	**43.0**	0
1986	DAL	7	6	4–2	95	153	1,157	12	5	**97.9**	8	16	2.0	1	—	—	—	—	—
1987	DAL	11	9	3–6	215	362	2,617	12	17	73.2	10	14	1.4	1	—	—	—	—	—
1988	DAL	3	0	–	29	42	274	1	3	65.0	0	0	0	0	—	—	—	—	—
Career		166	92	62–30	1,761	2,950	21,259	155	132	81.7	156	482	3.0	8	610	24,509	73	40.2	5

== Coaching career ==
White's career as a coach began shortly after his playing days ended. This is appropriate considering that, while an active player, he was widely regarded—like Staubach before him—as knowledgeable of the game and as something of a coach on the field. He also began working as a broadcast commentator during his coaching career, which was possible because he coached Arena football, which is played during the outdoor game's off-season.

White served as the head coach of the Arizona Rattlers from 1992 to 2004, winning the ArenaBowl championship in 1994 and 1997. White's contract was not renewed by the new Rattlers ownership after the 2004 season following three consecutive ArenaBowl losses. He was named the head coach of the Arena Football League expansion Utah Blaze, which began play in 2006. He led his teams to the playoffs in 10 of 11 seasons, including two championships (1994 and 1997), finishing with a 162–95 record as a head coach.

In 2002, he was inducted into the Arena Football League Hall of Fame in recognition for his coaching success.

=== Head coaching record ===
Team	Year	Regular season				Postseason			
Team	Year	Won	Lost	Win %	Finish	Won	Lost	Win %	Result
ARI	1992	4	6	.400	3rd in AFL Western Division	—	—	—	—
ARI	1993	7	5	.583	2nd in AFL American Conference	1	1	.500	Lost to Detroit Drive in Semifinals
ARI	1994	8	4	.667	2nd in AFL American Conference	3	0	1.000	Won ArenaBowl VIII
ARI	1995	7	5	.583	2nd in AFL Western Division	0	1	.000	Lost to Iowa Barnstormers in Quarterfinals
ARI	1996	11	3	.786	1st in AFL Western Division	1	1	.500	Lost to Tampa Bay Storm in Semifinals
ARI	1997	12	2	.857	1st in AFL Western Division	3	0	1.000	Won ArenaBowl XI
ARI	1998	10	4	.714	1st in AFL Western Division	1	1	.500	Lost to Orlando Predators in Semifinals
ARI	1999	10	4	.714	1st in AFL Western Division	1	1	.500	Lost to Albany Firebirds in Semifinals
ARI	2000	12	2	.857	2nd in AFL Western Division	2	1	.667	Lost to Orlando Predators in Semifinals
ARI	2001	8	6	.571	2nd in AFL Western Division	1	1	.500	Lost to San Jose SaberCats in Quarterfinals
ARI	2002	11	3	.786	2nd in AFL Western Division	2	1	.667	Lost to San Jose SaberCats in ArenaBowl XVI
ARI	2003	10	6	.625	3rd in AFL Western Division	3	1	.750	Lost to Tampa Bay Storm in ArenaBowl XVII
ARI	2004	11	5	.688	1st in AFL Western Division	2	1	.667	Lost to San Jose SaberCats in ArenaBowl XVIII
ARI total		121	65	.651		20	10	.667	
UTA	2006	7	9	.438	3rd in AFL Western Division	0	1	.000	Lost to Arizona Rattlers in Wild Card Round
UTA	2007	8	8	.500	3rd in AFL Western Division	0	1	.000	Lost to Los Angeles Avengers in Wild Card Round
UTA	2008	6	10	.375	3rd in AFL Western Division	0	1	.000	Lost to Colorado Crush in Wild Card Round
UTA total		21	27	.438		0	3	.000	
Total		142	82	.634		20	13	.606	

== Personal life ==
White's father, Wilford "Whizzer" White (no relation to Byron White, who also was nicknamed "Whizzer" and played American football), was the first Arizona State University All-American football player and still ranks third in school history with 1,502 rushing yards in a season (1950), he also played halfback for the Chicago Bears from 1951 to 1952.

In 1983, White briefly recorded as a country music artist for the Grand Prix label. His only single, "You're a Part of Me", a duet with Linda Nail, reached #85 on the Hot Country Songs charts.

White and his wife, JoLynn, have four children, Ryan (d. 2015), Geoff, Heather and Reed, and sixteen grandchildren. He now makes corporate appearances and motivational speeches. JoLynn died on August 15, 2016. White is currently married to Linda L. Bang. In recent years he has been seen on TV doing ADT security infomercials.

White is a member of the Church of Jesus Christ of Latter-day Saints.

== See also ==
- List of NCAA major college football yearly passing leaders
