= Bryan Henderson =

American football player (born 1978)

Profile
- Position: Defensive lineman

Personal information
- Born: April 11, 1978 (age 48)
- Listed height: 6 ft 3 in (1.91 m)
- Listed weight: 300 lb (136 kg)

Career information
- College: Northwestern Oklahoma State

Career history
- Arizona Rattlers (2003–2004); Austin Wranglers (2005); Utah Blaze (2006); Kansas City Brigade (2006); Grand Rapids Rampage (2007); Columbus Destroyers (2008)

Awards and highlights
- First-team All-Arena (2004); All-Rookie Team (2003)

Career AFL statistics
- Tackles: 61
- Sacks: 16.5
- Forced fumbles: 6
- Fumble recoveries: 5
- Interceptions: 1
- Stats at ArenaFan.com

Bryan Henderson (born April 11, 1978) is an American former football defensive lineman who played six seasons in the Arena Football League (AFL) with the Arizona Rattlers, Austin Wranglers, Utah Blaze, Kansas City Brigade, Grand Rapids Rampage and Columbus Destroyers. He first enrolled at Los Angeles Valley College before transferring to Northwestern Oklahoma State University.

== Early life and college ==
Henderson was born on April 11, 1978.

Henderson first played college football for the Los Angeles Valley College Monarchs, earning First Team Juco All-America honors in 1999. He transferred to play for the Northwestern Oklahoma State Rangers, earning First Team All-Conference recognition in 2000.

== Professional career ==
Henderson signed with the Arizona Rattlers of the AFL on December 5, 2002, and played for the team from 2003 to 2004. He garnered First Team All-Arena recognition in 2004 and All-Rookie Team honors in 2003. He was signed by the AFL's Austin Wranglers on October 26, 2004, and played for the team during the 2005 season. Henderson was traded to the Utah Blaze for Delbert Cowsette on October 5, 2005, and played for the team during the 2006 season. He was traded to the Kansas City Brigade for Aaron Hamilton and Matt Walls on March 22, 2006. He was released by the team on January 29, 2007. Henderson signed with the Grand Rapids Rampage of the AFL on March 29, 2007, and played for the team during the 2007 season. He was signed by the Columbus Destroyers of the AFL on April 29, 2008. He was released by the Destroyers on May 22, 2008.
