= Seton Catholic College Preparatory High School =

Location
- 9000 NE 64th Avenue; Vancouver, Washington 98665; United States
- 47°4′39″N 122°45′51″W

Information
- Type: Private
- Motto: Omnia Possumus in Christo (All Things Are Possible in Christ)
- Religious affiliation: Roman Catholic
- Established: 2009
- Oversight: Roman Catholic Archdiocese of Seattle
- Principal: Robert Rusk
- Grades: 9–12
- Gender: Co-educational
- Colors: Navy and gold
- Athletics conference: 1A Trico
- Mascot: Sebastian
- Nickname: Cougs
- Team name: Cougars
- Website: www.setonhigh.org

Seton Catholic College Preparatory High School is a Catholic high school within the Roman Catholic Archdiocese of Seattle in Vancouver, Washington, United States. The school is named after Elizabeth Ann Seton, the first native-born citizen of the United States to be canonized by the Roman Catholic Church.

== History ==
Seton opened in 2009 with 30 Ninth graders and 11 tenth graders. It was the first Catholic high school in southwest Washington in 43 years. In Seton's second year, they had 84 students in three classes, Freshmen, Sophomore, and Junior. The third year, they had 119, with Freshmen, Sophomores, Juniors, and Seniors attending.

Seton was housed in a leased building, with no gymnasium or athletic fields, until 2016 when it opened a new school building on land it owned.
