= Ernest Grant (American football) =

American football player (born 1976)

No. 97, 72
- Position: Defensive tackle

Personal information
- Born: May 17, 1976 (age 50); Atlanta, Georgia, U.S.

Career information
- High school: Forest Park (Forest Park, Georgia)
- College: Arkansas–Pine Bluff (1996–1999)
- NFL draft: 2000: 6th round, 167th overall pick

Career history
- Miami Dolphins (2000–2001); Chicago Bears (2002); Georgia Force (2005); Utah Blaze (2006–2007)

Career NFL statistics
- Tackles: 35
- Sacks: 0.5
- Stats at Pro Football Reference
- Stats at ArenaFan.com

Ernest Jouoa Grant (born May 17, 1976) is an American former professional football player who was a defensive tackle of the National Football League (NFL) and Arena Football League (AFL). He played college football for the Arkansas–Pine Bluff Golden Lions and was selected by the Miami Dolphins in the sixth round of the 2000 NFL draft.

Grant was also a member of the Chicago Bears, Georgia Force and Utah Blaze.
