= Emmett White =

American football player (born 1979)

Profile
- Position: Running back

Personal information
- Born: October 6, 1979 (age 47); Ogden, Utah, U.S.
- Listed height: 6 ft 0 in (1.83 m)
- Listed weight: 205 lb (93 kg)

Career information
- High school: Ben Lomond (Ogden, UT)
- College: Utah State (1998–2001)

Emmet White (born October 6, 1979) is a former American football running back for the Utah State Aggies from 1998 to 2001. White was born and raised in Ogden, Utah, and attended Ben Lomond High School. While playing for Utah State, he had two season in which he gained over 1,000 rushing yards, tallying 1,322 yard in 2000 and 1,361 yards in 2001. As a junior in 2000, he led the country with an average of 238.9 all-purpose yards per game; his average was also the sixth highest in NCAA history at that time. On November 4, 2000, in a victory over New Mexico State, White also broke an NCAA single-game record with 578 all-purpose yards and also set a new Utah State single-game record with 332 rushing yards. He concluded his college career with 2,791 rushing yards, 1,044 receiving yards, and 32 touchdowns. He also played professional football in 2002 for the BC Lions of the Canadian Football League. He appeared in two games for the Lions, tallying 30 rushing yards, 76 yards on kickoff returns, and 17 yards on punt returns.
