= Siaha Burley =

American football player and coach (born 1977)

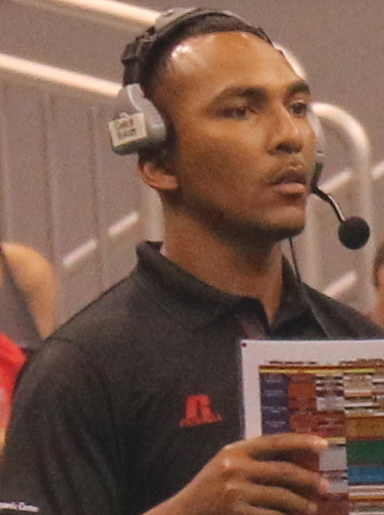
- Burley with the Orlando Predators in 2015

No. 5, 9
- Position: Wide receiver

Personal information
- Born: July 16, 1977 (age 49); Mesa, Arizona, U.S.
- Listed height: 5 ft 10 in (1.78 m)
- Listed weight: 185 lb (84 kg)

Career information
- High school: Westwood (Mesa)
- College: UCF
- NFL draft: 1999: undrafted

Career history

Playing
- Orlando Rage (2001)*; Orlando Predators (2001); Dallas Cowboys (2001)*; Orlando Predators (2002); Los Angeles Avengers (2003); Arizona Rattlers (2004–2005); Minnesota Vikings (2005)*; Utah Blaze (2006–2007); Arizona Rattlers (2008, 2010, 2012)
- * Offseason or practice squad member only

Coaching
- Arizona Rattlers (2011) Wide receivers; Chicago Rush (2013) Offensive coordinator; Orlando Predators (2014–2015) Offensive coordinator; Arizona Rattlers (2016) Offensive coordinator; Cleveland Gladiators (2017) Offensive coordinator; Jacksonville Sharks (2017–2019, 2022) Head coach; Arizona Rattlers (2023–2024) Assistant head coach; Northern Arizona Wranglers (2025–present) Offensive coordinator

Awards and highlights
- First-team All-Arena (2007); 2× Second-team All-Arena (2005, 2006); AFL Offensive Player of the Year (2007); 2× NAL champion (2017, 2019); AFL All-Rookie Team (2001); AFL Assistant Coach of the Year (2015)

Career AFL statistics
- Receptions: 843
- Receiving yards: 10,810
- Rec. touchdowns: 247
- Kickoff/Missed FG returns: 302
- Kick return yards–TDs: 5,712–7
- Stats at ArenaFan.com

Siaha Burley (born July 16, 1977) is an American former professional football wide receiver who played in the Arena Football League (AFL). He played college football at UCF. He was the head coach of the Jacksonville Sharks from 2017 to 2019 and in 2022.

== Early life ==
Burley attended Westwood High School in Mesa and was a letterman in football, basketball, and track. In football, as a senior, he was an All-City and an All-State selection as a wide receiver and as a defensive back.

== College career ==
Before Burley transferred from Mesa Community College to the University of Central Florida where he played football, he played in the Arizona Football League. While at UCF, he led the team in receiving for two straight years. He also led the team in punt returns. His college quarterback was National Football League quarterback Daunte Culpepper.

== Professional career ==
In October 2000, Burley was a territorial selection of the Orlando Rage in the 2001 XFL draft. He was waived by the Rage in 2001 after suffering a hamstring injury during training camp. He then played in 13 games for the Orlando Predators of the Arena Football League (AFL) during the 2001 AFL season. Following the 2001 season, he was named to the AFL All-Rookie team. Burley signed with the Dallas Cowboys on August 14, 2001, but was later released on September 2, 2001.

Burley returned to the Predators in 2002, Burley spent his first two AFL seasons with the Orlando Predators. In 2003, Burley played just one season for the Los Angeles Avengers recording nine touchdowns. In 2004 and 2005, Burley played for the Arizona Rattlers for two seasons. In 2005, the Arena Football League's Writers Association named Burley the Offensive Player of the Year. He set a franchise record with 45 touchdown receptions for the season and was named to the All-Arena Second Team. He was signed by the Minnesota Vikings on July 21, 2005, but later released on August 29, 2005.

In 2006, Burley played for the Utah Blaze where he started all 16 games. He ended the season ranked first in the league with an average of 120.9 receiving yards per game and second in the league for touchdown catches (44) and average receptions per game (8.5). He set expansion team records in total receiving yards (1,934), receptions (136) and receiving touchdowns (44). He was also named to the All-Arena Second Team for the second consecutive year. In 2007, Burley had a record-setting year with the Blaze, breaking league records for receptions (166) and receiving yards (2,129) and was named Offensive Player of the Year for the second time in his career. He also finished second in the league with 49 touchdown receptions and averaged 12.8 yards per catch. He averaged 24.6 yards on kickoff returns. He returned to Arizona in 2008, where he recorded 114 receptions for 1,386 yards, and 33 touchdowns. He also carried the ball once for a loss of eight yards. On defense, he recorded two tackles and returned one kickoff three yards. After the season, on November 10, 2008, he was released by the Rattlers. The AFL folded after the 2008 season.

Burley returned to the newly-formed AFL in 2010, and was assigned to the Rattlers on May 5, 2010. He was placed on reassigment on May 17, 2010, assigned again on August 3, 2010. After a year out of football, he was assigned to the Rattlers again on April 16, 2012. Burley was placed on injured reserve again on May 4, 2012. He was placed on reassignment on June 14, 2012.

== Coaching career ==
Burley became the wide receivers coach for the Arizona Rattlers in 2011 under head coach Kevin Guy. In 2013, Burley was named the offensive coordinator for the Chicago Rush. In 2014, Burley was named the offensive coordinator for the Orlando Predators. After two seasons with the Predators, Burley was named the offensive coordinator for the Rattlers on December 2, 2015. After the Rattlers left the AFL for the Indoor Football League (IFL), Burley joined the Cleveland Gladiators in the same position for the 2017 season.

On May 23, 2017, Burley left the Gladiators early in the 2017 season to become the head coach of the Jacksonville Sharks, a team that had left the AFL to start the new National Arena League. He won two championships with the Sharks before leaving the team after the 2019 season when they could not come to terms on a contract extension. He was re-hired by the Sharks as head coach for the 2022 season.

Burley was the assistant head coach of the Arizona Rattlers of the IFL from 2023 to 2024. He became the offensive coordinator of the IFL's Northern Arizona Wranglers in 2025.

== Personal ==
Burley has three daughters, Sia Jonet N’lae, and Saniyah. He has three brothers, Solomon, LaRue and Nigel.
