= Utah Blaze =

Arena football team

Logo

General information
- Founded: 2006
- Folded: 2013
- Headquartered: EnergySolutions Arena in Salt Lake City
- Colors: Black, orange, white
- Mascot: Torch

Personnel
- Owners: Logan Hunter; Kim Brown; Ron James; Isaac Jacobson
- Head coach: Ron James

Team history
- Utah Blaze (2006–2008, 2010–2013); Utah Valley Thunder (2009)

Home fields
- EnergySolutions Arena (2006–2008, 2011–2013); McKay Events Center (2009); Maverik Center (2010)

League / conference affiliations
- Arena Football League (2006–2008, 2010–2013): National Conference (2006–2008, 2010–2013); West Division (2006–2008, 2010–2013); American Indoor Football Association (2009): West Division (2009)

Playoff appearances (5)
- 2006, 2007, 2008, 2009, 2012

The Utah Blaze was a professional arena football team based in Salt Lake City, Utah and competed in the West Division of the Arena Football League. Home games were played at the EnergySolutions Arena. In 2013, the team did not submit proper documentation to remain in the AFL and the entire roster was reassigned to other teams in the league.

== History ==
=== The original Utah Blaze (2006–08) ===
In September 2004, Commissioner C. David Baker announced that Salt Lake City, Utah was awarded an Arena Football League (AFL) franchise for the 2006 season. The Utah Blaze began play on January 28, 2006, on the road against the San Jose SaberCats. The team was coached by longtime Arizona Rattlers coach Danny White and played its home games at the EnergySolutions Arena in Salt Lake City, home of the National Basketball Association's Utah Jazz. The team was operated by team President Jason Jones and owned by automobile businessmen John Garff, Robert Garff, and Brett Hopkins.

In their first season, the Blaze had the highest average attendance in the Arena Football League, with 15,498 fans per game. They narrowly edged out Philadelphia's 15,463. Prior to the 2006 season, the Blaze had said EnergySolutions Arena held 13,000 fans due to poor sight lines in most of the building. After 16,705 people attended the home opener, that figure was changed to near 15,000. The Blaze topped that figure 5 of the 8 games their first season.

The offense was led by quarterback Joe Germaine and star wide receiver Siaha Burley. On Saturday, February 11, 2006, the Blaze lost to the New York Dragons 84–81 in the second highest scoring game in the history of the Arena Football League. The Blaze's performance was also the second highest score for a losing team in the AFL's 20-year history.

Despite a losing record of 7–9, the Blaze got into the playoffs as an AC Wildcard (the conference's No. 6 seed). Unfortunately, the newly formed Blaze were given the boot as they lost to the Arizona Rattlers with a final score of 57–34.

In 2007, Burley set league records for most receptions (166) and receiving yards (2,129) in a single season, and also finished with 49 touchdown receptions, second in the league that year. For his efforts, he was named the Arena League's Offensive Player of the Year. Germaine continued his strong play at QB, passing for 5,033 yards. The team finished with a record of 8-8, and lost to the Los Angeles Avengers 64-42 in the wildcard playoff game.

The team's mascot was a dalmatian named "Chief". The Blaze were winners of the league"Commissioners Award" in 2006 and won the "Support Staff of the Year Award" in back-to-back seasons (2006–2007), an award that goes to the league's best training and equipment staff, which was headed by Hagen Featherstone and Kevin Seamans in the inaugural season and Kevin Seamans and Darin Featherstone in 2007.

During the 2008 season the Blaze became the first, and only, professional football team to record three 1,500-yard receivers in the same season, with Huey Whittaker, J.J. McKelvey, and Aaron Boone. This also marks the first time three players each caught 120 or more passes in the same season.

Name	Rec	Yards	TDs
Huey Whittaker	126	1,541	32
J. J. McKelvey	121	1,529	38
Aaron Boone	135	1,527	23

Upon the AFL's suspension of operations, the Blaze did so for the same time period.

=== AFL folding and AIFA (2009) ===
The second Utah Blaze organization was originally the Utah Valley Thunder, a member of the American Indoor Football Association during the 2009 season. During their lone season in the AIFA, they were based in Orem, Utah, and played their home games at the McKay Events Center. They finished at a respectable 11–3, finishing second in the Western Division and qualifying for a playoff berth before losing to the Wyoming Cavalry in the Western Divisional playoff.

=== AFL revival and return of the Blaze (2010–2013) ===
On September 28, 2009, the Thunder announced their intention to join Arena Football 1 for the 2010 season and beyond, also announcing relocation to the E Center (now Maverik Center) in West Valley City. Over two months later, on December 8, AF1 was awarded the original AFL's assets after they submitted the highest bid in a bankruptcy court auction. Current AF1 teams were given the right to adopt the former AFL teams' identities, but initially, Utah chose to brand as the "Utah Thunder." The Blaze's previous owner attempted to claim the Blaze logo as his own, but was unsuccessful in doing so. Finally, on January 26, 2010, the team announced it would indeed be using the Blaze name and logo. Less than a month later, the AF1 announced it was going back to the former Arena Football League moniker.

On January 25, 2011, the team announced in a press release that they would be moving back to the EnergySolutions Arena.

Quarterback Tommy Grady set the single season touchdown record throwing his 118th against the Georgia Force, on June 23, 2012. The Blaze also clinched their first winning season in franchise history during the 2012 season.

For the 2012 season the Blaze's defensive line was coined "Sack Lake City" due to their tremendous amount of pressure and quarterback sacks. In a game against the Iowa Barnstormers the Blaze recorded a league record 11 sacks in one game. Led by the combination of Caesar Rayford and Mike Lewis with 3.5 sacks each. In 2 seasons with the Utah Blaze the pair have recorded 3 All Pro Honors, along with 40 sacks combined.

In March 2013, Co-Owner Kristin Murdock sold her majority ownership share of the team to Salt Lake City businesswoman, Kim Brown.

In September 2013, the Arena Football League announced that the Utah Blaze had not submitted paperwork to the league committing for both the 2014 and 2015 seasons. As a result, the Blaze (along with the Chicago Rush) were removed from the league, with Commissioner Jerry Kurz stating, "We fully expect both Chicago and Utah to return to become members of the AFL family again in the near future".

=== Season-by-season ===
ArenaBowl champions	ArenaBowl appearance	Division champions	Playoff berth

Season	League	Conference	Division	Regular season			Postseason results
Season	League	Conference	Division	Finish	Wins	Losses	Postseason results
Utah Blaze
2006	AFL	American	Western	3rd	7	9	Lost Wild Card Round (Arizona) 34–57
2007	AFL	American	Western	3rd	8	8	Lost Wild Card Round (Los Angeles) 42–64
2008	AFL	American	Western	3rd	6	10	Lost Wild Card Round (Colorado) 44–49
2009	AIFA	---	West	2nd	11	3	Lost Western Division (Wyoming) 31–43
2010	AFL	National	West	3rd	2	14	
2011	AFL	National	West	3rd	9	9	
2012	AFL	National	West	3rd	12	6	Won Conference Semifinals (San Antonio) 35–34; Lost Conference Championship (Arizona) 69–75
2013	AFL	National	West	4th	7	11	
Total					62	70	(includes only regular season)
Total					1	5	(includes only the postseason)
Total					63	75	(includes both regular season and postseason)

== Notable players ==
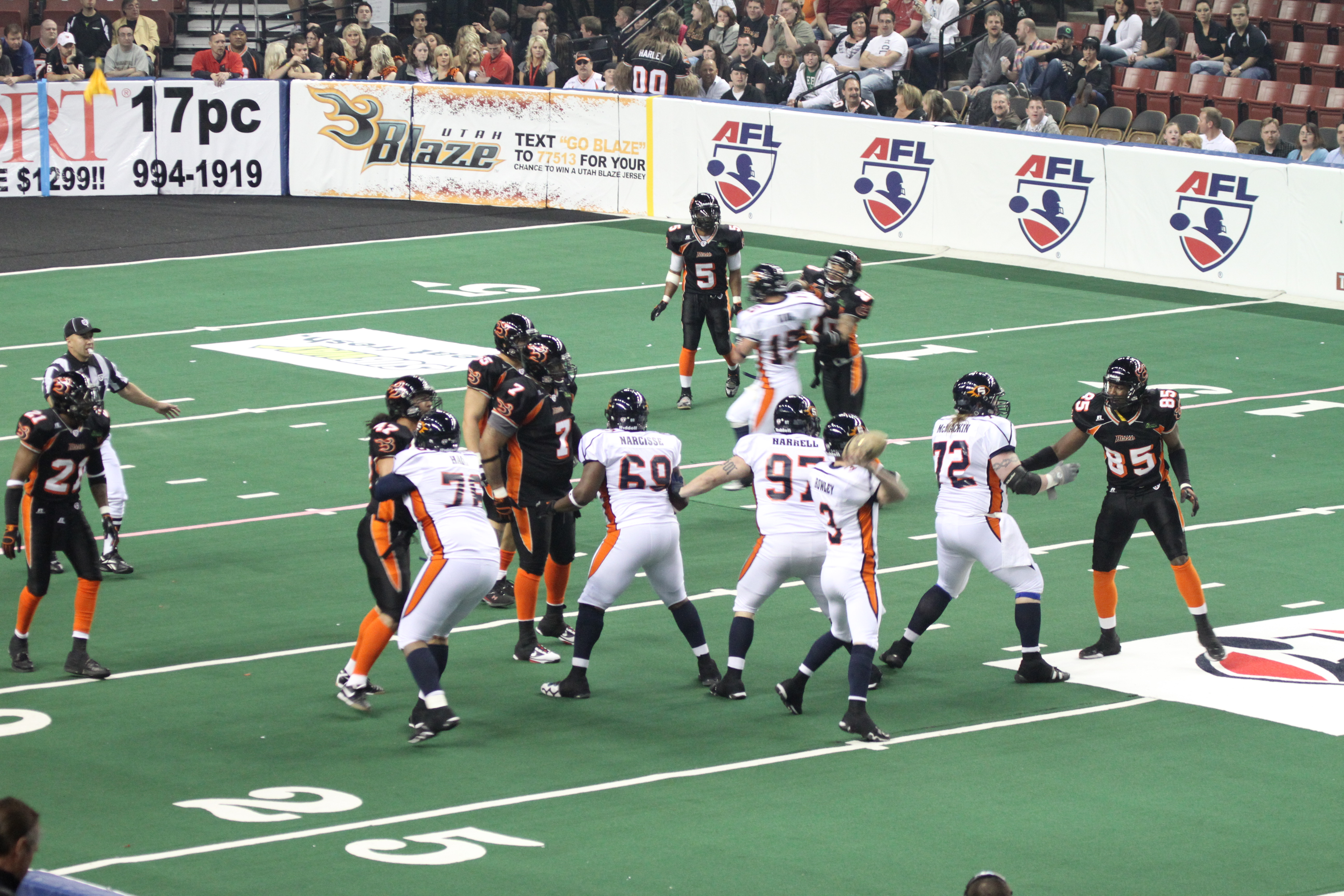
The Blaze playing the Spokane Shock on April 9, 2010

=== Retired uniform numbers ===
Utah Blaze retired numbers
N°	Player	Position	Seasons	Ref.
3	Justin Skaggs	WR/LB	2006–2007	

=== Arena Football Hall of Famers ===
Utah Blaze Hall of Famers
No.	Name	Year inducted	Position(s)	Years w/ Blaze
–	Danny White	2002	Head Coach	2006–2008

=== Individual awards ===
AFL MVP
Season	Player	Position
2012	Tommy Grady	QB

AFL Offensive Player of the Year
Season	Player	Position
2007	Siaha Burley	WR
2012	Tommy Grady	QB

AFL Rookie of the Year
Season	Player	Position
2013	Mario Urrutia	WR

=== All-Arena players ===
The following Blaze players were named to All-Arena Teams:

- QB Joe Germaine (1), Tommy Grady (1)
- WR Siaha Burley (1), Huey Whittaker (1), Aaron Boone (1), Aaron Lesué (1)
- DL Caesar Rayford (1), Mike Lewis (2)
- OS Siaha Burley (1)

=== All-Ironman players ===
The following Blaze players were named to All-Ironman Teams:

- OL/DL Hans Olsen (1)
- WR/LB Ryan Dennard (1)

=== All-Rookie players ===
The following Blaze players were named to All-Rookie Teams:

- DL Maurice Fountain

== Coaches ==
Head coach	Tenure	Regular season record (W–L)	Post season record (W–L)	Most recent coaching staff	Notes
Danny White	2006–2008	21–27	0–3	DL / LB Coach: Lindsay Hassell; DC / Dir. Player Personnel: Ron James; ST coordinator / Dir. Football Ops.: Scott Lieber	Former Dallas Cowboys quarterback. 1993 Coach of the Year; 1993 All-Star game – coach Arena Football League Hall of Fame; Class of 2002.
Chad DeGrenier	2009	11–3	0–1		Season was played in the American Indoor Football Association.
Ernesto Purnsley	2010	1–6	0–0	OC: GM / DC: ST coordinator / Dir. Football Ops.:	Replaced By Ron James during the 2010 Season
Ron James	2010–2013	29–32	1–1	OC: Matthew Sauk; DC: Rob Keefe; Equipment manager: Rory Crouch	DC / Director of Player Personnel (2007–2008). President / Owner (2012); AFL Coach of the Year (2012)
