= 2010 Spokane Shock season =

Arena Football League team season

- Owner: Brady Nelson
- Head coach: Rob Keefe
- Home stadium: Spokane Veterans Memorial Arena

Results
- Record: 13–3
- Division place: 1st NC West
- Playoffs: Won National Conference Semifinals 57-49 (Rattlers); Won National Conference Championship 60-57 (Iron); Won ArenaBowl XXIII 69-57 (Storm)

The 2010 Spokane Shock season was the fifth season for the franchise, and the first in the current incarnation of the Arena Football League, coming from the AF2, which dissolved following the 2009 season. The team is coached by Rob Keefe and played their home games at Spokane Veterans Memorial Arena.

== Standings ==
West Division
Team	W	L	PCT	PF	PA	DIV	CON	Home	Away
z-Spokane Shock	13	3	.812	988	843	4–0	8–2	6–2	7–1
x-Arizona Rattlers	10	6	.625	987	885	2–2	5–5	5–3	5–3
Utah Blaze	2	14	.125	742	1040	0–4	0–10	1–7	1–7

z - Clinched division and conference's best record
x - Clinched playoff berth

== Regular season schedule ==
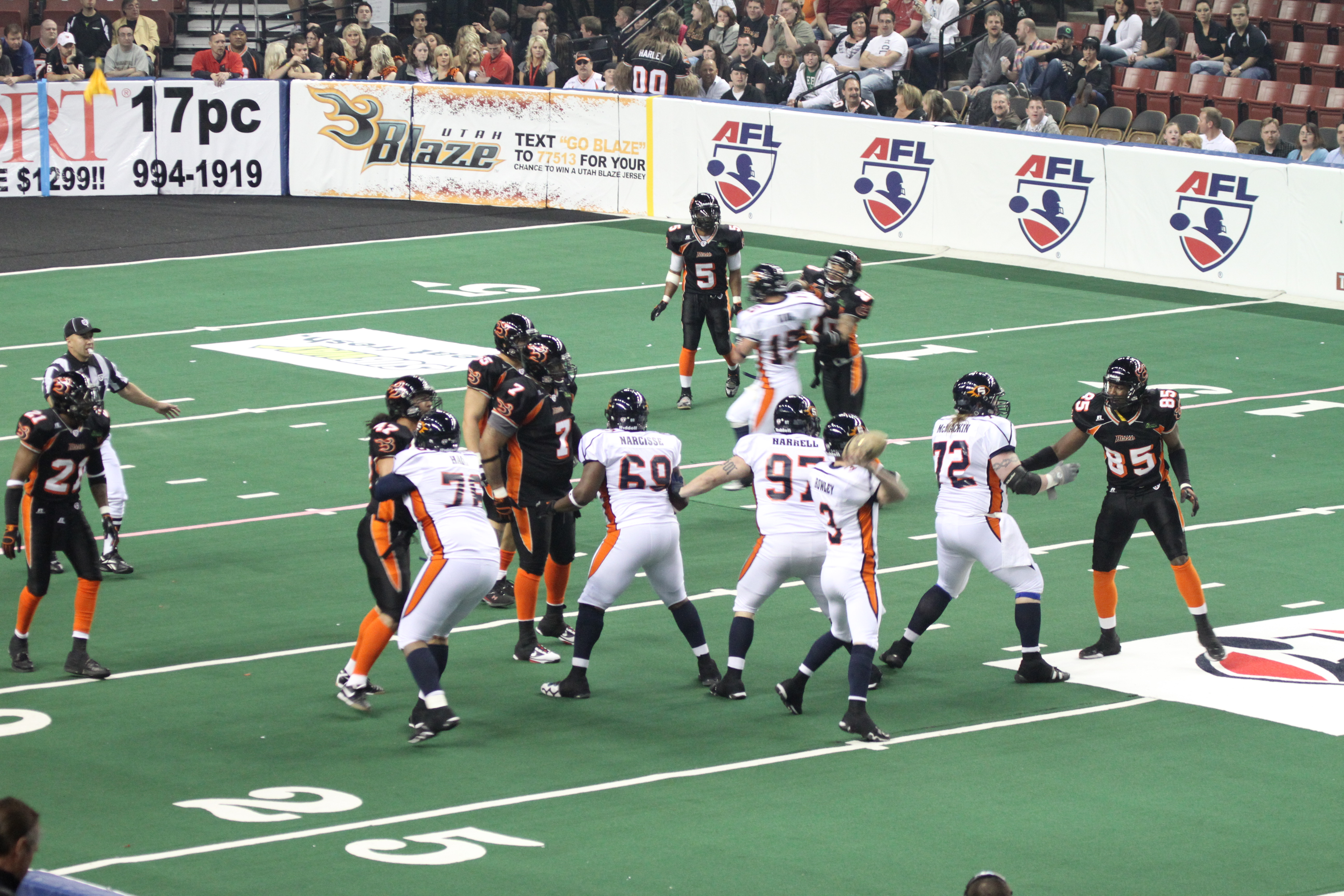
The Shock playing the Utah Blaze on April 9

The Shock, coming off of their ArenaCup X victory in the 2009 AF2 season, opened the 2010 season at home against the Iron on April 2. Their final regular season game was on the road against the Sharks.

Week	Day	Date	Kickoff	Opponent	Results		Location	Report
Week	Day	Date	Kickoff	Opponent	Score	Record	Location	Report
1	Friday	April 2	11:00 pm	Milwaukee Iron	L 62–74	0–1	Spokane Veterans Memorial Arena	
2	Friday	April 9	9:05 pm	at Utah Blaze	W 68–34	1–1	E Center	
3	Saturday	April 17	10:00 pm	Bossier–Shreveport Battle Wings	W 78–70	2–1	Spokane Veterans Memorial Arena	
4	Bye							
5	Saturday	May 1	10:00 pm	Cleveland Gladiators	L 68–72	2–2	Spokane Veterans Memorial Arena	
6	Friday	May 7	10:30 pm	at Arizona Rattlers	W 63–56	3–2	US Airways Center	
7	Sunday	May 16	3:05 pm	at Oklahoma City Yard Dawgz	W 68–63	4–2	Cox Convention Center	
8	Saturday	May 22	10:00 pm	Utah Blaze	W 77–28	5–2	Spokane Veterans Memorial Arena	
9	Saturday	May 29	10:00 pm	Jacksonville Sharks	W 67–57	6–2	Spokane Veterans Memorial Arena	
10	Bye							
11	Saturday	June 12	7:30 pm	at Orlando Predators	W 53–52	7–2	Amway Arena	
12	Friday	June 18	10:00 pm	Tulsa Talons	W 63–42	8–2	Spokane Veterans Memorial Arena	
13	Saturday	June 26	8:00 pm	at Milwaukee Iron	W 62–48	9–2	Bradley Center	
14	Friday	July 2	10:00 pm	Arizona Rattlers	W 37–36	10–2	Spokane Veterans Memorial Arena	
15	Saturday	July 10	7:00 pm	at Cleveland Gladiators	W 62–56 (OT)	11–2	Quicken Loans Arena	
16	Friday	July 16	8:05 pm	at Iowa Barnstormers	W 48–42	12–2	Wells Fargo Arena	
17	Friday	July 23	8:00 pm	Chicago Rush	W 63–49	13–2	Spokane Veterans Memorial Arena	
18	Friday	July 30	7:35 pm	Jacksonville Sharks	L 49–64	13–3	Jacksonville Veterans Memorial Arena	

== Playoff schedule ==
Round	Day	Date	Kickoff	Opponent	Score	Location	Report
NC Semifinals	Friday	August 6	11:00 pm	Arizona Rattlers	W 57–49	Spokane Veterans Memorial Arena	
NC Championship	Thursday	August 12	8:00 pm	Milwaukee Iron	W 60–57	Spokane Veterans Memorial Arena	
ArenaBowl XXIII	Friday	August 20	8:00 pm	Tampa Bay Storm	W 69–57	Spokane Veterans Memorial Arena	

All times are EDT

== Roster ==
2010 Spokane Shock roster
Quarterbacks: 3 Kyle Rowley; 14 Brian Zbydniewski; Fullbacks: 97 Clay Harrell; Wide receivers: 21 Shaun Kauleinamoku; 0 Greg Orton; 19 Emery Sammons; 8 Markee White; 17 Huey Whittaker	Offensive linemen: 94 Adam Juratovac; 72 Rob McMackin; 75 Ed Ta'amu; Defensive linemen: 77 Richard Clebert; 4 Jeremy Geathers; 22 Tito Hannah; 56 Jerry Turner	Linebackers: 7 Antwan Marsh; 11 Aaron Robbins; Defensive backs: 13 Mervin Brookins; 6 Will Mulder; 1 Alex Teems; 12 Travis Williams; Kickers: 16 Taylor Rowan	Injured reserve: 44 Mike Alston DL (IR); 99 Ben McCombs DL (IR); 9 Erik Meyer QB (IR); 91 Harrison Nikolao OL (IR); 2 Quorey Payne WR (IR); 5 Eddie Thompson DB (IR); -- Alan Jones DB (IR); 15 Raul Vijil WR (IR); Other league exempt: -- Brigham Harwell OL (Exempt); 51 Chris Pino OL (Exempt); -- Jeremy Unertl DB (Exempt); Inactive reserve: Currently vacant; Refused to report: -- John Williams OL (DNR); Recallable reassignment: Currently vacant; Rookies in italics Roster updated July 20, 2010; 22 Active, 11 Inactive → More rosters

== Regular season ==
=== Week 1: vs. Milwaukee Iron ===
Quarter	1	2	3	4	Total
Iron	6	28	14	26	74
Shock	7	14	7	34	62

at Spokane Veterans Memorial Arena, Spokane, Washington

- Date: April 2
- Game time: 11:00 pm EDT
- Game attendance: 10,500
- Recap

Game information

1st quarter

- Spokane – Huey Whittaker 12-yard pass from Kyle Rowley (Taylor Rowan kick), 4:00
- Milwaukee – Anthony Jones 5-yard pass from Chris Greisen (Robert Forstrom kick no good), 1:26

2nd quarter

- Milwaukee – Nate Forse 19-yard pass from Chris Greisen (Robert Forstrom kick),
- Spokane – Branden Hall 1-yard pass from Kyle Rowley (Taylor Rowan kick), 3:21
- Milwaukee – Anthony Jones 9-yard pass from Chris Greisen (Robert Forstrom kick), 0:54
- Spokane – Huey Whittaker 12-yard pass from Kyle Rowley (Taylor Rowan kick), 0:31
- Milwaukee – Damian Harrell 19-yard pass from Chris Greisen (Robert Forstrom kick), 0:18
- Milwaukee – Raul Vijil 9-yard interception return (Robert Forstrom kick), 0:00

3rd quarter

- Milwaukee – Anthony Jones 6-yard pass from Chris Greisen (Robert Forstrom kick), 8:23
- Spokane – Markee White 31-yard pass from Kyle Rowley (Taylor Rowan kick), 6:09
- Milwaukee – Nate Forse 5-yard pass from Chris Greisen (Robert Forstrom kick), 2:37

4th quarter

- Spokane – Markee White 8-yard pass from Kyle Rowley (Taylor Rowan kick), 14:19
- Milwaukee – Damian Harrell 13-yard pass from Chris Greisen (Robert Forstrom kick), 13:58
- Spokane – Quorey Payne 58-yard kickoff return (Taylor Rowan kick), 13:09
- Spokane – Huey Whittaker 9-yard pass from Kyle Rowley (Taylor Rowan kick), 9:32
- Milwaukee – Tyre Young 2-yard run (Robert Forstrom kick no good), 3:27
- Spokane – Kyle Rowley 1-yard run (Taylor Rowan kick), 0:55
- Milwaukee – Nate Forse 17-yard pass from Chris Greisen (Robert Forstrom kick), 0:52
- Milwaukee – Anthony Jones 11-yard pass from Chris Greisen (Robert Forstrom kick no good), 0:35
- Spokane – Huey Whittaker Kyle Rowley 15-yard pass from Kyle Rowley, 0:00

Passing

- Milwaukee – Chris Greisen: 29/35, 317 yards, 9 TD
- Spokane – Kyle Rowley: 29/35, 259 yards, 7 TD, 3 INT

Rushing

- Milwaukee – Tyre Young: 5 att, 41 yards, 1 TD
- Spokane – Kyle Rowley: 2 att, 8 yards, 1 TD

Receiving

- Milwaukee – Nate Forse: 11 rec, 128 yards, 3 TD
- Spokane – Huey Whittaker: 11 rec, 97 yards, 4 TD

The Shock were unable to keep up with the Iron and dropped their first game of the season. Turnovers assisted their downfall, losing a fumble on their first possession, and giving up an interception that was returned for a touchdown on the final play of the 1st half. The Shock were able to get within a touchdown of the Iron, but turned the ball over again late in the 4th quarter which led to a Milwaukee touchdown, putting the game out of reach. Spokane was able to score a touchdown on their ensuing drive, but as they did, the clock read zeroes and the game was over.

Making his AFL debut, quarterback Kyle Rowley completed 29 of 35 passes for 259 yards and 7 touchdowns, but also threw 3 interceptions. Huey Whittaker led all receivers with 97 yards and 4 touchdowns.

=== Week 2: at Utah Blaze ===
Quarter	1	2	3	4	Total
Shock	14	21	20	13	68
Blaze	7	7	6	14	34

at E Center, West Valley City, Utah

- Date: April 9
- Game time: 9:05 pm EDT
- Game attendance: 5,032
- Referee: Steve Strimling
- Recap

Game information

1st quarter

- Spokane – Eddie Thompson 3-yard run (Taylor Rowan kick), 11:06
- Spokane – Huey Whittaker 17-yard pass from Kyle Rowley (Taylor Rowan kick), 5:27
- Utah – Brandon Hampton 54-yard kickoff return (Kenny Byrd kick), 4:45

2nd quarter

- Spokane – Raul Vijil 11-yard pass from Kyle Rowley (Taylor Rowan kick no good), 13:43
- Utah – Brandon Hampton 56-yard kickoff return (Kenny Byrd kick), 12:55
- Spokane – Markee White 14-yard pass from Kyle Rowley (Markee White pass), 8:55
- Spokane – Kyle Rowley 1-yard run (Taylor Rowan kick), 0:29

3rd quarter

- Spokane – Raul Vijil 27-yard pass from Kyle Rowley (Taylor Rowan kick), 12:04
- Spokane – Raul Vijil 21-yard pass from Kyle Rowley (Taylor Rowan kick), 9:32
- Utah – Aaron Boone 3-yard pass from Brett Elliot (Kenny Byrd kick no good), 2:23
- Spokane – Markee White 31-yard pass from Kyle Rowley (Taylor Rowan kick no good), 0:20

4th quarter

- Utah – Aaron Boone 9-yard pass from Brett Elliot (Kenny Byrd kick no good), 13:34
- Spokane – Raul Vijil 56-yard kickoff return (Taylor Rowan kick), 12:35
- Utah – Wendall Williams 8-yard run (Aaron Boone pass), 10:56
- Spokane – Huey Whittaker 1-yard pass from Erik Meyer (Taylor Rowan kick no good), 0:07

Passing

- Spokane – Kyle Rowley: 21/29, 224 yards, 6 TD
- Utah – Brett Elliot: 10/17, 122 yards, 2 TD

Rushing

- Spokane – Kyle Rowley: 2 att, 7 yards, 1 TD
- Utah –Wendall Williams: 1 att, 8 yards, 1 TD

Receiving

- Spokane – Markee White: 8 rec, 118 yards, 2 TD
- Utah – Aaron Boone: 8 rec, 90 yards, 2 TD

The Shock had their first win of the year after routing the host Utah Blaze. Spokane's defense did not allow a point in the 1st half, as the only two touchdowns scored by the Blaze were a pair of kickoff returns. Quarterback Kyle Rowley threw for 224 yards and 6 touchdowns. Markee White led all receivers with 118 yards and 2 touchdowns.

=== Week 3: vs. Bossier–Shreveport Battle Wings ===
Quarter	1	2	3	4	Total
Battle Wings	6	26	15	23	70
Shock	16	21	14	27	78

at Spokane Veterans Memorial Arena, Spokane, Washington

- Date: April 17
- Game time: 10:00 pm EDT
- Game attendance: 10,378
- Recap

Game information

1st quarter

- Bossier–Shreveport – Randy Hymes 29-yard pass from Raymond Philyaw (Art Carmody kick no good), 10:51
- Spokane – Markee White 14-yard pass from Kyle Rowley (Taylor Rowan kick), 7:32
- Spokane – Safety, 6:57
- Spokane – Eddie Thompson 1-yard run (Taylor Rowan kick), 0:23

2nd quarter

- Bossier–Shreveport – Kinsmon Lancaster 9-yard pass from Raymond Philyaw (Art Carmody kick), 10:11
- Spokane – Huey Whittaker 43-yard pass from Kyle Rowley (Taylor Rowan kick)
- Bossier–Shreveport – Willis Marshall 30-yard pass from Raymond Philyaw (Art Carmody kick), 8:20
- Bossier–Shreveport – P.J. Berry 14-yard pass from Raymond Philyaw (Art Carmody pass no good), 3:33
- Spokane – Kyle Rowley 1-yard run (Taylor Rowan kick), 0:58
- Bossier–Shreveport – Randy Hymes 6-yard pass from Raymond Philyaw (Art Carmody kick no good), 0:21
- Spokane – Raul Vijil 20-yard pass from Kyle Rowley (Taylor Rowan kick), 0:00

3rd quarter

- Bossier–Shreveport – Randy Hymes 13-yard pass from Raymond Philyaw (Art Carmody kick), 12:02
- Spokane – Markee White 7-yard pass from Kyle Rowley (Taylor Rowan kick), 9:34
- Bossier–Shreveport – P.J. Berry 28-yard pass from Raymond Philyaw (Randy Hymes pass), 8:28
- Spokane – Huey Whittaker 4-yard pass from Kyle Rowley (Taylor Rowan kick), 2:17

4th quarter

- Spokane – Markee White 6-yard pass from Kyle Rowley (Taylor Rowan kick), 12:04
- Spokane – Roderick Mosley 9-yard interception return (Taylor Rowan kick), 10:26
- Bossier–Shreveport – Randy Hymes 39-yard pass from Raymond Philyaw (Art Carmody pass no good), 6:55
- Spokane – Raul Vijil 41-yard pass from Kyle Rowley (Taylor Rowan kick) 5:01
- Bossier–Shreveport – Randy Hymes 18-yard pass from Raymond Philyaw (Art Carmody kick), 2:55
- Spokane – Huey Whittaker 5-yard pass from Kyle Rowley (Kyle Rowley pass no good), 0:44
- Bossier–Shreveport – Roshawn Marshall intercepted two-point conversion pass return, 0:44
- Bossier–Shreveport – Kinsmon Lancaster 9-yard pass from Raymond Philyaw (P.J. Berry pass), 0:33

Passing

- Bossier–Shreveport – Raymond Philyaw: 22/36, 349 yards, 10 TD, 1 INT
- Spokane – Kyle Rowley: 28/37, 316 yards, 8 TD, 1 INT

Rushing

- Bossier–Shreveport – Byron Douzart: 1 att, 4 yards
- Spokane – Eddie Thompson: 1 att, 1 yard, 1 TD

Receiving

- Bossier–Shreveport – Randy Hymes: 9 rec, 174 yards, 5 TD
- Spokane – Raul Vijil: 8 rec, 103 yards, 2 TD

The Shock defeated the Battle Wings in an offensive shootout for their second win of the year. The Shock's defense held the Battle Wings' P.J. Berry to just 4 receptions and 2 touchdowns, forcing Bossier–Shreveport quarterback Raymond Philyaw to look for other receivers. In the 4th quarter, Roderick Mosley came up with an interception that he returned 9 yards for a touchdown, allowing the Shock to pull ahead by a score of 65–47. The teams traded touchdowns for the rest of the game, and the clock eventually ran out on Bossier–Shreveport which gave the win to Spokane. Kyle Rowley finished the game with 316 yards and 8 touchdowns. All of his touchdown passes were to Raul Vijil, Markee White, or Huey Whittaker. Those three receivers combined for 301 yards.

=== Week 5: vs. Cleveland Gladiators ===
Quarter	1	2	3	4	Total
Gladiators	21	17	0	34	72
Shock	14	20	14	20	68

at Spokane Veterans Memorial Arena, Spokane, Washington

- Date: May 1
- Game time: 10:00 pm EDT
- Game attendance: 9,974
- Referee: Shane Anderson
- Recap

Game information

1st quarter

- Cleveland – Ben Nelson 46-yard pass from John Dutton (Matt Denny kick), 13:38
- Cleveland – Brent Holmes 24-yard pass from John Dutton (Matt Denny kick), 8:51
- Spokane – Branden Hall 10-yard pass from Kyle Rowley (Taylor Rowan kick), 5:22
- Spokane – James Todd 0-yard fumble return (Taylor Rowan kick), 2:58
- Cleveland – Ben Nelson 13-yard pass from John Dutton (John Dutton kick), 0:00

2nd quarter

- Spokane – Eddie Thompson 2-yard run (Taylor Rowan kick no good), 10:44
- Cleveland – Victor Williams 22-yard interception return (Matt Denny kick), 2:14
- Spokane – Raul Vijil 39-yard pass from Kyle Rowley (Taylor Rowan kick), 1:00
- Cleveland – Victor Williams 2-yard run (Matt Denny kick), 0:30
- Spokane – Markee White 34-yard pass from Kyle Rowley (Taylor Rowan kick), 0:22
- Cleveland – Matt Denny 33-yard field goal, 0:00

3rd quarter

- Spokane – Huey Whittaker 11-yard pass from Kyle Rowley (Taylor Rowan kick), 11:07
- Spokane – Markee White 4-yard pass from Kyle Rowley (Taylor Rowan kick), 4:50

4th quarter

- Cleveland – Ben Nelson 6-yard pass from John Dutton (Matt Denny kick), 12:10
- Cleveland – Russell Monk 48-yard run (Matt Denny kick), 12:44
- Spokane – Huey Whittaker 2-yard pass from Kyle Rowley (Taylor Rowan kick), 7:01
- Cleveland – Victor Williams 8-yard pass from John Dutton (Matt Denny kick), 2:40
- Spokane – Huey Whittaker 2-yard pass from Kyle Rowley (Taylor Rowan kick no good), 0:47
- Cleveland – Ben Nelson 23-yard pass from John Dutton (Matt Denny kick no good), 0:36
- Spokane – Raul Vijil 4-yard pass from Kyle Rowley (Taylor Rowan kick), 0:09
- Cleveland – Brent Holmes 56-yard kickoff return (Matt Denny kick), 0:02

Passing

- Cleveland – John Dutton: 25/39, 285 yards, 6 TD, 2 INT
- Spokane – Kyle Rowley: 29/44, 373 yards, 8 TD, 2 INT

Rushing

- Cleveland – Victor Williams: 1 att, 2 yards, 1 TD
- Spokane – Eddie Thompson: 3 att, 45 yard, 1 TD

Receiving

- Cleveland – Ben Nelson: 7 rec, 129 yards, 4 TD
- Spokane – Huey Whittaker: 11 rec, 149 yards, 3 TD

The Shock lost to the previously winless Gladiators at home in the final seconds of the game, giving up 5 touchdowns to Cleveland in the final quarter. There were four lead changes in the final minute of the game. Spokane took a 61–59 lead with 46 seconds to go on a 2-yard touchdown reception by Huey Whittaker. Cleveland responded with a 27-yard touchdown pass with 35 seconds left, going up 65–61 following a missed extra point. The Shock engineered a 5-play drive that covered 45 yards and ended with a 4-yard touchdown catch by Raul Vijil with 8 seconds remaining, and they went up 68–65. However Cleveland's Brent Holmes took the ensuing kickoff 56 yards back for a touchdown, allowing the Gladiators to go up 72–68 with just 1.8 seconds left. Eddie Thompson received the final kickoff for the Shock as the clock ran out, but Spokane was allowed to run one final play thanks to an unsportsmanlike conduct penalty on Cleveland after their go-ahead score. Kyle Rowley's pass to Markee White fell incomplete, ending the game amidst the protests the Shock's fans, who wanted a defensive pass interference penalty called.

Rowley had a season-high 375 passing yards in the game along with 9 touchdowns, but also threw 2 interceptions. Huey Whittaker was the leading receiver with 11 catches for 149 yards and 3 touchdowns.

=== Week 6: at Arizona Rattlers ===
Quarter	1	2	3	4	Total
Shock	14	14	14	21	63
Rattlers	14	14	14	14	56

at US Airways Center, Phoenix, Arizona

- Date: May 7
- Game time: 10:30 pm EDT
- Game attendance: 10,203
- Referee: Shawn Hochuli
- Recap

Game information

1st quarter

- Spokane – Raul Vijil 5-yard pass from Kyle Rowley (Taylor Rowan kick), 13:01
- Spokane – Alan Jones 2-yard run (Taylor Rowan kick), 4:49
- Arizona – Rod Windsor 3-yard pass from Nick Davila (Jason Witczak kick)
- Arizona – J.J. McKelvey 3-yard pass from Nick Davila (Jason Witczak kick), 1:04

2nd quarter

- Arizona – J.J. McKelvey 3-yard pass from Nick Davila (Jason Witczak kick), 10:55
- Spokane – Kyle Rowley 3-yard run (Taylor Rowan kick), 6:47
- Spokane – Huey Whittaker 3-yard pass from Kyle Rowley (Taylor Rowan kick), 0:44
- Arizona – J.J. McKelvey 2-yard pass from Nick Davila (Jason Witczak kick), 0:04

3rd quarter

- Arizona – J.J. McKelvey 23-yard pass from Nick Davila (Jason Witczak kick), 13:55
- Spokane – Raul Vijil 31-yard pass from Kyle Rowley (Taylor Rowan kick), 11:18
- Arizona – Rod Windsor 5-yard pass from Nick Davila (Jason Witczak kick), 7:01
- Spokane – Huey Whittaker 48-yard pass from Kyle Rowley (Taylor Rowan kick), 5:03

4th quarter

- Spokane – Raul Vijil 10-yard pass from Kyle Rowley (Taylor Rowan kick), 12:48
- Arizona – Rod Windsor 44-yard pass from Nick Davila (Jason Witczak kick), 12:06
- Spokane – Markee White 34-yard pass from Kyle Rowley (Taylor Rowan kick), 8:49
- Arizona – Johnie Kirton 2-yard run (Jason Witczak kick), 5:29
- Spokane – Raul Vijil 23-yard pass from Kyle Rowley (Taylor Rowan kick), 2:08

Passing

- Spokane – Kyle Rowley: 22/37, 369 yards, 7 TD
- Arizona – Nick Davila: 28/44, 346 yards, 7 TD, 2 INT

Rushing

- Spokane – Kyle Rowley: 1 att, 3 yards, 1 TD
- Arizona – Johnie Kirton: 4 att, 14 yards, 1 TD

Receiving

- Spokane – Raul Vijil: 10 rec, 157 yards, 4 TD
- Arizona – Rod Windsor: 14 rec, 157 yards, 3 TD

=== Week 7: at Oklahoma City Yard Dawgz ===
Quarter	1	2	3	4	Total
Shock	7	24	14	23	68
Yard Dawgz	14	14	14	21	63

at Cox Convention Center, Oklahoma City, Oklahoma

- Date: May 16
- Game time: 3:05 pm EDT
- Game attendance: 4,415
- Recap

Game information

1st quarter

- Oklahoma City – Al Hunt 38-yard pass from Tommy Grady (A.J. Haglund kick), 8:45
- Spokane – Huey Whittaker 9-yard pass from Kyle Rowley (Taylor Rowan kick), 2:35
- Oklahoma City – Timon Marshall 56-yard kickoff return (A.J. Haglund kick), 1:43

2nd quarter

- Spokane – Shaun Kauleinamoku 21-yard pass from Kyle Rowley (Taylor Rowan kick), 14:16
- Spokane – Markee White 2-yard pass from Kyle Rowley (Taylor Rowan kick), 5:49
- Oklahoma City – Craig Fulton Jr. 4-yard pass from Tommy Grady (A.J. Haglund kick), 3:18
- Spokane – Huey Whittaker 2-yard pass from Kyle Rowley (Taylor Rowan kick), 0:34
- Oklahoma City – Timon Marshall 27-yard pass from Tommy Grady (A.J. Haglund kick), 0:24
- Spokane – Taylor Rowan 10-yard field goal, 0:04

3rd quarter

- Oklahoma City – Anthony Hines 19-yard pass from Tommy Grady (A.J. Haglund kick), 10:11
- Spokane – Quorey Payne 2-yard run (Taylor Rowan kick), 5:14
- Oklahoma City – Craig Fulton Jr. 13-yard pass from Tommy Grady (A.J. Haglund kick), 3:20
- Spokane – Shaun Kauleinamoku 25-yard pass from Kyle Rowley (Taylor Rowan kick), 0:27

4th quarter

- Oklahoma City – Al Hunt 7-yard pass from Tommy Grady (AJ Haglund kick), 14:19
- Spokane – Huey Whittaker 12-yard pass from Kyle Rowley (Taylor Rowan kick), 10:16
- Oklahoma City – Al Hunt 1-yard run (A.J. Haglund kick), 7:16
- Spokane – Branden Hall 8-yard pass from Kyle Rowley (Taylor Rowan kick), 4:12
- Spokane – Ben McCombs 0-yard fumble return (Taylor Rowan kick no good), 1:13
- Spokane – Taylor Rowan 11-yard field goal, 0:27
- Oklahoma City – Al Hunt 30-yard pass from Tommy Grady (A.J. Haglund kick), 0:23

Passing

- Spokane – Kyle Rowley: 28/54, 344 yards, 7 TD, 1 INT
- Oklahoma City – Tommy Grady: 21/31, 303 yards, 7 TD, 1 INT

Rushing

- Spokane – Quorey Payne: 4 att, 8 yards, 1 TD
- Oklahoma City – Chad Cook: 2 att, 8 yards

Receiving

- Spokane – Huey Whittaker: 13 rec, 152 yards, 3 TD
- Oklahoma City – Al Hunt: 5 rec, 110 yards, 3 TD

=== Week 8: vs. Utah Blaze ===
Quarter	1	2	3	4	Total
Blaze	16	0	6	6	28
Shock	14	35	7	21	77

at Spokane Veterans Memorial Arena, Spokane, Washington

- Date: May 22
- Game time: 10:00 pm EDT
- Game attendance: 10,481
- Referee: Shane Anderson
- Recap

Game information

1st quarter

- Spokane – Aaron Robbins 2-yard kickoff return (Taylor Rowan kick), 14:07
- Utah – Chris Francies 6-yard pass from Brett Elliott (Ben Scott kick no good), 11:04
- Spokane – Raul Vijil 37-yard pass from Kyle Rowley (Taylor Rowan kick), 9:23
- Utah – Chris Francies 21-yard pass from Brett Elliott (Ben Scott kick), 7:52
- Utah – Ben Scott 11-yard field goal, 4:50

2nd quarter

- Spokane – Harrison Nikolao 1-yard run (Taylor Rowan kick), 14:05
- Spokane – Huey Whittaker 3-yard pass from Kyle Rowley (Taylor Rowan kick), 11:32
- Spokane – Shaun Kauleinamoku 11-yard pass from Kyle Rowley (Taylor Rowan kick), 7:45
- Spokane – Raul Vijil 8-yard pass from Kyle Rowley (Taylor Rowan kick), 5:00
- Spokane – Raul Vijil 1-yard pass from Kyle Rowley (Taylor Rowan kick), 0:34

3rd quarter

- Spokane – Raul Vijil 31-yard pass from Erik Meyer (Taylor Rowan kick), 4:24
- Utah – Aaron Boone 1-yard pass from Michael Affleck (Aaron Boone pass no good), 0:12

4th quarter

- Spokane – Shaun Kauleinamoku 17-yard pass from Erik Meyer (Taylor Rowan kick), 10:12
- Spokane – Quorey Payne 28-yard pass from Erik Meyer (Taylor Rowan kick), 5:09
- Utah – Aaron Boone 1-yard pass from Michael Affleck (Aaron Boone pass no good), 2:51
- Spokane – Shaun Kauleinamoku 50-yard pass from Erik Meyer (Taylor Rowan kick), 1:00

Passing

- Utah – Brett Elliott: 6/11, 75 yards, 2 TD
- Spokane – Erik Meyer: 10/17, 197 yards, 4 TD, 1 INT

Rushing

- Utah – Brett Elliott: 1 att, 7 yards
- Spokane – Kyle Rowley: 1 att, 4 yards

Receiving

- Utah – Chris Francies: 4 rec, 44 yards, 2 TD
- Spokane – Raul Vijil: 8 rec, 160 yards, 4 TD

=== Week 9: vs. Jacksonville Sharks ===
Quarter	1	2	3	4	Total
Sharks	14	21	15	7	57
Shock	13	20	14	20	67

at Spokane Veterans Memorial Arena, Spokane, Washington

- Date: May 29
- Game time: 10:00 pm EDT
- Game attendance: 10,460
- Referee: Shane Anderson
- Recap

Game information

1st quarter

- Jacksonville – Jeron Harvey 6-yard pass from Aaron Garcia (Massimo Scaccia kick), 10:53
- Jacksonville – Jomo Wilson 6-yard pass from Aaron Garcia (Massimo Scaccia kick), 7:06
- Spokane – Raul Vijil 16-yard pass from Kyle Rowley (Taylor Rowan kick), 2:36
- Spokane – Kevin McCullough 2-yard interception return (Taylor Rowan kick no good), 0:40

2nd quarter

- Jacksonville – Jeron Harvey 4-yard pass from Aaron Garcia (Massimo Scaccia kick), 11:51
- Spokane – Raul Vijil 32-yard pass from Kyle Rowley (Taylor Rowan kick no good), 9:52
- Jacksonville – Dallas Baker 30-yard pass from Aaron Garcia (Massimo Scaccia kick), 6:47
- Spokane – Quorey Payne 54-yard kickoff return (Taylor Rowan kick), 5:45
- Jacksonville – Dallas Baker 11-yard pass from Aaron Garcia (Massimo Scaccia kick), 2:13
- Spokane – Raul Vijil 16-yard pass from Kyle Rowley (Taylor Rowan kick), 0:16

3rd quarter

- Spokane – Raul Vijil 16-yard pass from Kyle Rowley (Taylor Rowan kick), 11:20
- Jacksonville – Jeron Harvey 27-yard pass from Aaron Garcia (Massimo Scaccia kick), 8:36
- Spokane – Huey Whittaker 4-yard pass from Kyle Rowley (Taylor Rowan kick), 6:04
- Jacksonville – Kirby Griffin 1-yard run (Bernard Morris run), 1:13

4th quarter

- Spokane – Raul Vijil 7-yard pass from Kyle Rowley (Taylor Rowan kick no good), 14:26
- Spokane – Raul Vijil 16-yard pass from Kyle Rowley (Taylor Rowan kick)
- Jacksonville – Kirby Griffin 1-yard run (Massimo Scaccia kick), 0:55
- Spokane – Raul Vijil 9-yard pass from Kyle Rowley (Taylor Rowan kick), 0:48

Passing

- Jacksonville – Aaron Garcia: 26/45, 275 yards, 6 TD, 2 INT
- Spokane – Kyle Rowley: 20/27, 210 yards, 8 TD

Rushing

- Jacksonville – Kirby Griffin: 4 att, 5 yards, 2 TD
- Spokane – Harrison Nikolao: 2 att, −1 yards

Receiving

- Jacksonville – Jomo Wilson: 10 rec, 114 yards, 1 TD
- Spokane – Raul Vijil: 11 rec, 130 yards, 7 TD

=== Week 11: at Orlando Predators ===
Quarter	1	2	3	4	Total
Shock	13	14	13	13	53
Predators	0	24	28	0	52

at Amway Arena, Orlando, Florida

- Date: June 12
- Game time: 7:30 pm EDT
- Game attendance: 10,346
- Referee: Greg LeFills
- Recap

Game information

1st quarter

- Spokane – Clay Harrell 3-yard run (Taylor Rowan kick no good), 12:23
- Spokane – Raul Vijil 12-yard pass from Kyle Rowley (Taylor Rowan kick), 3:25

2nd quarter

- Orlando – Derrick Lewis 9-yard pass from Nick Hill (Carlos Martinez kick), 14:55
- Spokane – Huey Whittaker 1-yard run (Taylor Rowan kick), 9:28
- Orlando – James Lynch 1-yard run (Carlos Martinez kick), 6:39
- Spokane – Raul Vijil 13-yard pass from Kyle Rowley (Taylor Rowan kick), 3:55
- Orlando – Nick Hill 11-yard run (Carlos Martinez kick), 0:48
- Orlando – Carlos Martinez 25-yard field goal, 0:00

3rd quarter

- Orlando – Josh Bush 4-yard run (Carlos Martinez kick), 13:48
- Orlando – Kenny McEntyre 47-yard interception return (Carlos Martinez kick), 10:53
- Spokane – Huey Whittaker 8-yard pass from Kyle Rowley (Taylor Rowan kick), 8:18
- Orlando – Josh Bush 23-yard pass from Nick Hill (Carlos Martinez kick), 6:10
- Spokane – Huey Whittaker 12-yard pass from Kyle Rowley (Huey Whittaker pass no good), 2:05
- Orlando – Kenny McEntyre 40-yard kickoff return (Carlos Martinez kick), 0:26

4th quarter

- Spokane – Raul Vijil 1-yard pass from Kyle Rowley (Taylor Rowan pass no good), 11:51
- Spokane – Raul Vijil 6-yard pass from Kyle Rowley (Taylor Rowan kick), 0:14

Passing

- Spokane – Kyle Rowley: 28/40, 305 yards, 6 TD, 3 INT
- Orlando – Nick Hill: 18/34, 207 yards, 2 TD, 1 INT

Rushing

- Spokane – Kyle Rowley: 2 att, 7 yards
- Orlando – Nick Hill: 1 att, 11 yards, 1 TD

Receiving

- Spokane – Raul Vijil: 11 rec, 134 yards, 4 TD
- Orlando – T.T. Toliver: 5 rec, 95 yards

=== Week 12: vs. Tulsa Talons ===
Quarter	1	2	3	4	Total
Talons	7	14	14	7	42
Shock	14	21	14	14	63

at Spokane Veterans Memorial Arena, Spokane, Washington

- Date: June 18
- Game time: 10:00 pm EDT
- Game attendance: 10,077
- Referee: Shane Anderson
- Recap

Game information

1st quarter

- Spokane – Antwan Marsh 1-yard run (Taylor Rowan kick), 9:55
- Tulsa – Jeff Hughley 25-yard pass from Justin Allgood (Marco Cabozzoli kick), 6:09
- Spokane – Raul Vijil 9-yard pass from Kyle Rowley (Taylor Rowan kick), 1:23

2nd quarter

- Tulsa – Donovan Morgan 13-yard pass from Justin Allgood (Marco Cabozzoli kick), 12:55
- Spokane – Ed Ta'amu 7-yard pass from Kyle Rowley (Taylor Rowan kick), 9:33
- Tulsa – Carlese Franklin 16-yard pass from Justin Allgood (Marco Cabozzoli kick), 5:22
- Spokane – Raul Vijil 15-yard pass from Kyle Rowley (Taylor Rowan kick), 4:28
- Spokane – Kyle Rowley 2-yard run (Taylor Rowan kick), 0:35

3rd quarter

- Tulsa – Donovan Morgan 9-yard pass from Justin Allgood (Marco Cabozzoli kick), 12:36
- Spokane – Raul Vijil 8-yard pass from Kyle Rowley (Taylor Rowan kick), 7:53
- Tulsa – Odie Armstrong 2-yard run (Marco Cabozzoli kick), 4:36
- Spokane – Emery Sammons 47-yard pass from Kyle Rowley (Taylor Rowan kick), 0:00

4th quarter

- Spokane – Raul Vijil 5-yard pass from Kyle Rowley (Taylor Rowan kick), 5:44
- Tulsa – Donovan Morgan 1-yard pass from Justin Allgood (Marco Cabozzoli kick), 0:31
- Spokane – Raul Vijil 5-yard pass from Kyle Rowley (Taylor Rowan kick), 0:19

Passing

- Tulsa – Justin Allgood: 24/47, 341 yards, 5 TD, 2 INT
- Spokane – Kyle Rowley: 28/37, 307 yards, 7 TD, 1 INT

Rushing

- Tulsa – Odie Armstrong: 3 att, 10 yards, 1 TD
- Spokane – Clay Harrell: 2 att, 10 yards

Receiving

- Tulsa – Donovan Morgan: 9 rec, 129 yards, 3 TD
- Spokane – Raul Vijil: 11 rec, 103 yards, 5 TD

=== Week 13: at Milwaukee Iron ===
Quarter	1	2	3	4	Total
Shock	21	13	21	7	62
Iron	7	14	20	7	48

at Bradley Center, Milwaukee, Wisconsin

- Date: June 26
- Game time: 8:05 pm EDT
- Game attendance: 6,613
- Recap

Game information

1st quarter

- Spokane – Raul Vijil 28-yard pass from Kyle Rowley (Taylor Rowan kick), 12:22
- Spokane – Antwan Marsh 2-yard run (Taylor Rowan kick), 10:05
- Milwaukee – Damian Harrell 28-yard pass from Chris Greisen (Robert Forstrom kick), 5:54
- Spokane – Raul Vijil 5-yard pass from Kyle Rowley (Taylor Rowan kick), 1:02

2nd quarter

- Spokane – Antwan Marsh 11-yard interception return (Taylor Rowan kick), 14:20
- Milwaukee – Nate Forse 15-yard pass from Chris Greisen (Robert Forstrom kick), 8:59
- Spokane – Taylor Rowan 15-yard field goal, 6:02
- Milwaukee – Tyre Young 1-yard run (Robert Forstrom kick), 1:48
- Spokane – Taylor Rowan 9-yard field goal, 0:00

3rd quarter

- Milwaukee – Anthony Jones 30-yard pass from Chris Greisen (Robert Forstrom kick), 13:06
- Milwaukee – Nate Forse 11-yard pass from Chris Greisen (Robert Forstrom kick no good), 10:24
- Spokane – Huey Whittaker 21-yard pass from Kyle Rowley (Taylor Rowan kick), 9:08
- Milwaukee – Nate Forse 27-yard pass from Chris Greisen (Robert Forstrom kick), 5:56
- Spokane – Antwan Marsh 3-yard run (Taylor Rowan kick), 3:19
- Spokane – Emery Sammons 0-yard kickoff return (Taylor Rowan kick), 2:32

4th quarter

- Milwaukee – Anthony Jones 30-yard pass from Chris Greisen (Robert Forstrom kick), 14:09
- Spokane – Huey Whittaker 33-yard pass from Kyle Rowley (Taylor Rowan kick), 12:06
- Spokane – Kyle Rowley: 14/24, 195 yards, 4 TD
- Milwaukee – Chris Greisen: 21/42, 256 yards, 6 TD, 2 INT

Rushing

- Spokane – Antwan Marsh: 2 att, 5 yards, 2 TD
- Milwaukee – Tyre Young: 3 att, 10 yards, 1 TD

Receiving

- Spokane – Huey Whittaker: 7 rec, 99 yards, 2 TD
- Milwaukee – Anthony Jones: 5 rec, 95 yards, 2 TD

=== Week 14: vs. Arizona Rattlers ===
Quarter	1	2	3	4	Total
Rattlers	7	14	7	8	36
Shock	7	20	3	7	37

at Spokane Veterans Memorial Arena, Spokane, Washington

- Date: July 2
- Game time: 10:00 pm EDT
- Game attendance: 10,268
- Recap

=== Week 15: at Cleveland Gladiators ===
Quarter	1	2	3	4	OT	Total
Shock	14	21	14	7	6	62
Gladiators	7	21	14	14	0	56

at Quicken Loans Arena, Cleveland Ohio

- Date: July 10
- Game time: 7:00 pm EDT
- Game attendance: 8,237
- Recap

Game information

1st quarter

- Cleveland – Ben Nelson 22-yard pass from John Dutton (Matt Denny kick), 12:00
- Spokane – Huey Whittaker 22-yard pass from Kyle Rowley (Taylor Rowan kick), 8:38
- Spokane – Shaun Kauleinamoku 13-yard pass from Kyle Rowley (Taylor Rowan kick), 0:01

2nd quarter

- Spokane – Huey Whittaker 14-yard pass from Kyle Rowley (Taylor Rowan kick), 12:24
- Cleveland – Russell Monk 2-yard run (Matt Denny kick), 6:31
- Spokane – Huey Whittaker 3-yard pass from Kyle Rowley (Taylor Rowan kick), 3:53
- Cleveland – Adam Tadisch 19-yard pass from John Dutton (Matt Denny kick), 0:54
- Spokane – Greg Orton 4-yard pass from Kyle Rowley (Taylor Rowan kick), 0:46
- Cleveland – Ben Nelson 8-yard pass from John Dutton (Matt Denny kick), 0:19

3rd quarter

- Spokane – Huey Whittaker 32-yard pass from Kyle Rowley (Taylor Rowan kick), 11:04
- Cleveland – Russell Monk 2-yard run (Matt Denny kick), 6:39
- Spokane – Clay Harrell 1-yard run (Taylor Rowan kick), 3:53
- Cleveland – Joe Phinisee 22-yard pass from John Dutton (Matt Denny kick), 0:52

4th quarter

- Spokane – Huey Whittaker 16-yard pass from Kyle Rowley (Taylor Rowan kick), 8:50
- Cleveland – T.J. Watkins 1-yard run (Matt Denny kick), 1:22
- Cleveland – Brent Holmes 7-yard pass from John Dutton (Matt Denny kick), 0:26

Overtime

- Spokane – Travis Williams 43-yard interception return
- Spokane – Kyle Rowley: 25/38, 298 yards, 7 TD
- Cleveland – John Dutton: 27/45, 294 yards, 5 TD, 1 INT

Rushing

- Spokane – Kyle Rowley: 2 att, 15 yards
- Cleveland – Russell Monk: 3 att, 5 yards, 2 TD

Receiving

- Spokane – Huey Whittaker: 11 rec, 153 yards, 5 TD
- Cleveland – Anthony Jones: 5 rec, 95 yards, 2 TD

With their ninth straight win and a loss by the Arizona Rattlers, the Shock clinched the West Division.

=== Week 16: at Iowa Barnstormers ===
Quarter	1	2	3	4	Total
Shock	13	14	14	7	48
Barnstormers	7	14	7	14	42

at Wells Fargo Arena, Des Moines, Iowa

- Date: July 16
- Game time: 8:05 pm EDT
- Game attendance: 9,164
- Referee: Brad Van Vark
- Recap

Game information

1st quarter

- Spokane – Huey Whittaker 5-yard pass from Kyle Rowley (Taylor Rowan kick no good), 11:23
- Spokane – Kyle Rowley 9-yard run (Taylor Rowan kick), 3:17
- Iowa – Jesse Schmidt 28-yard pass from Ryan Vena (Jeff Glas kick), 0:27

2nd quarter

- Spokane – Shaun Kauleinamoku 21-yard pass from Kyle Rowley (Taylor Rowan kick), 12:47
- Spokane – Huey Whittaker 15-yard pass from Kyle Rowley (Taylor Rowan kick), 0:57
- Iowa – Rodney Filer 11-yard kickoff return (Jeff Glas kick), 0:55
- Iowa – Jesse Schmidt 13-yard pass from Ryan Vena (Jeff Glas kick), 0:00

3rd quarter

- Iowa – Jesse Schmidt 38-yard pass from Ryan Vena (Jeff Glas kick), 13:33
- Spokane – Shaun Kauleinamoku 34-yard pass from Kyle Rowley (Taylor Rowan kick), 9:20
- Spokane – Huey Whittaker 4-yard pass from Kyle Rowley (Taylor Rowan kick), 2:58

4th quarter

- Iowa – Rodney Filer 1-yard run (Jeff Glas kick), 13:05
- Spokane – Markee White 6-yard pass from Kyle Rowley (Taylor Rowan kick), 8:31
- Iowa – Errick McCown 5-yard pass from Ryan Vena (Jeff Glas kick), 0:55
- Spokane – Kyle Rowley: 26/37, 299 yards, 6 TD
- Iowa – Ryan Vena: 18/32, 209 yards, 4 TD

Rushing

- Spokane – Kyle Rowley: 4 att, 12 yards, 1 TD
- Iowa – Rodney Filer: 5 att, 21 yards, 1 TD

Receiving

- Spokane – Huey Whittaker: 11 rec, 104 yards, 3 TD
- Iowa – Jesse Schmidt: 10 rec, 148 yards, 3 TD

Improving their win streak to ten games, combined with a loss by the Chicago Rush, the Shock were certain to finish with the best record in the National Conference.

=== Week 17: vs. Chicago Rush ===
Quarter	1	2	3	4	Total
Rush	14	21	14	0	49
Shock	21	21	7	14	63

at Spokane Veterans Memorial Arena, Spokane, Washington

- Date: July 23
- Game time: 8:00 pm EDT
- Game attendance: 10,775
- Referee: Shane Anderson
- Recap

Game information

1st quarter

- Spokane – Ed Ta'amu 12-yard pass from Kyle Rowley (Taylor Rowan kick), 9:43
- Chicago – Syvelle Newton 35-yard pass from J.J. Raterink (Chris Gould kick), 8:03
- Spokane – Mervin Brookins 56-yard kickoff return (Taylor Rowan kick), 7:18
- Chicago – Nichiren Flowers 24-yard pass from J.J. Raterink (Chris Gould kick), 5:04
- Spokane – Shaun Kauleinamoku 16-yard pass from Kyle Rowley (Taylor Rowan kick), 3:09

2nd quarter

- Chicago – Syvelle Newton 11-yard pass from J.J. Raterink (Chris Gould kick), 14:23
- Spokane – Huey Whittaker 33-yard pass from Kyle Rowley (Taylor Rowan kick), 9:22
- Chicago – Allen Turner 9-yard run (Chris Gould kick), 6:28
- Spokane – Huey Whittaker 17-yard pass from Kyle Rowley (Taylor Rowan kick), 1:13
- Chicago – Nichiren Flowers 4-yard pass from J.J. Raterink (Chris Gould kick), 0:16
- Spokane – Markee White 19-yard pass from Kyle Rowley (Taylor Rowan kick), 0:08

3rd quarter

- Chicago – Syvelle Newton 22-yard pass from J.J. Raterink (Chris Gould kick), 9:52
- Spokane – Clay Harrell 1-yard run (Taylor Rowan kick), 6:38
- Chicago – Palauni Ma Sun 4-yard pass from J.J. Raterink (Chris Gould kick), 0:15

4th quarter

- Spokane – Huey Whittaker 5-yard pass from Kyle Rowley (Taylor Rowan kick), 11:00
- Spokane – Greg Orton 16-yard pass from Kyle Rowley (Taylor Rowan kick), 0:56

Passing

- Chicago – J.J. Raterink: 24/41, 294 yards, 6 TD, 1 INT
- Spokane – Kyle Rowley: 24/31, 323 yards, 7 TD

Rushing

- Chicago – Allen Turner: 2 att, 14 yards, 1 TD
- Spokane – Clay Harrell: 1 att, 1 yard, 1 TD

Receiving

- Chicago – Syvelle Newton: 8 rec, 139 yards, 3 TD
- Spokane – Markee White: 9 rec, 114 yards, 1 TD

=== Week 18: at Jacksonville Sharks ===
Quarter	1	2	3	4	Total
Shock	7	14	7	21	49
Sharks	14	19	14	17	64

at Jacksonville Veterans Memorial Arena, Jacksonville, Florida

- Date: July 30
- Game time: 7:30 pm EDT
- Game attendance: 13,000
- Recap

Game information

1st quarter

- Spokane – Markee White 22-yard pass from Kyle Rowley (Taylor Rowan kick), 8:01
- Jacksonville – Jason Willis 11-yard pass from Aaron Garcia (Paul Edinger kick), 4:50
- Jacksonville – Dallas Baker 10-yard pass from Aaron Garcia (Paul Edinger kick), 1:18

2nd quarter

- Spokane – Markee White 6-yard pass from Kyle Rowley (Taylor Rowan kick), 13:16
- Jacksonville – Jason Willis 3-yard pass from Aaron Garcia (Paul Edinger kick), 8:45
- Jacksonville – Jeff Littlejohn 47-yard fumble return (Paul Edinger kick no good), 5:14
- Spokane – Markee White 30-yard pass from Kyle Rowley (Taylor Rowan kick), 2:24
- Jacksonville – Bernard Morris 1-yard run (Paul Edinger kick no good), 0:02

3rd quarter

- Spokane – Markee White 4-yard pass from Kyle Rowley (Taylor Rowan kick), 7:19
- Jacksonville – Jeron Harvey 10-yard pass from Aaron Garcia (Paul Edinger kick), 6:04
- Jacksonville – Jeron Harvey 7-yard pass from Aaron Garcia (Paul Edinger kick), 0:48

4th quarter

- Spokane – Markee White 8-yard pass from Kyle Rowley (Markee White pass)
- Jacksonville – Paul Edinger 12-yard field goal
- Spokane – Huey Whittaker 31-yard pass from Brian Zbydniewski (Taylor Rowan kick), 6:38
- Jacksonville – Jeron Harvey 48-yard pass from Aaron Garcia (Paul Edinger kick), 5:12
- Spokane – Huey Whittaker 8-yard pass from Brian Zbydniewski (Taylor Rowan kick no good), 0:56
- Jacksonville – Jason Willis 24-yard pass from Aaron Garcia (Paul Edinger kick), 0:28
- Spokane – Kyle Rowley: 19/35, 275 yards, 5 TD, 2 INT
- Jacksonville – Aaron Garcia: 25/37, 293 yards, 7 TD

Rushing

- Spokane – Clay Harrell: 1 att, 0 yards
- Jacksonville – Bernard Morris: 3 att, 4 yards, 1 TD

Receiving

- Spokane – Huey Whittaker: 11 rec, 175 yards, 2 TD
- Jacksonville – Jason Willis: 9 rec, 102 yards, 3 TD

== Playoffs ==
=== National Conference Semifinals: vs. Arizona Rattlers ===
Quarter	1	2	3	4	Total
Rattlers	7	13	7	22	49
Shock	7	23	14	13	57

at Spokane Veterans Memorial Arena, Spokane, Washington

- Date: August 6
- Game time: 11:00 pm EDT
- Game attendance: 8,236
- Referee: Steve Strimling
- Recap

Game information

1st quarter

- Spokane – Markee White 6-yard pass from Kyle Rowley (Taylor Rowan kick), 8:48
- Arizona – Rod Windsor 27-yard pass from Nick Davila (Fabrizio Scaccia kick), 5:18

2nd quarter

- Spokane – Ed Ta'amu 6-yard pass from Kyle Rowley (Taylor Rowan kick no good), 9:16
- Arizona – Nick Davila 1-yard run (Fabrizio Scaccia kick), 4:44
- Spokane – Greg Orton 4-yard pass from Kyle Rowley (Taylor Rowan kick), 1:34
- Spokane – Huey Whittaker 3-yard pass from Kyle Rowley (Taylor Rowan kick), 0:31
- Arizona – Trandon Harvey 7-yard pass from Nick Davila (Fabrizio Scaccia kick no good)
- Spokane – Taylor Rowan 40-yard field goal, 0:00

3rd quarter

- Arizona – Rod Windsor 26-yard pass from Nick Davila (Fabrizio Scaccia kick), 14:05
- Spokane – Huey Whittaker 1-yard run (Taylor Rowan kick), 9:44
- Spokane – Huey Whittaker 21-yard pass from Kyle Rowley (Taylor Rowan kick), 1:01

4th quarter

- Arizona – Rod Windsor 6-yard pass from Nick Davila (Johnie Kirton run), 13:44
- Spokane – Markee White 3-yard pass from Kyle Rowley (Kyle Rowley run no good), 11:21
- Arizona – Rod Windsor 5-yard pass from Nick Davila (Fabrizio Scaccia kick), 8:15
- Spokane – Greg Orton 8-yard pass from Kyle Rowley (Taylor Rowan kick), 7:03
- Arizona – Rod Windsor 19-yard pass from Nick Davila (Fabrizio Scaccia kick), 4:43

Passing

- Arizona – Nick Davila: 25/43, 315 yards, 6 TD, 1 INT
- Spokane – Kyle Rowley: 25/37, 160 yards, 7 TD

Rushing

- Arizona – Nick Davila: 1 att, 1 yard, 1 TD
- Spokane – Kyle Rowley: 4 att, 21 yards

Receiving

- Arizona – Rod Windsor: 15 rec, 210 yards, 5 TD
- Spokane – Markee White: 10 rec, 66 yards, 2 TD

=== National Conference Championship: vs. Milwaukee Iron ===
Quarter	1	2	3	4	Total
Iron	7	16	21	13	57
Shock	23	16	7	14	60

at Spokane Veterans Memorial Arena, Spokane, Washington

- Date: August 12
- Game time: 8:00 pm EDT
- Game attendance: 8,151
- Referee: Shawn Hochuli
- Recap

Game information

1st quarter

- Spokane – Markee White 14-yard pass from Kyle Rowley (Taylor Rowan kick), 11:03
- Milwaukee – Antoine Burns 57-yard kickoff return (Robert Forstrom kick), 10:15
- Spokane – Huey Whittaker 2-yard run (Taylor Rowan kick), 6:30
- Spokane – Safety, 5:37
- Spokane – Huey Whittaker 12-yard pass from Kyle Rowley (Taylor Rowan kick), 2:50

2nd quarter

- Milwaukee – Robert Forstrom 17-yard field goal, 13:24
- Spokane – Ed Ta'amu 6-yard pass from Kyle Rowley (Taylor Rowan kick no good), 10:01
- Milwaukee – Damian Harrell 6-yard pass from Chris Greisen (Robert Forstrom kick), 5:14
- Spokane – Huey Whittaker 4-yard pass from Kyle Rowley (Taylor Rowan kick), 1:27
- Milwaukee – Anthony Jones 5-yard pass from Chris Greisen (Robert Forstrom kick no good)
- Spokane – Taylor Rowan 22-yard field goal

3rd quarter

- Milwaukee – Tyre Young 1-yard run (Robert Forstrom kick), 10:13
- Milwaukee – Richard Ranglin 4-yard pass from Chris Greisen (Robert Forstrom kick), 7:26
- Spokane – Huey Whittaker 15-yard pass from Kyle Rowley (Taylor Rowan kick), 5:52
- Milwaukee – Anthony Jones 7-yard pass from Chris Greisen (Robert Forstrom kick), 0:00

4th quarter

- Spokane – Markee White 5-yard pass from Kyle Rowley (Taylor Rowan kick), 9:44
- Milwaukee – Tyre Young 7-yard pass from Chris Greisen (Damian Harrell pass no good), 7:48
- Spokane – Huey Whittaker 5-yard pass from Kyle Rowley (Taylor Rowan kick), 1:59
- Milwaukee – Tyre Young 1-yard run (Robert Forstrom kick), 0:35

Passing

- Milwaukee – Chris Greisen: 24/31, 235 yards, 5 TD
- Spokane – Kyle Rowley: 28/37, 334 yards, 7 TD

Rushing

- Milwaukee – Tyre Young: 5 att, 6 yards, 2 TD
- Spokane – Huey Whittaker: 2 att, 6 yards, 1 TD

Receiving

- Milwaukee – Antoine Burns: 8 rec, 84 yards
- Spokane – Huey Whittaker: 14 rec, 165 yards, 4 TD

=== ArenaBowl XXIII: vs. Tampa Bay Storm ===
Quarter	1	2	3	4	Total
Storm	7	21	7	22	57
Shock	6	28	14	21	69

at Spokane Veterans Memorial Arena, Spokane, Washington

- Date: August 20
- Game time: 8:00 pm EDT
- Game attendance: 11,017
