= Richard Clebert =

American football player (born 1985)

No. 93
- Position: Defensive lineman

Personal information
- Born: November 15, 1985 (age 40); Queens, New York, U.S.
- Listed height: 6 ft 1 in (1.85 m)
- Listed weight: 312 lb (142 kg)

Career information
- High school: Edison (Miami, Florida)
- College: South Florida
- NFL draft: 2008: undrafted

Career history
- New York Sentinels (2009); Spokane Shock (2010); Jacksonville Sharks (2011); Tampa Bay Storm (2011); Milwaukee Mustangs (2011); Orlando Predators (2012); Tampa Bay Buccaneers (2013)*; Tampa Bay Storm (2014–2015); Orlando Predators (2016); Philadelphia Soul (2016)
- * Offseason or practice squad member only

Awards and highlights
- 3× ArenaBowl champion (2010, 2011, 2016)

Career AFL statistics
- Total tackles: 77
- Sacks: 20.5
- Forced fumbles: 3
- Fumble recoveries: 3
- Pass deflections: 2
- Stats at ArenaFan.com
- Stats at Pro Football Reference

Richard Clebert (born November 15, 1985) is an American former professional football defensive lineman who played in the Arena Football League (AFL). He played college football at South Florida.

== Early life ==
A native of Miami, Clebert attended Miami Edison Senior High School. He was part of the "Edison Five" who signed with South Florida in 2004, along with running back Chad Simpson, tackle Marc Dile, and receiver Jackie Chambers. Regarded as a three-star recruit, he was listed as the No. 50 defensive tackle available in his class.

== College career ==
Clebert was a three-year starter at nose tackle for South Florida. He had 22 tackles as a junior, and 31 as senior. Known for his weight room prowess, he reportedly bench-pressed 225 pounds 43 times.

== Professional career ==
=== 2008 NFL draft ===
Clebert was graded as the 31st defensive tackle available in the 2008 NFL draft by Sports Illustrated. In a draft that saw 18 defensive tackles selected, he went undrafted. In the off-season, he tried out for the New Orleans Saints but did not earn a contract.

He was signed by the Tampa Bay Buccaneers on January 24, 2013, and was released on May 6, 2013.

=== Arena football ===
Clebert played for six teams in the Arena Football League, and won three ArenaBowls. With the Spokane Shock in 2010, he recovered a fumble in ArenaBowl XXIII to set up a Spokane touchdown. He was also part of the Jacksonville Sharks team that won ArenaBowl XXIV in 2011. On December 28, 2015, Clebert was assigned to the Orlando Predators. He was traded to the Philadelphia Soul for future considerations on April 16, 2016.
