= Brian Zbydniewski =

American football player (born 1981)

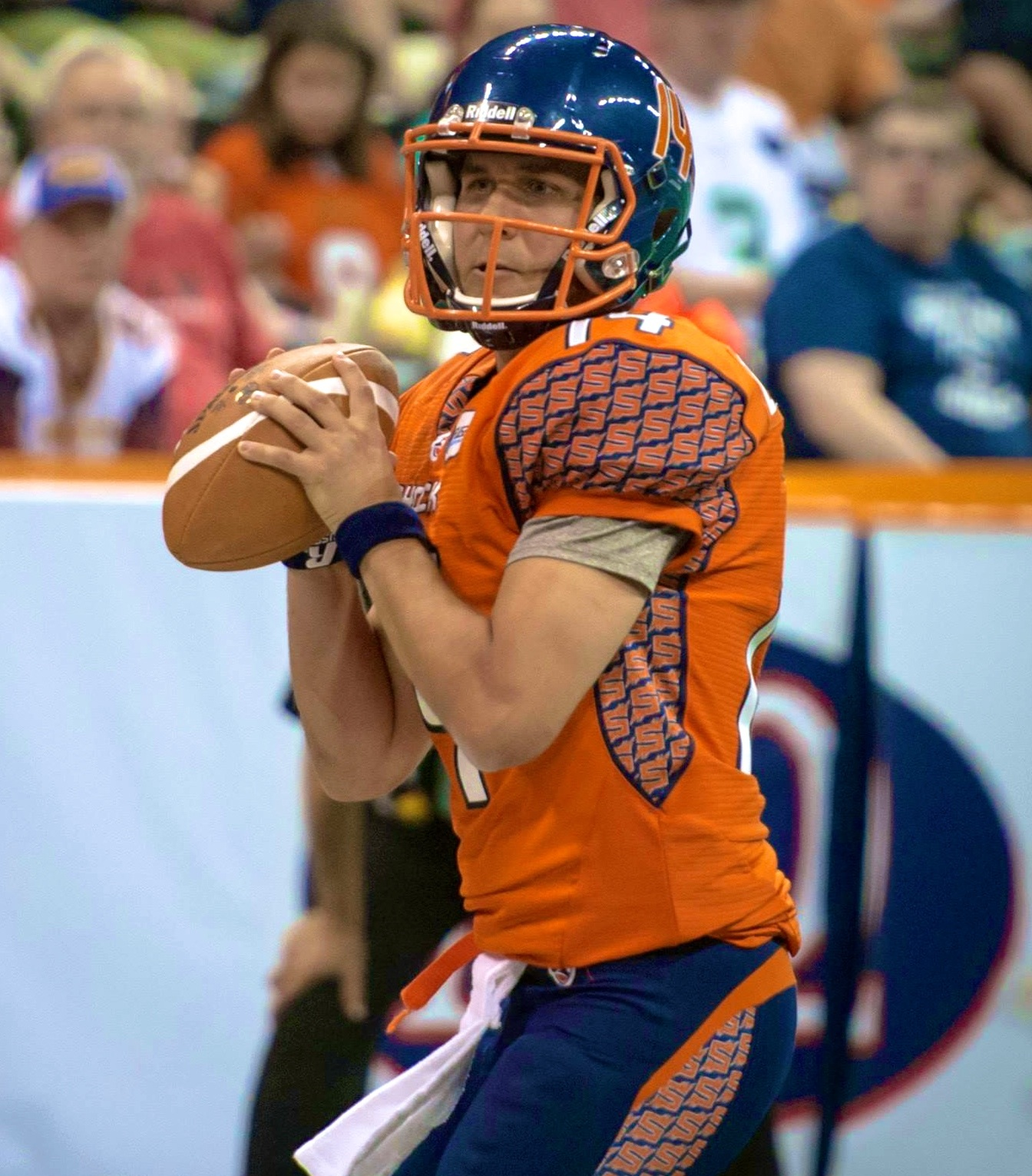
- Zbydniewski with the Spokane Shock in 2014

No. 3, 14, 11, 17
- Position: Quarterback

Personal information
- Born: September 15, 1981 (age 45); Beaufort, South Carolina, U.S.
- Listed height: 6 ft 1 in (1.85 m)
- Listed weight: 215 lb (98 kg)

Career information
- High school: Fort Walton Beach (FL) Choctawhatchee
- College: Belhaven
- NFL draft: 2005: undrafted

Career history
- South Georgia Wildcats (2005); Spokane Shock (2006); Manchester Wolves (2007); Quad City Steamwheelers (2009); Spokane Shock (2010); Tampa Bay Storm (2011); New Orleans VooDoo (2012); Cleveland Gladiators (2013–2014); Spokane Shock (2014); Los Angeles KISS (2015); Orlando Predators (2015)

Awards and highlights
- ArenaBowl champion (2010); Second-team All-American (2003); MSC Player of the Year (2003); MSC Offensive Player of the Year (2003); NAIA total offense champion (2003); NAIA all-time All-American (2003)

Career AFL statistics
- Comp. / Att.: 532 / 914
- Passing yards: 6,504
- TD–INT: 116–43
- QB rating: 92.36
- Rushing TD: 11
- Stats at ArenaFan.com

Brian David Zbydniewski, Jr. (/Zeb-ah-new-ski/; born September 15, 1981) is an American former professional football quarterback who played in the Arena Football League (AFL) and af2 from 2005 to 2015. Zbydniewski played college football at Belhaven University. During his collegiate career, Zbydniewski set numerous single-game, season, and career passing records. Zbydniewski was inducted into Belhaven's Athletics Hall of Fame in 2022.

== Early life ==
Zbydniewski was born on September 15, 1981, in Beaufort, South Carolina, the son of Brian and Janet Zbydniewski. He has two sisters and two brothers. He was raised Christian, and is of Polish (father) descent. Zbydniewski has mentioned Kurt Warner as one of his inspirations. Zbydniewski attended Choctawhatchee High School in Fort Walton Beach, Florida. Zbydniewski excelled as a student athlete and played football, basketball, and baseball.

== College career ==
Zbydniewski graduated from Belhaven University with a degree in Business Administration, and was a starting quarterback for the Belhaven Blazers football team.

Zbydniewski set or tied single-game, season, and career records during his years with the Blazers at Belhaven. He earned numerous awards including All-Time All American, Offensive Player of the Year, Total Offense Champion, Pre-Season "Super Six", First-Team Mid-South Conference Offensive Player, Second-Team All American and was nominated alongside Eli Manning and Rod Davis for the Conerly Trophy Award in 2003 after completing 311 passes for 3,888 yards.

Zbydniewski led the nation in passing and total yards in 2003, throwing for 3,888 yards and completing 65% of passes. Currently ranks fourth all time in single-season passing yards per game.

Prior to receiving an athletic scholarship to attend Belhaven University, Zbydniewski attended East Central Community College. During his freshman year at East Central, he was invited to participate in the Mississippi Junior College All-Star game.

== Professional career ==
=== af2 (2005–2009) ===
Zbydniewski began his professional career with the South Georgia Wildcats of the af2. In 2006, Zbydniewski joined the expansion Spokane Shock. In 2007, he was a member of the Manchester Wolves. In 2009, he played with the Quad City Steamwheelers.

=== Arena Football League (2010–2015) ===
==== Spokane Shock (2010) ====
He completed 5-of-12 passes for 119 yards and two touchdowns as a rookie with the Shock and was a part of the ArenaBowl XXIII World Championship team.

==== Tampa Bay Storm (2011) ====
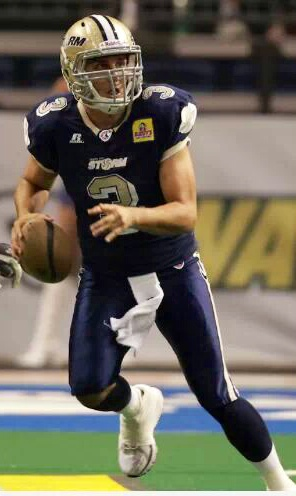
In action for the Storm

Passed for 2,825 yards and 56 touchdowns in 11 games with the Tampa Bay Storm. Earned Offensive Player of the Week after completing eight touchdowns for 372 yards.

==== New Orleans VooDoo (2012) ====
Saw action in four games for the New Orleans VooDoo, |url completing 4-of-13 passes for 65 yards, one touchdown and two interceptions.

==== Cleveland Gladiators (2013–2014) ====
In 2013, Zbydniewski completed 178-of-310 passes for 2,001 yards and 34 touchdowns in nine games with the Cleveland Gladiators. Earned Offensive Player of the Week after completing 24-of-33 passes for 316 yards and eight touchdowns in Cleveland's 64–57 overtime victory. Zbydniewski completed 72.7 percent of his passes in the contest. He also rushed for a score for the third time in four games.

Zbydniewski spent the first part of the 2014 season in rehab for a clavicle fracture.

==== Spokane Shock (2014) ====
Completed 106-of-183 passes for 1,251 yards and 17 touchdowns in seven games with the Spokane Shock. The Spokane Shock acquired Zbydniewski in a trade from the Cleveland Gladiators on May 20, 2014.

==== Los Angeles KISS (2015) ====
On March 3, 2015, Zbydniewski was assigned to the Los Angeles KISS. He started for the KISS during their Week 5 game against the Arizona Rattlers, after starting quarterback Adrian McPherson, was placed on injured reserve. Zbydinewski suffered an upper-body injury in the game's final minutes. He was placed on recallable reassignment on April 28, 2015.

==== Orlando Predators (2015) ====
On May 6, 2015, Zbydniewski was assigned to the Orlando Predators.

=== AFL statistics ===
Legend
	Won the ArenaBowl
**Bold**	Career high

Year	Team	Passing							Rushing		
Year	Team	Cmp	Att	Pct	Yds	TD	Int	Rtg	Att	Yds	TD
2010	Spokane	5	12	41.7	119	2	1	82.99	1	-1	0
2011	Tampa Bay	**221**	**357**	**61.9**	**2,825**	**56**	**15**	**108.35**	10	-1	0
2012	New Orleans	4	13	30.8	65	1	2	28.21	0	0	0
2013	Cleveland	178	311	57.2	2,001	34	14	85.16	14	**42**	**6**
2014	Spokane	106	183	57.9	1,251	17	8	83.85	**21**	9	5
2015	Los Angeles	18	38	47.4	243	6	3	74.78	3	5	0
Career		532	914	58.2	6,504	116	43	92.36	49	54	11

== Personal life ==
Zbydniewski married his college sweetheart Tiffany Campbell in July 2017 in Palm Beach, Florida. Campbell is a professional actress and philanthropist. The couple have a dog named Coconut. Zbydniewski is often known by his nickname "Zeb" acquired from teammates and fans.

== Coaching career ==
In 2015, Zbydniewski retired as a player and pursued coaching. He is a recruiting assistant, scouting high school students nationwide, and is the founder of Zeb's Field Pass.
