= Taylor Rowan =

American football player (born 1987)

No. 6, 13, 16, 1
- Position: Kicker

Personal information
- Born: January 12, 1987 (age 39); Melbourne, Florida, U.S.
- Listed height: 6 ft 0 in (1.83 m)
- Listed weight: 190 lb (86 kg)

Career information
- High school: Melbourne (FL)
- College: Western Illinois
- NFL draft: 2009: undrafted

Career history
- Arkansas Twisters (2009); New York Sentinels (2009); Spokane Shock (2010–2011, 2013–2015)

Awards and highlights
- ArenaBowl champion (2010)

Career AFL statistics
- FG Made: 20
- FG Att: 37
- PAT Made: 537
- PAT Att: 614
- Total tackles: 14.5
- Stats at ArenaFan.com

Taylor Rowan (born January 12, 1987) is an American former football placekicker. He has also played in the AF2 with the Arkansas Twisters, and played with the United Football League (UFL)'s New York Sentinels.

== College career ==
Rowan played Football at Western Illinois University, NCAA Div IAA, Macomb, Illinois. He was a four-year starter and was the first true freshman WIU placekicker since 1990. He set numerous WIU Freshman kicking records including, tying the record for most Points after touchdown (PATs) in a game by a freshman. His freshman season he broke the record for most consecutive PATs in a Season (47). His first collegiate field goal broke the record for longest field goal by a freshman in school history (47 yards). Over the next three (3) years, he was named All-American twice (The Sports network and College Sporting News), National player of the Week 3 times, Gateway Conference (currently Missouri Valley Football Conference) Player of the Week 3 times, WIU Special teams player of the Year 3 times and All-Conference. He Shares the WIU record for longest Field goal with Mike Scrifres at 56 yards and holds the record for longest field goal at Hanson field (56 yards). He also holds the WIU and Gateway Conference single-season record for the most 50-plus-yard field goals in a single season, connecting on six of eight tries from 50-plus yards. He was just two 50-yard field goals from tying the all-time NCAA record of 11 for his career. In his senior campaign, he broke and then set the NCAA FCS record for most consecutive PATs (formerly held by Chris Snyder of Montana State), scoring on 129 tries without a miss. He eventually finished his career at 160/162 PATs having 2 blocked his senior season. In his college career he set or tied a total of 16 school, conference and national records. In 2010 he was named to the Missouri Valley, Silver Anniversary Team.

== Professional career ==
After going undrafted in 2008, Rowan signed with the AF2 Arkansas Twisters. He also played the last game of the 2009 UFL schedule for the now defunct New York Sentinels. In 2010, Rowan was signed by the Spokane Shock of the Arena Football League (AFL). He led the AFL, connecting on 140 PAT's including the AFL playoffs. He finished the season hitting 100% of his FG tries, including a long of 40 yards in the AFL playoffs. Spokane defeated the Tampa Bay Storm to win the ArenaBowl XXIII Championship. Rowan would kick for the Shock again in 2011. After taking 2012 off, Rowan returned to the Shock in 2013 and kicked for them until 2015.
