= James Ruffin =

James Ruffin may refer to:

- James E. Ruffin (1893–1977), US representative from Missouri
- James Ruffin (American football) (born 1987), American football defensive end
