= Adam Juratovac =

American football player and attorney (born 1987)

No. 62, 94
- Position: Guard

Personal information
- Born: April 10, 1987 (age 39); Palo Alto, California, U.S.
- Listed height: 6 ft 3 in (1.91 m)
- Listed weight: 295 lb (134 kg)

Career information
- High school: Gunn (Palo Alto(
- College: Idaho
- NFL draft: 2010: undrafted

Career history
- Spokane Shock (2010); San Jose SaberCats (2011)

Awards and highlights
- ArenaBowl champion (2010)

Career AFL statistics
- Receptions: 3
- Receiving yards: 35
- Tackles: 1
- Stats at ArenaFan.com

Adam Stanislaus Juratovac (born April 10, 1987) is an American former football lineman. He played for the Spokane Shock and San Jose SaberCats of the Arena Football League (AFL), winning ArenaBowl XXIII with the Shock. He played college football at Idaho.

== Early life ==
Juratovac graduated from Gunn High School in (Palo Alto, California). He was a letterman in football, wrestling, and track. In football, as a senior, Juratovac was named Team MVP, won First Team All-League, Second Team All-Metro, and Second Team All-State. He was a 2-star football recruit coming out of high school. In wrestling, he was a State Qualifier (CA) and placed Top-12.

== College career ==
Juratovac was a three-year starter for the Vandals. His career culminated in a last-second 2009 Humanitarian Bowl win over Bowling Green State. During his college career, he was a four-time Western Athletic Conference (WAC) Academic All-Conference selection and won the WAC Scholar-Athlete Award four times. He also won the Kathy Clark Scholar-Athlete Award in 2010.

In 2005, Juratovac redshirted and earned Offensive Scout Team Player of the Year honors. He made his first career start on September 2, 2006, against the Michigan St. Spartans. He played in all 12 games and shared the starting right guard position with Marcis Fennell. In 2007, he played in 11 of 12 games and shared the starting right guard position with graduated senior Fennell. Recorded one kick off return for 7 yards in a loss to the New Mexico St. Aggies. In 2008, he played in all 12 games as a backup lineman and on special teams. In 2009, he started in 13 games as the right guard for an offense that ranked 20th in the nation in scoring offense. He was the 5th ranked kickoff/punt returner on the team.

== Professional career ==
Juratovac played for the Spokane Shock in 2010 and the San Jose SaberCats in 2011. He retired from football in 2011 after a career-ending injury.

== Personal life ==
Juratovac is the founder of AthletesLTD, a "platform that allows athletes to share their stories for the benefit of their communities". He has been featured on news outlets for athlete advocacy including: The Huffington Post, Adweek, and Next Impulse Sports. He is also a lawyer.
