= ArenaBowl XXIV =

Annual league championship game

Jacksonville Sharks (American)	Arizona Rattlers (National)
73	70
	1	2	3	4	Total
JAX	12	20	6	35	73
ARI	14	21	7	28	70
- Date: August 12, 2011
- Stadium: US Airways Center; Phoenix, Arizona
- MVP: Aaron Garcia, Jacksonville: Chris Jackson, Arizona (Offensive Player of the Game); Micheaux Robinson, Jacksonville (Defensive Player of the Game); Jason Holman, Jacksonville (Ironman of the Game)
- Attendance: 14,320
- Winning coach: Les Moss, Jacksonville
- Losing coach: Kevin Guy, Arizona

TV in the United States
- Network: NFL Network
- Announcers: Paul Burmeister, Kurt Warner, Anthony Herron, Ari Wolfe

ArenaBowl XXIV was the 24th edition of the championship in the Arena Football League (AFL). The American Conference champion, Jacksonville Sharks, defeated the National Conference champion, Arizona Rattlers, 73–70. It was played on August 12, 2011. The game was hosted at the site of the highest remaining seed throughout the playoffs, which was US Airways Center in Phoenix, Arizona, home of the Rattlers.

== Site ==
The ArenaBowl was scheduled to be played at the site of the highest seed who reaches the championship. Arizona finished with the best record during the regular season. In an interview with AFL Insider on May 9, AFL Commissioner Jerry Kurz said playing ArenaBowl XXV in 2012 at a neutral site is a strong option. The ArenaBowl was played at the highest seed in the game since the AFL's inception in 1987 until 2004. From 2005 to 2008, it was at a neutral site, Las Vegas and New Orleans. In 2010, the ArenaBowl returned to the highest remaining seed setting, as ArenaBowl XXIII was played at the Spokane Arena, home of the Spokane Shock, who won the game.

== Television ==
ArenaBowl XXIV was televised on NFL Network. The game was the highest watched Arena Football League game on the NFL Network, earning a 0.37 rating. That was up 200 percent from ArenaBowl XXIII on NFL Network. The previous record was set a week before when the 2011 AFL American Conference Championship game earned a 0.32 rating between the Georgia Force and Jacksonville Sharks, with the Sharks winning 64–55.

== Logo contest ==
The Arena Football League had fans design the logo for ArenaBowl XXIV in a contest. The league office picked four finalists and fans voted online.

The winner was Myk Crawford, a Spokane Shock fan from Spokane, Washington, which was announced on April 11, 2011.

== Background ==
=== Pregame ===
The story heading into ArenaBowl XXIV was that of Sharks QB Aaron Garcia. At 40 years old, this would be Garcia's first appearance in an ArenaBowl. Garcia began his AFL career in 1995. He holds many of the AFL's all-time passing records and ended the 2011 season with over 50,000 passing and 1,078 career touchdown passes. But with all the stats, he had yet to even play in an AFL championship game before 2011.

2011 was arguably Garcia's best season. He finished the year with a 71.5 completion percentage, 125.24 QB rating and 116 touchdown passes, and 4,933 yards, all career highs.

The Rattlers featured second year AFL QB Nick Davila, who topped Garcia with 117 passing touchdowns during the season. He also completed over 70 percent of his passes and threw over 4,900 yards.

His go-to receiver was Rod Windsor, who had caught 156 passes for 1,830 yards during the season. Windsor was a member of the Cleveland Browns roster during the AFL regular season, but was able to play due to the 2011 NFL lockout. However, the lockout ended just days before ArenaBowl XXIV, and he did not play in the title game.

=== Arizona Rattlers ===
The Rattlers finished the regular season with a league-record 16 wins, and entered the game with an 11-game winning streak, including the playoffs. This was their first ArenaBowl appearance since 2004 when they lost ArenaBowl XVIII. They advanced to the ArenaBowl after defeating the Spokane Shock in the conference semifinals, and the Chicago Rush in the conference championship.

Week	Date	Opponent	Result
1	March 12	at Jacksonville	W 55–52
2	March 19	Milwaukee	W 62–31
3	March 28	at Tulsa	W 69–20
4	April 2	Orlando	W 48–47
5	Bye		
6	April 16	at Kansas City	W 63–49
7	April 23	Utah	W 67–61 (OT)
8	April 30	at Spokane	L 69–70
9	May 7	at San Jose	W 65–43
10	May 14	Chicago	L 49–50
11	May 20	at New Orleans	W 61–53
12	May 28	Cleveland	W 63–42
13	June 4	at Utah	W 72–37
14	June 11	Iowa	W 61–41
15	June 18	San Jose	W 64–57
16	June 25	at Philadelphia	W 55–54
17	July 2	Spokane	W 68–46
18	July 10	at Pittsburgh	W 68–34
19	Bye		
20	July 23	at Dallas	W 55–49
–	July 29	Spokane	W 62–33
–	August 6	Chicago	W 54–48

=== Jacksonville Sharks ===
The Sharks, in just their second year of existence, finished the regular season with a 14–4 record and had the best record in the American Conference, defeating the Orlando Predators and Georgia Force, respectively, to advance to their first ArenaBowl. For 17-year veteran quarterback Aaron Garcia, this was his first ArenaBowl.

Week	Date	Opponent	Result
1	March 12	Arizona	L 52–55
2	March 19	Georgia	W 71–57
3	March 28	New Orleans	W 64–33
4	April 1	at Tampa Bay	W 54–30
5	Bye		
6	April 16	at Pittsburgh	W 65–40
7	April 23	Cleveland	W 56–42
8	April 30	Orlando	W 76–55
9	May 6	at Philadelphia	W 58–42
10	May 13	Iowa	W 79–27
11	May 21	at Georgia	W 62–55
12	Bye		
13	June 3	at New Orleans	W 62–55
14	June 11	at Orlando	W 68–67
15	June 18	Milwaukee	W 62–47
16	June 25	Tampa Bay	W 66–41
17	July 2	at San Jose	L 70–83
18	July 9	Dallas	L 70–75
19	July 15	at Kansas City	L 48–49 (OT)
20	July 22	Spokane	W 75–56
–	July 29	Orlando	W 63–48
–	August 8	Georgia	W 64–55

== Game summary ==
ArenaBowl XXIV went down as one of the best ArenaBowls in AFL history with Jacksonville Sharks quarterback Aaron Garcia throwing the game-winning touchdown pass to wide receiver Jeron Harvey on the final play of the game.

The Arizona Rattlers drew first blood in ArenaBowl XXIV with a two-yard run by Odie Armstrong giving the Rattlers a 7–0 lead. The teams traded touchdowns throughout the first quarter, but two missed PATs by Jacksonville gave the Rattlers a 14–12 lead. However, the Sharks got a stop and scored in between the first two quarters and took their first lead to open the second quarter, 19–14.

After both teams scored two touchdowns each in the first quarter, the teams each scored three of their own in the second quarter. However, the Rattlers scored two touchdowns in the final 55 seconds of the half, and Jacksonville kicker Marco Capozzoli missed his third PAT of the game.

The Sharks led 32–21 with less than three minutes before half, but Arizona came back to take a 35–32 lead midway through the game.

In the third quarter, both teams each scored a touchdown, but after Capozzoli's fourth and final missed PAT, the Rattlers led 42–38. The fourth quarter of ArenaBowl XXIV saw nine touchdowns and seven lead changes, with five touchdowns coming in the last 1:30.

The Rattlers led 56–53 before Garcia hit Harvey to give the Sharks a 60–56 lead with 1:26. The Rattlers retook the lead after a five-yard TD pass from QB Nick Davila to WR Chris Jackson at the 52 second mark. Twelve seconds later, Garcia hit Jomo Wilson and the Sharks led 67–63.

It appeared Arizona would score the game-winning touchdowns after Davila hit Kerry Reed with a 12-yard pass with 21 seconds left in the game, until Garcia threw the game winning pass to give Jacksonville its first ArenaBowl title (in its second season in the AFL) with a 10-yard TD pass to Jeron Harvey with no time on the clock.

== Box score ==
Quarter	1	2	3	4	Total
Sharks (AC)	12	20	6	35	73
Rattlers (NC)	14	21	7	28	70

at US Airways Center, Phoenix, Arizona

- Date: August 12, 2011
- Game time: 8:30 p.m. EDT
- Game attendance: 14,320
- Referee: Shawn Hochuli

Scoring summary

Quarter	Time	Drive			Team	Scoring information	Score	
Quarter	Time	Plays	Yards	TOP	Team	Scoring information	Sharks	Rattlers
1	11:32	6 plays	43 yards	3:28	ARI	Odie Armstrong 2-yard touchdown run, Jason Witczak kick good	0	7
1	10:23	1 play	41 yards	0:35	JAX	Jomo Wilson 41-yard touchdown reception from Aaron Garcia, Marco Capozzoli kick no good	6	7
1	5:32	5 plays	42 yards	4:13	ARI	Kerry Reed 20-yard touchdown reception from Nick Davila, Jason Witczak kick good	6	14
1	2:45	3 plays	38 yards	2:45	JAX	Jeron Harvey 11-yard touchdown reception from Aaron Garcia, Marco Capozzoli kick no good	12	14
2	12:42	6 plays	37 yards	4:26	JAX	Fumble recovery returned 0 yards for touchdown by Jomo Wilson, Marco Capozzoli kick good	19	14
2	7:40	8 plays	49 yards	4:52	ARI	Chris Jackson 4-yard touchdown reception from Nick Davila, Jason Witczak kick good	19	21
2	5:17	3 plays	45 yards	2:11	JAX	Jeff Hughley 31-yard touchdown reception from Aaron Garcia, Marco Capozzoli kick good	26	21
2	2:54	3 plays	8 yards	1:54	JAX	Jamarko Simmons 1-yard touchdown run, 2-point pass failed	32	21
2	0:55	4 plays	45 yards	1:18	ARI	Chris Jackson 18-yard touchdown reception from Nick Davila, Jason Witczak kick good	32	28
2	0:12	6 plays	46 yards	0:29	ARI	Jason Geathers 16-yard touchdown reception from Nick Davila, Jason Witczak kick good	32	35
3	6:09	1 plays	9 yards	0:16	ARI	Odie Armstrong 9-yard touchdown reception from Nick Davila, Jason Witczak kick good	32	42
3	1:56	6 plays	29 yards	3:30	JAX	Jamarko Simmons 3-yard touchdown reception from Aaron Garcia, Marco Capozzoli kick no good	38	42
4	13:21	4 plays	40 yards	3:08	ARI	Odie Armstrong 1-yard touchdown run, Jason Witczak kick good	38	49
4	9:59	4 plays	45 yards	2:43	JAX	Jamarko Simmons 7-yard touchdown reception from Aaron Garcia, Marco Capozzoli kick good	45	49
4	5:22	4 plays	29 yards	2:36	JAX	Kirby Griffin 4-yard touchdown run, 2-point pass good	53	49
4	3:58	1 play	17 yards	0:38	ARI	Jason Geathers 17-yard touchdown reception from Nick Davila, Jason Witczak kick good	53	56
4	1:26	3 plays	47 yards	1:50	JAX	Jeron Harvey 45-yard touchdown reception from Aaron Garcia, Marco Capozzoli kick good	60	56
4	0:52	1 play	5 yards	0:05	ARI	Chris Jackson 5-yard touchdown reception from Nick Davila, Jason Witczak kick good	60	63
4	0:40	3 plays	11 yards	0:12	JAX	Jomo Wilson 11-yard touchdown reception from Aaron Garcia, Marco Capozzoli kick good	67	63
4	0:21	3 plays	37 yards	0:19	ARI	Kerry Reed 12-yard touchdown reception from Nick Davila, Jason Witczak kick good	67	70
4	0:00	3 plays	27 yards	0:21	JAX	Jeron Harvey 10-yard touchdown reception from Aaron Garcia, Marco Capozzoli kick not attempted	73	70
"TOP" = time of possession. For other American football terms, see Glossary of American football.							73	70
