= Adron Tennell =

American football player (born 1987)

No. 17
- Position: Wide receiver

Personal information
- Born: September 11, 1987 (age 39); Irving, Texas, U.S.
- Listed height: 6 ft 4 in (1.93 m)
- Listed weight: 215 lb (98 kg)

Career information
- High school: Irving
- College: Oklahoma
- NFL draft: 2010: undrafted

Career history
- Spokane Shock (2011–2014); San Jose SaberCats (2015)

Awards and highlights
- ArenaBowl champion (2015); First-team All-Arena (2013); AFL WR of the Year (2013)

Career AFL statistics
- Receptions: 460
- Receiving yards: 5,246
- Receiving touchdowns: 134
- Rushing touchdowns: 7
- Stats at ArenaFan.com

Adron Tennell (born September 11, 1987) is an American former football wide receiver. He played college football at Oklahoma. He was considered one of the top wide receiver recruits in 2006.

== Early life ==
Tennell attended Irving High School in Irving, Texas. There, he was a standout member of the football team being ranked as the No. 7 recruit at the wide receiver position.

College recruiting
Name	Hometown	School	Height	Weight	40^{‡}	Commit date
Adron Tennell; WR	Irving, Texas	Irving High School	6 ft 5 in (1.96 m)	215 lb (98 kg)	4.43	Jul 21, 2005
Adron Tennell; WR	Recruit ratings: Scout: Rivals:					
Overall recruit ranking: Scout: 10 (WR) Rivals: 3 (WR), 42 (Nation), 5 (TX)
Note: In many cases, Scout, Rivals, 247Sports, On3, and ESPN may conflict in their listings of height and weight.; In these cases, the average was taken. ESPN grades are on a 100-point scale.; Sources: "Oklahoma Football Commitments". Rivals.; "2006 Oklahoma Football Commits". Scout.; "Scout.com Team Recruiting Rankings". Scout.; "2006 Team Ranking". Rivals.com.

Tennell committed to the University of Oklahoma on July 21, 2005. Tennell chose Oklahoma over football scholarships from Mississippi State, Oklahoma State, SMU, TCU, Texas A&M & Texas Tech.

== College career ==
Tennell played four seasons for the Sooners, and he started his last year there.

== Professional career ==
=== Spokane Shock ===
Tennell signed with the Spokane Shock of the Arena Football League before the 2011 season.

Tennell remained a member of the Shock during the 2012 season.

Tennell had a big 2013 season for the Shock, earning first-team All-Arena honors, leading the league in both receptions (156) and receiving touchdowns (49). In addition, Tennell was named the AFL's Wide Receiver of the Year.

Tennell missed most of the 2014 season with an injury.

=== San Jose SaberCats ===
On November 21, 2014, Tennell was assigned to the San Jose SaberCats.
