= Kenny Spencer =

American football player (born 1986)

No. 1
- Position: Placekicker

Personal information
- Born: October 15, 1986 (age 40)
- Listed height: 6 ft 1 in (1.85 m)
- Listed weight: 200 lb (91 kg)

Career information
- High school: Glenwood (Glenwood, Iowa)
- College: North Alabama
- NFL draft: 2010: undrafted

Career history
- Alabama Hammers (2011); Spokane Shock (2012); Virginia Destroyers (2012); Spokane Shock (2013); New Orleans VooDoo (2013); Los Angeles Kiss (2014–2015); Arizona Rattlers (2016); Albany Empire (2018); Philadelphia Soul (2019)

Awards and highlights
- First-team All-Arena (2012); AFL Kicker of the Year (2012); First-team All-GSC (2009)
- Stats at ArenaFan.com

Kenny Spencer (born October 15, 1986) is an American former professional football placekicker who played seven seasons in the Arena Football League (AFL) with the Spokane Shock, New Orleans VooDoo, Los Angeles Kiss, Arizona Rattlers, Albany Empire, and Philadelphia Soul. He played college football at the University of North Alabama. He also played for the Virginia Destroyers of the United Football League (UFL).

== Early life and college ==
Kenny Spencer was born on October 15, 1986. He attended Glenwood High School in Glenwood, Iowa.

Spencer first played two years of college football at Ellsworth Community College. He then transferred to play for the North Alabama Lions of the University of North Alabama, where he was a letterman in 2007 and 2009. In September 2009, he was named the Gulf South Conference (GSC) player of the week after making nine of nine kicks (two field goals and seven extra points) in a 55–7 victory over West Georgia. Spencer earned first-team All-GSC honors as a senior in 2009 after converting 12 of 17 field goals and 63 of 66 extra points. He graduated from North Alabama with a bachelor's degree in criminal justice.

== Professional career ==
Spencer played for the Alabama Hammers of the Southern Indoor Football League in 2011.

On March 4, 2012, Spencer was assigned to the Spokane Shock of the Arena Football League (AFL). He was reassigned on March 6 and activated again on March 7, 2012. As a rookie in 2012, he converted four of seven field goals and 138 of 146 extra points while also catching one pass for a two-yard touchdown. Spencer's 138 extra points set an AFL single-season record. He was named first-team All-Arena and the AFL Kicker of the Year for his performance during the 2012 season.

Spencer played in all four games for the Virginia Destroyers of the United Football League (UFL) during the 2012 UFL season, converting four of eight field goals and six of six extra points while also kicking off 16 times for 980 yards.

On November 7, 2012, Spencer was assigned to the Shock again for the 2013 season. He was placed on the refused to report list on March 2, 2013, but was later activated on March 18. He was placed on the suspended list on April 10, 2013, and placed on reassignment on May 29, 2013. Overall, Spencer made one of four field goals and 65 of 78 extra points for the Shock during the 2013 season.

Spencer was assigned to the AFL's New Orleans VooDoo on June 27, 2013. He scored one of three field goals and a perfect 36 of 36 extra points for the VooDoo in 2013.

Spencer joined the Los Angeles Kiss of the AFL for the 2014 season. On March 15, 2014, in the Kiss' first-ever game, Spencer kicked the game-winning field goal as time expired to beat the San Antonio Talons 41–38. Overall in 2014, Spencer converted seven of 12 field goals and 68 of 80 extra points while also posting ten solo tackles and four assisted tackles. The next year, he was placed on physically unable to perform on March 13, 2015. He was activated on March 17. Spencer made two of four field goals and 28 of 32 extra points during the 2015 season. He attended rookie minicamp on a tryout basis with the Detroit Lions in May 2015. The Kiss placed him on injured reserve on May 28, 2015, and later placed him on recallable reassignment on December 14, 2015.

Spencer was assigned to the Arizona Rattlers of the AFL on April 20, 2016. He was placed on injured reserve on May 9, and was later activated on July 7, 2016. He recorded 20 of 24 extra points, two solo tackles, one assisted tackles, and two pass breakups for the Rattlers in 2016.

Spencer was assigned to the expansion Albany Empire of the AFL on March 22, 2018. He was placed on refused to report on March 24, and was later activated on April 2, 2018. He made zero of one field goals and 76 of 90 extra points for the Empire in 2018 while also posting three solo tackles and eight assisted tackles.

Spencer joined the AFL's Philadelphia Soul for the 2019 season. In 2019, he converted two of four field goals and 49 of 63 extra points while recording seven solo tackles and three assisted tackles. The AFL folded after the 2019 season.

== Coaching career ==
Spencer was a special teams intern for the Michigan State Spartans of Michigan State University from 2020 to 2021. He was promoted to special teams analyst in 2022.
