= Kyle Rowley =

American football player (born 1979)

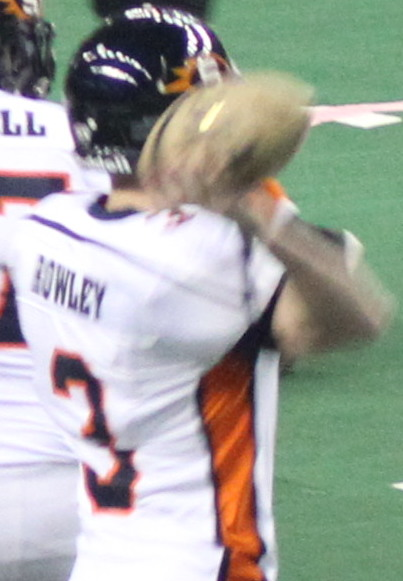
- Rowley with the Spokane Shock in 2010

No. 3, 6
- Position: Quarterback

Personal information
- Born: January 30, 1979 (age 47); Warwick, Rhode Island, U.S.
- Listed height: 6 ft 0 in (1.83 m)
- Listed weight: 195 lb (88 kg)

Career information
- High school: Bishop Hendricken (Warwick)
- College: Brown
- NFL draft: 2001: undrafted

Career history
- Charleston Swamp Foxes (2003); Columbus Wardogs (2004); Wilkes-Barre/Scranton Pioneers (2005); Manchester Wolves (2005); Bossier City Battle Wings (2005); Spokane Shock (2006); Philadelphia Soul (2007)*; Grand Rapids Rampage (2007); Arkansas Twisters (2008–2009); Spokane Shock (2010–2011); Pittsburgh Power (2012)*; Spokane Shock (2012); Orlando Predators (2013); Jacksonville Sharks (2013–2014); Orlando Predators (2014)*; Portland Thunder (2014–2015); Albany Empire (2018); Columbus Destroyers (2019)
- * Offseason or practice squad member only

Awards and highlights
- ArenaBowl champion (2010); ArenaBowl MVP (2010); ArenaCup champion (2006); ArenaCup Offensive MVP (VII); af2 Offensive Player of the Year (2008); Professional football record for single game touchdowns (12); ArenaBowl record for touchdowns (10)

Career AFL statistics
- Comp. / Att.: 1,745 / 2,811
- Passing yards: 20,274
- TD–INT: 427–100
- QB rating: 107.02
- Rushing touchdowns: 28
- Stats at ArenaFan.com

Kyle Rowley (born January 30, 1979) is an American former professional football quarterback who played in the Arena Football League (AFL) and the af2. He played college football at Brown.

Rowley was the first quarterback to win an AFL ArenaBowl and af2 ArenaCup Championship, with Nick Davila being the second. His personal career accolades include 2006 ArenaCup Player of the Game, 2008 af2 Offensive Player of the Year, and 2010 ArenaBowl XXIII Championship MVP. During his career he broke the all-time AFL Record for touchdown passes in a game (12 touchdowns vs. San Jose in 2011), broke the all-time record for touchdown passes in an AFL ArenaBowl (10 touchdowns vs Tampa Bay in 2010). Prior to his AFL career he was voted by af2 coaches and league officials in 2009 as one of the top ten signal callers in league history. He has led the AFL in passer rating and touchdowns, led the af2 in single season completion percentage and completions (2004), passer rating and touchdown/interception ratio (2006) touchdowns and touchdown passes (2008) and passing yards (2009). He also holds every Arkansas Twister and Columbus Wardog franchise passing records. He started his Arena Football career in 2003 and has played for numerous AFL and af2 teams, including the Charleston Swamp Foxes (2003), Columbus Wardogs (2004), Wilkes-Barre/Scranton Pioneers (2005), Manchester Wolves (2006, Philadelphia Soul (2007), Grand Rapids Rampage (2007), Arkansas Twisters (2008 & 2009), the Spokane Shock (2006 & 2010–2012) and the Orlando Predators.

== College career ==
Rowley attended Brown University from 1997 to 2001 and was a standout in the Ivy League, leading the league in every statistical passing category in his first and only season as the starter. In his first home start he broke the school's single game passing record with a 474 yards performance and broke the school's single game total offense record with 485 yards. He was part of one of only two Ivy League Championships in school history at the time (1999 Ivy League Champions) and recorded more varsity football wins while at Brown than any other player in school history till that time.

== Professional career ==
=== Spokane Shock ===
In 2006, while the Spokane Shock were an expansion team in the af2, he was brought in mid-season and went undefeated as a starter (9–0). He helped lead the team to a 17–2 overall record on the season, and an ArenaCup National Championship victory. He was named the ArenaCup Offensive Player of the Game and led the league that season in touchdown/interception ratio (22/1) and passer rating (127).

=== Philadelphia Soul ===
After his ArenaCup championship, Rowley was picked up by the Philadelphia Soul in 2007 to begin his AFL career.

=== Grand Rapids Rampage ===
Later during the 2007 season he was traded to the Grand Rapids Rampage where he suffered a knee injury (ACL) in the final game of the season.

=== Arkansas Twisters ===
He spent the next two seasons playing for the af2's Arkansas Twisters. In the 2008 season, his first season back from ACL surgery, he threw a league leading 98 Touchdowns and 125 passer rating before being selected as the Schutt Offensive Player of the Year by a vote of head coaches and press.

=== Spokane Shock ===
With the return of the AFL in 2010 from bankruptcy in 2009, Rowley was picked up by the newest AFL franchise, the Spokane Shock, brought over from the disbanded af2, and proceeded to win yet another expansion year national championship for the franchise. Over the course of the 2010 season, Rowley tallied a league best 130 touchdowns, 5,159 passing yards, 444 completions, 123 passing touchdowns en route to leading the Shock to an ArenaBowl XXIII win and being named the ArenaBowl XXIII MVP. In the league's final game Rowley set the record for Arena Bowl touchdown passes (9) and Arena Bowl total touchdowns (10) eclipsing the previous mark by two.

Prior to 2010 Rowley had played limited time for the AFL's Philadelphia Soul, and the Grand Rapids Rampage in second half of the 2007 season. After a knee injury in the final game of 2007, a return to the af2 in 2008, and an AFL league collapse in 2009, he returned to a revamped AFL in 2010 with the Spokane Shock. He signed with the Pittsburgh Power for the 2012 season but never actually played for them. He was released due to the AFL player strike.

Rowley returned to the Spokane Shock for the fourth game of its season. Spokane's fortunes changed in the next game when Rowley, playing in his first home game for Spokane in 2012, helped the Shock defeat the Milwaukee Mustangs 57-26. Rowley completed 20 of 26 for 214 yards and five touchdowns. And despite only playing in 15 of 18 games for the Shock in 2012, Rowley tallied 101 total touchdowns and in a crucial game verses San Jose, broke the all-time AFL record for passing touchdowns in a single game (12 touchdowns, which was tied later in the season by Tommy Grady). Before that no one in the 25-year history of the league had ever thrown 12 touchdowns in a single game.

=== Orlando Predators ===
Rowley signed with the Orlando Predators for the 2013 season. Rowley appeared in five games for the Predators, ultimately being reassigned once the Predators made a trade for Aaron Garcia.

=== Jacksonville Sharks ===
Rowley was picked up two weeks later by the Jacksonville Sharks.

=== Return to Orlando ===
On April 9, 2014, Rowley was traded with Tracy Belton to the Predators to complete a trade for Aaron Garcia.

=== Portland Thunder ===
On April 14, 2014, Rowley was traded to the winless Portland Thunder for wide receiver Jeffrey Solomon. The traded reunited Rowley with Thunder head coach, Matthew Sauk, who was the Shock offensive coordinator when Rowley lead the Shock to an ArenaBowl title. Rowley proceeded to lead the winless Thunder to a 2014 playoff berth and a near upset of the defending champion Arizona Rattlers. Sauk was fired after the 2014 season. When the Thunder hired Mike Hohensee for 2015, Rowley once again lead the Thunder to an unlikely playoff berth out of the Western Conference.

=== Albany Empire ===
On July 19, 2018, Rowley was assigned to the Albany Empire.

=== Columbus Destroyers ===
After Columbus Destroyers starting quarterback Grant Russell suffered an injury in Week 12, the team signed Rowley on July 17, 2019, to start the regular season finale against the Washington Valor. In his first AFL game since the 2015 playoffs, Rowley threw for 253 yards and five touchdowns on July 20 in the 56–50 loss to the Valor, earning Week 13 AFL Offensive Player of the Week honors.

=== AFL statistics ===
Legend
	ArenaBowl MVP
	Won the ArenaBowl
**Bold**	Career high

Year	Team	Passing							Rushing		
Year	Team	Cmp	Att	Pct	Yds	TD	Int	Rtg	Att	Yds	TD
2010	Spokane	371	566	**65.5**	**4,475**	**102**	11	**121.14**	**35**	**79**	6
2011	Spokane	294	454	64.8	3,322	78	15	112.35	22	36	**7**
2012	Spokane	**384**	**588**	65.3	4,348	96	**23**	110.60	26	26	5
2013	Orlando	93	180	51.7	1,153	18	11	71.37	5	1	0
2013	Jacksonville	94	148	63.5	974	17	8	88.63	13	36	4
2014	Jacksonville	4	11	36.4	38	1	0	69.51	0	0	0
2014	Portland	168	285	58.9	2,060	39	9	102.38	23	23	1
2015	Portland	322	546	59.0	3,651	71	21	95.57	16	14	5
2019	Columbus	15	33	45.5	253	5	2	84.53	0	0	0
Career		1,745	2,811	62.1	20,274	427	100	107.02	140	215	28
