= Markee White =

American football player (born 1983)

No. 8, 88
- Position: Wide receiver

Personal information
- Born: October 4, 1983 (age 43); Long Beach, California, U.S.
- Listed height: 6 ft 7 in (2.01 m)
- Listed weight: 215 lb (98 kg)

Career information
- High school: Polytechnic (Long Beach)
- College: Texas State
- NFL draft: 2007: undrafted

Career history
- St. Louis Rams (2007)*; Spokane Shock (2010–2011); Hartford Colonials (2010); Calgary Stampeders (2012); Arizona Rattlers (2012); Jacksonville Sharks (2013); Los Angeles Kiss (2014); Philadelphia Soul (2014); Arizona Rattlers (2015)
- * Offseason or practice squad member only

Awards and highlights
- 2× ArenaBowl champion (2010, 2012); ArenaBowl Offensive player of the game (2010)

Career AFL statistics
- Receptions: 371
- Receiving yards: 4,284
- Receiving touchdowns: 83
- Stats at ArenaFan.com

Markee White (born October 4, 1983) is an American former professional football wide receiver. He was signed by the St. Louis Rams as an undrafted free agent in 2007. He played college football at Texas State.

White was also a member of the Spokane Shock, Hartford Colonials, Calgary Stampeders, Arizona Rattlers, Jacksonville Sharks, Los Angeles Kiss, and Philadelphia Soul.

== Early life ==
White was a multi-sport athlete in high school and college. White attended Long Beach Polytechnic High School and Texas State University.

== Professional career ==
=== St. Louis Rams ===
White debuted for the St. Louis Rams, however was released in the offseason.

=== Spokane Shock ===
White joined the Spokane Shock on October 15, 2010. He would go on to have a storybook season with 66 receptions for 925 yards with 18 touchdowns. He helped the Shock reach ArenaBowl XXIII where they defeated the Tampa Bay Storm. White earned the Offensive player of the game for the ArenaBowl in 2010.

=== Hartford Colonials ===
On August 24, 2010, White signed a contract with the Hartford Colonials of the UFL.

=== Calgary Stampeders ===
White signed was signed by the Calgary Stampeders on March 12, 2012.

=== Arizona Rattlers ===
White signed with the Rattlers on April 25, 2012. He helped the Rattlers reach ArenaBowl XXV where the Rattlers defeated the Philadelphia Soul. White earned his second career ArenaBowl Championship with Arizona, after winning his first with the Spokane Shock two seasons earlier in ArenaBowl XXIII.

=== Jacksonville Sharks ===
White was traded to the Jacksonville Sharks on March 16, 2013.

=== Los Angeles Kiss ===
White was traded to the Los Angeles Kiss on December 17, 2013 for waiver positioning.

=== Philadelphia Soul ===
White was traded to the Philadelphia Soul on May 14, 2014 for waiver positioning.

=== Return to Arizona ===
On March 18, 2015, White returned to the Rattlers.
