= Brady Nelson =

American businessman (born 1978)

- Born: January 2, 1978; Spokane, Washington
- Education: B.S. (2002) in business management
- Alma mater: Brigham Young University
- Occupation(s): Owner, king marketing llc

Brady Nelson is an American businessman who is the former majority owner of the professional Arena Football League team Spokane Shock. He received his B.S. in Business Management in 2002 from the Brigham Young University Marriott School of Management. While a student there, Nelson created Regal Satellite and Security. In April 2005, shortly after graduating from BYU, Nelson with friends Adam Nebeker and Eric Enloe created the Spokane Shock with Nelson as majority owner.
