= James Ruffin (American football) =

American football player (born 1987)

No. 60, 67, 44, 77
- Position: Defensive end

Personal information
- Born: February 6, 1987 (age 39); Newark, New Jersey
- Listed height: 6 ft 4 in (1.93 m)
- Listed weight: 265 lb (120 kg)

Career information
- High school: Burnsville (Burnsville, Minnesota)
- College: Northern Iowa
- NFL draft: 2010: undrafted

Career history
- Tampa Bay Buccaneers (2010)*; Cincinnati Bengals (2011)*; Spokane Shock (2012–2014); Tampa Bay Buccaneers (2014)*; Spokane Shock (2015)
- * Offseason or practice squad member only

Awards and highlights
- 2× First-team All-Arena (2014, 2015); AFL Defensive Lineman of the Year (2014)

Career AFL statistics
- Tackles: 106
- Sacks: 38.5
- Forced Fumbles: 15
- Fumble Recoveries: 9
- Interceptions: 1
- Stats at ArenaFan.com
- Stats at Pro Football Reference

James Ruffin (born February 6, 1987) is an American former football defensive end. He played college football at University of Northern Iowa.

== Professional career ==
=== Tampa Bay Buccaneers ===
Ruffin was signed by the Tampa Bay Buccaneers as an undrafted free agent in 2010. He was released by the Buccaneers on September 4, 2010.

=== Cincinnati Bengals ===
Ruffin signed with the Cincinnati Bengals on October 17, 2010. He was released by the Bengals on September 3, 2011.

=== Spokane Shock ===
Ruffin played with the Spokane Shock from 2012 to 2014. In 2014, Ruffin set the Spokane Shock record for sacks in a season, and is the Shock's career sack leader. Ruffin's play in 2014 earned him the AFL's Defensive Lineman of the Year Award. On November 24, 2014, Ruffin was again assigned to the Shock.

=== Tampa Bay Buccaneers ===
Ruffin was signed by the Tampa Bay Buccaneers on August 5, 2014. Ruffin was waived by the Buccaneers on August 21, 2014.

=== Spokane Shock (second stint) ===
On November 24, 2014, Ruffin was again assigned to the Shock.

== Personal life ==
Married November 4, 2017 to Amber Cardinal
