= ArenaBowl XXIII =

Tampa Bay Storm (American)	Spokane Shock (National)
57	69
	1	2	3	4	Total
TB	7	21	7	22	57
SPO	6	28	14	21	69
- Date: August 20, 2010
- Stadium: Spokane Veterans Memorial Arena; Spokane, Washington
- MVP: Kyle Rowley, QB, Spokane: Markee White, WR, Spokane (Offensive Player of the Game); Jeremy Geathers, DL, Spokane (Defensive Player of the Game); Huey Whittaker, WR, Spokane (Ironman of the Game)
- Attendance: 11,017
- Winning coach: Rob Keefe
- Losing coach: Tim Marcum

TV in the United States
- Network: NFL Network
- Announcers: Paul Burmeister, Kurt Warner, Anthony Herron, and Ari Wolfe

NAPA Auto Parts ArenaBowl XXIII was an arena football game between the National Conference champion, Spokane Shock and the American Conference champion, Tampa Bay Storm. The Spokane Shock won the game successfully defending ArenaCup X of the former af2. The game was played on August 20, 2010, and was held at the Spokane Veterans Memorial Arena in Spokane, Washington, the first non-neutral site since 2004 (ArenaBowl XVIII). The game was shown live on the NFL Network, as well as a tape delay on Eurosport 2. The corporate sponsor was NAPA Auto Parts.

== Background ==
=== Tampa Bay Storm ===
See: 2010 Tampa Bay Storm season

Looking for their sixth championship in franchise history, and first since ArenaBowl XVII in 2003, the Tampa Bay Storm succeeded in their first season back since 2008. Led by quarterback Brett Dietz, who threw for 5,054 yards and 106 touchdowns in the regular season (both franchise records), they finished 11–5, 2nd in the South division, and 3rd in the American Conference.

Week	Date	Opponent	Home/Away	Result
1	April 3	Tulsa Talons	Away	L 48–54
2		Bye		
3	April 16	Dallas Vigilantes	Home	W 54–41
4	April 25	Milwaukee Iron	Away	L 61–72
5	May 1	Arizona Rattlers	Home	W 62–61
6	May 7	Jacksonville Sharks	Home	L 43–46
7	May 15	Bossier–Shreveport Battle Wings	Away	W 48–44
8	May 22	Bye		
9	May 28	Orlando Predators	Away	W 62–50
10	June 5	Oklahoma City Yard Dawgz	Home	W 50–48
11	June 12	Alabama Vipers	Away	W 61–55
12	June 19	Utah Blaze	Away	W 65–40
13	June 25	Bossier–Shreveport Battle Wings	Home	W 78–39
14	July 2	Chicago Rush	Home	W 68–60
15	July 9	Dallas Vigilantes	Away	W 56–34
16	July 16	Jacksonville Sharks	Away	L 47–49
17	July 24	Alabama Vipers	Home	W 53–49
18	July 30	Orlando Predators	Home	L 60–75
–	August 7	Tulsa Talons	Road	W 68–38
–	August 14	Orlando Predators	Home	W 63–62

=== Spokane Shock ===
See: 2010 Spokane Shock season

The Spokane Shock, fresh off their ArenaCup X victory in what would be the last arenafootball2 season, earned their spot in the postseason by going 13–3 in the regular season, the AFL's best record in 2010, which gave them home field advantage throughout the entire playoffs. It's the Shock's first ArenaBowl in franchise history, having three previous ArenaCup appearances in af2.

Week	Date	Opponent	Home/Away	Result
1	April 2	Milwaukee Iron	Home	L 62–74
2	April 9	Utah Blaze	Away	W 68–34
3	April 17	Bossier–Shreveport Battle Wings	Home	W 78–70
4		Bye		
5	May 1	Cleveland Gladiators	Home	L 68–72
6	May 7	Arizona Rattlers	Away	W 63–56
7	May 16	Oklahoma City Yard Dawgz	Away	W 68–63
8	May 22	Utah Blaze	Home	W 77–28
9	May 29	Jacksonville Sharks	Home	W 67–57
10		Bye		
11	June 12	Orlando Predators	Away	W 53–52
12	June 18	Tulsa Talons	Home	W 63–42
13	June 26	Milwaukee Iron	Away	W 62–48
14	July 2	Arizona Rattlers	Home	W 37–36
15	July 10	Cleveland Gladiators	Away	W 62–56 (OT)
16	July 16	Iowa Barnstormers	Away	W 62–61
17	July 23	Chicago Rush	Home	W 63–49
18	July 30	Jacksonville Sharks	Away	L 49–64
–	August 6	Arizona Rattlers	Home	W 57–49
–	August 12	Milwaukee Iron	Home	W 60–57

== Broadcasting ==
ArenaBowl XXIII was televised on the NFL Network and Eurosport 2. It was available in 48 countries worldwide. Radio broadcasts were available in the local markets of Tampa Bay and Spokane only.

=== NFL Network ===
NFL Network delivered live coverage outside of the United States to these countries:
Canada
Mexico
United Kingdom

=== Eurosport 2 ===
The AFL had a taped delayed broadcast available in the following countries:
France
Ireland
Italy
Germany
Greece
Hungary
Russia
Bulgaria
Poland
Portugal
Romania
Serbia
Turkey
Denmark
Ukraine
Croatia

=== Radio ===
These were the radio broadcasting groups present:
Washington State:Spokane- 700am ESPN Radio 700 ESPN The Ticket
Florida :Tampa Bay- 1250am Impact Radio WHNZ Tampa Bay

=== Playoffs ===
This was the 2010 playoff grid to determine ArenaBowl Champion:

Conference Semifinals
1	Jacksonville	69
4	Orlando	73
American Conference
2	San Antonio	38
3	Tampa Bay	68
1	Spokane	57
4	Arizona	49
National Conference
2	Milwaukee	64
3	Chicago	54

Conference Championship
4	Orlando	62
3	Tampa Bay	63
1	Spokane	60
2	Milwaukee	57

ArenaBowl XXIII
A3	Tampa Bay	57
N1	Spokane	69

In the opening round of the playoffs, Spokane defeated the Arizona Rattlers 57–49, while the Storm took care of the Tulsa Talons 68–38. In the National Conference Championship game, Spokane edged out the Milwaukee Iron 60–57. In another close contest, the Storm knocked off rival Orlando 63–62 in the first playoff meeting of The War on I-4 since 2003, winning the American Conference Championship and punching their ticket to ArenaBowl XXIII.

== Game summary ==
=== First half ===
The Tampa Bay Storm received the opening kickoff, driving 45 yards in 11 plays to take a 7–0 lead on a three-yard run by Eric Ortiz. But this would be the only time in the game the Storm would lead by more than one point.

Spokane scored the next three touchdowns to take a 20–7 lead. Huey Whittaker caught the first one from Kyle Rowley, and Markee White grabbed the next two, both from four yards out.

Tampa Bay finally answered with 5:49 left in the first half, another rushing score by Ortiz to make the score 20–14.

After Markee White's third receiving touchdown gave the Shock a 27–14 lead, Tampa Bay scored consecutive touchdowns to take a 28–27 lead. But Spokane got the last points of the half. White's fourth touchdown from Rowley made it 34–28. Tampa had a chance to add three points as the first half expired, but Garrett Rivas's field goal was blocked.

=== Second half ===
The Storm took its final lead of the game 35–34 to open the third quarter on Ortiz's third rushing touchdown. But Spokane would score the next three touchdowns. The Shock led 48–35 at the end of the third quarter and expanded it to 55–35 at the beginning of the final quarter.

In the fourth quarter, the Shock just wanted to keep the clock running and force the Storm to play catch up. Both teams traded touchdowns through the entire quarter, and Tampa Bay could not make up the deficit. The Storm got the game's last score with 44 seconds left, making it 69–57, the closest it got all quarter.

=== Game notes ===
Spokane Shock quarterback Kyle Rowley was named the game's MVP. He went 24 for 32 with 237 yards. He threw nine touchdown passes without an interception and added another touchdown on the run. The nine touchdowns he threw for set an ArenaBowl record.

Spokane did not have a 100-yard receiver but Markee White caught nine passes for 99 yards and four scores. Huey Whittaker had four touchdown receptions as well to go along with eight catches for 82 yards.

The Shocks' Mervin Brookins and Travis Williams each recorded an interception.

For Tampa Bay, quarterback Brett Dietz threw for 306 yards on 29 of 40 passing. He had four touchdown passes and two interceptions. The Storm's Hank Edwards led the game with 11 catches for 132 yards. He caught two of Dietz's scoring passes. Tyrone Timmons also had eight receptions for 107 yards and a score.

=== Attendance ===
The announced attendance for ArenaBowl XXIII was 11,017. The game was a sellout, at 102% capacity given Spokane Arena's 10,771 capacity. However, it was the second lowest attended ArenaBowl in league history, second only to ArenaBowl XIX in 2005. That game between the Georgia Force and Colorado Crush was the AFL's first neutral site ArenaBowl with 10,822 fans at the Thomas & Mack Center in Las Vegas, Nevada.
