= Spokane Shock =

Arena football team

- Logo
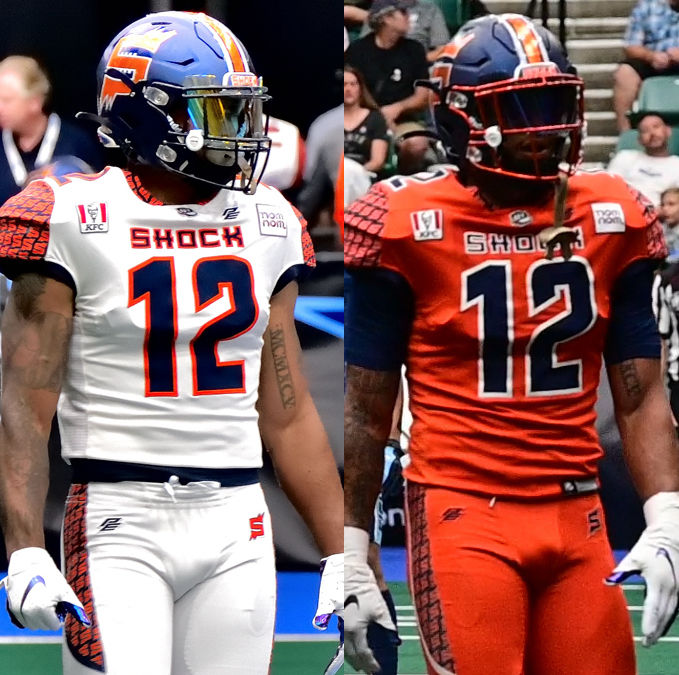
- Uniforms

General information
- Founded: 2005
- Folded: 2021
- Headquartered: Spokane Veterans Memorial Arena in Spokane, Washington
- Colors: Blue, orange, gold, white
- Mascot: Shox The Fox
- TheSpokaneShock.com

Personnel
- Owner: Sam Adams
- Head coach: Cedric Walker

Team history
- Spokane Shock (2006–2015); Spokane Empire (2016–2017); Spokane Shock (2020–2021)

Home fields
- Spokane Veterans Memorial Arena (2006–2017, 2020–2021)

League / conference affiliations
- AF2 (2006–2009); National Conference (2006–2009); Western Division (2006–2009); Arena Football League (2010–2015); National Conference (2010–2015); Western Division (2010–2013); Pacific Division (2014–2015); Indoor Football League (2016–2017; 2020–2021); Intense Conference (2016–2017)

Championships
- League championships: 3: af2: 2006, 2009; AFL: 2010
- Conference championships: 2: AFL: 2010; IFL: 2016
- Division championships: 8: Western (af2): 2006, 2007, 2008, 2009; Western (AFL): 2010

Playoff appearances (11)
- af2: 2006, 2007, 2008, 2009; AFL: 2010, 2011, 2013, 2014, 2015; IFL: 2016, 2021

The Spokane Shock were a professional indoor American football team based in Spokane, Washington, that played their home games at the Spokane Veterans Memorial Arena. The team was initially a member of arenafootball2 (af2), the Shock won division titles in all four seasons and ArenaCups in 2006 and 2009 before they joined the Arena Football League (AFL) in its 2010 relaunch. The team advanced to the playoffs three times after joining the AFL, winning ArenaBowl XXIII in their first season, making them the only arena football franchise to win both the ArenaCup and the ArenaBowl.

The AFL franchise was folded in October 2015 and the ownership group obtained a franchise in the Indoor Football League (IFL), known as the Spokane Empire, as the rights to the Shock name still belonged to the AFL. They played in the IFL as the Empire for the 2016 and 2017 seasons. On July 12, 2017, owner Nader Naini announced that the Empire would cease operations, citing financial issues. About a year after the Empire folded, Naini claims to have traded the Empire branding to the AFL for the original Shock trademarks.

In 2019, former Seattle Seahawks player Sam Adams announced he was relaunching the team for the 2020 season. Adams had obtained the trademarks of the Shock name from Naini and re-joined the Indoor Football League. The Shock were removed from the IFL after failing to reach a lease agreement in 2022.

== Franchise history ==
=== Birth ===
For many years, there were proposals to bring an arena football team to Spokane. In summer 2005, owner Brady Nelson teamed up with two additional partners to bring a team to Spokane. On August 26, 2005, during af2 league meetings in Bossier City, Louisiana, league commissioner Jerry Kurz accepted Nelson's proposal for a Spokane af2 team. The Shock was one of three expansion teams to begin playing in 2006. The other two were the Everett Hawks, and the Stockton Lightning.

=== 2006: The Cinderella Story ===
On October 12, 2005, the Shock announced that Chris Siegfried would be the franchise's inaugural coach. By the end of 2005, 13 players had been signed. On February 28, 2006, the Spokane Shock sold their 2,000th season ticket. On March 22, 2006, 3,000 season tickets had been sold. On March 30, 2006, the Spokane Shock played their inaugural game against the Stockton Lightning and won 41–40.

The Shock put together a significant inaugural season, posting a 14–2 regular-season record and a first-place finish in the National Conference Western Division. During the af2 playoffs, the Shock defeated the Bakersfield Blitz and the Arkansas Twisters en route to winning the af2 National Conference championship and a berth in ArenaCup VII against the Green Bay Blizzard in San Juan, Puerto Rico. On August 26, the Shock defeated the Blizzard by a score of 57–34 to win ArenaCup VII. The Spokane Shock became the first expansion team in af2 history to advance to, and win, the ArenaCup. The Shock led the league in attendance with an average of 10,313 fans per home game.

As a result of the team's excellent play, head coach Chris Siegfried was named the af2 Head Coach of the Year for the 2006 season. Four Shock players also earned All-af2 National Conference honors as well. WR/LB Charles Frederick, OLS Ed Ta'amu and DS Rob Keefe earned first-team honors while OL/DL Jerome Stevens earned second-team accolades.

=== Final af2 seasons: 2007–2009 ===
On September 4, 2006, Spokane head coach Chris Siegfried accepted the offensive coordinator position for the AFL's Kansas City Brigade. On September 20, 2006, the Spokane Shock announced that former Louisville Fire offensive coordinator Adam Shackleford would become their new head coach. The 2007 Shock won their second consecutive division title with a 12–4 record. The Shock then fell in the first round of the af2 playoffs to the Louisville Fire.

In 2008, the Shock fielded another talented team, opening the season with eleven straight wins before losing to the South Georgia Wildcats on a last second field goal. It was the only Shock loss during the regular season, qualifying for the playoffs and clinching home field advantage until the ArenaCup. The Shock faced the Tennessee Valley Vipers on August 25, 2008, in ArenaCup IX. Tennessee Valley was forced to play with its backup quarterback for most of the game after their starter was injured during the first drive. The game was close throughout and regulation ended with a tie to send the ArenaCup into its first ever overtime. After the Shock scored a touchdown and a successful extra point, Tennessee Valley matched them with a touchdown, but went for a two-point conversion and succeeded, to capture their first ArenaCup championship.

The Shock put together another 15–1 regular season in 2009. The Shock again advanced to the ArenaCup, defeating the Wilkes-Barre/Scranton Pioneers 74–27 in Las Vegas, Nevada.

=== Arena Football League: 2010–2015 ===
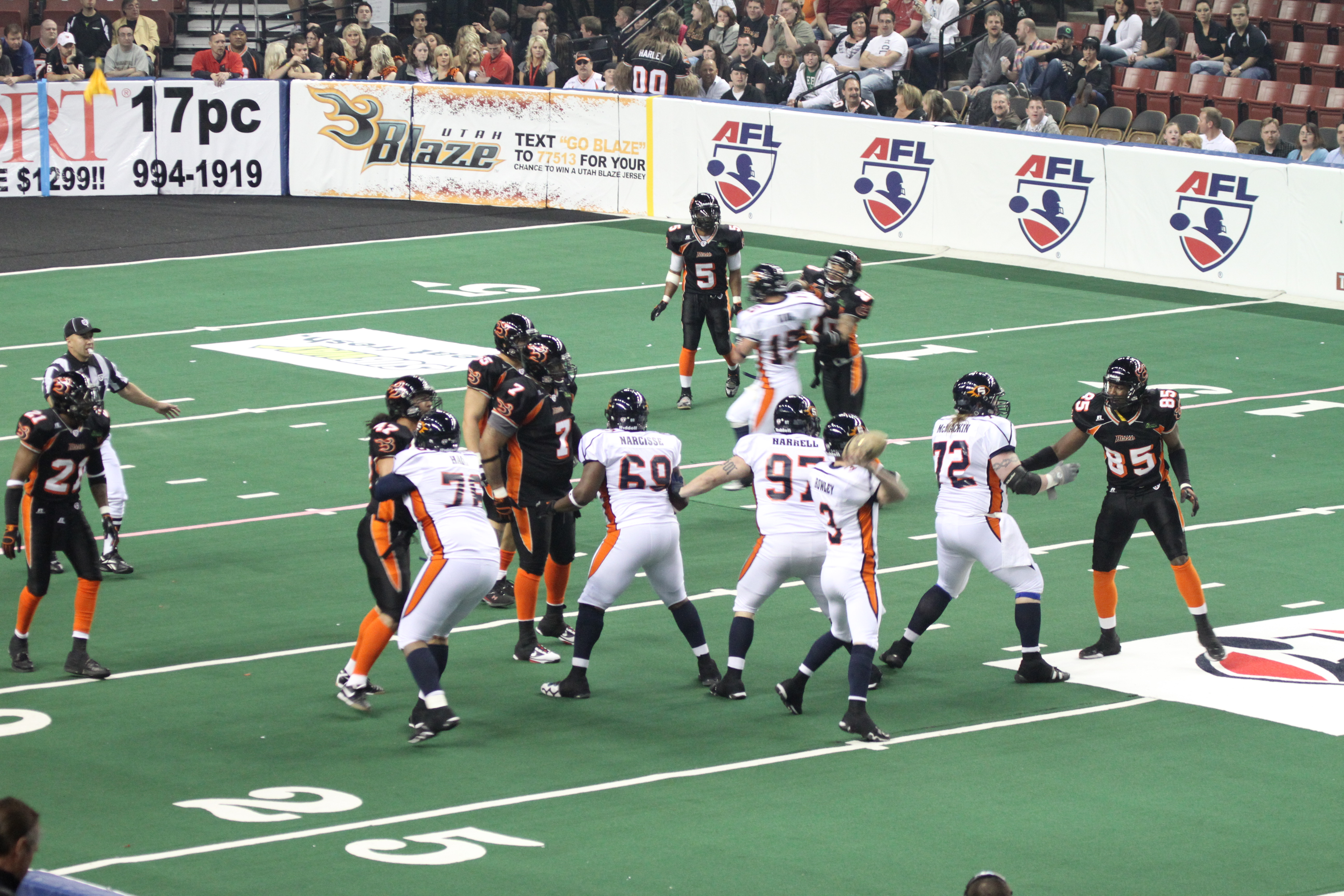
The Shock playing the Utah Blaze on April 9, 2010

On September 27, 2009, the Spokane Shock became part of the Arena Football 1, an entity founded by multiple af2 organizations along with several of the recently defunct Arena Football League (AFL) teams, that was created to replace AFL. In November 2009, Arena Football 1 purchased the assets from the AFL's bankruptcy auction and rebranded as a continuation of the Arena Football League.

The Shock promoted defensive backs' coach Rob Keefe to the head coaching position. The team continued their success in the relaunched league, finishing the regular season with a 16–3 record claiming the first seed in the playoffs. The Shock advanced to ArenaBowl XXIII against the 13–6 Tampa Bay Storm. In front of a franchise record crowd of 11,017, the Shock defeated the Storm 69–57 behind nine touchdown passes from Kyle Rowley.

On July 9, 2011, the Shock hosted an outdoor game at Spokane's Joe Albi Stadium. The Shock went 9–9 for the season, lost in the first round of the playoffs, and fired head coach Rob Keefe following the season. The Shock promoted offensive coordinator, Andy Olson to head coach for 2012 and improved to 10–8, but failed to qualify for the playoffs for the first time in the team's existence. Prior to the 2013 season, the Shock lost quarterback Kyle Rowley in free agency but quarterback Erik Meyer put together an MVP 2013 season, also winning Offensive Player of the Year. Wide receiver Adron Tennell won Receiver of the Year. The Shock went 14–4 and lost in the conference championship.

In January 2014, it was announced that Brady Nelson had sold the Shock to Arena Football Partners, LLC., an ownership group led by Nader Naini.

In 2015, after losing former MVP and Offensive Player of the Year, Erik Meyer, and former Wide Receiver of the Year Adron Tennell to division rival, San Jose. The Shock made the playoffs, but lost to the Arizona Rattlers 72–41. Following the season, Olson announced that he would not be returning to coach the Shock in 2016 and the Shock re-hired Adam Shackleford away from the Tri-Cities Fever.

=== Spokane Empire join the IFL: 2016–2017 ===
Beginning on August 10, 2015, talk began surfacing about a possible move to the Indoor Football League by Shock owner Nader Naini, who was heavily involved with bringing Scott Butera to the AFL as its new commissioner. He accused the AFL and some of its teams of cheating, favoring the more established franchises and not fulfilling obligations to improve the product, forcing him to weigh options for the team's future which includes dropping to the IFL, a move that some players expressed unhappiness and disappointment about. However, IFL commissioner Mike Allshouse was quick to point out, "At this point, it would be improper to comment about any team that is associated with another league."

The move was officially confirmed on September 1, 2015. This made 2016 the second straight year that an established AFL franchise moved to the IFL following the Iowa Barnstormers. However, the Spokane franchise had to operate under a different identity, as the Arena Football League announced on October 12 that the team and league could not reach an agreement for the team's trademark and logos, which are owned by the AFL. A press release from the AFL indicated that the league would retain the rights to the Shock name and logos. However, the team retained the Shock's history and went by a new name for the 2016 season, and a name-the-team contest had the franchise become known as the Spokane Empire.

The 2016 Spokane Empire went 12–4 in their inaugural IFL campaign. They advanced to the championship game by winning the Intense Conference championship beating the Nebraska Danger 55–44, but fell to the Sioux Falls Storm 55–34 in the final. They came close to an achievement that had not been done before; winning three different league championships in their first season in the league with the af2's ArenaCup, the AFL's ArenaBowl and the IFL's United Bowl.

The following 2017 season, the team went 8–8 and missed the playoffs for only the second time in franchise history. On July 12, 2017, owner Nader Naini announced that the Empire had ceased operations, citing financial issues. About a year after the Empire folded, Naini claims to have traded the Empire branding to the AFL, which became the Albany Empire, for the original Shock trademarks.

=== Return of Spokane Shock: 2019–2022 ===
In 2019, Naini sold the Shock trademark and remaining assets to former Seattle Seahawks' player Sam Adams with the intention of relaunching the Shock in the IFL for the 2020 season. The IFL announced the return of the Shock on November 1, 2019. Adams brought in the head coach of the Carolina Cobras as the new head coach of the Shock. However, before the Shock could play a game, the 2020 season was postponed and eventually cancelled due to the COVID-19 pandemic shutting down most venues due to social distancing measures. Adams stated the Shock would still play games in 2020 against any other team regardless of schedule once the government allowed venues to re-open, which did not come to fruition.

The Shock played their first game since relaunching on May 15, 2021, in a 36–33 loss to the Frisco Fighters to start their 2021 season. Spokane advanced to the 2021 IFL playoffs, but were eliminated on August 28 in a quarterfinal game against Frisco.

On February 15, 2022, it was reported that Adams and the Shock had not signed lease with the arena for the 2022 season set to start in March. Adams was required to pay the arena by December 31, 2021, but the wired payment did not clear the bank. He signed the lease later that day, but the arena had yet to be issued the $128,000 security bond and Adams had until February 23 or the lease would be terminated. It was extended to February 24, but Adams still did not make the payment in time and the Shock lost their lease for the 2022 season. The Shock were subsequently removed from the IFL later that evening. On February 24, 2022, Adams was ordered to pay two former employees of his Shock franchise $9,342.18 in unpaid wages as well as former assistant general manager (and former AFL Shock player) Patrick Afif in two separate Washington State Department of Labor and Industries legal cases against him. The next day, Adams stated he was applying to join the National Arena League (NAL), which is mostly based on the east coast, but the NAL quickly dismissed the idea.

On July 22, 2022, all assets of the Shock and Empire past were auctioned off in a liquidation sale where fans took home merchandise, trophies (including af2 and IFL trophies) and other assets left behind by Adams leaving town without warning. Adams has also stated that he has no plans to sell the Shock name and identity despite various lawsuits against him that are still in litigation.

== Attendance history ==
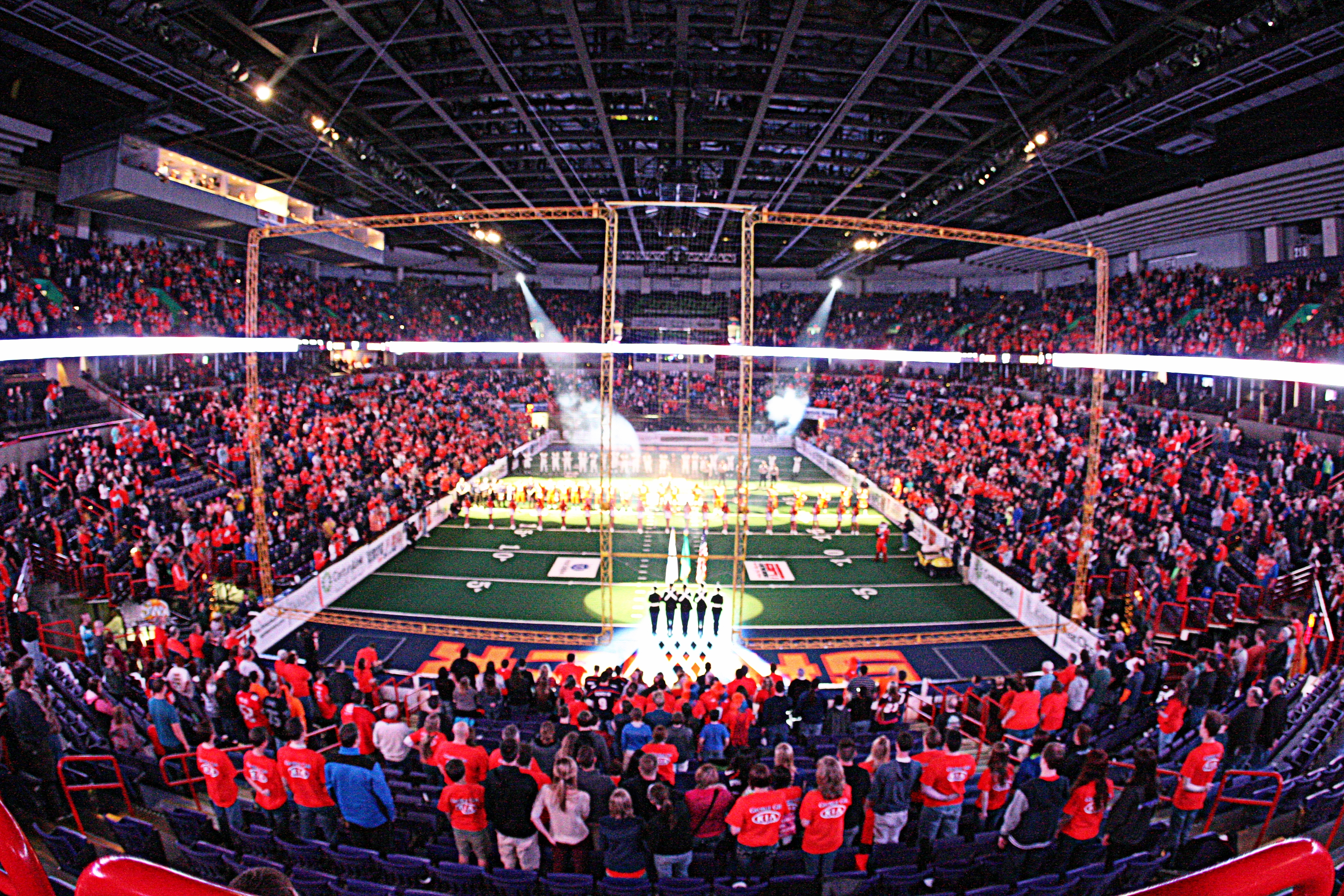
Fans at a game in 2013

=== af2 (2006–2009) ===
Spokane Shock arena football attendance records show the largest crowds: 10,662 vs. Tennessee Valley (Arena Cup 9 - August 25, 2008); 10,659 twice during 2008 regular season, and smallest crowds: 7,267 vs. Stockton 2009 playoffs (August 1, 2009); 9,387 vs. Stockton on March 30, 2006 (inaugural game).

==== Regular season average attendance ====
Year	Total Att	Average	League rank	Sellouts / Games
2006 (af2)	79,213	9,902	1st	4 of 8
2007 (af2)	84,556	10,570	1st	8 of 8
2008 (af2)	84,705	10,588	1st	8 of 8
2009 (af2)	83,306	10,413	1st	5 of 8
Total	331,780	10,368	—	25 of 32

Total all-time attendance, including playoff games while part of the af2 (2006–2009): 422,584
Total all-time sellouts including playoff games: 27

==== Regular season sellout streak ====
The Spokane Shock sold out the Spokane Arena for 19 consecutive regular season games starting with the regular season finale in 2006, and continuing to the second game in 2009. The last non-sellout regular season game was on June 26, 2009.

==== Playoff attendance history (af2) ====
- 2006: (20,242) 1st round bye, 2nd round 9,692 vs Bakersfield, 3rd round 10,550 vs Arkansas, Arena Cup VII in Puerto Rico
- 2007: (8,272) 1st round 8,272 vs. Louisville
- 2008: (37,735) 1st round 8,872 vs. Austin, 2nd round 8,923 vs. Central Valley, 3rd round 9,278 vs. Amarillo, Arena Cup VIII at Spokane Arena 10,662 vs. Tennessee Valley.
- 2009: (24,555) 1st round 7,267 vs. Stockton, 2nd round 8,041 vs. Boise, 3rd round 9,247 vs. Tulsa, Arena Cup X in Las Vegas

==== Other af2 attendance records ====
- 2nd, 3rd, 4th & 5th highest total regular season attendance in af2 history: 83,306 (2009), 84,705 (2008), 84,556 (2007), 79,213 (2006).
- Largest crowd in Arena Cup History (10,662 – Arena Cup IX) Spokane vs. Tennessee Valley on August 25, 2008.
- Longest regular season sell-out streak in af2 history, 19 games.
- af2 season ticket sales record – 2007, almost 8,000.

=== AFL (2010–2015) ===
==== Regular season Spokane Shock AFL attendance ====
- Largest crowd (outdoor): 16,233 vs. Utah Blaze (July 9, 2011, Joe Albi Outdoor Classic)
- Largest crowd (indoor): 10,775 vs. Chicago Rush (July 23, 2010)
- Smallest crowd: 7,497 vs. Las Vegas Outlaws (June 13, 2015)

==== Postseason Spokane Shock AFL attendance ====
- Largest crowd: 11,017 vs. Tampa Bay Storm ArenaBowl XXIII (August 20, 2010)
- Smallest crowd: 6,916 vs. Chicago Rush 1st Round (August 1, 2013)

==== Regular season average attendance ====
Year	Total Att	Average	League Rank	Sellouts / Games
2010	82,509	10,313	5th	1 of 8
2011	92,497	10,277	3rd	0 of 9 (Note: Includes one outdoor game)
2012	81,206	9,023	6th	0 of 9
2013	83,669	9,296	3rd	1 of 9
2014	80,814	8,979	6th	1 of 9
2015	72,314	8,034	8th	0 of 9
Total	493,009	9,302	—	3 of 53

==== Playoff attendance history ====
- 2010: (8,236) 1st round 8,236 vs. Arizona Rattlers August 6, 2010
- 2010: (8,151) Conference Championship 8,151 vs. Milwaukee Iron August 12, 2010
- 2010: (11,017) ArenaBowl XXIII 11,017 vs. Tampa Bay Storm August 20, 2010
- 2013: (6,916) 1st round 6,916 vs. Chicago Rush August 1, 2013

=== Outdoor Summer Classic Game at Joe Albi Stadium ===
The Spokane Shock played the first outdoor arena football game on July 9, 2011, at Joe Albi Stadium in Spokane. A Spokane Shock record crowd of 16,233 watched the Shock beat the Utah Blaze 76–49. Joe Albi Stadium holds between 20,000 and 24,000 for football. The shaded side of the stadium was filled to capacity, while the sunny side was about half full. Daytime temperatures reached over 90 °F (50 °C) that day, and game time was pushed back to 6:00 pm PDT as a result.

== Players ==
=== Arena Football League ===
==== Individual awards ====
AFL MVP
Season	Player	Position
2013	Erik Meyer	QB

AFL Offensive Player of the Year
Season	Player	Position
2013	Erik Meyer	QB

AFL Playmaker of the Year
Season	Player	Position
2014	Terrance Sanders	DB/KR

AFL Kicker of the Year
Season	Player	Position
2012	Kenny Spencer	K

AFL Wide Receiver of the Year
Season	Player	Position
2013	Adron Tennell	WR

AFL Defensive Lineman of the Year
Season	Player	Position
2014	James Ruffin	DE

==== All-Arena players ====
The following Shock players were named to All-Arena Teams:

- QB Erik Meyer
- WR Huey Whittaker, Adron Tennell
- OL Ed Ta'amu, Patrick Afif
- DL James Ruffin (2)
- DB Terrance Sanders
- K Kenny Spencer
- KR Terrance Sanders (3)

==== All-Ironman players ====
The following Shock players were named to All-Ironman Teams:

- WR/KR Terrance Sanders

=== Indoor Football League ===
==== Individual awards ====
IFL Offensive Rookie of the Year
Season	Player	Position
2016	Trevor Kennedy	RB

==== All-League selections ====
- QB Charles Dowdell
- RB Trevor Kennedy
- OL Dave Lefotu
- DL Benjamin Perry, J. D. Griggs
- LB Nick Haag
- DB Rob Brown, John Hardy-Tuliau

== Coaches ==
Name	Term	Regular season				Playoffs		Awards
Name	Term	W	L	T	Win%	W	L	Awards
Spokane Shock
Chris Siegfried	2006	14	2	0	.875	3	0	af2 Coach of the Year
Adam Shackleford	2007–2009	42	6	0	.875	7	2	
Rob Keefe	2010–2011	22	12	0	.647	3	1	
Andy Olson	2012–2015	42	30	0	.583	1	3	
Spokane Empire
Adam Shackleford	2016–2017	20	12	0	.625	1	1	
Spokane Shock
Billy Back	2020–2021	6	7	0	.500	0	1	
Cedric Walker	2022	0	0	0	–	0	0	

== Season-by-season ==
League champions	Conference champions	Division champions	Playoff berth

Season	League	Conference	Division	Regular season			Postseason results
Season	League	Conference	Division	Finish	Wins	Losses	Postseason results
Spokane Shock
2006	AF2	National	West	1st	14	2	Won Conference Semifinal (Bakersfield) 50–47; Won Conference Championship (Arkansas) 48–30; Won ArenaCup VII (Green Bay) 57–34
2007	AF2	American	West	1st	12	4	Lost First Round (Louisville) 35–62
2008	AF2	National	West	1st	15	1	Won First Round (Austin) 42–14; Won Conference Semifinals (Central Valley) 83–63; Won Conference Championship (Amarillo) 79–49; Lost ArenaCup IX (Tennessee Valley) 55–56
2009	AF2	National	West	1st	15	1	Won First Round (Stockton) 62–21; Won Conference Semifinals (Boise) 59–35; Won Conference Championship (Tulsa) 51–44; Won ArenaCup X (Wilkes-Barre/Scranton) 74–27
2010	AFL	National	West	1st	13	3	Won Conference Semifinals (Arizona) 57–49; Won Conference Championship (Milwaukee) 60–57; Won ArenaBowl XXIII (Tampa Bay) 69–57
2011	AFL	National	West	2nd	9	9	Lost Conference Semifinals (Arizona) 33–62
2012	AFL	National	West	4th	10	8	
2013	AFL	National	West	2nd	14	4	Won Conference Semifinals (Chicago) 69–47; Lost Conference Championship (Arizona) 57–65
2014	AFL	National	Pacific	2nd	11	7	Lost Conference Semifinals (San Jose) 28–55
2015	AFL	National	Pacific	2nd	7	11	Lost Conference Semifinals (Arizona) 41–72
Spokane Empire
2016	IFL	Intense		1st	12	4	Won Intense Conference Championship (Nebraska) 55–44; Lost 2016 United Bowl (Sioux Falls) 34–55
2017	IFL	Intense		3rd	8	8	
Spokane Shock
2020	IFL			Season cancelled due to COVID-19 pandemic			
2021	IFL			6th	6	6	Lost First round (Frisco) 33–44
Total					146	68	(Regular season)
Total					15	8	(Postseason)
Total					161	76	
