= 2007 Arizona Rattlers season =

Indoor football season

- Head coach: Gene Nudo
- Home stadium: US Airways Center

Results
- Record: 4–12
- Division place: 4th
- Playoffs: Did not qualify

The 2007 Arizona Rattlers season was the 16th season for the franchise. They looked to make the playoffs after finishing 2006 with an 8–8 record. They finished 4–12 record and missed the playoffs.

== Coaching ==
Gene Nudo entered his second season as the head coach of the Rattlers.

== Season schedule ==
Week	Date	Opponent	Home/Away Game	Result
1	March 3	Georgia Force	Home	L 69–65
2	March 10	Utah Blaze	Home	L 79–75
3	March 16	Colorado Crush	Away	L 56–54
4	March 23	Las Vegas Gladiators	Home	W 68–41
5	March 30	Kansas City Brigade	Away	L 62–61 (OT)
6	April 6	Los Angeles Avengers	Away	L 64–45
7	April 14	Nashville Kats	Home	L 62–36
8	April 20	Utah Blaze	Away	W 83–69
9	April 28	New York Dragons	Away	L 67–45
10	May 5	San Jose SaberCats	Home	L 56–49
11	May 12	Austin Wranglers	Home	W 53–41
12	May 18	Tampa Bay Storm	Away	L 59–50
13	May 26	Chicago Rush	Home	L 53–47
14	June 3	Las Vegas Gladiators	Away	W 41–20
15	June 11	Los Angeles Avengers	Home	L 55–52
16	June 16	San Jose SaberCats	Away	L 66–26
17		Bye	Week	

== Stats ==
=== Offense ===
==== Quarterback ====
Player	Comp.	Att.	Comp%	Yards	TD's	INT's	Long	Rating
Sherdrick Bonner	316	498	63.5	4036	83	13	45	117.4
Chris Sanders	28	51	54.9	381	7	3	44	88.8

==== Running backs ====
Player	Car.	Yards	Avg.	TD's	Long
Bo Kelly	81	222	2.7	13	16
Trandon Harvey	5	34	6.8	3	30
Asi Faoa	9	19	2.1	0	8
Jeremiah Pope	5	17	3.4	2	6
Chris Sanders	9	14	1.6	3	4
Erik Arevalo	3	9	3	0	4
Sherdrick Bonner	13	9	0.7	1	4
Curtis Fagan	1	2	2	1	2
Kevin McKenzie	1	1	1	1	1
Darrell Jones	1	−1	−1	0	−1
Cosmo DeMatteo	1	−4	−4	0	−4

==== Wide receivers ====
Player	Rec.	Yards	Avg.	TD's	Long
Trandon Harvey	91	1314	14.4	28	45
Jeremiah Pope	70	903	12.9	23	41
Atnaf Harris	35	500	14.3	8	41
Kevin McKenzie	36	464	12.9	12	45
Randy Gatewood	35	416	11.9	10	34
Willis Page III	63	1324	21.3	28	58
Curtis Fagan	26	290	11.2	2	30
Darrell Jones	23	231	10	1	29
Cosmo DeMatteo	13	171	13.2	3	35
Bo Kelly	4	50	12.5	0	21
Asi Faoa	3	30	10	0	14
Wendall Gaines	1	16	16	1	16
Craig Moore	3	16	5.3	0	6
Justin Taplin	2	13	6.5	0	7
William Fields	1	8	8	0	8
Zach Rupp	2	5	2.5	0	6
Albrey Battle	1	4	4	1	4
Vince Amey	1	2	2	1	2

==== Touchdowns ====
Player	TD's	Rush	Rec	Ret	Pts
Trandon Harvey	32	3	28	1	192
Jeremiah Pope	25	2	23	0	152
Bo Kelly	13	13	0	0	78
Kevin McKenzie	13	1	12	0	78
Randy Gatewood	10	0	10	0	62
Atnaf DeShawn Harris	8	0	8	0	48
Cosmo DeMatteo	3	0	3	0	18
Curtis Fagan	3	1	2	0	18
Darrell Jones	3	0	1	2	18
Chris Sanders	3	3	0	0	18
Vince Amey	1	0	1	0	6
Albrey Battle	1	0	1	0	6
Sherdrick Bonner	1	1	0	0	6
Wendall Gaines	1	0	1	0	6

=== Defense ===
Player	Tackles	Solo	Assisted	Sack	Solo	Assisted	INT	Yards	TD's	Long
Keyuo Craver	107	92	30	0	0	0	3	37	0	21
Willis Page III	53	49	4	0	0	0	11	197	6	47
Joseph Todd	41	36	10	0	0	0	2	0	0	0
William Fields	37.5	31	13	0	0	0	2	10	0	10
Grant Steen	33.5	21	25	0	0	0	3	11	0	11
Art Smith	26.5	22	9	0	0	0	1	24	0	24
Wendall Gaines	22.5	15	15	5.5	4	3	0	0	0	0
Jeff Ruffin	20	10	20	4	3	2	0	0	0	0
Asi Faoa	17.5	12	11	0	0	0	0	0	0	0
Zach Rupp	17	11	12	.5	0	1	0	0	0	0
Vince Amey	15.5	9	13	2	1	2	0	0	0	0
Josh Golden	15.5	14	3	0	0	0	0	0	0	0
Frank Trentadue	10.5	6	9	0	0	0	0	0	0	0
Trandon Harvey	9.5	6	7	0	0	0	0	0	0	0
Chad Pegues	9.5	8	3	0	0	0	0	0	0	0
Kevin McKenzie	8	7	2	0	0	0	0	0	0	0
Bo Kelly	6.5	5	3	0	0	0	0	0	0	0
Jeremiah Pope	6	5	2	0	0	0	0	0	0	0
Justin Taplin	5	4	2	0	0	0	1	0	0	0
Curtis Fagan	4	3	2	0	0	0	0	0	0	0
Clay Rush	4	4	0	0	0	0	0	0	0	0
Darrell Jones	3.5	3	1	0	0	0	0	0	0	0
Tony Lukins	3	3	0	0	0	0	1	16	0	16
Chris Sanders	3	3	0	0	0	0	0	0	0	0
Jerry Sharp	3	2	2	0	0	0	0	0	0	0
Randy Gatewood	2	2	0	0	0	0	0	0	0	0
Steve Mascorro	2	2	0	0	0	0	0	0	0	0
Craig Moore	2	2	0	0	0	0	0	0	0	0
Erik Arevalo	1	1	0	0	0	0	0	0	0	0
Pete Christofilakos	1	1	0	0	0	0	0	0	0	0
Cosmo DeMatteo	1	1	0	0	0	0	0	0	0	0
Albrey Battle	.5	0	1	0	0	0	0	0	0	0

=== Special teams ===
==== Kick return ====
Player	Ret	Yards	TD's	Long	Avg	Ret	Yards	TD's	Long	Avg
Darrell Jones	48	929	1	56	19.4	1	55	1	55	55
Kevin McKenzie	20	340	0	35	17	1	28	0	28	28
Trandon Harvey	14	192	1	22	13.7	1	7	0	7	7
Keyuo Craver	2	26	1	19	13	0	0	0	0	0
Jeremiah Pope	1	18	0	18	18	0	0	0	0	0
Asi Faoa	0	0	0	0	0	1	0	0	0	0
Art Smith	1	0	0	0	0	0	0	0	0	0

==== Kicking ====
Player	Extra pt.	Extra pt. Att.	FG	FGA	Long	Pct.	Pts
Clay Rush	72	89	6	16	28	0.375	90
Pete Christofilakos	12	13	0	2	0	0.000	12

== Regular season ==
=== Week 1: vs Georgia Force ===
	1	2	3	4	Total
GEO	27	14	14	14	69
ARI	17	7	21	20	65

at the US Airways Center, Phoenix, Arizona

Scoring summary:

1st Quarter:

2nd Quarter:

3rd Quarter:

4th Quarter:

=== Week 2: vs Utah Blaze ===
	1	2	3	4	Total
UTA	13	21	14	27	75
ARI	20	25	14	12	71

at the US Airways Center, Phoenix, Arizona

Scoring summary:

1st Quarter:

2nd Quarter:

3rd Quarter:

4th Quarter:

=== Week 3: at Colorado Crush ===
	1	2	3	4	Total
ARI	7	20	14	13	54
COL	14	21	7	14	56

at the Pepsi Center, Denver, Colorado

Scoring summary:

1st Quarter:

2nd Quarter:

3rd Quarter:

4th Quarter:

=== Week 4: vs Las Vegas Gladiators ===
	1	2	3	4	Total
LV	14	14	0	13	41
ARI	14	28	16	10	68

at the US Airways Center, Phoenix, Arizona

Scoring summary:

1st Quarter:

2nd Quarter:

3rd Quarter:

4th Quarter:

=== Week 5: at Kansas City Brigade ===
	1	2	3	4	OT	Total
ARI	14	13	14	14	6	61
KC	13	0	14	28	7	62

at Kemper Arena, Kansas City, Missouri

Scoring summary:

1st Quarter:

2nd Quarter:

3rd Quarter:

4th Quarter:

=== Week 6: at Los Angeles Avengers ===
	1	2	3	4	Total
ARI	0	17	21	7	45
LA	6	17	14	27	64

at the Staples Center, Los Angeles

Scoring summary:

1st Quarter:

2nd Quarter:

3rd Quarter:

4th Quarter:

=== Week 7: vs Nashville Kats ===
	1	2	3	4	Total
NSH	7	20	21	14	62
ARI	7	3	7	19	36

at the US Airways Center, Phoenix, Arizona

Scoring summary:

1st Quarter:

2nd Quarter:

3rd Quarter:

4th Quarter:

=== Week 8: at Utah Blaze ===
	1	2	3	4	Total
ARI	20	28	14	21	83
UTA	21	27	7	14	69

at EnergySolutions Arena, Salt Lake City

Scoring summary:

1st Quarter:

2nd Quarter:

3rd Quarter:

4th Quarter:

=== Week 9: at New York Dragons ===
	1	2	3	4	Total
ARI	14	13	12	6	45
NY	14	20	14	19	67

at the Nassau Coliseum, Uniondale, New York

Scoring summary:

1st Quarter:

2nd Quarter:

3rd Quarter:

4th Quarter:

=== Week 10: vs San Jose SaberCats ===
	1	2	3	4	Total
SJS	14	21	7	14	56
ARI	0	21	14	14	49

at the US Airways Center, Phoenix, Arizona

Scoring summary:

1st Quarter:

2nd Quarter:

3rd Quarter:

4th Quarter:

=== Week 11: vs Austin Wranglers ===
	1	2	3	4	Total
AUS	7	17	10	7	41
ARI	7	14	14	18	53

at the US Airways Center, Phoenix, Arizona

Scoring summary:

1st Quarter:

2nd Quarter:

3rd Quarter:

4th Quarter:

=== Week 12: at Tampa Bay Storm ===
	1	2	3	4	Total
ARI	14	20	9	7	50
TB	10	28	14	7	59

at the St. Pete Times Forum, Tampa, Florida

Scoring summary:

1st Quarter:

2nd Quarter:

3rd Quarter:

4th Quarter:

=== Week 13: vs Chicago Rush ===
	1	2	3	4	Total
CHI	3	21	14	15	53
ARI	14	0	13	20	47

at the US Airways Center, Phoenix, Arizona

Scoring summary:

1st Quarter:

2nd Quarter:

3rd Quarter:

4th Quarter:

=== Week 14: at Las Vegas Gladiators ===
	1	2	3	4	Total
ARI	7	21	6	7	41
LV	13	7	0	0	20

at Orléans Arena, Las Vegas

Scoring summary:

1st Quarter:

2nd Quarter:

3rd Quarter:

4th Quarter:

=== Week 15: vs Los Angeles Avengers ===
	1	2	3	4	Total
LA	0	20	14	21	55
ARI	17	14	14	7	52

at the US Airways Center, Phoenix, Arizona

Scoring summary:

1st Quarter:

2nd Quarter:

3rd Quarter:

4th Quarter:

=== Week 16: at San Jose SaberCats ===
	1	2	3	4	Total
ARI	13	7	6	0	26
SJS	14	24	14	14	66

at the HP Pavilion, San Jose, California

Scoring summary:

1st Quarter:

2nd Quarter:

3rd Quarter:

4th Quarter:
