= 2007 Las Vegas Gladiators season =

Arena Football League team season

- Fifth Anniversary Logo
- Head coach: Danton Barto
- Home stadium: Orleans Arena

Results
- Record: 2–14
- Division place: 5th AC Western
- Playoffs: Did not qualify

The 2007 Las Vegas Gladiators season was the 11th season for the arena football franchise, their 5th in Las Vegas. They looked to make the playoffs after finishing 2006 with a 5–11 record. They went 2–14 and missed the playoffs. This was the final season in Las Vegas, as the team moved to Cleveland to become the Cleveland Gladiators.

== Schedule ==
Week	Date	Opponent	Home/Away Game	Result
1	March 4	Austin Wranglers	Away	L 57–36
2	March 8	Grand Rapids Rampage	Away	W 79–69
3	March 18	New Orleans VooDoo	Home	L 59–31
4	March 23	Arizona Rattlers	Away	L 68–41
5	April 1	Utah Blaze	Home	L 57–47
6	April 8	Kansas City Brigade	Home	L 65–31
7	April 15	Georgia Force	Away	L 69–68
8	April 20	Colorado Crush	Away	L 63–53
9	April 29	Orlando Predators	Home	L 69–34
10	May 6	Los Angeles Avengers	Home	L 59–34
11	May 12	San Jose SaberCats	Away	L 61–34
12	May 18	Utah Blaze	Away	W 54–53
13		Bye	Week	
14	June 3	Arizona Rattlers	Home	L 41–20
15	June 10	Nashville Kats	Home	L 63–48
16	June 17	Los Angeles Avengers	Away	L 60–42
17	June 25	San Jose SaberCats	Home	L 73–46

== Coaching ==
Danton Barto entered his first season as the head coach of the Gladiators, following five seasons as a head coach in the af2.

== Stats ==
=== Offense ===
==== Quarterback ====
Player	Comp.	Att.	Comp%	Yards	TD's	INT's	Long	Rating
Shaun King	132	228	57.9	1627	27	8	45	95
Brian Jones	152	238	63.9	1824	25	9	43	97.7
Nick Rolovich	98	174	56.3	1248	23	3	45	104.8

==== Running backs ====
Player	Car.	Yards	Avg.	TD's	Long
Josh Rue	21	64	3	3	16
Brian Jones	22	53	2.4	8	16
Sidney Haugabrook	2	16	8	1	13
Marlion Jackson	18	16	.9	1	7
Shaun King	9	16	1.8	2	6
Terrance Quattlebaum	2	6	3	2	5
Nick Rolovich	6	5	.8	0	3
Thabiti Davis	2	3	1.5	1	2
Joe Douglass	2	−8	−4	0	0

==== Wide receivers ====
Player	Rec.	Yards	Avg.	TD's	Long
Thabiti Davis	123	1271	10.3	18	45
Travis LaTendresse	61	934	15.3	15	45
Joe Douglass	46	530	11.5	6	38
Kevin Prentiss	31	469	15.1	12	45
Terrance Quattlebaum	35	372	10.6	15	39
Marlion Jackson	13	163	12.5	2	32
Josh Rue	5	69	13.8	2	26
Sidney Haugabrook	4	43	10.8	1	26
Joseph Crear	1	24	24	1	24
Konrad Dean	1	5	5	1	5
Rufus Brown	1	3	3	0	3

==== Touchdowns ====
Player	TD's	Rush	Rec	Ret	Pts
Terrance Quattlebaum	19	2	17	0	116
Thabiti Davis	19	1	18	0	116
Travis LaTendresse	15	0	15	0	90
Kevin Prentiss	12	0	12	0	72
Brian Jones	8	8	0	0	48
Joe Douglass	6	0	6	0	36
Josh Rue	5	3	2	0	36
Marlion Jackson	3	1	2	0	18
Sidney Haugabrook	2	1	1	0	12
Shaun King	2	2	0	0	12
Joseph Crear	1	0	1	0	6
Konrad Dean	1	0	1	0	6

=== Defense ===
Player	Tackles	Solo	Assisted	Sack	Solo	Assisted	INT	Yards	TD's	Long
Scott Cunningham	67	60	14	0	0	0	0	0	0	0
Earthwind Moreland	55.5	50	11	0	0	0	4	67	0	26
Sarth Benoit	45.5	31	29	.5	0	1	1	10	0	10
Rufus Brown	39.5	35	9	0	0	0	0	0	0	0
Sidney Haugabrook	32.5	29	7	0	0	0	0	0	0	0
Khaleed Vaughn	32	26	12	1.5	1	1	1	0	0	0
Will Thompson	29.5	23	13	2	2	0	0	0	0	0
Karon Riley	22	18	8	2	2	0	0	0	0	0
Chris Eggleston	13.5	10	7	2	2	0	0	0	0	0
Joseph Crear	10	8	4	0	0	0	0	0	0	0
Terrance Martin	10	9	2	0	0	0	0	0	0	0
Terrance Quattlebaum	12	10	4	0	0	0	3	53	0	16
Josh Rue	8	8	0	0	0	0	0	0	0	0
Thabiti Davis	7	6	2	0	0	0	0	0	0	0
Steve Azar	6	4	4	0	0	0	0	0	0	0
Brian Jones	5.5	5	1	0	0	0	0	0	0	0
Konrad Dean	4	4	0	0	0	0	0	0	0	0
Vontez Duff	4	3	2	0	0	0	0	0	0	0
D. J. Johnson	3.5	2	3	0	0	0	0	0	0	0
Terrell McGill	3.5	3	1	0	0	0	0	0	0	0
Tony Newson	3.5	2	3	0	0	0	0	0	0	0
Carlos Joseph	2	2	0	0	0	0	0	0	0	0
Nick Rolovich	1.5	1	1	0	0	0	0	0	0	0
Derrick Crawford	1	1	0	0	0	0	0	0	0	0
Joe Douglass	1	1	0	0	0	0	0	0	0	0
Adrián González	1	1	0	0	0	0	0	0	0	0
Marlion Jackson	1	1	0	0	0	0	0	0	0	0
Shaun King	1	1	0	0	0	0	0	0	0	0
Kevin Prentiss	1	1	0	0	0	0	0	0	0	0
Travis LaTendresse	.5	0	1	0	0	0	0	0	0	0

=== Special teams ===
==== Kick return ====
Player	Ret	Yards	TD's	Long	Avg	Ret	Yards	TD's	Long	Avg
Terrance Quattlebaum	24	408	0	28	17	0	0	0	0	0
Sidney Haugabrook	25	368	0	24	14.7	0	0	0	0	0
Joe Douglass	18	358	0	50	19.9	1	8	0	8	8
Kevin Prentiss	17	281	0	45	16.5	2	16	0	16	8
Vontez Duff	8	114	0	21	14.3	0	0	0	0	0
Brian Jones	7	101	0	30	14.4	0	0	0	0	0
Marlion Jackson	3	31	0	23	10.3	0	0	0	0	0
Rufus Brown	2	29	0	17	14.5	0	0	0	0	0
Sarth Benoit	1	5	0	5	5	0	0	0	0	0
D. J. Johnson	0	0	0	0	0	1	0	0	0	0
Will Thompson	0	0	0	0	0	1	0	0	0	0

==== Kicking ====
Player	Extra pt.	Extra pt. Att.	FG	FGA	Long	Pct.	Pts
Steve Azar	82	92	9	18	44	0.500	109
