= 2006 Kansas City Brigade season =

Arena Football League team season

- Head coach: Kevin Porter
- Home stadium: Kemper Arena

Results
- Record: 3–13
- Division place: 5th
- Playoffs: Did not qualify

The 2006 Kansas City Brigade season was the opening season for the franchise. After the announcement that the New Orleans VooDoo would suspend operations for the 2006 AFL season due to Hurricane Katrina, the AFL awarded an expansion franchise to Kansas City. Kevin Porter was the team's first head coach. They would be placed in the NC Southern, where they would take New Orleans' spot for the year.

== Regular season schedule ==
Week	Date	Opponent	Home/Away Game	Result
1	January 29	Dallas Desperados	Away	L 58–44
2	February 3	Orlando Predators	Away	L 48–41
3	February 12	Austin Wranglers	Home	L 37–33
4	February 19	Columbus Destroyers	Home	W 45–24
5	February 24	Georgia Force	Away	L 51–19
6	March 5	Tampa Bay Storm	Home	L 69–59
7	March 13	Philadelphia Soul	Home	L 54–24
8	March 18	Austin Wranglers	Away	L 64–37
9	March 24	New York Dragons	Away	L 54–48
10	April 1	Georgia Force	Home	L 55–47
11	April 9	Los Angeles Avengers	Home	W 62–45
12	April 16	Colorado Crush	Home	L 55–49
13	April 22	Nashville Kats	Away	W 58–52
14	April 29	Tampa Bay Storm	Away	L 58–42
15	May 6	Orlando Predators	Home	L 63–42
16	May 12	Utah Blaze	Away	L 55–54

== Coaching ==
Kevin Porter was the Brigade's first head coach.

== Stats ==
=== Offense ===
==== Passing ====
Player	Comp.	Att.	Comp%	Yards	TD's	INT's	Rating
Andy Kelly	177	294	60.2	1856	24	13	80.5
Chris Sanders	185	279	66.3	2025	36	10	104.9
Raymond Philyaw	43	63	68.3	424	7	1	108.2

==== Rushing ====
Player	Car.	Yards	Avg.	TD's	Long
Chris Sander	46	115	2.5	13	13
Dawan Moss	33	90	2.7	6	19
Byron Douzart	24	53	2.2	5	18
Jerel Myers	7	17	2.4	2	7
Jeremy Beutler	7	11	1.6	0	7
Raymond Philyaw	2	8	4	1	9
Sam Simmons	1	6	6	0	6
Aaron Boone	1	4	4	0	4
John Booth	1	0	0	0	0

==== Receiving ====
Player	Rec.	Yards	Avg.	TD's	Long
Jerel Meyers	122	1245	10.2	16	46
James Jordan	69	797	11.6	14	45
Aaron Boone	66	748	11.3	19	40
Sam Simmons	24	221	9.2	2	34
Calvin Spears	15	152	10.1	2	17
Rob Johnson	15	137	9.1	2	32
John Booth	11	104	9.5	2	39
Brian Poli-Dixon	6	40	6.7	0	11
Aaron Hamilton	4	32	8	0	8
Bryan Henderson	3	34	11.3	2	23
B.J. Cohen	3	33	11	0	11
Nathan Black	2	15	7.5	0	9
Tremaine Neal	3	14	4.7	0	6
Jeremy Beutler	1	12	12	0	12
Cyron Brown	1	9	9	0	9

==== Touchdowns ====
Player	TD's	Rush	Rec	Ret	Pts
Aaron Boone	19	0	19	0	118
Jerel Myers	18	2	16	0	110
James Jordan	14	0	14	0	84
Chris Sanders	13	13	0	0	80
Dawan Moss	6	6	0	0	36
Bryon Douzart	5	5	0	0	30
Sam Simmons	3	0	2	1	18
John Booth	2	0	2	0	12
Bryan Henderson	2	0	2	0	12
Rob Johnson	2	0	2	0	12
Calvin Spears	2	0	2	0	12
Raymond Philyaw	1	1	0	0	6
Lucas Yarnell	1	0	0	1	6

=== Defense ===
Player	Tackles	Solo	Assisted	Sack	Solo	Assisted	INT	Yards	TD's	Long
Chris Pointer	74.5	61	27	0	0	0	1	16	0	16
Travis Coleman	59	50	18	0	0	0	0	0	0	0
Denario Smalls	58	50	16	0	0	0	3	39	1	39
Calvin Spears	51.5	41	21	0	0	0	2	0	0	0
Byron Douzart	42.5	32	21	0	0	0	1	0	0	0
James Jordan	32.5	27	11	0	0	0	0	0	0	0
Sam Simmons	19.5	18	3	0	0	0	0	0	0	0
B.J. Cohen	19	13	12	3.5	3	1	0	0	0	0
Gillis Wilson	17.5	10	15	4	4	0	0	0	0	0
Cyron Brown	15.5	11	9	4.5	4	1	0	0	0	0
Rob Johnson	15	8	14	0	0	0	0	0	0	0
Jeremy Beutler	14.5	7	15	1	1	0	0	0	0	0
Jerel Myers	13.5	12	3	0	0	0	0	0	0	0
Dawan Moss	12.5	10	5	0	0	0	0	0	0	0
Bryan Henderson	11	9	4	2	2	0	0	0	0	0
Michael Landry	11	6	10	.5	0	1	0	0	0	0
Brian Poli-Dixon	8	7	2	0	0	0	0	0	0	0
Aaron Hamilton	8	4	4	1	1	0	0	0	0	0
Aaron Boone	6	4	4	0	0	0	0	0	0	0
Chad Pegues	6	4	4	1	1	0	0	0	0	0
Lucas Yarnell	6	2	8	0	0	0	0	0	0	0
Alvin Porter	5.5	4	3	0	0	0	0	0	0	0
Tremaine Neal	5	3	4	0	0	0	0	0	0	0
Chris Sanders	4.5	4	1	0	0	0	0	0	0	0
Tim Seder	3	2	2	0	0	0	0	0	0	0
Cliff Green	2.5	2	1	0	0	0	0	0	0	0
Kyle Rasmussen	2.5	1	3	0	0	0	0	0	0	0
MacKenzie Hoambrecker	2	2	0	0	0	0	0	0	0	0
Jon McCall	2	2	0	0	0	0	0	0	0	0
Nathan Black	1.5	1	1	0	0	0	0	0	0	0
John Booth	1.5	1	1	0	0	0	0	0	0	0

=== Special teams ===
==== Kick return ====
Player	Kick Ret	Yards	TD's	Long	Avg	FG Ret	Yards	TD's	Long	Avg
Sam Simmons	30	593	1	55	19.8	0	0	0	0	0
Denario Smalls	7	133	0	29	19	0	0	0	0	0
Jerel Myers	6	107	0	26	17.8	1	17	0	17	17
Aaron Boone	4	52	0	21	13	0	0	0	0	0
Calvin Spears	1	5	0	5	5	0	0	0	0	0
Travis Coleman	1	0	0	0	0	0	0	0	0	0
Chris Sanders	0	0	0	0	0	1	0	0	0	0
Time Seder	0	0	0	0	0	1	0	0	0	0
Lucas Yarnell	0	0	0	0	0	1	0	1	0	0

==== Kicking ====
Player	Extra pt.	Extra pt. Att.	FG	FGA	Long	Pct.	Pts
MacKenzie Hoambrecker	47	57	2	8	34	0.250	53
Tim Seder	23	32	8	21	43	0.381	47

=== Week 1: at Dallas Desperados ===
	1	2	3	4	Total
KC	0	16	14	14	44
DAL	7	17	13	21	58

at American Airlines Center, Dallas, Texas

- Game time: January 29, 2006 at 2:00 p.m. CST
- Game attendance: 11,571
- Officials: Steve Pamon, Wes Fritz, Neil Brunner, R.G. Detillier, Tony Lombardo

=== Week 2: at Orlando Predators ===
	1	2	3	4	Total
KC	7	14	0	20	41
ORL	10	14	7	17	48

at TD Waterhouse Centre, Orlando, Florida

- Game time: February 3, 2006 at 7:30 p.m. EST
- Game attendance: 13,512
- Officials: Riley Johnson, Rick Podraza, Julian Mapp, Paul Engelberts, Bud McCleskey, Buddy Ward

=== Week 3: vs Austin Wranglers ===
	1	2	3	4	Total
AUS	10	14	6	7	37
KC	7	10	14	2	33

at Kemper Arena, Kansas City, Missouri

- Game time: February 12, 2006 at 1:00 p.m. CST
- Game attendance: 16,523
- Officials: David Cutaia, Doug Wilson, Kavin McGrath, Darrel Leftwich, Rich Wilborn, Bob Mantooth
- Offensive Player of the Game: Jerel Myers (KC)
- Defensive Player of the Game: Donvetis Franklin (AUS)
- Ironman of the Game: Kevin Nickerson (AUS)

=== Week 4: vs Columbus Destroyers ===
	1	2	3	4	Total
CLB	0	10	0	14	24
KC	6	15	7	17	45

at Kemper Arena, Kansas City, Missouri

- Game time: February 19, 2006 at 1:00 p.m. CST
- Game attendance: 14,632
- Officials: Tom McCabe, Paul Frerking, Brent Durbin, Bob McElwee, Keith Washington

=== Week 5: at Georgia Force ===
	1	2	3	4	Total
KC	2	14	3	0	19
GEO	14	17	7	13	51

at Philips Arena, Atlanta, Georgia

- Game time: February 24, 2006 at 6:30 p.m. CST
- Game attendance: 11,623
- Officials: Dennie Lipski, Rick Nelson, Kavin McGrath, Darrell Leftwich, Rich Wilbon, Bob Mantooth

=== Week 6: vs Tampa Bay Storm ===
	1	2	3	4	Total
TB	14	20	21	14	69
KC	7	26	14	12	59

at Kemper Arena, Kansas City, Missouri

- Game time: March 5, 2006 at 3:00 p.m. CST
- Game attendance: 15,227
- Officials: Pat Garvey, Paul King, Mike McCabe, Wayne Mackie, Dino Paganelli

=== Week 7: vs Philadelphia Soul ===
	1	2	3	4	Total
PHI	13	35	3	3	54
KC	0	12	0	12	24

at Kemper Arena, Kansas City, Missouri

- Game time: March 13, 2006 at 7:00 p.m. CST
- Game attendance: 15,379
- Officials: Bill LeMonnier, Mike Delaney, Kelly Saalfeld, Paul Engleberts, Billy Beckett

=== Week 8: at Austin Wranglers ===
	1	2	3	4	Total
KC	7	17	7	6	37
AUS	14	24	14	12	64

at Frank Erwin Center, Austin, Texas

- Game time: March 18, 2006 at 7:00 p.m. CST
- Game attendance: 9,184
- Officials: Steve Pamon, Wes Fritz, Neil Brunner, R.G. Detillier, Tony Lombardo

=== Week 9: at New York Dragons ===
	1	2	3	4	Total
KC	7	6	14	21	48
NYD	14	21	6	13	54

at Nassau Veterans Memorial Coliseum, Uniondale, New York

- Game time: March 24, 2006 at 7:30 p.m. EST
- Game attendance: 10,758
- Officials: Bill Athan, Matt Jordan, Tom Podraza, Tom Symonette, Greg Wilson

=== Week 10: vs Georgia Force ===
	1	2	3	4	Total
GEO	7	21	14	13	55
KC	14	14	6	13	47

at Kemper Arena, Kansas City, Missouri

- Game time: April 1, 2006 at 7:00 p.m. CST
- Game attendance: 16,032
- Officials: Bill McCabe, Jeff Carr, Julian Mapp, Darrell Leftwich, Bud McCleskey

=== Week 11: vs Los Angeles Avengers ===
	1	2	3	4	Total
LA	7	21	7	10	45
KC	13	21	7	21	62

at Kemper Arena, Kansas City, Missouri

- Game time: April 9, 2006 at 12:00 p.m. CDT
- Game attendance: 15,173
- Officials: David Cutaia, Paul Frerking, Greg Shields, Dave Chesney, James Cole

=== Week 12: vs Colorado Crush ===
	1	2	3	4	Total
COL	14	21	14	6	55
KC	13	7	7	22	49

at Kemper Arena, Kansas City, Missouri

- Game time: April 16, 2006 at 12:00 p.m. CDT
- Game attendance: 12,814
- Officials: Steve Pamon, Wes Fritz, Neil Brunner, R.G. Detillier, Tony Lombardo

=== Week 13: at Nashville Kats ===
	1	2	3	4	Total
KC	6	24	7	21	58
NAS	7	14	21	10	52

at Gaylord Entertainment Center, Nashville, Tennessee

- Game time: April 22, 2006 at 7:00 p.m. CDT
- Game attendance: 8,214
- Officials: Riley Johnson, Rick Podraza, Allen Baynes, Paul Engelberts, Bud McCleskey

=== Week 14: at Tampa Bay Storm ===
	1	2	3	4	Total
KC	7	7	14	14	42
TB	14	17	20	7	58

at St. Pete Times Forum, Tampa, Florida

- Game time: April 29, 2006 at 7:30 p.m. EDT
- Game attendance: 17,143
- Officials: Bill Athan, Rick Podraza, Tim Podraza, Tim Symonette, Greg Wilson

=== Week 15: vs Orlando Predators ===
	1	2	3	4	Total
ORL	21	14	14	14	63
KC	6	7	21	8	42

at Kemper Arena, Kansas City, Missouri

- Game time: May 6, 2006 at 7:00 p.m. CDT
- Game attendance: 16,095
- Officials: Dennis Lipski, Rick Nelson, Kavin McGrath, Darrell Leftwich, Rich Wilborn

=== Week 16: at Utah Blaze ===
	1	2	3	4	Total
KC	14	14	7	19	54
UTA	7	17	14	17	55

at Delta Center, Salt Lake City, Utah

- Game time: May 12, 2006 at 7:00 p.m. MDT
- Game attendance: 16,855
- Officials: David Cutaia, Doug Wilson, Greg Shields, Dave Chesney, James Cole
