= Joe Todd =

Joe Todd may refer to:

- Joe Todd (footballer), New Zealand footballer
- Joe Todd (American football), American football linebacker

== See also ==
- Joseph Todd, American football defensive back
