= Steve Smith (wide receiver, born 1974) =

American gridiron football player (born 1974)

No. 84
- Position: Offensive specialist

Personal information
- Born: May 30, 1974 (age 52); Belle Glade, Florida, U.S.
- Listed height: 5 ft 9 in (1.75 m)
- Listed weight: 190 lb (86 kg)

Career information
- High school: Glades Central (Belle Glade, Florida)
- College: Utah State
- NFL draft: 1998: undrafted

Career history
- Toronto Argonauts (1998); Flint Flames (2000); Birmingham Thunderbolts (2001); Buffalo Destroyers (2001); Grand Rapids Rampage (2002–2004); Philadelphia Soul (2005–2006); Kansas City Brigade (2006)

Awards and highlights
- 1997 Humanitarian Bowl MVP

Career AFL statistics
- Receptions: 418
- Receiving yards: 5,059
- Touchdowns: 106
- Kick returns / Yards: 228 / 4,810
- Return touchdowns: 11
- Stats at ArenaFan.com

Steve Smith (born May 30, 1974) is an American former arena football offensive specialist. He played college football at Utah State. He was originally signed as an undrafted free agent by the Toronto Argonauts of the Canadian Football League (CFL).

In his career, Smith also played for the Buffalo Destroyers, Grand Rapids Rampage, Philadelphia Soul, and Kansas City Brigade. While he spent most of his career in the Arena Football League (AFL), he did spend time in the original Indoor Football League (IFL) as a member of the Flint Flames, as well as the short-lived XFL as a member of the Birmingham Thunderbolts.

== College career ==
=== Junior college ===
Smith first attended Independence Community Junior College where he was an option quarterback for his freshman season. He then transferred to Chaffey Junior College where he converted to wide receiver. After the team started the season 0-3, he was switched back to quarterback. He went on to be a junior college All-America selection. Chaffey College Team MVP foothill conference offensive player of the year, bowl game MVP California juco's first team quarterback

=== Utah State ===
In February 1996, he signed to play football at Utah State University as a wide receiver and kick returner. He majored in sociology. As a junior in 1996, he appeared in 11 games. He recorded 32 receptions for 555 yards, and two touchdowns. He carried the ball five times for 69 yards and one touchdown. He returned 17 kickoff returns for 308 yards, he also returned six punts for 20 yards. In 1997 as a senior, he recorded 37 receptions for 686 yards and three touchdowns. He carried the ball 11 times fr 66 yards. He also returned 22 kickoffs for 439 yards as well as 22 punts for 344 yards and two touchdowns. As a senior, he was a First-team All-Big West selection as a kick returner. He led the conference in punt returns, (15.6 avg.). After recording four receptions for 136 yards, one touchdown and returning two puts for 26 yards and two kickoffs for 58 yards, he was named the Most Valuable Player (MVP) of the 1997 Humanitarian Bowl. Football Team MVP, offensive player of the year, special teams player of the year, AT&T 81yards TD longest catch of the year, and most inspiration player of the year

== Professional career ==
After going unselected in the 1998 NFL draft, Smith signed with the Toronto Argonauts of the Canadian Football League (CFL). He was out of football in 1999 and in 2000 he spent time with the Flint Flames of the original Indoor Football League. In 2001, he joined the Birmingham Thunderbolts of the short-lived XFL. While with the Thunderbolts, he recorded eight receptions for 54 yards, and one carry for 13 yards.

=== Return to arena football ===
Shortly after the XFL season ended, Smith joined the Buffalo Destroyers of the Arena Football League (AFL) as an offensive specialist. For the 2001 season, he recorded, six receptions for 62 yards and one touchdown, as well as one kick return for 20 yards.

In 2002, he joined the Grand Rapids Rampage. For the season, he recorded 72 receptions for 872 yards and 26 touchdowns, and two carries for four yards and one touchdown. He recorded eight tackles and also returned three kicks for 37 yards. In 2003 he recorded 91 receptions for 1,071 yards and 27 touchdowns. He also carried the ball twice for four yards and one touchdown. He recorded 19 total tackles. He also returned 21 kicks for 566 yards and three touchdowns. In 2004, his final in Grand Rapids, he recorded 59 receptions for 658 yards and 10 touchdowns. He carried the ball twice for a loss of one yard. He recorded one total tackle. He also returned 71 kicks for 1,683 yards and five touchdowns. 2002 Team MVP, 2003 Team MVP 2004 MVP also finish number one in the league kickreturns 5 Touchdowns

In 2005, Smith joined the Philadelphia Soul. In his first game with the Soul, he recorded five touchdown receptions from quarterback Tony Graziani. On the season, Smith recorded 107 receptions for 1,443 and 28 touchdowns, and five carries for a loss of one yard. He recorded four tackles. He also returned 74 kicks for 1,523 yards and three touchdowns. In 2006, while with the Soul, he recorded 41 receptions for 419 yards and five touchdowns. He recorded one tackle. He also returned 20 kicks for 329 yards. Part way through the 2006 season, he joined the Kansas City Brigade where he recorded 42 receptions for 534 yards and nine touchdowns. He carried the ball twice for nine yards. He recorded one tackle. He also returned 38 kicks for 652 yards.2005 Team MVP Philadelphia soul

== Career statistics ==
Season			Receiving					Rushing					Tackles			Kick returns				
Year	Team	League	Rec	Yds	Avg	Lng.	TD	Att	Yds	Avg	Lng.	TD	Solo.	Asst.	Total	Ret.	Yds.	Avg.	Lng	TD
2001	BIR	XFL	8	84	6.8	15	1	1	13	13.0	13	0	0	0	0	0	0	0	0	0
2001	BUF	AFL	6	62	10.3	--	1	0	0	0	0	0	0	0	0	1	20	20.0	20	0
2002	GR	AFL	72	872	12.1	--	26	0	0	0	0	0	7	1	8	3	37	12.3	--	0
2003	GR	AFL	91	1,071	11.8	--	27	2	4	2.0	--	1	9	5	14	21	566	27.0	--	3
2004	GR	AFL	59	658	11.2	--	10	2	-1	-0.5	--	0	0	1	1	71	1,683	23.7	--	5
2005	PHI	AFL	107	1,443	13.5	--	28	5	-1	-0.2	--	0	4	0	4	74	1,523	20.6	--	3
2006	PHI	AFL	41	419	10.2	--	5	0	0	0.0	0	0	0	1	1	20	329	16.5	--	0
2006	KC	AFL	42	534	12.7	--	9	2	9	4.5	--	0	1	0	1	38	652	17.2	--	0
Career			418	5,059	12.1	--	106	11	11	1.0	--	1	21	8	29	228	4,810	21.1	--	11
