= South Salem High School =

Public school in Salem, Oregon, U.S.

Location
- 1910 Church St SE; Salem, Marion County, Oregon 97302; United States; 44.922410°N 123.038963°W

Information
- Type: Public
- Opened: 1954
- School district: Salem-Keizer School District
- Principal: Tara Romine
- Staff: 99.07 (FTE)
- Grades: 9-12
- Enrollment: 2,310 (2023-2024)
- Student to teacher ratio: 23.32
- Colors: Columbia blue and scarlet
- Athletics conference: OSAA Central Valley Conference 6A-7
- Mascot: Saxons
- Rival: Sprague High School
- Newspaper: The Clypian
- Feeder schools: Houck Middle School, Judson Middle School, Leslie Middle School
- Website: south.salkeiz.k12.or.us

South Salem High School (SSHS) is a public high school in Salem, Oregon. It was built in 1954 as the second public high school in the city. After South Salem opened, the former Salem High School was renamed North Salem High School.

== History ==
South Salem High School is not the first school to be built on the current site. The former Leslie Middle School was built in 1927, and South Salem was connected to it when it was constructed in 1954. The schools shared common facilities, including the cafeteria and auditorium. When the middle school was moved in 1997, the old building became home to Howard Street Charter School. The Howard Street building was demolished in 2020.

== Academics ==
South Salem offers the International Baccalaureate program in the 11th and 12th grades, as well as a preparatory Honors program for 9th and 10th grades. The first graduating class to have spent 4 years with the IB program was the class of 2002.

In 1987, South Salem High School was honored in the Blue Ribbon Schools Program, the highest honor a school can receive in the United States.

In 2008, 78% of the school's seniors received their high school diploma. Of 466 students, 364 graduated, 69 dropped out, 1 received a modified diploma, and 32 are still in high school.

== Athletics ==
=== Boys' basketball program ===
The men's basketball team has been one of the most successful programs in Salem, Oregon. South Salem has produced 15 plus D1 basketball recruits in program history. Some previous Saxon players have chosen to play at Stanford, UCLA, BYU, Oregon, Washington, Hawaii, and other schools. South Salem has won state titles in 1996 and 2004.

=== State championships ===
- Football: 1954, 1971
- Cheerleading: 2026
- Boys tennis: 1955, 1957
- Boys track: 1959
- Boys cross country: 1959, 1960, 1962
- Boys golf: 1964, 1989, 1991, 1992
- Girls tennis: 1968
- Girls basketball: 1976, 2015, 2016
- Girls golf: 1984
- Baseball: 1991
- Boys basketball: 1996, 2004
- Boys Soccer: 2009
- Girls Softball: 2014

== Music ==
South Salem High School's music department has been nationally recognized as a Gold school in the Grammy Signature School program. South Salem High School's top music groups, which include the symphonic choir, wind ensemble, string orchestra, symphony orchestra, and various jazz ensembles have combined for a total of 46 OSAA state championships (as of 2025), since the OSAA started sponsored music state championships starting in 1987. The Wind Ensemble also performed in Shanghai and Beijing during the 2008 Summer Olympics in China.

=== OSAA state championships ===
- Choir: 1987, 1988, 1991, 1992, 1995, 1996, 1999, 2000, 2001, 2002, 2010, 2014, 2016, 2019, 2023. (15 total state titles)
- Band: 1987, 1990, 1991, 1993, 1997, 2000, 2003, 2004, 2005, 2006, 2007, 2008. (12 total state titles)
- String orchestra: 2001, 2004, 2007, 2014, 2018, 2019, 2022, 2024, 2025, 2026. (10 total state titles)
- Full orchestra: 1995, 2000, 2005, 2007, 2010, 2012, 2015, 2022, 2024, 2025. (10 total state titles)

== Notable alumni ==
- Ann Aiken, United States District Court judge, class of 1970
- Deen Castronovo, drummer for Journey and Bad English
- Joe Douglass, American football wide receiver and linebacker, class of 1992
- Craig Hanneman, NFL defensive lineman, class of 1967
- Pat Healy, state finalist wrestler; current mixed martial artist formerly competing in the Ultimate Fighting Championship
- Dan Heder, producer and animator, class of 1996
- Jon Heder, actor, class of 1996
- Bob Horn, NFL linebacker, class of 1972
- William L. Sullivan, author of outdoor guide books
- Stephen E. Thorsett, astronomer and president of Willamette University
- Michael Totten, journalist and writer
