= Reggie Johnson (American football) =

American football player (born 1968)

No. 89, 82, 80, 85, 88, 83
- Position: Tight end

Personal information
- Born: January 27, 1968 (age 58); Pensacola, Florida, U.S.
- Listed height: 6 ft 2 in (1.88 m)
- Listed weight: 256 lb (116 kg)

Career information
- High school: Escambia (Pensacola)
- College: Florida State
- NFL draft: 1991: 2nd round, 30th overall pick

Career history
- Denver Broncos (1991–1993); Cincinnati Bengals (1994)*; Green Bay Packers (1994); Philadelphia Eagles (1995); Kansas City Chiefs (1996); Green Bay Packers (1997); Birmingham Thunderbolts (2001)
- * Offseason or practice squad member only

Awards and highlights
- Second Team All-South Independent (1990)

Career NFL statistics
- Receptions: 66
- Receiving yards: 791
- Touchdowns: 6
- Stats at Pro Football Reference

Reginald Roosevelt Johnson (born January 27, 1968) is an American former professional football player who was a tight end for seven seasons in the National Football League (NFL) for the Denver Broncos (1991–1993), Green Bay Packers (1994, 1997), Philadelphia Eagles (1995), and Kansas City Chiefs (1996). He played college football for the Florida State Seminoles and was selected in the second round of the 1991 NFL draft by the Broncos.

Pre-draft measurables
Height	Weight	Arm length	Hand span	40-yard dash	10-yard split	20-yard split	Vertical jump	Broad jump	Bench press
6 ft 1 5/8 in (1.87 m)	256 lb (116 kg)	32 in (0.81 m)	10 1/2 in (0.27 m)	4.73 s	1.65 s	2.82 s	34.5 in (0.88 m)	9 ft 9 in (2.97 m)	19 reps
