= James Bostic =

American football player (born 1972)

No. 27, 33
- Position: Running back

Personal information
- Born: March 13, 1972 (age 54); Fort Lauderdale, Florida, U.S.
- Listed height: 5 ft 11 in (1.80 m)
- Listed weight: 230 lb (104 kg)

Career information
- High school: Dillard (Fort Lauderdale)
- College: Auburn
- NFL draft: 1994: 3rd round, 83rd overall pick

Career history
- Los Angeles / St. Louis Rams (1994–1995); Green Bay Packers (1996); Kansas City Chiefs (1998)*; Miami Dolphins (1998); Philadelphia Eagles (1998-1999); Birmingham Thunderbolts (2001)
- * Offseason or practice squad member only

Awards and highlights
- Super Bowl champion (XXXI); 2× First-team All-SEC (1992, 1993)

Career NFL statistics
- Rushing yards: 19
- Rushing average: 3.8
- Receptions: 5
- Receiving yards: 8
- Stats at Pro Football Reference

James Edward Bostic (born March 13, 1972) is an American former professional football player who was a running back in the National Football League (NFL). He played college football for the Auburn Tigers. He played in the NFL for the Philadelphia Eagles, and also played in the defunct XFL.

During the 1993 season with Auburn, James was the leading running back in the Southeastern Conference. He led the conference with 1,205 yards in 199 attempts in 11 games. He averaged 6.1 YPC, scored 12 touchdown's, and averaged 109.6 YDSPG.

He was selected in the third round of the 1994 NFL draft by the Los Angeles Rams, but never played for the team. Bostic was briefly signed to the practice squad of the Miami Dolphins but was waived on September 30, 1998. Bostic eventually signed with the Philadelphia Eagles for the 1998 and 1999 seasons. He appeared in 11 total games for Philadelphia, with five rushing attempts for 19 yards and five receptions for eight yards, all in the 1999 season.

In 2001, Bostic was the starting running back for the XFL's Birmingham Thunderbolts. He led the XFL in rushing attempts that year with 153, and was third in rushing yards with 536.

In 2004, Bostic had a tryout for the NFL's Miami Dolphins. Bostic retired from professional football shortly after.

He lives in Coral Springs, Florida, where he serves as a police officer.
