= Brad Palazzo =

American football player (born 1975)

No. 5
- Position: Kicker / Punter

Personal information
- Born: June 29, 1975 (age 51); Gulfport, Mississippi, U.S.
- Listed height: 5 ft 9 in (1.75 m)
- Listed weight: 185 lb (84 kg)

Career information
- High school: Gulfport
- College: Tulane
- NFL draft: 1999: undrafted

Career history
- Green Bay Packers (1999)*; Nashville Kats (2000); New England Sea Wolves (2001)*; Birmingham Thunderbolts (2001)
- * Offseason or practice squad member only

Awards and highlights
- Third-team All-American (1997)

Career XFL statistics
- FGM / FGA: 7 / 14
- Field goal percentage: 50%
- Longest field goal: 46
- Punts: 40
- Punt yards: 1,447
- Net yards: 24.9
- Stats at ArenaFan.com

Marcus Brad Palazzo (born June 29, 1975) is an American former professional football player who was a placekicker and punter. He played college football for the Tulane Green Wave. He was originally signed as an undrafted free agent by the Green Bay Packers of the National Football League (NFL).

== Early life ==
Palazzo attended Gulfport High School, where he was an All-State, All-Coast selection as a placekicker. He was played as a quarterback during his senior season.

== College career ==
Palazzo attended Tulane University, where he majored in sports management. As a redshirt freshman in 1995, he appeared in 11 games. He recorded six-of-eight (75%) on field goals and 17-of-18 (94.4%) on extra points. He also punted once for 31 yards. In 1996 as a redshirt sophomore, he made 12-of-15 (80%) field goals and 21-of-21 (100%) extra points. He also punted twice for 62 yards. As redshirt junior, in 1997, he made 23-of-28 (82.1%) field goals and 40-of-41 (97.6%) extra points. In 1998 as a redshirt senior, he made nine-of-17 (52.9%) field goals and 73-of-73 (100%) extra points. For his career, he made 50-of-68 (73.5%) field goals and 151-of-153 extra points.

== Professional career ==
After going undrafted in the 1999 NFL draft, Palazzo joined the Green Bay Packers of the National Football League (NFL). The following year, he joined the Nashville Kats of the Arena Football League (AFL). While with the Kats, he made three-of-seven field goals, 15-of-16 extra points, and recorded two tackles. On April 11, 2000, he was traded by the Kats to the New England Sea Wolves. On May 22, the Sea Wolves placed him on re-callable waivers. He then joined the Birmingham Thunderbolts of the XFL where he played both kicker and punter.
