= Quincy Jackson =

American gridiron football player (born 1977)

No. 82
- Position: Wide receiver

Personal information
- Born: April 2, 1977 (age 49); Brundidge, Alabama, U.S.
- Listed height: 6 ft 0 in (1.83 m)
- Listed weight: 194 lb (88 kg)

Career information
- High school: Pike (Brundidge, Alabama)
- College: Alabama
- NFL draft: 1999: undrafted

Career history
- Cincinnati Bengals (1999)*; Albany/Indiana Firebirds (2000–2002); Birmingham Thunderbolts (2001); Edmonton Eskimos (2001); Saskatchewan Roughriders (2001–2003); Edmonton Eskimos (2003)
- * Offseason or practice squad member only

Awards and highlights
- Grey Cup champion (2003)

Career AFL statistics
- Receptions: 68
- Receiving yards: 954
- Avg.: 14
- Touchdowns: 16

Career CFL statistics
- Receptions: 102
- Receiving yards: 1,397
- Avg.: 13.7
- Touchdowns: 8
- Stats at ArenaFan.com

Quincy Jackson (born April 2, 1977) is a former gridiron football wide receiver. He played college football at Alabama Crimson Tide football. He was signed as an undrafted free agent by the Cincinnati Bengals of the National Football League (NFL).

== College career ==
Jackson attended East Mississippi Junior College, where he recorded 43 receptions for 1,170 yards and 12 touchdown as a sophomore. He was also a junior college All-American. In 1997, he transferred to the University of Alabama. As a junior, he recorded 29 receptions for 472 yards and three touchdowns. As a senior, in 1998, he recorded 48 receptions for 621 yards and four touchdowns. In his two seasons at Alabama, he recorded 77 receptions for 1,093 yards and seven touchdowns.

== Professional career ==
=== Playing in America ===
After going unselected in the 1999 NFL draft, Jackson was signed by the Cincinnati Bengals. After being released by the Bengals, he joined the Albany Firebirds of the Arena Football League (AFL). While with the Firebirds, he recorded 68 receptions for 954 yards and 16 touchdowns. The next year, he joined the Birmingham Thunderbolts of the short-lived XFL. While there, he recorded 45 receptions for 531 yards (11.8 avg.) and six touchdowns.

=== Canadian Football League (CFL) ===
Following the XFL season, he joined the Edmonton Eskimos of the Canadian Football League (CFL). In his first season in the CFL, he recorded 46 receptions for 777 yards and four touchdowns. In 2002, he joined the Saskatchewan Roughriders. For the season, he recorded 37 receptions for 407 yards and four touchdowns. In 2003, he recorded spent the first half of the season with the Roughriders, appearing in nine games, recording 12 receptions for 112 yards. He then re-joined the Edmonton Eskimos and appeared in the final nine games of the season, recording seven receptions for 101 yards.

=== Career statistics ===
Season			Receiving					Rushing					Kick returns				
Year	Team	League	Rec	Yds	Avg	Lng.	TD	Att	Yds	Avg	Lng.	TD	Ret.	Yds.	Avg.	Lng	TD
2000	ALB	AFL	68	954	14.0	--	16	1	2	2.0	2	1	8	39	4.9	--	0
2000	BIR	XFL	45	531	11.8	--	6	0	0.0	0	0	0	0	0	0	0	0
2001	EDM	CFL	46	777	16.9	--	4	0	0.0	0	0	0	0	0	0	0	0
2002	SK	CFL	37	407	11.0	--	4	0	0.0	0	0	0	0	0	0	0	0
2003	SK	CFL	12	112	9.3	--	0	0	0.0	0	0	0	0	0	0	0	0
2003	EDM	CFL	7	101	14.4	--	0	0	0.0	0	0	0	0	0	0	0	0
Career			167	2,882	17.3	--	30	1	2	2.0	2	1	8	39	4.9	--	0

== See also ==
- Alabama Crimson Tide football yearly statistical leaders
