= Terrance Martin =

American football player (born 1979)

No. 90, 98
- Position: Nose tackle

Personal information
- Born: July 6, 1979 (age 47); Toano, Virginia, U.S.
- Listed height: 6 ft 2 in (1.88 m)
- Listed weight: 323 lb (147 kg)

Career information
- High school: Lafayette (Williamsburg, Virginia)
- College: NC State
- NFL draft: 2003: undrafted

Career history
- Houston Texans (2003); Cincinnati Bengals (2004); Las Vegas Gladiators (2007)

Career NFL statistics
- Total tackles: 7
- Kick returns: 1
- Kick return yards: 0
- Games played: 14
- Games started: 1
- Stats at Pro Football Reference

Terrance Martin (born July 6, 1979) is an American former professional football player who was a nose tackle in the National Football League (NFL). He playedcollege football for the NC State Wolfpack. He played in 14 games over two seasons in the NFL with the Houston Texans and Cincinnati Bengals. He also played in the Arena Football League (AFL) in 2007.

== Early life and college ==
Martin played high school football at Lafayette High School in Williamsburg, Virginia. Towards the end of his time there, he was recruited and signed by West Virginia University (WVU). However, academic problems made him ineligible to enroll and play football at WVU. He instead opted to go to Hinds Community College for two years after which he transferred to North Carolina State.

== Professional career ==
=== NFL ===
==== 2003 season ====
After Martin went undrafted in the 2003 NFL draft, he signed with the Houston Texans in May 2003. In the regular season that year, he played 12 games (starting in one of them). He registered six total tackles, and he also had a kick return for no yardage.

==== 2004 season ====
On September 4, 2004, the Texans released Martin.

Later that year, he was signed by the Cincinnati Bengals. He appeared in two regular season games, registering one tackle.

The Bengals waived Martin on June 20, 2005.

=== Arena Football League ===
Martin played arena football with the Las Vegas Gladiators during their 2007 season.
