= Anthony Blevins =

American football player and coach (born 1976)

Chicago Bears
- Title: Assistant special teams coordinator

Personal information
- Born: July 23, 1976 (age 50); Birmingham, Alabama, U.S.
- Listed height: 5 ft 10 in (1.78 m)
- Listed weight: 170 lb (77 kg)

Career information
- Position: Defensive back
- High school: Pleasant Grove (Pleasant Grove, Alabama)
- College: UAB
- NFL draft: 1999: undrafted

Career history

Playing
- Mobile Admirals (1999); Birmingham Steeldogs (2000); Birmingham Thunderbolts (2001)

Coaching
- Meadowcreek HS (GA) (2003–2004) Secondary coach; Mississippi State (2005–2007) Graduate assistant; UT Martin (2008) Cornerbacks coach; Tennessee State (2009–2011) Special teams coordinator & cornerbacks coach; UAB (2012) Cornerbacks coach; Arizona Cardinals (2013–2017) Assistant special teams coach; New York Giants (2018–2022); Assistant special teams coach (2018–2019); Assistant defensive backs coach (2020); Assistant linebackers coach & special teams assistant (2021); Assistant special teams coach (2022); Birmingham Stallions (2024) Defensive assistant; Chicago Bears (2025–present) Assistant special teams coach

Awards and highlights
- UFL champion (2024)

Anthony Blevins (born July 23, 1976) is an American former professional football player and assistant special teams coordinator of the Chicago Bears of the National Football League (NFL). Blevins played in the original XFL with the Birmingham Thunderbolts and had been a full-time coach in the NFL from 2013 to 2022.

== Education ==
In addition Blevins has a vast array of college degrees from his bachelor's in Sociology, master's degree in Instructional Technology from UAB where he played defensive back, as well as his doctorate in Instructional Systems and Work Force Development from Mississippi State, which he received while serving as a graduate assistant there.

== Playing career ==
After playing college football at UAB, Blevins played professionally for the Mobile Admirals of the Regional Football League, the Birmingham Steeldogs of af2 and the Birmingham Thunderbolts of the original XFL.

== Coaching career ==
=== College coaching career ===
Blevins began his career in coaching at Meadowcreek High School in Georgia. He spent two years there working as the team's secondary coach while also serving as a community liaison. From 2005–2007, he served as a graduate assistant at Mississippi State University. In 2008 he coached at the University of Tennessee-Martin working with the team's cornerbacks while also serving as recruiting coordinator. Between 2009 and 2011, Blevins worked at Tennessee State coaching the special teams and cornerbacks. In 2012, Blevins returned to his alma mater as the Blazers' cornerbacks coach.

=== Arizona Cardinals ===
From 2013 to 2017, Blevins worked under Bruce Arians as an assistant special teams coach for the Arizona Cardinals.

=== New York Giants ===
In 2018, Blevins became a part of Pat Shurmur's staff, where he spent two seasons as the Giants' assistant special teams coach directly under Thomas McGaughey. In 2020 he was retained by Joe Judge who he coached with at Mississippi State and became the team's assistant secondary coach. In 2021 he was named the team's assistant linebackers coach and special teams assistant. He was retained by Brian Daboll and moved to the team's assistant special teams coach.

=== Vegas Vipers ===
On July 7, 2023, Blevins was announced as the new head coach of the Vegas Vipers of the XFL, replacing Hall of Famer Rod Woodson who finished the previous season 2–8. Blevins never coached for the Vipers, who cancelled their stadium lease on August 31 and were formally contracted when the XFL merged into the United Football League prior to the start of the 2024 season.

=== Birmingham Stallions ===
On May 28, 2024, Blevins joined the Birmingham Stallions of the United Football League (UFL) as a defensive assistant.

=== Chicago Bears ===
On February 19, 2025, the Chicago Bears hired Blevins to serve as their assistant special teams coach.
