= Birmingham Thunderbolts =

American football team

Logo

General information
- Founded: 2001
- Folded: 2001; 25 years ago
- Stadium: Legion Field
- Headquartered: Birmingham, Alabama
- Colors: Purple, yellow, silver

Personnel
- Owner: World Wrestling Federation
- General manager: Tim Berryman
- Head coach: Gerry DiNardo

Nickname
- Bolts

League / conference affiliations
- XFL; Eastern Division

The Birmingham Thunderbolts were a short-lived springtime American football team based in Birmingham, Alabama. This team was part of the failed XFL begun by Vince McMahon of World Wrestling Entertainment and by NBC, a major television network in the United States.

== History ==
The Thunderbolts played in the Eastern Division, with the Chicago Enforcers, Orlando Rage and the New York/New Jersey Hitmen. They finished the only year of XFL play – 2001 – in last place with the worst record in the league, at 2-8.

The Thunderbolts played their home games at Birmingham's legendary Legion Field. They were coached by Brooklyn-native Gerry DiNardo, a former star player at the University of Notre Dame, and previously head coach at Vanderbilt University and Louisiana State University. Following the collapse of the XFL, he went on to coach at Indiana University. One of DiNardo's assistants with the Thunderbolts was his predecessor at LSU, Curley Hallman, who was Brett Favre's head coach for three seasons at the University of Southern Mississippi. Hallman also coached at Legion Field with the Alabama Crimson Tide during two stints as an assistant under Bear Bryant, Gene Stallings and Mike DuBose.

The team's colors were purple, yellow, and white. Their logo was a stylized 'B' with six lightning bolts extending from it. On the teams helmets, the logo was placed at the front, instead of the customary position on each side, with only the upper three lightning bolts visible. The team was frequently referred to by fans and the media as simply the Bolts. Team merchandise almost always used the shortened Bolts moniker.

The league originally planned to name the team the Blast, which was the most popular of over 96 names presented to local males aged 12 to 24 (the XFL's target audience) and was approved by local focus groups. However, the name was deemed to be in poor taste among older demographics because "Birmingham Blast" invoked images of the 1963 bombing of the 16th Street Baptist Church and of Eric Rudolph's 1998 bombing of a local abortion clinic, two tragic events in Birmingham history. It was eventually changed to "Thunderbolts," or "Bolts" for short, which the XFL had already copyrighted. The team's logo is said to be the same one originally designed for the Blast.

While XFL players were encouraged to use nicknames instead of their last names on the backs of their jerseys, DiNardo, who earned a reputation as a strict disciplinarian during his college coaching stops, banned Thunderbolts players from doing so.

After losing the opening game to the Memphis Maniax, the Thunderbolts posted wins over the Chicago Enforcers and the New York/New Jersey Hitmen. These would ultimately become the only victories the Thunderbolts would ever see. The Bolts would finish with a 2–8 record.

Birmingham went through all 3 quarterbacks during the season. Former Florida State quarterback Casey Weldon was signed as the starter. Former University of Alabama quarterback Jay Barker was signed as the backup, despite the crowds (averaging only 17,000 fans a game, second-lowest in the league) chanting his name during the home games. Barker (who became much more famous when he married country singing star Sara Evans in 2007) would become the starter after Weldon injured his shoulder. Barker suffered a concussion in Chicago when he collided with Enforcers' cornerback Ray Austin while attempting a bootleg run on a broken play. He was replaced by third string QB Graham Leigh.

NBC dropped the XFL after the first (2001) season due to dismal ratings, and the league was disbanded shortly thereafter.

== Season-by-season ==
Season records
Season	W	L	T	Finish	Playoff results
2001	2	8	0	4th Eastern	Out of playoffs

=== Schedule ===
==== Regular season ====
Week	Date	Opponent	Result	Record	Venue	Attendance
1	February 4	Memphis Maniax	L 20–22	0–1	Legion Field	35,321
2	February 11	at New York/New Jersey Hitmen	W 19–12	1–1	Giants Stadium	36,458
3	February 18	Chicago Enforcers	W 14–3	2–1	Legion Field	17,582
4	February 24	at Orlando Rage	L 6–30	2–2	Florida Citrus Bowl	21,947
5	March 3	at San Francisco Demons	L 10–39	2–3	Pacific Bell Park	33,403
6	March 11	Los Angeles Xtreme	L 26–35	2–4	Legion Field	11,197
7	March 17	at Las Vegas Outlaws	L 12–34	2–5	Sam Boyd Stadium	23,538
8	March 25	at Chicago Enforcers	L 0–13	2–6	Soldier Field	10,593
9	March 31	Orlando Rage	L 24–29	2–7	Legion Field	10,163
10	April 8	New York/New Jersey Hitmen	L 0–22	2–8	Legion Field	10,749

== Personnel ==
=== Staff ===
2001 Birmingham Thunderbolts staff
Front office: Vice president/general manager – Tim Berryman; Director of player personnel – Bob Gates; Head coaches: Head coach – Gerry DiNardo; Offensive coaches: Offensive coordinator/quarterbacks – Dave Arslanian; Running backs – Lionel James; Wide receivers – Mark Brady; Offensive line – Rick Rhoades	Defensive coaches: Co-Defensive Coordinator/Defensive Backs – Curley Hallman; Co-Defensive Coordinator/Defensive Line – Don Wnek; Linebackers – Paul Arslanian; Personal Coach John Guimond; Defensive assistant – Woodrow Lowe, Jr.

=== Roster ===
2001 Birmingham Thunderbolts roster
Quarterbacks (QB): 7 Jay Barker; 13 Graham Leigh; Running backs (RB): 32 Curtis Alexander; 33 James Bostic; 24 Eric Hickson; Wide receivers (WR): 83 Joe Douglass; 85 Kevin Drake; 82 Quincy Jackson; 81 Kaipo McGuire; 80 Stepfret Williams; Tight ends (TE): 83 Reggie Johnson; 86 Ed Smith; 87 Scott Thompson	Offensive linemen (OL): 66 Dan Collins T; 77 Mike Edwards T; 63 Antonio Fleming G; 66 Matt Hogg G; 71 Michael Lies G; 78 Ozell Powell T; 65 Ryan Thomassie C; Defensive linemen (DL): 90 Jarett Loggins DT; 98 Cedric Pittman DE; 58 Charles Preston DE; 95 Quinton Reese DE	Linebackers (LB): 57 Dion Foxx; 18 Keith Franklin; 56 Malcolm X. Hamilton; 50 James Willis; Defensive backs (DB): 31 Duane Butler S; 23 Sedrick Curry CB; 38 Calvin Jackson S; 25 Toya Jones DB; 27 Chris Shelling DB; 37 Eric Sloan CB; Special teams (ST): 5 Brad Palazzo K/P	Practice squad: 96 James Brumbaugh DT; 73 Tim Conley T; 79 Ed King OL; 44 Fred Perry LB; 84 Steve Smith LB; Reserve: 11 Casey Weldon QB (IR); Rookies in italics, 5 practice squad

== Standings ==
Eastern Division
Team	W	L	T	PCT	PF	PA	STK
Orlando Rage	8	2	0	.800	207	162	L1
Chicago Enforcers	5	5	0	.500	163	178	W1
New York/New Jersey Hitmen	4	6	0	.400	110	145	W1
Birmingham Thunderbolts	2	8	0	.200	131	217	L7

== Birmingham Thunderbolts players ==
- 80 Stepfret (Step) Williams WR college (LA-Monroe) played three seasons in the NFL seeing time with the Dallas Cowboys and the Cincinnati Bengals before joining the XFL
- 33 James Bostic RB college (Auburn)
- 71 Mike Edwards Offensive Guard (Nevada). Edwards also played for the Atlanta Falcons and the Washington Football team, before playing in the XFL.
- 81 Kaipo Mc Guire WR college (Brigham Young University) Mc Guire played in NFL Europe in the summer of 1999 with the Barcelona Dragons before splitting the 2000 season playing for the NFL's Indianapolis Colts and the CFL's Montreal Alouettes
- 89 Damon Gourdine WR college (San Diego State), son of singer Little Anthony of Little Anthony and the Imperials; played for the San Diego Chargers in 2000 before joining the XFL
- 32 Curtis "Cool Curt" Alexander RB college (Alabama) Alexander was on the Denver Broncos practice squad for the 1999 season before joining the Miami Dolphins for the 2000 season. Alexander joined the Buffalo Bills after the XFL folded; despite leading the team in rushing yards during the preseason, Alexander was a roster cut.
- 82 Quincy Jackson WR college (Alabama) Jackson played in the Arena Football League in 2000 with the Albany Firebirds before joining the XFL

== Post-XFL developments ==
After the league folded, head coach Gerry DiNardo joined the staff of Birmingham sports talk radio station WJOX 690, as did Jay Barker, who also did sports commentary on local CBS TV affiliate WIAT channel 42. Barker currently hosts "The Opening Drive" on WJOX 94.5 in Birmingham with Tony Kurre and former NFL kicker Al Del Greco.

DiNardo returned to his college football coaching roots in 2002 as the head coach of the Indiana Hoosiers football team. The team was sometimes jokingly nicknamed "The Fighting DiNardos" in his honor. He was fired at the end of the 2004 season. He is currently a studio analyst for the Big Ten Network.

The Thunderbolts were the last playing stop for defensive back Anthony Blevins, after the team folded, Blevins went into coaching at first the high school, then college and NFL levels. In 2023, Blevins was named the head coach of the Vegas Vipers of the re-established XFL becoming one of the only links between the new XFL and the original one.

== Team leaders ==
Legend
Led the league

=== Passing ===
Passing statistics
NAME	GP	GS	Record	Cmp	Att	Pct	Yds	TD	Int	Rtg
Casey Weldon	6	6	2–4	102	164	62.2	1,228	7	5	86.6
Graham Leigh	3	2	0–2	44	97	45.4	499	1	6	39.0
Jay Barker	3	2	0–2	37	65	56.9	425	1	5	49.8
Joe Douglass	—	—	—	1	1	100.0	22	1	0	158.3
Totals	10	10	2–8	184	327	56.3	2,174	10	16	66.5

=== Rushing ===
Rushing statistics
NAME	Att	Yds	Avg	Lng	TD
James Bostic	153	536	3.5	56	2
Casey Weldon	20	30	1.5	16	0
Curtis Alexander	18	81	4.5	19	0
Jay Barker	5	26	5.2	17	0
Graham Leigh	2	14	7.0	12	0
Steve Smith	1	13	13.0	13	0
Joe Douglass	1	-5	-5.0	-5	0
Totals	200	695	3.5	56	2

=== Receiving ===
Receiving statistics
NAME	Rec	Yds	Avg	Lng	TD
Stepfret Williams	51	828	16.2	92t	2
Quincy Jackson	45	531	11.8	36t	6
Ed Smith	25	195	7.8	16	1
Kaipo McGuire	23	181	7.9	23	0
James Bostic	12	172	14.3	50	0
Joe Douglass	10	114	11.4	27	0
Steve Smith	8	54	6.8	15	0
Reggie Johnson	3	15	5.0	8	0
Damon Gourdine	2	31	15.5	16	1
Kevin Drake	2	29	14.5	27	0
Curtis Alexander	2	15	7.5	12	0
Nicky Savoie	1	9	9.0	9	0
Totals	184	2,174	11.8	92	10

=== Scoring ===
8-17 (47.1)% on extra point conversion attempts

Total Scoring
NAME	Rush	Rec	Return	XPM	FGM	PTS
Quincy Jackson	0	6	0	0	0	36
Brad Palazzo	0	0	0	0	7	21
Stepfret Williams	0	2	1	2	0	20
James Bostic	2	0	0	1	0	13
Eric Sloan	0	0	2	0	0	12
Ed Smith	0	1	0	2	0	8
Duane Butler	0	0	1	0	0	6
Keith Franklin	0	0	1	0	0	6
Damon Gourdine	0	1	0	0	0	6
Curtis Alexander	0	0	0	1	0	1
Kaipo McGuire	0	0	0	1	0	1
Steve Smith	0	0	0	1	0	1
Totals	2	10	5	8	7	131
