= Kaipo McGuire =

American football player (born 1974)

No. 10, 11, 81
- Position: Wide receiver

Personal information
- Born: January 16, 1974 (age 52); Honolulu, Hawaii, U.S.
- Listed height: 5 ft 11 in (1.80 m)
- Listed weight: 185 lb (84 kg)

Career information
- High school: Saint Louis (Honolulu)
- College: BYU
- NFL draft: 1997: undrafted

Career history
- Indianapolis Colts (1997–1998); Barcelona Dragons (1999); Birmingham Thunderbolts (2001)

Career NFL Europe statistics
- Receptions: 15
- Receiving yards: 215
- Touchdowns: 0
- Kickoff / Punt returns: 13 / 5
- Kickoff / Punt return yards: 219 / 48
- Touchdowns: 0 / 0
- Stats at Pro Football Reference

Roy Kaiponohea McGuire (born January 16, 1974) is an American former professional football player who was a wide receiver for the Indianapolis Colts of the National Football League (NFL). He played college football for the BYU Cougars . He was signed by the Colts as an undrafted free agent.

== Early life ==
McGuire attended Saint Louis School where he was a four-time letterman, two-time First-team All-state selection, and two-time Receiver of the Year. He also helped Saint Louis win three Oahu Prep Bowls.

He then attended Brigham Young University, where he majored in psychology. As a true freshman in 1992, he redshirt. In 1993 as a redshirt freshman, he appeared in one game and recorded one reception for 12 yards. As a redshirt sophomore in 1994, he appeared in 12 games. He recorded 15 receptions for 201 yards and one touchdown. In 1995 as a redshirt junior, he appeared in 11 games. He recorded 24 receptions for 359 yards and three touchdowns. As a redshirt senior in 1996, he appeared in 14 games. He recorded 42 receptions for 658 yards and five touchdowns.

=== Career statistics ===
Season			Receiving					Rushing				
Year	Team	GP	Rec	Yds	Avg	Lng.	TD	Att	Yds	Avg	Lng.	TD
1992	BYU	--	--	--	--.-	--	--	-	--	--.-	--	--
1993	BYU	1	1	12	12.0	12	0	0	0	0.0	0	0
1994	BYU	12	15	201	13.4	--	1	1	21	21.0	21	0
1995	BYU	11	24	359	15.0	--	3	0	0	0.0	0	0
1996	BYU	14	42	658	15.7	--	5	0	0	0.0	0	0
Career		38	82	1,230	15.0	--	9	1	21	21.0	21	0

== Professional career ==
=== National Football League ===
After going unselected in the 1997 NFL draft, McGuire signed with the Indianapolis Colts in May 1997. As a rookie he appeared in three games. On August 26, 1998, he was waived by the Colts. On September 1, he was signed to the Colts' practice squad. Seven days later, he was released from the practice squad. On September 16, he was re-signed to the practice squad. On December 26, he was promoted to the Colts' active roster. For the season he appeared in one game. He returned two punts for four yards and four kickoffs for 75 yards. On September 5, 1999, during final cuts, he was waived by the Colts.

In 1999, McGuire joined the Barcelona Dragons of NFL Europe. He played, as a starter despite having a hamstring injury. For the season, he recorded 15 receptions for 215 yards with a long of 33. He also recorded four kickoff returns for 64 yards with a long of 23. In 2001, he joined the Birmingham Thunderbolts of the short-lived XFL. For the season, he recorded 23 receptions for 181 (7.9 avg.). He also returned one kickoff for five yards.
