= Calvin Nicholas =

American football player (born 1964)

No. 88
- Position: Wide receiver

Personal information
- Born: June 11, 1964 (age 62); Baton Rouge, Louisiana, U.S.
- Listed height: 6 ft 4 in (1.93 m)
- Listed weight: 208 lb (94 kg)

Career information
- High school: McKinley (Baton Rouge)
- College: Grambling State (1982–1986)
- NFL draft: 1987: 11th round, 301st overall pick

Career history
- San Francisco 49ers (1987–1988); Green Bay Packers (1989)*
- * Offseason or practice squad member only

Career NFL statistics
- Receptions: 1
- Receiving yards: 14
- Stats at Pro Football Reference

Calvin Lewis Nicholas (born June 11, 1964) is an American former professional football player who was a wide receiver for the San Francisco 49ers of the National Football League (NFL). He was selected by the 49ers in the eleventh round of the 1987 NFL draft after playing college football at Grambling State University.

== Early life and college ==
Calvin Lewis Nicholas was born on June 11, 1964, in Baton Rouge, Louisiana. He attended McKinley Senior High School in Baton Rouge.

He played college football for the Grambling State Tigers of Grambling State University from 1982 to 1986. He was medically redshirted in 1985.

== Professional career ==
Nicholas was selected by the San Francisco 49ers in the 11th round, with the 301st overall pick, of the 1987 NFL draft. He officially signed with the team on July 22. He was placed on injured reserve on August 31, 1987, and spent the entire season there. Nicholas played in seven games for the 49ers during the 1988 season, catching one pass for 14 yards, before being released on November 22, 1988.

Nicholas signed with the Green Bay Packers on May 31, 1989. He was released on July 29, 1989.

== Personal life ==
Nicholas has served as a principal at several high schools. In 2015, he was fired as the principal of Scotlandville Magnet High School in Baton Rouge after using a stick to break up a fight. A court reversed the firing in 2017 but by that time Nicholas had already started a new job as the principal at East Iberville Elementary and High School.

His son Calvin Spears was also a football player.
