= Atnaf Harris =

American football player (born 1979)

No. 5, 81
- Position: Wide receiver

Personal information
- Born: February 27, 1979 (age 47); Fresno, California, U.S.
- Listed height: 6 ft 1 in (1.85 m)
- Listed weight: 180 lb (82 kg)

Career information
- High school: Edison (Fresno)
- College: Fresno State; Cal State Northridge
- NFL draft: 2002: undrafted

Career history
- Houston Texans (2002–2003); Denver Broncos (2003–2004)*; San Jose SaberCats (2006)*; Arizona Rattlers (2007–2008)
- * Offseason or practice squad member only

Career NFL statistics
- Receptions: 1
- Receiving yards: 8
- Touchdowns: 0
- Stats at Pro Football Reference

Career AFL statistics
- Receptions: 47
- Receiving yards: 716
- Touchdowns: 11
- Tackles: 2
- Stats at ArenaFan.com

Atnaf DeShawn Harris (born February 27, 1979) is an American former professional football player who was a wide receiver in the National Football League (NFL). He played college football for the Fresno State Bulldogs and Cal State Northridge Matadors.

In his career, Harris played in the NFL for the Houston Texans, Denver Broncos, and with the San Jose SaberCats, and Arizona Rattlers of the Arena Football League (AFL).

== Early life ==
Harris attended Edison High School where he recorded 34 receptions for 667 yards and six touchdowns as a senior. He earned First-team All-North Yosemite League honors and named to the Fresno Bee's All-Star team.

== College career ==
Harris played three seasons at Fresno State, where he recorded 26 receptions for 285 yards and four touchdowns in 23 games. He recorded 17 receptions 198 yards and three touchdowns as a freshman. He was a teammate of Rodney Wright, future San Jose SaberCats teammate, for three seasons. He transferred to Cal State-Northridge for his senior season but the school dropped their football program that year. He then went back to Fresno State where he graduated with a degree in Sociology.

== Professional career ==
=== NFL draft ===
Harris was not expected to get drafted in the NFL, which he was not. However, he did get attention from some pro scouts that were at the Fresno State pro day to watch quarterback David Carr, who was chosen first overall by the expansion Houston Texans, by running a 4.42 40-yard dash and a vertical jump of 43.5".

=== National Football League (2002–2004) ===
After going undrafted in the 2002 NFL draft, Harris was signed by the Houston Texans, who had drafted his college teammate Carr, on May 22. He spent time on the teams practice squad before being signed to the active roster in November. He played in one regular season game as a rookie, a start in the regular season finale, in which he recorded one receptions for eight yards. After was waived by the Texans in the final cuts before the 2003 season, and was signed by the Denver Broncos in December 2003. He then spent the season on the Broncos practice squad, but was waived on August 21, 2004.

=== Arena Football League (2006–2008) ===
==== San Jose SaberCats (2006) ====
Harris signed to the practice squad of the San Jose SaberCats of the Arena Football League on November 3, 2005, and did not play in any games that season.

==== Arizona Rattlers (2007–2008) ====
He then signed with the Arizona Rattlers after spending the 2006 season on the San Jose practice squad.

As a rookie in 2007, Harris played in eight games, starting three, and finished third on the team with 41 receptions and 595 yards and nine touchdowns. His 14.5 yards-per-catch average was first on the team, and was 11th on the Rattlers all-time single season list.

In 2008, Harris played in just two games, both against his former team, the SaberCats. He recorded six receptions for 111 yards and two touchdowns. He also had two tackles. He was released by the Rattlers after the season.

== Personal life ==
Harris enjoys playing video games in his free time, his favorite being Madden NFL. He hopes to pursue a career in coaching high school football. Harris is married and has two sons: Jalen and Kamar.

== See also ==
- List of Arena Football League and National Football League players
