= Bo Kelly =

American football player (born 1972)

No. 2
- Positions: Fullback, linebacker

Personal information
- Born: June 27, 1972 (age 54); Overton, Texas, U.S.
- Listed height: 6 ft 2 in (1.88 m)
- Listed weight: 235 lb (107 kg)

Career information
- High school: West Rusk (New London, Texas)
- College: East Texas State
- NFL draft: 1995: undrafted

Career history
- Arizona Rattlers (1996–1999); Carolina Cobras (2000); Arizona Rattlers (2001–2007)

Awards and highlights
- ArenaBowl champion (1997)

Career AFL statistics
- Rushing attempts: 541
- Rushing yards: 1,617
- Rushing TDs: 88
- Tackles: 541
- Sacks: 3.5
- Stats at ArenaFan.com

Michael 'Bo' Kelly (born June 27, 1972) is an American former professional football player who was a fullback and linebacker in the Arena Football League (AFL) for twelve seasons during the 1990s and 2000s. Kelly played college football for East Texas State University. He played professionally for the Arizona Rattlers and Carolina Cobras of the AFL.

During his long professional career, he became the AFL's all-time rushing leader, breaking the record formerly held by Bob McMillen, (later broken by Derrick Ross in 2013) and played for one ArenaBowl-winning Arizona Rattler team.

== Early life ==
Born in Overton, Texas, Kelly earned all-district honors at running back four times while starting both ways for West Rusk High School as well as lettering in basketball, track, and baseball.

== College career ==
Kelly played at Cisco Junior College where he earned second-team All-Conference honors. After graduation from Cisco, Kelly became a second-team All-Conference selection in his senior season at East Texas State University, Kelly was second on the team in rushing, third in receiving, and second in scoring with six touchdowns as a fullback. Kelly earned Snow Bowl Most Valuable Player honors in 1994.
