= Curtis Fagan =

American football player (born 1979)

Curtis Fagan (born September 1, 1979) is a former American football wide receiver in the Arena Football League (AFL) who played for the New York Dragons and Arizona Rattlers. He played college football for the Oklahoma Sooners.
