= Vince Amey =

American football player and coach (born 1975)

Arizona State Sun Devils
- Title: Assistant defensive line coach

Personal information
- Born: February 9, 1975 (age 51); Los Angeles, California
- Listed height: 6 ft 2 in (1.88 m)
- Listed weight: 289 lb (131 kg)

Career information
- High school: Union City (CA) James Logan
- College: Arizona State
- NFL draft: 1998: 7th round, 230th overall pick

Career history

Playing
- Oakland Raiders (1998); Frankfurt Galaxy (1999); Barcelona Dragons (2000); St. Louis Rams (2000)*; Las Vegas Outlaws (2001); Los Angeles Avengers (2001–2003); Arizona Rattlers (2004–2007)
- * Offseason or practice squad member only

Coaching
- Chaparral HS (2011) Defensive line coach; Arizona (2012–2014) Strength and conditioning; Arizona (2015) Defensive analyst; Arizona (2016–2017) Defensive line coach; Marana HS (2018) Defensive coordinator; San Diego Fleet (2019) Defensive line coach; Los Angeles Wildcats (2020) Defensive line coach; Arizona State (2023) Defensive line coach; Arizona State (2024-2025) Analyst; Arizona State (2026-present) Assistant defensive line coach

Awards and highlights
- World Bowl champion (1999)

Career AFL statistics
- Total tackles: 68
- Sacks: 4.5
- FF / FR: 1 / 3
- receptions: 6
- Receiving yards: 46
- Touchdowns: 1
- Stats at Pro Football Reference
- Stats at ArenaFan.com

Vincent Wayne Amey (born January 9, 1975) is an American football coach and former defensive end, who is currently the assistant defensive line coach at Arizona State. He played college football at Arizona State. He was drafted by the Oakland Raiders in the seventh round (230th overall) of the 1998 NFL draft. He then played for the Las Vegas Outlaws of the short-lived XFL. In 2019, he was the defensive line coach for the San Diego Fleet of the Alliance of American Football (AAF) before joining the Los Angeles Wildcats of the revived XFL the following year.

== Early life ==
Amey attended James Logan High School in Union City, California. While at Logan, he was a three-year letterman in football as a defensive tackle. He was an All-state selection as a senior. He was named one of the "Top 20 Prospects" in the East Bay area. He also lettered in track and basketball.

== College career ==
Amey attended Arizona State University where he was a four-year letterman for the Sun Devils. As a freshman in 1994 he was one of nine true freshman to appear in a game. He appeared in eight games, recording six tackles. In 1995 as a sophomore, he appeared in 10 games, starting at both left and right defensive tackle. As a junior in 1996, he recorded 20 tackles, one sack, two passes defended and one interception, returned for a touchdown. In 1997, he started 11 games at right defensive end. He recorded 26 tackles, one sack, and one pass broken up.

== Professional career ==
Amey was drafted by the Oakland Raiders in the seventh round (230th overall) of the 1998 NFL draft. He was released on August 30, during final cuts. However, he was re-signed on November 13, 1998. While with the Raiders, he appeared in four games, starting one. He spent the spring playing for the Frankfurt Galaxy in NFL Europe, where he won World Bowl '99. He was again cut during final cuts for the 1999 season. He was signed by the St. Louis Rams on July 24, 2000, and released on August 21, 2000. In 2001, he joined the Las Vegas Outlaws of the XFL.

After the XFL folded, Amey joined the Los Angeles Avengers as an offensive / defensive lineman, of the Arena Football League. In 2001, he recorded one reception for nine yards and three tackles. In 2002, he recorded two receptions for 20 yards, as well as four tackles and one pass break-up. In 2003, he recorded one reception for 12 yards, along with three tackles, one forced fumble and one fumble recovery. In 2004 he recorded eight tackles.

In 2005, Amey signed with the Arizona Rattlers, and recorded one reception for three yards, and one carry for zero yards. He also recorded 13 tackles, one sack, one pass break-up and one fumble recovery. In 2006, he recorded 13 tackles, 1.5 sacks, and three pass break-ups. In 2007, he recorded 24 tackles, two sacks, and one fumble recovery. He also recorded one receptions for two yards and one touchdown.

== Coaching career ==
In 2011, Amey served as the defensive line coach at Chaparral High School in Scottsdale, Arizona. In 2012, he became a strength and conditioning coach at Arizona, in 2015, he became a football analyst for the Wildcats and in 2016, head coach Rich Rodriguez named him the Wildcats defensive line coach.

After working with the San Diego Fleet of the Alliance of American Football in 2019 as defensive line coach, he joined the Los Angeles Wildcats of the XFL in the same position the next year.

On November 30, 2022, Amey was hired by new Arizona State head coach Kenny Dillingham to return to his alma mater as the defensive line coach.
