= Joe Douglass =

American football player (born 1974)

No. 88
- Positions: Wide receiver, linebacker

Personal information
- Born: January 24, 1974 (age 52); Salem, Oregon, U.S.
- Listed height: 5 ft 11 in (1.80 m)
- Listed weight: 190 lb (86 kg)

Career information
- High school: South (Salem)
- College: Montana
- NFL draft: 1997: undrafted

Career history
- New York Jets (1997); Amsterdam Admirals (1997–1999); Orlando Predators (2000); Birmingham Bolts (2001); Chicago Rush (2001–2002); Colorado Crush (2003); Los Angeles Avengers (2004); Las Vegas Gladiators (2005–2007)

Awards and highlights
- ArenaBowl champion (2000)
- Stats at ArenaFan.com

Joe Douglass (born January 21, 1974) is an American former football wide receiver and linebacker who played in the Arena Football League (AFL).

== Early life ==
At South Salem High School, Douglass rushed for 2,177 yards as a senior.

== College career ==
At the University of Montana he was a student of Chris Bernuth, who taught performance enhancement.

== Professional career ==
Douglass re-signed with the Chicago Rush on March 21, 2002.
