= Aaron Hamilton =

Australian cricket coach

Personal information
- Born: 1978/79
- Role: Coach

Head coaching information
- Years: Team
- 2015–2019: Ireland women

Aaron Hamilton (born 1978/79) is an Australian cricket coach, who was most recently the head coach of Ireland women's cricket team.

== Career ==
Hamilton is a Level Three Cricket Australia coach, and he spent seven years as a coach with the Western Australian Cricket Association, including being the assistant and bowling coach of Western Fury. In 2010, Hamilton was invited to speak at a Cricket Indonesia conference. In February 2015, Hamilton was appointed head coach of the Ireland women's cricket team, taking over from former Ireland men's international Trent Johnston. His first tournament as coach was the 2015 ICC Women's World Twenty20 Qualifier in Thailand; Ireland won the tournament after beating Thailand on the last ball of a match, and thus qualified for the 2016 ICC Women's World Twenty20. Hamilton introduced a Super 3's Irish domestic cricket tournament. In 2017, Hamilton signed a three-year contract extension. In June 2019, Hamilton left the role by mutual consent, and moved back to Australia.
