= Marlion Jackson =

American football player (born 1975)

No. 34, 32, 20, 42
- Positions: Running back, Linebacker

Personal information
- Born: October 11, 1975 (age 51); Detroit, Michigan, U.S.
- Listed height: 6 ft 1 in (1.85 m)
- Listed weight: 255 lb (116 kg)

Career information
- High school: Central (Detroit)
- College: Saginaw Valley State
- NFL draft: 2000: undrafted

Career history
- Chicago Bears (2000)*; New York Jets (2000–2001); Frankfurt Galaxy (2002); Denver Broncos (2003)*; Philadelphia Soul (2004–2005); Las Vegas Gladiators (2005–2007); Atlanta Falcons (2005)*; (2006); Carolina Panthers (2007)*; Cleveland Gladiators (2008); Pittsburgh Power (2014)
- * Offseason or practice squad member only

Awards and highlights
- First-team All-Arena (2008); Second-team All-Arena (2006)

Career NFL statistics
- Carries: 1
- Rushing yards: 2
- Touchdowns: 0
- Stats at Pro Football Reference

Career AFL statistics
- Carries: 206
- Rushing yards: 721
- Rushing TDs: 32
- Receiving yards: 898
- Receiving TDs: 17
- Stats at ArenaFan.com

Marlion G. Jackson Jr. (born October 11, 1975) is an American former professional football player who was a running back and linebacker in the National Football League and Arena Football League (AFL). He was born in Detroit, Michigan. He played college football for two seasons with the Saginaw Valley State Cardinals. He played for the Philadelphia Soul in the AFL from 2004 to 2005. In 2005, he signed with the Las Vegas Gladiators. In 2006, Jackson played one game with the NFL's Atlanta Falcons. Jackson returned to the Gladiators in 2008, who had since relocated to Cleveland.

== Pro wrestling career ==
In 2019, Jackson started a career in professional wrestling at Rocky Mountain Pro in Golden, Colorado under the name Marlion Bishop. He debuted against The Mopboy on January 19, 2019. He is a former Rocky Mountain Pro Charged champion (2 times) as well as a former Rocky Mountain Pro Heavyweight Champion, winning the championship from Atiba Obika on October 19, 2019

As of 2023, he continues to wrestle for various independent promotions around Colorado.
