= Sidney Haugabrook =

American gridiron football player (born 1982)

Profile
- Position: Defensive back

Personal information
- Born: March 11, 1982 (age 43); Duluth, Georgia, U.S.
- Height: 5 ft 11 in (1.80 m)
- Weight: 190 lb (86 kg)

Career information
- College: Delaware

Career history
- 2005: Hamilton Tiger-Cats
- 2006: Winnipeg Blue Bombers*
- 2006: Memphis Xplorers
- 2007: Las Vegas Gladiators
- 2008: Columbus Destroyers
- * Offseason and/or practice squad member only

Sidney Haugabrook (born March 11, 1982) is an American former professional football defensive back who played for one season in the Canadian Football League (CFL) for the Hamilton Tiger-Cats and two seasons in the Arena Football League (AFL) for the Las Vegas Gladiators and Columbus Destroyers. He played college football for Delaware.

== Professional career ==
=== Canadian Football League ===
Haugabrook was signed by the Hamilton Tiger-Cats of the Canadian Football League (CFL) as an undrafted free agent on September 4, 2005. He was released from the active roster on October 9, and re-signed to the team's practice roster on October 13. He was promoted to the active roster on October 20 where he remained for the rest of the 2005 season. He was re-signed to a contract on April 24, 2006, but was released on May 10 before the start of the season. He signed with the Winnipeg Blue Bombers on May 21, 2006, but was released during final roster cuts on June 10.

=== Arena Football League ===
Haugabrook signed with the Memphis Xplorers of the af2 on June 22, 2006. After the 2006 season, he signed with the Las Vegas Gladiators of the Arena Football League on October 13, 2006, but was waived during final roster cuts on February 24, 2007. He was subsequently signed to the team's practice squad on February 26. He was promoted to the active roster on March 22, but was waived again on April 5. He was re-signed to the practice squad on April 12, and promoted to the active roster again on April 19. The Gladiators moved to Cleveland, Ohio, on October 16, 2007, after the 2007 season, to become the Cleveland Gladiators, but Haugabrook was waived on October 26, 2007.

Haugabrook was awarded off waivers to the Columbus Destroyers on October 29, 2007. He was waived on April 4, 2008, and re-signed on April 18. He was waived again on May 6, 2008.
