= Calvin Spears =

American football player (born 1980)

No. 19, 38, 11
- Position: Defensive back

Personal information
- Born: August 8, 1980 (age 46); Baton Rouge, Louisiana, U.S.
- Listed height: 6 ft 0 in (1.83 m)
- Listed weight: 195 lb (88 kg)

Career information
- High school: Istrouma (Baton Rouge)
- College: Grambling State (1998–2001)
- NFL draft: 2002: undrafted

Career history
- Cleveland Browns (2002)*; Montreal Alouettes (2002); Frankfurt Galaxy (2003); New York Giants (2003)*; New Orleans VooDoo (2004–2005); Kansas City Brigade (2006); New Orleans VooDoo (2007–2008)
- * Offseason or practice squad member only

Awards and highlights
- World Bowl champion (2003); 2× Black college national champion (2000–2001)
- Stats at ArenaFan.com

Calvin Spears (born August 8, 1980) is an American former football defensive back. He played college football at Grambling State University, where he was a four-time All-Southwestern Athletic Conference (SWAC) selection, a two-time All-American, a two-time Black college football national champion, and a two-time SWAC javelin throwing champion. He was inducted into the Grambling Legends Sports Hall of Fame in 2025. After going undrafted in the 2002 NFL draft, Spears signed with the Cleveland Browns but was released before the start of the season. He then played in the Canadian Football League in 2002 and NFL Europe in 2003, helping the Frankfurt Galaxy win World Bowl XI. After a preseason stint with the New York Giants, Spears played in the Arena Football League (AFL) from 2004 to 2008 until the league folded.

== Early life ==
Calvin Spears was born on August 8, 1980, in Baton Rouge, Louisiana. He played high school football at Istrouma High School in Baton Rouge. He also participated in track and field in high school. Spears was initially recruited by McNeese State University to play college football as a quarterback. However, he decided to play for the Tigers of Grambling State University as a defensive back.

== College career ==
Spears played college football for the Grambling State Tigers from 1998 to 2001. He was a four-time All-Southwestern Athletic Conference (SWAC) selection and a two-time All-American. He started every game of his college career. In the fourth quarter of the 2000 SWAC Championship Game, Spears returned an interception 47 yards for a touchdown to help Grambling State beat Alabama A&M by a score of 14–6. The Tigers were named Black college football national champions in both 2000 and 2001. Spears finished his college career with 188 tackles, 44 pass breakups, 16 interceptions, two forced fumbles, and three fumble recoveries. Melvin Spears, the cousin of Calvin's mother, was Calvin's head coach at Grambling State. Spears was also a two-time SWAC javelin throwing champion in college. He was inducted into the Grambling Legends Sports Hall of Fame in 2025.

== Professional career ==
Spears signed with the Cleveland Browns of the National Football League (NFL) on May 6, 2002, after going unselected in the 2002 NFL draft. He was released on September 1, 2002, before the start of the regular season. Spears was signed by the Montreal Alouettes of the Canadian Football League on September 28, 2002. He dressed in one game for the Alouettes during the 2002 season and posted one special teams tackle.

Spears played in all ten games, starting eight, as a safety for the Frankfurt Galaxy of NFL Europe during the 2003 season, recording 34 defensive tackles, 10 assisted tackles, three interceptions, nine pass breakups, and one forced fumble. The Galaxy finished the year with a 6–4 record and advanced to World Bowl XI, where they defeated the Rhein Fire by a score of 35–16. Spears signed with the New York Giants of the NFL on June 24, 2003. He was later released on August 31, 2003.

Spears was signed by the expansion New Orleans VooDoo of the Arena Football League (AFL) on November 19, 2003. He played both offense and defense during his AFL career as the league played under ironman rules. He was placed on injured reserve on April 5, 2004, and activated on April 24. Overall, Spears played in 11 games during the 2004 season, recording 24 solo tackles, seven assisted tackles, one pass breakup, and 31 receptions for 319 yards and five touchdowns. The VooDoo finished the year with an 11–5 record and had the number two ranked defense in the league, only allowing 45.1 points per game. They lost in the quarterfinals of the playoffs to the Colorado Crush by margin of 47–44. After the season ended, Spears re-signed with New Orleans on July 7, 2004. He played in 15 games in 2005, totaling 25 solo tackles, five assisted tackles, three interceptions, two pass breakups, one forced fumble, 15 catches for 146 yards and two touchdowns, and three rushes for one yard and one touchdown. The VooDoo finished the year with a 9–7 record and missed the playoffs. The VooDoo suspended operations due to Hurricane Katrina.

The VooDoo's players were reassigned to the Kansas City Brigade. Spears was placed on physically unable to perform on January 4, 2006, and was activated several days later on January 8, 2006. He appeared in 14 games during the 2006 season, recording 43 solo tackles, 24 assisted tackles, two interceptions, ten pass breakups, one fumble recovery, and 15 receptions for 152 yards and two touchdowns as the team finished 3–13. In 2006, Spears was interviewed about the Arena Football video game that was released that year. He noted that he did not make $59,000 like the game said he did. He also stated "For this being the first AFL game, there's more work needed to make it better, but it's all right."

Spears signed with the VooDoo again on February 8, 2007. He missed the entire 2007 season due to a ruptured Achilles tendon. Ironman rules were eliminated in 2007, so Spears only played defense in 2008. He was named the Arena Football League Writers Association’s Player of the Week for week 6 of the 2008 season after intercepting a Mark Grieb pass 49 yards for a touchdown and posting eight solo tackles to help the VooDoo beat the defending ArenaBowl champion San Jose SaberCats. The victory put the VooDoo's record at 5–1. Spears was also leading the AFL with six interceptions through the first six games. However, the VooDoo went 3–7 in the last ten games of the season, finishing at 8–8 and missing the postseason. Spears finished the year with 88 solo tackles, 14 assisted tackles, seven interceptions for 58 yards and one touchdown, seven pass breakups, and two forced fumbles. The AFL folded after the 2008 season.

== Personal life ==
Spears is the son of NFL player Calvin Nicholas. Spears also spent time as a defensive backs coach at Grambling State during his pro football career. His son Calvin Spears Jr. committed to play college football for the Navy Midshipmen, beginning in 2025.
