= Rufus Brown =

American arena football player (born 1980)

No. 37
- Positions: Wide receiver, defensive back

Personal information
- Born: July 18, 1980 (age 46); San Antonio, Texas, U.S.

Career information
- College: Florida State
- NFL draft: 2004: undrafted

Career history
- 2004: Washington Redskins
- 2005: Hamburg Sea Devils
- 2005–2006: San Jose SaberCats
- 2007: Las Vegas Gladiators
- 2007: New York Dragons
- 2008–present: Arizona Rattlers

Awards and highlights
- BCS national champion (1999)
- Stats at Pro Football Reference
- Stats at ArenaFan.com

Rufus Brown (born July 18, 1980) is an American former professional football wide receiver/defensive back for the Arizona Rattlers in the Arena Football League (AFL).

Brown graduated from Austin High School in El Paso, Texas. He attended Florida State University, where he played football all four years. After playing on the championship team in 1999, he was a starter for the latter two of those years, graduating in 2002 with a degree in Information management. He signed with the Washington Redskins as an undrafted free agent in 2004. After playing on the team's scout team for most of the season, he made his National Football League debut early in 2005. After that season, he was allocated to the Hamburg Sea Devils, for whom he posted fifteen tackles. In 2005, he signed with the San Jose SaberCats, where he spent the 2005 and 2006 seasons on injured reserve.
