= Joseph Todd =

American football player (born 1979)

No. 9, 19
- Position: Defensive specialist

Personal information
- Born: January 29, 1979 (age 47)
- Listed height: 5 ft 9 in (1.75 m)
- Listed weight: 180 lb (82 kg)

Career information
- College: Mississippi Valley State

Career history
- Grand Rapids Rampage (2001–2002); Philadelphia Soul (2004–2005); Arizona Rattlers (2006–2007)

Awards and highlights
- ArenaBowl champion (2001)
- Stats at ArenaFan.com

Joseph Todd (born January 1, 1979) is an American former professional football defensive specialist who played in the Arena Football League. In the 2006 season, Todd led the Arizona Rattlers in tackles with 53.

Todd attended Mississippi Valley State University, where he was a star in football and track and field.
