= Chris Sanders (quarterback) =

American football player (born 1977)

No. 9, 6, 2, 5
- Position: Quarterback

Personal information
- Born: December 22, 1977 (age 48); Nuremberg, Germany
- Listed height: 6 ft 1 in (1.85 m)
- Listed weight: 215 lb (98 kg)

Career information
- High school: Edward S. Marcus (Flower Mound, Texas, U.S.)
- College: SMU; Chattanooga
- NFL draft: 2001: undrafted

Career history
- Tennessee Titans (2001)*; Atlanta Falcons (2002)*; Frankfurt Galaxy (2002)*; Roanoke Steam (2002); Tennessee Titans (2002)*; Buffalo Destroyers (2003); Orlando Predators (2004)*; Manchester Wolves (2005); Orlando Predators (2005); Kansas City Brigade (2006); Arizona Rattlers (2007)*; Dallas Desperados (2008); Dallas Vigilantes (2010)*
- * Offseason or practice squad member only

Career AFL statistics
- Comp. / Att.: 484 / 781
- Passing yards: 5,281
- TD–INT: 91–24
- Passer rating: 95.03
- Rushing TD: 25
- Stats at ArenaFan.com

Christopher Sanders (born December 22, 1977) is an American former professional football quarterback. He played college football for SMU and Chattanooga. He signed with the Tennessee Titans of the National Football League (NFL) after going undrafted in the 2001 NFL draft. He primarily played arena football.

He had two stints with the Titans and one with the Atlanta Falcons where he was allocated to NFL Europe for the Frankfurt Galaxy. He played in the af2 for the Roanoke Steam and Manchester Wolves. He also played in the Arena Football League (AFL) for the Buffalo Destroyers, Orlando Predators, Kansas City Command, Arizona Rattlers, Dallas Desperadoes, and Dallas Vigilantes.

== Early life ==
Sanders was voted by the Associated Press as the 1995 5A Offensive Player of the Year at Edward S. Marcus High School in Flower Mound, Texas where he threw for 4,284 yards his senior year. Sanders was the starting quarterback for the first successful passing team in Texas High School Football.

== College career ==
=== SMU ===
Sanders played college football for SMU, throwing for 1,728 yards and twelve touchdowns in 21 games, including ten starts.

=== Chattanooga ===
Sanders transferred to Chattanooga. While there, Sanders started 22 games for the Mocs. He set school records for passing yards (7,230), touchdowns (49), completions (584), 200-yard passing games (22), 300-yard passing games (12) and total offense (7,247). Sanders was one of sixteen finalists for the Walter Payton Award recognizing best player in NCAA Division I-AA football his senior season. He led the Southern Conference in all major passing categories as senior, throwing for 3,691 yards while also tying a school record with six touchdown passes against Mississippi Valley State. All 6 Touchdown receptions were to Cos DeMatteo which broke Jerry Rice's single game receiving record for Touchdowns in a game for Division I-AA/FCS. It was also Jerry Rice's alma mater. The two were a record breaking duo at Chattanooga. Sanders also connected with DeMatteo for thirteen completions for 207 yards and three touchdown passes at Louisville, a Division I-A/FBS opponent. Sanders passed 367 yards and three touchdowns in the game. Louisville won the game 58–30, but was a career day for the duo vs a much more supreme Conference USA team. Sanders was an All-American honorable mention as a junior with 3,539 yards and 27 touchdown passes.

== Professional career ==
=== Tennessee Titans ===
Sanders went undrafted in the 2001 NFL draft. He then signed a contract with the Tennessee Titans as a rookie and went 11-of-21 for 151 yards in the preseason before being released.

=== Atlanta Falcons ===
In 2002, Sanders was signed as a free agent by the Atlanta Falcons.

=== Frankfurt Galaxy ===
From the Falcons, Sanders was assigned to Frankfurt Galaxy of NFL Europe but was later waived before the start of the season.

=== Roanoke Steam ===
Sanders signed with the Roanoke Steam of af2 and was named af2 Offensive Player of the Week in his first game, throwing for 211 yards and four touchdowns.

=== Tennessee Titans (second stint) ===
Sanders left the Steam and re-signed with the Titans, spending training camp with the team.

=== Buffalo Destroyers ===
In 2003, Sanders played for the Buffalo Destroyers as a back-up and played in five games with a pair of starts to finish the regular season with 529 yards on 52-of-103 passing with eight touchdowns and three interceptions. He saw his first significant action in Week 9, stepping in during the second half to complete five-of-nine passes for 55 yards against the Detroit Fury. His performance earned him a start at New York in Week 10 where he was 21-of-36 for 213 yards and five touchdowns in a 46–39 upset win. He completed 14-of-25 passes for 134 yards with two touchdowns and three interceptions at the Orlando Predators. Sanders completed 12-of-33 passes for 127 yards and one touchdown at Los Angeles.

=== Orlando Predators ===
In 2004, Sanders signed with the Orlando Predators.

=== Manchester Wolves ===
In 2004, Sanders signed with the Manchester Wolves of af2 where he played in 16 games, passing for 4,184 yards and 66 touchdowns. He set seven team records, while finishing second in the league in passing and also led the team in rushing with 129 yards. Overall, Sanders ranked second in the league in rushing touchdowns with 18 for a total of 84 touchdowns on the season.

=== Orlando Predators (second stint) ===
In 2005, Sanders appeared in six games – starting three – for the Orlando Predators. For the season he was, 68-of-128 for 897 yards and 16 touchdowns with two interceptions and had a 53.1 completion percentage and quarterback rating of 100.3 while also rushing 15 times for 22 yards and three touchdowns. He was promoted to starter after his strong second-half performance in the 72–60 victory against the New York Dragons after Joe Hamilton went down in the first half with a shoulder injury. In that contest, Sanders completed 13-of-17 passes for 130 yards, two touchdowns and two rushing touchdowns. Sanders made contributions in Orlando's 52–49 victory over the Georgia Force as he made his first start for the Predators in place of Hamilton and completed 20-of-34 passes for 236 yards and three touchdowns along with a rushing touchdown. He was 18-of-31 for 262 yards and five touchdowns at the Philadelphia Soul. Sanders was 13-of-37 for 221 yards and five touchdowns and one interception against the Austin Wranglers.

=== Kansas City Brigade ===
In 2006, Sanders became the starting quarterback for the Kansas City Brigade in Week 8 at the Austin Wranglers and started the next seven games. He tied for 14th in the AFL with 115 rushing yards – third among quarterbacks – and second with 13 rushing touchdowns – first among quarterbacks. Sanders set single-season team records for rushing attempts (46), yards (115), touchdowns (13), pass completions (184), completion percentage (66.2%), passing yards (2,018), passing touchdowns (36), quarterback rating (126.1), and total offense (4,538). He tied for second in expansion team history in single-game rushing touchdowns with three against the Georgia Force and fifth in single-season rushing touchdowns (13). Sanders was named Offensive Player of the Week at the Nashville Kats on April 22 and Offensive Player of the Game twice: April 1 against the Georgia Force and April 22 at the Nashville Kats. He completed one-of-two passes for 10 yards in a relief role in the team opener at the Dallas Desperados. Sanders completed three-of-five passes for 32 yards and threw his first touchdown of the season against Philadelphia. In his first start of the season at Austin he threw for 229 yards on 16-of-36 passes with three touchdowns and two interceptions. Sanders threw for a season-high 320 yards on 26-of-42 passes with five touchdowns and two interceptions at New York. Against Georgia he completed 29-of-41 passes for 272 yards with four touchdowns and no interceptions and rushed three times for 16 yards with a career-high and single-game franchise-tying three touchdowns. Sanders threw a season-best seven touchdown tosses against Los Angeles while completing 26-of-32 passes for 265 yards and rushed five times for 11 yards and one touchdown. Against the Colorado Crush he was 24-of-36 for 244 yards with five touchdowns and three interceptions while also adding 10 rushing yards on five attempts with two touchdowns. He notched season-highs in completions (30) and attempts (43) while passing for 282 yards with four touchdowns and one interception and ran nine times for 25 yards and two touchdowns at Nashville. Sanders was six-of-12 for 80 yards with one touchdown and one interception against Orlando.

=== Arizona Rattlers ===
On March 6, 2007, Sanders signed with the Arizona Rattlers.

=== Dallas Desperados ===
On November 2, 2007, Sanders was signed by the Dallas Desperados to serve as the backup quarterback to Clint Dolezel. That season, Sanders completed 50-of-100 passes for 634 yards with 11 touchdowns and six interceptions in seven games with two starts for the Desperados. He made his first appearance of the season in Week 4 against the Gladiators, completing one-of-two passes for seven yards. He threw his first touchdown of the season against Nashville as he hit three-of-five passes for 63 yards while also throwing an interception in relief of Sherdrick Bonner. Sanders competed one-of-four passes for 30 yards and one touchdown in Week 9 at New York. He completed his only pass of the game for a 16-yard touchdown in Week 11 against Austin. Sanders made his first start of the season in Week 15 against Los Angeles for an injured Bonner to complete 22-of-37 passes for 266 yards with four touchdowns and two interceptions while also scoring three rushing touchdowns in the contest. He started his second game of the year at the San Jose SaberCats in Week 16 to complete 22-of-49 passes for 252 yards with four touchdowns and three interceptions.

=== Dallas Vigilantes ===
In 2010, Sanders signed with the Dallas Vigilantes.

== Personal life ==
Sanders is now a part-time co-host on the High School Scoreboard show on 103.3 FM ESPN Radio in Dallas Tx. Home of the Michael Irvin Show, Galloway and Co. and GameNight w/ Choppy and Wally.

Sanders also was the unnamed quarterback used on the Spike TV show "4th and Long."
