= 1994 Arizona Rattlers season =

Indoor football season

- Head coach: Danny White
- Home stadium: America West Arena

Results
- Record: 8–4
- Division place: 2nd American Conference
- Playoffs: Won 1st Round (Rage) 52–24; Won Semi-final (Firebirds) 40–33; Won ArenaBowl VIII (Predators) 36–31

The 1994 Arizona Rattlers season marked the third season for the franchise, and was highlighted by a victory in ArenaBowl VIII.

== Regular season ==
=== Schedule ===
Week	Date	Opponent	Results		Game site
Week	Date	Opponent	Final score	Team record	Game site
1	May 20	at Orlando Predators	L 20–30	0–1	America West Arena
2	May 28	Cleveland Thunderbolts	W 64–40	1–1	America West Arena
3	June 1	at Cleveland Thunderbolts	W 41–33	2–1	Richfield Coliseum
4	June 11	Massachusetts Marauders	W 37–35	3–1	America West Arena
5	June 18	Charlotte Rage	W 59–52	4–1	America West Arena
6	Bye				
7	July 2	at Las Vegas Sting	W 50–7	5–1	MGM Grand Garden Arena
8	July 9	Miami Hooters	W 41–26	6–1	America West Arena
9	July 15	at Miami Hooters	L 52–66	6–2	Miami Arena
10	July 23	at Albany Firebirds	L 33–39	6–3	Knickerbocker Arena
11	July 30	Tampa Bay Storm	W 48–21	7–3	America West Arena
12	August 6	at Orlando Predators	L 21–46	7–4	Orlando Arena
13	August 12	Las Vegas Sting	W 51–46	8–4	America West Arena

=== Standings ===
1994 Arena Football League standings
Team	Overall			Conference			Scoring				
Team	W	L	PCT	W	L	PCT	PF	PA	PF (Avg.)	PA (Avg.)	STK
American Conference
xy-Albany Firebirds	10	2	.833	5	1	.833	642	507	53.5	42.25	W 2
x-Arizona Rattlers	8	4	.667	5	1	.833	525	441	43.75	36.75	W 1
x-Massachusetts Marauders	8	4	.667	6	1	.857	586	504	48.83	42	W 1
x-Las Vegas Sting	5	7	.417	2	5	.286	372	484	31	40.3	L 1
Cleveland Thunderbolts	2	10	.167	1	5	.167	445	548	37.08	45.67	L 2
Milwaukee Mustangs	0	12	.000	0	6	.000	386	609	32.16	50.75	L 12
National Conference
xyz-Orlando Predators	11	1	.917	4	1	.800	579	341	48.25	28.42	L 1
x-Tampa Bay Storm	7	5	.583	4	2	.667	561	564	46.75	47	W 1
x-Charlotte Rage	5	7	.417	2	4	.333	442	503	36.83	42.42	L 1
x-Fort Worth Cavalry	5	7	.417	3	2	.600	556	490	36.66	41.92	W 1
Miami Hooters	5	7	.417	1	5	.167	388	491	32.3	40.92	W 1

z – clinched homefield advantage

y – clinched division title

x – clinched playoff spot

== Playoffs ==
Round	Date	Opponent	Results		Game site
Round	Date	Opponent	Final score	Team record	Game site
1st	August 20	Charlotte Rage	W 52–24	1–0	America West Arena
Semi-finals	August 27	at Albany Firebirds	W 40–33	2–0	Knickerbocker Arena
ArenaBowl VIII	September 2	at Orlando Predators	W 36–31	3–0	Orlando Arena

== Awards ==
Position	Player	Award	All-Arena team
Wide receiver/Defensive back	Cedric Tillman	-	2nd
Offensive/Defensive lineman	Doc Wise	-	2nd
