= 1994 Massachusetts Marauders season =

Arena Football League team season

- Head coach: Don Strock
- Home stadium: Centrum in Worcester

Results
- Record: 8-4
- Conference place: 3rd
- Playoffs: Won Quarterfinals 58-51 vs. Tampa Bay Storm; Lost Semifinals 42-51 Orlando Predators

The 1994 Massachusetts Marauders season was the seventh season for the Maruaders, and the first for the franchise in Massachusetts. They finished 8-4 and were defeated in the semifinals.

== Regular season ==
=== Schedule ===
Week	Date	Opponent	Results		Game site
Week	Date	Opponent	Final score	Team record	Game site
1	Bye				
2	May 26	at Las Vegas Sting	W 31-30	1–0	MGM Grand Garden Arena
3	May 30	at Fort Worth Cavalry	W 38-28	2–0	Tarrant County Convention Center
4	June 11	at Arizona Rattlers	L 35-37	2-1	America West Arena
5	June 17	Orlando Predators	L 44-48	2-2	Centrum in Worcester
6	June 24	at Charlotte Rage	W 55-37	3-2	Charlotte Coliseum
7	June 30	at Cleveland Thunderbolts	W 57-48	4-2	Richfield Coliseum
8	July 8	Las Vegas Sting	W 63-35	5-2	Centrum in Worcester
9	July 16	Milwaukee Mustangs	W 58-51	6-2	Centrum in Worcester
10	July 23	at Tampa Bay Storm	L 50-51	6-3	Thunderdome
11	July 30	Albany Firebirds	W 62-43	7–3	Centrum in Worcester
12	August 5	Charlotte Rage	L 49-56	7-4	Centrum in Worcester
13	August 5	at Milwaukee Mustangs	W 44-40	8-4	Bradley Center

=== Standings ===
1994 Arena Football League standings
Team	Overall			Conference			Scoring				
Team	W	L	PCT	W	L	PCT	PF	PA	PF (Avg.)	PA (Avg.)	STK
American Conference
xy-Albany Firebirds	10	2	.833	5	1	.833	642	507	53.5	42.25	W 2
x-Arizona Rattlers	8	4	.667	5	1	.833	525	441	43.75	36.75	W 1
x-Massachusetts Marauders	8	4	.667	6	1	.857	586	504	48.83	42	W 1
x-Las Vegas Sting	5	7	.417	2	5	.286	372	484	31	40.3	L 1
Cleveland Thunderbolts	2	10	.167	1	5	.167	445	548	37.08	45.67	L 2
Milwaukee Mustangs	0	12	.000	0	6	.000	386	609	32.16	50.75	L 12
National Conference
xyz-Orlando Predators	11	1	.917	4	1	.800	579	341	48.25	28.42	L 1
x-Tampa Bay Storm	7	5	.583	4	2	.667	561	564	46.75	47	W 1
x-Charlotte Rage	5	7	.417	2	4	.333	442	503	36.83	42.42	L 1
x-Fort Worth Cavalry	5	7	.417	3	2	.600	556	490	36.66	41.92	W 1
Miami Hooters	5	7	.417	1	5	.167	388	491	32.3	40.92	W 1

z – clinched homefield advantage

y – clinched division title

x – clinched playoff spot

== Playoffs ==
Round	Date	Opponent	Results		Game site
Round	Date	Opponent	Final score	Team record	Game site
1st	August 20	Tampa Bay Storm	W 58-51	1–0	Centrum in Worcester
Semi-finals	August 26	at Orlando Predators	L 42-51	1-1	Orlando Arena

== Roster ==
1994 Massachusetts Marauders roster
Quarterbacks: -- John Gieselman; 10 Mike Pagel; -- Matt Vogler; Wide Receivers/Defensive Backs: 5 Terrence Barber; -- Grantis Bell; -- Amod Field; 22 Junior Green; -- Fred Gunter; -- Kenneth Harper; 2 Andre Langley; -- Gordie Lockbaum; -- Fred Robertson; -- Niu Sale; -- Elliot Searcy; -- Riley Ware; 44 Tony Scott	Fullbacks/Linebackers: 23 Tony Burse; -- Curtis Eller; 32 David Smith; Offensive/Defensive linemen: -- Chris Conlin; -- Johnny Eaton; -- Flint Fleming; 98 Ralph Jarvis; -- Richard Kane; -- Quinton Knight; 92 Danny Lockett; 74 Fran Papasedero; 62 John Zinser	Wide Receivers/Linebackers: -- Phil Logan; 44 Victor Scott; Kickers: -- Arden Czyzewski	Injury Reserve Exempt List: Currently vacant; Practice Squad: Currently vacant; Rookies in italics Roster updated March 6, 2013; 30 Active, 0 Inactive, 0 PS → More rosters

== Awards ==
Position	Player	Award	All-Arena team
Offensive/Defensive Line	Danny Lockett	none	1st
Defensive Specialist	Riley Ware	none	2nd
Fullback/Linebacker	Tony Burse	none	2nd
Wide Receiver/Linebacker	Niu Sale	none	2nd
Offensive/Defensive Line	Ralph Jarvis	none	2nd
