= 1994 Orlando Predators season =

Arena Football League team season

- Head coach: Perry Moss
- Home stadium: Amway Arena

Results
- Record: 11–1
- Division place: 1st, National
- Playoffs: L ArenaBowl VIII vs. Arizona Rattlers

The 1994 Orlando Predators season was the fourth season for the Orlando Predators. They finished the 1994 season 11–1 and lost in ArenaBowl VIII to the Arizona Rattlers.

== Regular season ==
=== Schedule ===
Week	Date	Opponent	Results		Game site (attendance)
Week	Date	Opponent	Final score	Team record	Game site (attendance)
1	May 20	at Arizona Rattlers	W 38–28	1–0	America West Arena (14,568)
2	May 27	at Milwaukee Mustangs	W 58–24	2–0	Bradley Center (14,087)
3	June 3	Las Vegas Sting	W 38–9	3–0	Amway Arena (13,995)
4	June 10	Miami Hooters	W 53–21	4–0	Amway Arena (13,995)
5	June 17	at Massachusetts Marauders	W 48–44	5–0	Worcester Centrum (7,261)
6	June 25	at Albany Firebirds	W 63–48	6–0	Knickerbocker Arena (13,652)
7	July 1	Tampa Bay Storm	W 61–40	7–0	Amway Arena (14,015)
8	Bye				
9	July 15	Charlotte Rage	W 68–14	8–0	Amway Arena (14,015)
10	July 23	at Miami Hooters	W 42–20	9–0	Miami Arena (13,153)
11	July 29	Cleveland Thunderbolts	W 41–32	10–0	Amway Arena (14,067)
12	August 6	Arizona Rattlers	W 46–21	11–0	Amway Arena (14,015)
13	August 13	at Tampa Bay Storm	L 39–40	11–1	ThunderDome (20,819)

=== Standings ===
1994 Arena Football League standings
Team	Overall			Conference			Scoring				
Team	W	L	PCT	W	L	PCT	PF	PA	PF (Avg.)	PA (Avg.)	STK
American Conference
xy-Albany Firebirds	10	2	.833	5	1	.833	642	507	53.5	42.25	W 2
x-Arizona Rattlers	8	4	.667	5	1	.833	525	441	43.75	36.75	W 1
x-Massachusetts Marauders	8	4	.667	6	1	.857	586	504	48.83	42	W 1
x-Las Vegas Sting	5	7	.417	2	5	.286	372	484	31	40.3	L 1
Cleveland Thunderbolts	2	10	.167	1	5	.167	445	548	37.08	45.67	L 2
Milwaukee Mustangs	0	12	.000	0	6	.000	386	609	32.16	50.75	L 12
National Conference
xyz-Orlando Predators	11	1	.917	4	1	.800	579	341	48.25	28.42	L 1
x-Tampa Bay Storm	7	5	.583	4	2	.667	561	564	46.75	47	W 1
x-Charlotte Rage	5	7	.417	2	4	.333	442	503	36.83	42.42	L 1
x-Fort Worth Cavalry	5	7	.417	3	2	.600	556	490	36.66	41.92	W 1
Miami Hooters	5	7	.417	1	5	.167	388	491	32.3	40.92	W 1

z – clinched homefield advantage • y – clinched division title • x – clinched playoff spot

== Playoffs ==
The Predators were seeded first overall in the AFL playoffs.

Round	Date	Opponent	Results		Game site (attendance)
Round	Date	Opponent	Final score	Playoff record	Game site (attendance)
Quarterfinals	August 19	(8) Fort Worth	W 34–14	1–0	Amway Arena (14,047)
Semifinals	August 26	(4) Massachusetts Marauders	W 51–42	2–0	Amway Arena (14,047)
ArenaBowl VIII	September 2	(3) Arizona Rattlers	L 31–36	2–1	Amway Arena (14,368)

== Awards ==
Position	Player	Award	All-Arena team
Head coach	Perry Moss	Head coach of the Year	-
Quarterback	Ben Bennett	-	1st
Fullback/linebacker	Paul McGowan	-	1st
Wide receiver/defensive back	Barry Wagner	Ironman of the Year	1st
Offensive/defensive lineman	Webbie Burnett	-	1st
Defensive specialist	Durwood Roquemore	-	1st
Kicker	Jorge Cimadevilla	-	1st
Offensive/defensive lineman	Rusty Russell	-	2nd
