= Art Haege =

American football player and coach (1937–2007)

No. 65, 66
- Positions: End, linebacker, punter

Personal information
- Born: September 29, 1937; Canton, Illinois, U.S.
- Died: March 5, 2007 (aged 69); Des Moines, Iowa, U.S.
- Listed height: 6 ft 2 in (1.88 m)
- Listed weight: 248 lb (112 kg)

Career information
- High school: Spaulding (IL)
- College: St. Ambrose
- NFL draft: 1960: undrafted

Career history

Playing
- Boston Patriots (1960–1961)*; Chicago Bulls (1962); Saskatchewan Roughriders (1963)
- * Offseason or practice squad member only

Coaching
- Gordon Tech High School (1962) Freshmen coach; St. Ignace High School (1963–1964) Assistant coach (1963) Head coach (1964); Manistee High School (1965) Head coach; Northern Michigan (1966) Graduate assistant/defensive backs coach; Sheboygan Redwings (1967) Head coach; Two Rivers High School (1967–1968) Head coach; Wisconsin (1969) Offensive line coach; St. Francis High School (1970) Head coach; Virginia High School (1971–1976) Head coach; Hibbing Community College (1979–1980) Head coach; Biwabik High School (1981–1982) Head coach; Assumption High School (1983–1984) Head coach; Vermilion Community College (1985–1987) Offensive coordinator; Drake (1988) Linebackers coach; Heathrow Jets (1988) BAFA National Leagues Head coach; Westmar (1989–1991) Defensive coordinator; Milwaukee Mustangs (1994) Defensive coordinator/defensive line coach/interim head coach; Shreveport Pirates (1994) Line coach (Note: Did not coach in a game.); Iowa Barnstormers (1995–2001) Defensive coordinator/line coach (1995–2000) Head coach (2001); Minnesota Fighting Pike (1996) Head coach; New York Gladiators (2002) Defensive line coach; Sioux City Bandits (2004) Head coach; Arkansas Twisters (2005–2006) Defensive coordinator

Operations
- St. Francis High School (1970) Athletic director; Iowa Barnstormers (1995–2001) Director of player personnel (1995–2000) Director of football operations (2001)

Awards and highlights
- St. Ambrose Hall of Fame (1993)

Career CFL statistics
- Games played: 1

Arthur T. Haege (September 29, 1937 – March 5, 2007) was an American football player and coach. He played college football at St. Ambrose and later had short stints in the American Football League (AFL) with the Boston Patriots, the United Football League (UFL) with the Chicago Bulls, and the Canadian Football League (CFL) with the Saskatchewan Roughriders. During his time in professional football, he began a coaching career. Haege later coached various teams at the high school, college, and professional arena football levels.

== Early life and education ==
Haege was born on September 29, 1937, in Canton, Illinois. One of four children (three sons, one daughter) born to Bob (a former player at Notre Dame, who was dismissed after one season) and Kathleen Haege, he liked football from a young age. He grew up in Peoria, Illinois, and attended Spaulding Institute there, where he was a starter on the baseball and football teams. Haege played college football at St. Ambrose University, in Davenport, Iowa, from 1956 to 1959. He was a four-year letterman and played both offense and defense, as a tight end and defensive end. He also played punter, and was for two years the team's top receiver. As a senior, Haege was named the school's athlete of the year and was selected honorable mention Little All-America. He later became, in 1993, the first person to be inducted into their athletic hall of fame.

While at St. Ambrose, Haege also won a regional Golden Gloves tournament and played a season of semi-professional baseball with the Holland Dutchmen.

== Professional playing career ==
Haege was signed by the Boston Patriots of the American Football League (AFL) in 1960, but left during camp to resume studies at St. Ambrose. He later rejoined the Patriots in 1961, and upon joining for the second time was changed from end to linebacker. After playing in the 1961 preseason with Boston, he was released in late August.

In July 1962, Haege was signed by the Chicago Bulls of the United Football League (UFL). He scored one touchdown on the season, wearing number 66 while playing linebacker and punter. In June 1963, Haege was signed by the Saskatchewan Roughriders of the Canadian Football League (CFL). He was released in mid-August, after having appeared in just one game. They were the final team of his playing career. During his playing days, he weighed 248 pounds (112 kg) and was 6 feet 2 inches (1.88 m) tall.

== Coaching career ==
In October 1961, after being released by the Patriots, Haege received his first coaching job at Gordon Tech High School as freshmen coach. Following the 1962 season, he became a coach at St. Ignace High School, serving as an assistant in 1963, as well as junior varsity coach and basketball coach, before being promoted to head coach in 1964. In his first season as head, he led them to a 6–2 record and the conference championship. It was the first championship in school history.

Haege left for Manistee High School in 1965 as head, and led them to a 5–3 record, their first winning season in five years. The following year, he enrolled at Northern Michigan University (NMU) to work on a master's degree in physical education. He also became graduate assistant and defensive backs coach at the school. In 1967, Haege became coach of both the Sheboygan Redwings (of the Central States Football League) and the football team at Two Rivers High School. He also, according to The Des Moines Register, coached Sheboygan High School in 1967. Haege led the Redwings to a record of 3–7, and brought Two Rivers, which had not won more than two games in a season in the prior decade, to a mark of 7–1–1.

The next year, Haege left the Redwings, but stayed at Two Rivers, and led them to an 8–0 record and the conference championship, which was their first unbeaten, untied season in more than two decades. They were also ranked the third-best "big school" in the state at the end of the season (state playoffs did not yet exist). Haege left to become offensive line coach at the University of Wisconsin–Madison in 1969.

Wisconsin was on a 22 conference game losing streak when Haege joined, and had not won a game in several years. Haege took the entire team to church prior to their game against Iowa on October 11, and when they played, they won 23–17 to end the losing streak. Wisconsin won a total of three games in the 1969 season. Late in the season, he was told his contract would not be renewed. In January 1970, he was told he was offered a new contract; however, when he went to accept it, Haege was told the offer had been pulled. When asked about it, his only comment was "Now I've really learned my lesson!"

In May 1970, Haege accepted a position as head coach and athletic director at St. Francis High School in Traverse City, Michigan. He led them to six wins, two losses, and a tie, including a win over his former team, St. Ignace. They were ranked the 16th-best team in the state in the final rankings. He resigned after one season to become head coach at Virginia High School in Minnesota.

Virginia had won one game in three years prior to Haege's arrival, but went 4–4–1 in his first season. On the day of their first game, at the team's pep rally, he guaranteed a win in front of the entire school. Virginia ended up winning 22–12. The following year, Haege led them to a 6–4 record; they had started 5–0 before an injury to their main quarterback.

In April 1973, the Virginia school board, which Haege had caught the ire of, voted 4–2 to not renew his contract, stating that the reasons for firing him included: "(1) incorrect marking of grades on one occasion; (2) use of language considered not fitting a representative of Virginia High School; and (3) his classroom attendance." The decision was a huge surprise to almost everyone, and caused the town to unite in opposition to the board. Students protested by leaving the school en masse, the school athletic association met and protested, and numerous protest letters were received by the board.

A protest letter sent by one of Haege's athletes said the following: "The year before Haege signed on, Virginia was 1–8 on the varsity level, 0–7–1 on 'B' level and 3–2 on the 'C' team level. They scored 47 points and gave up 171. In Haege's first year, they were 4–4–1, scored 183 points, gave up 139 and in the words of [Mesabi Daily News] sportswriter Mike Gill: 'the Blue Devils aren't a club overladen with outstanding natural talent, just a sound, disciplined, well trained and aggressive unit' ... It's a team you gotta like. A football team is a reflection of its coach. So, Coach Haege is a coach you have to like."

The letter listed some of Haege's accomplishments in the city: "(1) forming up a pony league football program; (2) putting the [Virginia High School] Lettermen's Club back on its feet; (3) starting an early bird fitness program in the city; [and] (4) promoting high school athletes so they get notice and recognition from the college ranks." It also stated that "many of the football players aren't going to put on their pads next fall unless Haege is back. By firing him, you are destroying all the hard work of not only the coach, but his players. It's a grave mistake."

Both sides hired lawyers to negotiate, and eventually the Virginia school board decided they would be willing to rehire him. Haege returned, and in 1973 led Virginia to an 8–1 record, the best in school history. Their only loss was to Eveleth, the eventual state champions. They went 8–1 again in 1974, as Haege was named the conference's coach of the year. Virginia won five games in 1975, and only four in 1976, before Haege was again dismissed by the school board due to an ongoing feud. Students again protested, writing on the city water tower "VHS Needs Haege," although this time he did not return. In the following two years, during which Haege did not coach any team, Virginia won only one game.

Haege was hired by Hibbing Community College as head coach in 1979. They were able to compile a 5–4 record under Haege despite the football team not existing previously. Included among their wins was a 7–3 upset over Mesabi Community College, which had a record of 7–0 by that point. Hibbing's game-winning touchdown catch was scored by a player Haege had coached at Virginia, and afterwards Haege was carried off the field by his players. He remained coach at Hibbing in 1980, before accepting a position at Biwabik High School.

Subsequently Haege led Biwabik to a 5–4 record in his first season, and after his second left for head job at Assumption High School. In 1983, he helped Assumption win six games while losing three, reaching the state playoffs for the first time in a decade. Assumption suffered from a lack of men in 1984, and only won two out of nine games. Haege had to for a time coach all by himself, the freshman team had only 11 players, and the varsity team had just three experienced players for Haege to work with.

Resigning after his second season at Assumption, Art Haege stated that "There are five or six basic things that are needed if a school is to have a sound athletic organization," while strongly implying that the school was in all areas lacking. "You need, first of all, consistent support from the administration. Secondly, you need a strong youth program directly under the high school program, which you don't have here. You need quality, loyal assistants on your staff, you need loyal support from faculty and parents, and you need enough athletes. You also need an organized athletic program."

Haege also stated that he was displeased with the actions of the fans, who he said were only interested in the number of wins the team had: "You've got people who stand up in the bleachers, frothing at the mouth, screaming at the kids and the coaches. I've just never run into anything like that." He additionally said that at Assumption, for the first time during his coaching career, he began receiving attack letters from the fans. Each of these things Haege said contributed to his decision to leave the school.

Accepting a position as offensive coordinator at Vermilion Community College in 1985, Haege served in the position through 1987. It was his 14th career coaching job. In his second season, he helped them win the state championship for the first time in team history. After three seasons at Vermilion, Haege became the linebackers coach at Drake, as well as the head coach of the Heathrow Jets in England, BAFA National Leagues. He served in both the positions for only one season, and in England led his Jets team to an 10–0 record in the 1988 regular season to win the conference title. The Jets then lost in the premier league playoffs quarterfinals 54–34 to the London Capitals.

Haege followed Drake coach Bill Charles to Westmar University in 1989 as defensive coordinator. As Westmar was an National Association of Intercollegiate Athletics (NAIA) program, this meant that Haege had now coached at every collegiate level that exists in football: NCAA Division I at Wisconsin; NCAA Division II at Northern Michigan; NCAA Division III at Drake; NAIA at Westmar; and NJCAA with Hibbing and Vermilion. He was able to recruit two of his players from England to play for Westmar. In 1990, he helped them win nine of ten games and have one of the top ten NAIA rushing defenses. In 1991, he faced off against Peru State coach Lou Saban, who had signed Haege as a player with the Patriots back in 1960–1961 and who Haege described as "my inspiration, my measuring stick when it comes to the coaching profession." He was relieved of his coaching duties following the 1991 season.

Haege joined Saban in 1994 as defensive line coach and defensive coordinator for the Milwaukee Mustangs of the Arena Football League (AFL). During the season, he accepted a position to become a line coach (sources disagree on offensive line versus defensive line) for the Shreveport Pirates of the Canadian Football League (CFL), although he later decided against this and returned with Milwaukee. Following the fourth game of the 1994 Arena Football League season, Haege was named interim head coach. He served as head coach for the final eight games of the season, losing all of them.

After the 1994 season, Haege was announced as the director of player personnel as well as the defensive coordinator and line coach of the newly formed Iowa Barnstormers. He was the first coach to be hired by the franchise, and was the one who had to recruit players for their first season in 1995. Among the players he recruited was Kurt Warner, who, after three seasons with the Barnstormers, went on to have a successful career in the National Football League (NFL) and was inducted into the Pro Football Hall of Fame. Following the 1995 season, Haege accepted a position as the head coach of the new Minnesota Fighting Pike. However, he suffered a serious stroke in November 1995 and ended up resigning in January 1996, before having coached in any games. He resigned partially because of the stroke and because, as he said, "I knew it just wouldn't work out ... I wanted my own full-time assistant coaches, who had played or coached in the league, knew the game. These guys didn't fit my approach. I'm more of a hell-bent, raise-hell kind of guy who is going to go after people. I'm not an intramural junior college guy. I'm going to go after things my way. I didn't want a bunch of weaklings. They had some real nice people as coaches, but I saw they just weren't my kind of folks."

After resigning as coach of the Fighting Pike, Haege returned to the Barnstormers as director of player personnel and defensive coordinator. He helped Iowa reach the ArenaBowl two consecutive years in 1996 and 1997. Haege remained in the position through 2000, before being promoted to head coach at the end of that season. The Barnstormers were demoted to AF2 in 2001, and that placed them in the same league and in a position to play the Quad City Steamwheelers, where Haege's son Frank coached. The two Haeges had also played several times while assistants, with Art going 4–1 in those games. The Barnstormers-Steamwheelers game was scheduled for week three, and by that point in the season, the elder Haege's team was 0–2 while the younger Haege's team was 2–0, and on an active 21-game win streak. Although Art Haege predicted a victory for his team, the Barnstormers ended up losing 45–7, making their record 0–3 to start the season. After the sixth game of the season, by which point the Barnstormers were 2–4, Haege was fired due to the team's poor fan attendance and poor record. He was afterwards invited to remain as director of player personnel, but dismissed the offer, being greatly upset with the firing.

After the 2001 season ended, Haege became the defensive line coach and a Midwest scout for the New Jersey Gladiators, where Frank Haege (who had left the Steamwheelers) was head coach. He spent the 2003 season out of coaching, but prior to the 2004 National Indoor Football League season was named head coach of the Sioux City Bandits. Haege led the team to a 4–4 start, but was fired midseason by general manager Bob Scott, who was disappointed in the team's record. Midseason in 2005, Haege became defensive coordinator of the Arkansas Twisters in AF2. He remained in the position until his death in early 2007.

=== Coaching style ===
Haege was known for his very disciplined style of coaching, while having a sense of humor at the same time. Several newspapers likened him to Green Bay Packers coach Vince Lombardi. In 1968, when asked about his coaching philosophy, Haege said, "We try to teach hitting football – rather, we demand it. We're hard on the kids both mentally and physically. We teach viciousness because that's the way the game was meant to be played ... Our indoctrination is hit, hit, hit. We want each and every kid to be an attacker; we want each one to want to succeed."

Early in his coaching career, Haege often yelled at his players, being called a "terror on the sidelines and in practice," and after each loss, he made his players crawl from the locker room to the practice field, saying "if you played like a worm, you crawled like a worm." Once, when a player asked to quit after being tired of Haege's "drill sergeant" approach to coaching, Haege replied, "That's fine – you can go right now. But first take off your uniform. You don't deserve to wear your school's colors." The player took off his jersey, shoulder pads and T-shirt, but was then told that he could only leave if he took off his socks, shoes and pants as well, leaving the player to run in his underwear a full two city blocks back to the locker room.

Despite his treatment of players, Haege was still well-liked among them and students. A staff writer of the Green Bay Press-Gazette wrote that, "even though he pushed them almost mercilessly, berated them and challenged them, Haege is revered by his former players." One of his former Two Rivers athletes said, "the style of coaching was pretty much of a shock to everybody. We thought we were being worked to death, but psychologically what [Haege] was doing was building us. We started playing as a team and the team camaraderie that was built back then exists today 35 years later."

When asked what kind of person he wanted to coach, Haege stated he preferred the "feisty" kids, saying, "I want a kid with ribbons and stuff hanging all over his Letterman's jacket – I want him to have a little mustache and a toothpick hanging out of his mouth. And I want him to say, 'Coach, I wanna break some bones.'"

Rather than stay at one school, Haege was known for moving from school to school as he enjoyed the challenge of making losing football teams winners. For example, two years after leading Manistee High School to their first winning season in five years in 1965, he became the coach of both the Sheboygan Redwings and Two Rivers High School, the former of which had gone winless the prior year and hadn't gone over .500 in five years, and the latter of which hadn't won more than two games per year in the prior decade. He also resigned following a successful 1970 season at St. Francis High School to became coach at Virginia High School, which had won only a single game in the three previous seasons, and led them within four years to back-to-back 8–1 records.

Haege wished to be known as "the coach who wouldn't be coached." If he was hired to be head coach of a team, he considered it to be "his team"; Haege once kicked out of practice a school board member while asserting "this is my team." "I've always been controversial because I've been outspoken," he once said in an interview with the Manitowoc Herald-Times. "As a football coach, I think I should run the football program; not some school board member." During his time coaching high schools and community colleges, Haege usually had only one or two assistants, and often served in addition to head coach as the offensive, defensive, and special teams coordinator as well as strength and conditioning coach.

His son Frank said that he would "do just about anything to win and proved it just about anywhere he went." Once, when his high school team was scheduled to play the team having the top offense in the state, he left a running water hose on the field all night long the day before the game. The field was soaked, significantly hampering Haege's opponent, and his team won, 6–0.

Haege did not allow discrimination of any type on his teams, once firing an assistant who had been mocking a gay person. He went by the principle, "if you didn't behave like a pro, and play like a pro, coach Haege didn't want you on his team."

== Personal life and death ==
Haege owned the End Zone Bar & Liquor Store in Virginia, Minnesota, for a time in the 1970s. He met his first wife, Carol, at St. Ignace and had two sons with her, including Frank, who also became a football coach. He later remarried to Josie, whom he met while at Drake, and had a further two sons with her, later divorcing.

Haege died on March 5, 2007, at the age of 69, from a rupture within the wall of his aortic artery, while still a professional coach. He had previously stated that he wished to continue coaching until turning 70.

== Head coaching record ==
=== High school ===
Year	Team	Overall	Conference	Standing	Bowl/playoffs
St. Ignace Saints (Straits–Huron Conference) (1964)
1964	St. Ignace	6–2	?–?	1st	
St. Ignace:		6–2	?–?		
Manistee Chippewas (Unknown) (1965)
1965	Manistee	5–3	?–?	?	
Manistee:		5–3	?–?		
Two Rivers Purple Raiders (Mid-Eastern Conference) (1967–1968)
1967	Two Rivers	7–1–1	?–?	?	
1968	Two Rivers	8–0	6–0	1st	
Two Rivers:		15–1–1	?–?		
St. Francis Gladiators (Michigan Huron Shores Conference) (1970)
1970	St. Francis	6–2–1	?–?	3rd	
St. Francis:		6–2–1	?–?		
Virginia Blue Devils (Iron Range Conference) (1971–1976)
1971	Virginia	4–4–1	?–?	?	
1972	Virginia	6–3	?–?	?	
1973	Virginia	8–1	?–?	?	
1974	Virginia	8–1	?–?	?	
1975	Virginia	5–4	?–?	?	
1976	Virginia	4–5	?–?	?	
Virginia:		35–18–1			
Biwabik High School (Unknown) (1981)
1981	Biwabik	5–4	?–?	?	
Biwabik:		5–4	?–?		
Assumption Royals (Central Wisconsin Catholic Conference) (1983–1984)
1983	Assumption	6–3	?–?	?	
1984	Assumption	2–7	?–?	?	
Assumption:		8–10	?–?		
Total:		?–?			
National championship Conference title Conference division title or championship game berth

=== Junior college ===
Year	Team	Overall	Conference	Standing	Bowl/playoffs
Hibbing Cardinals (Unknown) (1979–1980)
1979	Hibbing	5–4	?–?	?	
Hibbing:		5–4	?–?		
Total:		5–4			

=== Europe ===
Team	Year	Regular season				Postseason			
Team	Year	Won	Lost	Win %	Finish	Won	Lost	Win %	Result
Heathrow Jets BAFA National Leagues	1988	11	0	1.000	1st	1	1	.500	– Lost Quarterfinal to London Capitals
Total		11	0	1.000		1	1	.500	

=== Arena ===
Team	Year	Regular season				Postseason			
Team	Year	Won	Lost	Win %	Finish	Won	Lost	Win %	Result
Sheboygan Redwings (CSFL)	1967	3	7	.300	Unknown	0	0	.000	–
Milwaukee Mustangs (AFL)*	1994	0	8	.000	6th in American Conference	0	0	.000	–
Iowa Barnstormers (AF2)§	2001	2	4	.333	3rd in Midwest Division	0	0	.000	–
Sioux City Bandits (NIFL)§	2004	4	4	.500	3rd in Northern Division	0	0	.000	–
Total		9	23	.281		0	0	.000	

* indicates interim head coach position – § indicates Haege did not finish the season as head coach
