= Nudo =

Nudo or NUDO may refer to:

== People ==
- Gene Nudo (born 1958), American American football coach
- Vince Nudo, Canadian musician
- Walter Nudo, Italian actor

== Places ==
- Col Nudo, Italy
- Monte Nudo, Italy
- Nudo, Croatia
- Nudo, Nikšić, Montenegro
- Nudo de los Pastos, Ecuador

== Other ==
- El nudo, Spanish series
- National Unity Democratic Organisation
- Nudo Bombers
- Po Nudo, Star Wars character
