= Calvin Schexnayder =

American football player (born 1969)

No. 3, 8
- Position: Wide receiver

Personal information
- Born: November 29, 1969 (age 56); Fresno, California, U.S.
- Listed height: 6 ft 0 in (1.83 m)
- Listed weight: 190 lb (86 kg)

Career information
- High school: Bullard (Fresno)
- College: Washington State
- NFL draft: 1993: undrafted

Career history
- Arizona Rattlers (1994–2001); San Francisco Demons (2001); Tampa Bay Storm (2002); San Jose SaberCats (2004–2006)

Awards and highlights
- 3× ArenaBowl champion (1994, 1997, 2004); AFL Offensive Player of the Year (1998); 2× First-team All-Arena (1997, 1998); AFL's Second Team 15th Anniversary Team (2001)

Career AFL statistics
- Receptions: 625
- Receiving yards: 8,796
- Tackles: 26
- Kickoff return yards: 1,777
- Total touchdowns: 192
- Stats at ArenaFan.com

Calvin "Shakes" Schexnayder (/ʃeɪksˈniːdər/; born November 11, 1969) is an American former professional football wide receiver who played in the Arena Football League (AFL) with the Arizona Rattlers, Tampa Bay Storm, and San Jose SaberCats. He played college football at Washington State.

== Early life ==
Schexnayder attended Bullard High School in Fresno, California.

== College career ==
=== Fresno City College ===
Upon his graduation in 1988, Schexnayder enrolled at Fresno City College, where he played football for the Rams during the 1988 and 1989 football seasons.

=== Washington State ===
Schexnayder attended Washington State University on a football scholarship, where he played the 1991 and 1992 seasons with the Cougars. During the 1992 Copper Bowl, he had 4 catches for 43-yards in the Cougars' 31-28 win over Utah.

=== Statistics ===
	Receiving				
Season	Team	Rec	Yds	Avg	TD
1988	Fresno	24	438	18.3	3
1989	Fresno	50	916	18.3	8
	Totals	74	1,354	18.3	11
1991	Wash St	19	276	14.5	2
1992	Wash St	24	329	13.7	5
	Totals	43	605	14.1	7
