= 1994 Miami Hooters season =

Arena Football League team season

- Head coach: Jimmy Dunn
- Home stadium: Miami Arena

Results
- Record: 5–7
- Division place: 5th, National
- Playoffs: Did not make playoffs

The 1994 Miami Hooters season was the third season for the Miami Hooters. They finished the 1994 season 5–7 and were the only team in the National League to not make the playoffs.

== Regular season ==
=== Schedule ===
| Week | Date | Opponent | Results | | Game site (attendance) |
| Week | Date | Opponent | Final score | Team record | Game site (attendance) |
|---|---|---|---|---|---|
| 1 | May 21 | at Las Vegas Sting | W 35–22 | 1–0 | MGM Grand Garden Arena (10,109) |
| 2 | May 27 | Charlotte Rage | W 45–23 | 2–0 | Miami Arena (7,600) |
| 3 | June 3 | Albany Firebirds | L 23–42 | 2–1 | Miami Arena (7,100) |
| 4 | June 10 | at Orlando Predators | L 21–53 | 2–2 | Amway Arena (13,995) |
| 5 | June 20 | Milwaukee Mustangs | W 35–27 | 3–2 | Miami Arena (7,414) |
| 6 | June 25 | at Tampa Bay Storm | L 32–47 | 3–3 | ThunderDome (19,031) |
| 7 | Bye | | | | |
| 8 | July 9 | at Arizona Rattlers | L 26–41 | 3–4 | America West Arena (15,505) |
| 9 | July 15 | Arizona Rattlers | W 66–52 | 4–4 | Miami Arena (8,312) |
| 10 | July 23 | Orlando Predators | L 47–37 | 4–5 | Miami Arena (12,478) |
| 11 | July 29 | at Charlotte Rage | L 25–44 | 4–6 | Charlotte Coliseum (10,897) |
| 12 | August 5 | Fort Worth Cavalry | L 27–58 | 4–7 | Miami Arena (8,872) |
| 13 | August 13 | at Cleveland Thunderbolts | W 43–40 | 5–7 | Richfield Coliseum (15,102) |

=== Standings ===
1994 Arena Football League standings
| Team | Overall | | | Conference | | | Scoring | | | | |
| Team | W | L | PCT | W | L | PCT | PF | PA | PF (Avg.) | PA (Avg.) | STK |
|---|---|---|---|---|---|---|---|---|---|---|---|
American Conference
| xy-Albany Firebirds | 10 | 2 | .833 | 5 | 1 | .833 | 642 | 507 | 53.5 | 42.25 | W 2 |
| x-Arizona Rattlers | 8 | 4 | .667 | 5 | 1 | .833 | 525 | 441 | 43.75 | 36.75 | W 1 |
| x-Massachusetts Marauders | 8 | 4 | .667 | 6 | 1 | .857 | 586 | 504 | 48.83 | 42 | W 1 |
| x-Las Vegas Sting | 5 | 7 | .417 | 2 | 5 | .286 | 372 | 484 | 31 | 40.3 | L 1 |
| Cleveland Thunderbolts | 2 | 10 | .167 | 1 | 5 | .167 | 445 | 548 | 37.08 | 45.67 | L 2 |
| Milwaukee Mustangs | 0 | 12 | .000 | 0 | 6 | .000 | 386 | 609 | 32.16 | 50.75 | L 12 |
National Conference
| xyz-Orlando Predators | 11 | 1 | .917 | 4 | 1 | .800 | 579 | 341 | 48.25 | 28.42 | L 1 |
| x-Tampa Bay Storm | 7 | 5 | .583 | 4 | 2 | .667 | 561 | 564 | 46.75 | 47 | W 1 |
| x-Charlotte Rage | 5 | 7 | .417 | 2 | 4 | .333 | 442 | 503 | 36.83 | 42.42 | L 1 |
| x-Fort Worth Cavalry | 5 | 7 | .417 | 3 | 2 | .600 | 556 | 490 | 36.66 | 41.92 | W 1 |
| Miami Hooters | 5 | 7 | .417 | 1 | 5 | .167 | 388 | 491 | 32.3 | 40.92 | W 1 |

z – clinched homefield advantage • y – clinched division title • x – clinched playoff spot

== Awards ==
| Position | Player | Award | All-Arena team |
|---|---|---|---|
| Wide receiver/linebacker | Bruce LaSane | - | 1st |
| Defensive specialist | Donald Brown | - | 2nd |
