= 1994 Charlotte Rage season =

Arena Football League team season

- Head coach: Galen Hall
- Home stadium: Charlotte Coliseum

Results
- Record: 5–7
- Division place: 3rd, National
- Playoffs: L Quarterfinals vs. Arizona Rattlers

The 1994 Charlotte Rage season was the team's third season. Rage finished the season 5–7, losing in the quarterfinals of the AFL playoffs to the Arizona Rattlers.

== Regular season ==
=== Schedule ===
| Week | Date | Opponent | Results | | Game site (attendance) |
| Week | Date | Opponent | Final score | Team record | Game site (attendance) |
|---|---|---|---|---|---|
| 1 | May 21 | at Tampa Bay Storm | W 44–39 | 1–0 | ThunderDome (16,150) |
| 2 | May 27 | at Miami Hooters | L 23–45 | 1–1 | Miami Arena (7,600) |
| 3 | June 4 | Milwaukee Mustangs | W 51–10 | 2–1 | Charlotte Coliseum (11,800) |
| 4 | June 10 | Fort Worth Cavalry | L 30–54 | 2–2 | Charlotte Coliseum (9,631) |
| 5 | June 18 | at Arizona Rattlers | L 52–59 | 2–3 | America West Arena (15,311) |
| 6 | June 24 | Massachusetts Marauders | L 37–55 | 2–4 | Charlotte Coliseum (9,167) |
| 7 | July 4 | at Fort Worth Cavalry | L 20–42 | 2–5 | Tarrant County Convention Center (9,631) |
| 8 | July 8 | Cleveland Thunderbolts | W 43–23 | 3–5 | Charlotte Coliseum (8,898) |
| 9 | July 15 | at Orlando Predators | L 14–68 | 3–6 | Amway Arena (14,015) |
| 10 | Bye | | | | |
| 11 | July 29 | Miami Hooters | W 44–25 | 4–6 | Charlotte Coliseum (10,897) |
| 12 | August 5 | at Massachusetts Marauders | W 56–49 | 5–6 | Worcester Centrum (8,646) |
| 13 | August 12 | Albany Firebirds | L 28–52 | 5–7 | Charlotte Coliseum (9,460) |

=== Standings ===
1994 Arena Football League standings
| Team | Overall | | | Conference | | | Scoring | | | | |
| Team | W | L | PCT | W | L | PCT | PF | PA | PF (Avg.) | PA (Avg.) | STK |
|---|---|---|---|---|---|---|---|---|---|---|---|
American Conference
| xy-Albany Firebirds | 10 | 2 | .833 | 5 | 1 | .833 | 642 | 507 | 53.5 | 42.25 | W 2 |
| x-Arizona Rattlers | 8 | 4 | .667 | 5 | 1 | .833 | 525 | 441 | 43.75 | 36.75 | W 1 |
| x-Massachusetts Marauders | 8 | 4 | .667 | 6 | 1 | .857 | 586 | 504 | 48.83 | 42 | W 1 |
| x-Las Vegas Sting | 5 | 7 | .417 | 2 | 5 | .286 | 372 | 484 | 31 | 40.3 | L 1 |
| Cleveland Thunderbolts | 2 | 10 | .167 | 1 | 5 | .167 | 445 | 548 | 37.08 | 45.67 | L 2 |
| Milwaukee Mustangs | 0 | 12 | .000 | 0 | 6 | .000 | 386 | 609 | 32.16 | 50.75 | L 12 |
National Conference
| xyz-Orlando Predators | 11 | 1 | .917 | 4 | 1 | .800 | 579 | 341 | 48.25 | 28.42 | L 1 |
| x-Tampa Bay Storm | 7 | 5 | .583 | 4 | 2 | .667 | 561 | 564 | 46.75 | 47 | W 1 |
| x-Charlotte Rage | 5 | 7 | .417 | 2 | 4 | .333 | 442 | 503 | 36.83 | 42.42 | L 1 |
| x-Fort Worth Cavalry | 5 | 7 | .417 | 3 | 2 | .600 | 556 | 490 | 36.66 | 41.92 | W 1 |
| Miami Hooters | 5 | 7 | .417 | 1 | 5 | .167 | 388 | 491 | 32.3 | 40.92 | W 1 |

z – clinched homefield advantage • y – clinched division title • x – clinched playoff spot

== Playoffs ==
The Sting were seeded sixth overall in the AFL playoffs.

| Round | Date | Opponent | Results | | Game site (attendance) |
| Round | Date | Opponent | Final score | Playoff record | Game site (attendance) |
|---|---|---|---|---|---|
| Quarterfinals | August 20 | at (3) Arizona Rattlers | L 24–52 | 0–1 | America West Arena (12,178) |

== Awards ==
| Position | Player | Award | All-Arena team |
|---|---|---|---|
| Offensive/defensive lineman | Robert Stewart | - | 1st |
| Offensive specialist | Khevin Pratt | - | 2nd |
