= 1994 Tampa Bay Storm season =

Arena Football League team season

- Owner: Bob Gries
- Head coach: Lary Kuharich
- Home stadium: Thunderdome

Results
- Record: 7-5
- Division place: 2nd
- Playoffs: Lost Quarterfinals (Marauders) 51–58

The 1994 Tampa Bay Storm season was the eighth season for the Arena Football League franchise. They finished 7–5 in the National Conference. The Storm lost in the AFL's Semi-finals to Orlando.

== Regular season ==
=== Schedule ===
Week	Date	Opponent	Results		Game site
Week	Date	Opponent	Final score	Team record	Game site
1	May 21	Charlotte Rage	L 39–44	0–1	Thunderdome
2	May 28	at Albany Firebirds	L 45–71	0–2	Knickerbocker Arena
3	June 4	Fort Worth Cavalry	W 58–45	1–2	Thunderdome
4	June 11	at Cleveland Thunderbolts	W 40–33	2–2	Richfield Coliseum
5	Bye				
6	June 25	Miami Hooters	W 47–32	3–2	Thunderdome
7	July 1	at Orlando Predators	L 40–61	3–3	Orlando Arena
8	July 9	Milwaukee Mustangs	W 69–35	4–3	Thunderdome
9	July 18	at Fort Worth Cavalry	W 53–43	5–3	Tarrant County Convention Center
10	July 23	Massachusetts Marauders	W 51–50	6–3	Thunderdome
11	July 30	at Arizona Rattlers	W 48–26	6–4	America West Arena
12	August 6	at Las Vegas Sting	L 58–63	6–5	MGM Grand Garden Arena
13	August 13	Orlando Predators	W 40–39	7–5	Thunderdome

=== Standings ===
1994 Arena Football League standings
Team	Overall			Conference			Scoring				
Team	W	L	PCT	W	L	PCT	PF	PA	PF (Avg.)	PA (Avg.)	STK
American Conference
xy-Albany Firebirds	10	2	.833	5	1	.833	642	507	53.5	42.25	W 2
x-Arizona Rattlers	8	4	.667	5	1	.833	525	441	43.75	36.75	W 1
x-Massachusetts Marauders	8	4	.667	6	1	.857	586	504	48.83	42	W 1
x-Las Vegas Sting	5	7	.417	2	5	.286	372	484	31	40.3	L 1
Cleveland Thunderbolts	2	10	.167	1	5	.167	445	548	37.08	45.67	L 2
Milwaukee Mustangs	0	12	.000	0	6	.000	386	609	32.16	50.75	L 12
National Conference
xyz-Orlando Predators	11	1	.917	4	1	.800	579	341	48.25	28.42	L 1
x-Tampa Bay Storm	7	5	.583	4	2	.667	561	564	46.75	47	W 1
x-Charlotte Rage	5	7	.417	2	4	.333	442	503	36.83	42.42	L 1
x-Fort Worth Cavalry	5	7	.417	3	2	.600	556	490	36.66	41.92	W 1
Miami Hooters	5	7	.417	1	5	.167	388	491	32.3	40.92	W 1

z – clinched homefield advantage

y – clinched division title

x – clinched playoff spot

== Playoffs ==
Round	Date	Opponent	Results		Game site
Round	Date	Opponent	Final score	Team record	Game site
1st	August 2	at Massachusetts Marauders	L 48–34	0–1	Centrum in Worcester
