= Ralph Jarvis =

American football player (born 1965)

No. 67, 92, 93, 98
- Position: Defensive end

Personal information
- Born: June 1, 1965 (age 61); Philadelphia, Pennsylvania, U.S.
- Listed height: 6 ft 4 in (1.93 m)
- Listed weight: 255 lb (116 kg)

Career information
- High school: Glen Mills(Glen Mills, Pennsylvania)
- College: Temple (1984–1987)
- NFL draft: 1988: 3rd round, 78th overall pick

Career history
- Chicago Bears (1988)*; New York Jets (1988); Ottawa Rough Riders (1988); New York Jets (1989)*; Buffalo Bills (1989)*; Calgary Stampeders (1989); Indianapolis Colts (1989)*; Buffalo Bills (1990)*; Indianapolis Colts (1990); Tampa Bay Storm (1992–1993); Massachusetts Marauders (1994); Milwaukee Mustangs (1995–1998); Arizona Rattlers (1998); New Jersey Red Dogs (1999)
- * Offseason or practice squad member only

Awards and highlights
- ArenaBowl champion (1993); First-team All-Arena (1995); 2× Second-team All-Arena (1994, 1996)

Career NFL statistics
- Fumble recoveries: 1
- Stats at Pro Football Reference
- Stats at ArenaFan.com

Ralph A. Jarvis (born June 1, 1965) is an American former professional football player who was a defensive end for one season with the Indianapolis Colts of the National Football League (NFL). He was selected by the Chicago Bears in the third round of the 1988 NFL draft after playing college football for the Temple Owls. Jarvis also played in the Arena Football League (AFL) and Canadian Football League (CFL).

== Early life and college ==
Ralph A. Jarvis was born on June 1, 1965, in Philadelphia, Pennsylvania. He attended Germantown High School in Philadelphia for two years but did not play football. He then played high school football at the juvenile reform school Glen Mills Schools, located in Glen Mills, Pennsylvania. He had previously played street basketball growing up.

Jarvis was a member of the Owls of Temple University from 1984 to 1987. He only played in three games during his junior year due to being suspended by head coach Bruce Arians for missing classes.

== Professional career ==
Jarvis was selected by the Chicago Bears in the third round, with the 78th overall pick, of the 1988 NFL draft. After being drafted by the Bears, Jarvis stated that he wanted to find the judge who sent him to Glen Mills schools and thank him. He officially signed with the team on May 17. He was waived on August 29, 1988. Jarvis was claimed off waivers by the New York Jets on August 30, 1988. He was released on September 14, 1988, before appearing in any games for the team. On September 20, 1988, Jarvis signed with the Ottawa Rough Riders of the Canadian Football League (CFL). He dressed in four games for the Rough Riders during the 1988 CFL season. On October 21, 1988, it was reported that he had been released. Jarvis signed a futures contract with the Jets on November 21, 1988. He was released on May 31, 1989.

He was signed by the Buffalo Bills on June 12, 1989, but later released on September 5, 1989. Jarvis signed with the Calgary Stampeders of the CFL on September 11, 1989. He dressed in one game for the Stampeders, posting one tackle and one fumble recovery, before being released on September 18, 1989. Jarvis was signed to the practice squad of the Indianapolis Colts on October 11, 1989. He was released by the Colts on December 26, 1989.

He signed with the Bills again on February 6, 1990, but was later waived on August 20, 1990. Jarvis was claimed off waivers by the Colts on August 22, 1990. He was released on September 3 and then signed to the team's practice squad. He was promoted to the active roster on October 19, 1990, and played in eight games for the Colts that year. Jarvis became a free agent after the 1990 season.

Jarvis played in nine games for the Tampa Bay Storm of the Arena Football League (AFL) in 1992, recording seven solo tackles, three sacks, one pass breakup, and six receptions for 55 yards and three touchdowns. He was an offensive lineman/defensive lineman during his time in the AFL as the league played under ironman rules. Jarvis appeared in six games in 1993, totaling two solo tackles, one assisted tackle, and seven catches for 99 yards and one touchdown. On August 21, 1993, the Storm won ArenaBowl VII against the Detroit Drive by a score of 51–31. Jarvis played in all 12 games for the Massachusetts Marauders of the AFL during the 1994 season, accumulating 15 solo tackles, five assisted tackles, two sacks, two forced fumbles, two pass breakups, and eight receptions for 56 yards and three touchdowns. The Marauders finished the year with an 8–4 record and lost in the semifinals to the Orlando Predators by a score of 51–42. Jarvis was named second-team All-Arena for his performance during the 1994 season.

Jarvis appeared in all 12 games for the AFL's Milwaukee Mustangs in 1995, recording ten solo tackles, seven assisted tackles, six sacks, one forced fumble, two pass breakups, three blocked kicks, four receptions for 78 yards and one touchdown, and one kick return for a three-yard touchdown. The Mustangs finished the season 4–8. Jarvis earned first-team All-Arena honors for the 1995 season. He played in all 14 games for Milwaukee in 1996, totaling 24 solo tackles, five assisted tackles, 8.5 sacks, one forced fumble, 14 pass breakups, two blocked kicks, and three catches for 19 yards and one touchdown. The Mustangs finished the season 10–4 and lost in the first round of the playoffs to the Albany Firebirds. Jarvis was named second-team All-Arena for the 1996 season. He appeared in all 14 games for the Mustangs for the second straight season in 1997, recording eight solo tackles, seven assisted tackles, 3.5 sacks, one forced fumble, seven pass breakups, four blocked kicks, and two receptions for 37 yards as Milwaukee went 8–6. He played in six games for the Mustangs in 1998, accumulating three solo tackles, two assisted tackles, one sack, one fumble recovery, and one catch for four yards. He was inactive for two weeks during the 1998 season after his father died.

On June 17, 1998, Jarvis was traded to the Arizona Rattlers for Bryan Hooks and Kevin Knox. Jarvis appeared in six games for the Rattlers that year, posting four solo tackles and four assisted tackles. Jarvis signed with the New Jersey Red Dogs of the AFL on March 18, 1999. He played in three games during his final AFL season in 1999 and recorded one interception.
