= 1994 Fort Worth Cavalry season =

Arena Football League team season

- Owner: Woody Kern
- General manager: Michael Trigg
- Head coach: Michael Trigg
- Home stadium: Tarrant County Convention Center

Results
- Record: 5-7
- Conference place: 4th
- Playoffs: Lost Quarterfinals 14-34 vs. Orlando Predators

The 1994 Fort Worth Cavalry season was the first and only season for the Arena Football League franchise.

== Pre-season ==
Week	Day	Date	Opponent	Results		Location	Attendance
Week	Day	Date	Opponent	Final score	Record	Location	Attendance
1	Friday	May 6	Tampa Bay Storm	L 30-50	---	Myriad Convention Center; Oklahoma City, Oklahoma	8,816
2	Friday	May 13	Arizona Rattlers	L –	---	Tarrant County Convention Center	

== Regular season ==
Week	Day	Date	Opponent	Results		Location	Attendance
Week	Day	Date	Opponent	Final score	Record	Location	Attendance
1	Bye						
2	Monday	May 23	Milwaukee Mustangs	W 65-28	1-0	Tarrant County Convention Center	2,852
3	Monday	May 30	Massachusetts Marauders	L 28-38	1-1	Tarrant County Convention Center	3,360
4	Saturday	June 4	at Tampa Bay Storm	L 45-58	1-2	Thunderdome	14,995
5	Friday	June 10	at Charlotte Rage	W 54-30	2-2	Charlotte Coliseum	9,631
6	Monday	June 20	Albany Firebirds	L 41-45	2-3	Tarrant County Convention Center	3,465
7	Friday	June 24	at Milwaukee Mustangs	W 50-44	3-3	Bradley Center	13,703
8	Monday	July 4	Charlotte Rage	W 42-20	4-3	Tarrant County Convention Center	3,126
9	Saturday	July 9	at Albany Firebirds	L 64-65 (OT)	4-4	Knickerbocker Arena	11,201
10	Monday	July 18	Tampa Bay Storm	L 43-53	4-5	Tarrant County Convention Center	3,107
11	Saturday	July 23	at Las Vegas Sting	L 34-47	4-6	MGM Grand Garden Arena	5,414
12	Friday	July 29	Las Vegas Sting	L 32-35	4-7	Tarrant County Convention Center	5,647
13	Friday	August 5	at Miami Hooters	W 58-27	5-7	Miami Arena	8,872

=== Standings ===
1994 Arena Football League standings
Team	Overall			Conference			Scoring				
Team	W	L	PCT	W	L	PCT	PF	PA	PF (Avg.)	PA (Avg.)	STK
American Conference
xy-Albany Firebirds	10	2	.833	5	1	.833	642	507	53.5	42.25	W 2
x-Arizona Rattlers	8	4	.667	5	1	.833	525	441	43.75	36.75	W 1
x-Massachusetts Marauders	8	4	.667	6	1	.857	586	504	48.83	42	W 1
x-Las Vegas Sting	5	7	.417	2	5	.286	372	484	31	40.3	L 1
Cleveland Thunderbolts	2	10	.167	1	5	.167	445	548	37.08	45.67	L 2
Milwaukee Mustangs	0	12	.000	0	6	.000	386	609	32.16	50.75	L 12
National Conference
xyz-Orlando Predators	11	1	.917	4	1	.800	579	341	48.25	28.42	L 1
x-Tampa Bay Storm	7	5	.583	4	2	.667	561	564	46.75	47	W 1
x-Charlotte Rage	5	7	.417	2	4	.333	442	503	36.83	42.42	L 1
x-Fort Worth Cavalry	5	7	.417	3	2	.600	556	490	36.66	41.92	W 1
Miami Hooters	5	7	.417	1	5	.167	388	491	32.3	40.92	W 1

z – clinched homefield advantage

y – clinched division title

x – clinched playoff spot

== Playoffs ==
=== Playoffs ===
Round	Day	Date	Opponent	Results		Location	Attendance
Round	Day	Date	Opponent	Final score	Record	Location	Attendance
1	Friday	August 19	at Orlando Predators	L 14-34	---	Orlando Arena	14,047

1994 Fort Worth Cavalry roster
Quarterbacks: 5 Todd Hammel; -- Kyle Mackey; Wide Receivers/Defensive Backs: -- Chris Barber; -- James Dixon; 21 Carlton Liggins	Fullbacks/Linebackers: -- Kelly Blackwell; 38 Charles Rowe; -- Chuck Witherspoon; Offensive/Defensive linemen: 8 Spencer Conley; 66 Monte Cuba; 99 Pat Danko; -- Brad William Henke; 83 Jerome Renners; -- Derrell Robertson; 55 Anthony Bifano	Wide Receivers/Linebackers: 1 Gary Compton; Kickers: 6 Ian Howfield	Injury Reserve Exempt List: Currently vacant; Rookies in italics Roster updated May 23, 1994; 16 Active, 0 Inactive → More rosters
