= Doc Wise =

American football player (born 1967)

No. 93
- Position: Offensive lineman / Defensive lineman

Personal information
- Born: August 8, 1967 (age 59)
- Listed height: 6 ft 3 in (1.91 m)
- Listed weight: 280 lb (127 kg)

Career information
- College: UNLV (1986–1989)
- NFL draft: 1990: undrafted

Career history
- San Diego Chargers (1990)*; Orlando Thunder (1991)*; New Orleans Night (1992); Arizona Rattlers (1993–1994)
- * Offseason or practice squad member only

Awards and highlights
- ArenaBowl champion (1994); First-team All-Arena (1992); Second-team All-Arena (1994); 2× First-team All-Big West (1988–1989)

Career AFL statistics
- Tackles: 49
- Sacks: 5
- Pass breakups: 12
- Receptions: 6
- Receiving TDs: 4
- Stats at ArenaFan.com

D'Artagain "Doc" Wise (born August 8, 1967) is an American former professional football lineman who played three seasons in the Arena Football League (AFL) with the New Orleans Night and Arizona Rattlers. He played college football at the University of Nevada, Las Vegas.

== Early life and college ==
D'Artagain Wise was born on August 8, 1967, one of ten children born to his parents. Both of his parents later died when he was 13. He was raised by his grandmother and sister in Los Angeles. Wise was a four-year letterman for the UNLV Rebels of the University of Nevada, Las Vegas from 1986 to 1989. He was a nose guard for the Rebels. Wise was named first-team All-Big West Conference by the coaches in both 1988 and 1989. He ended his college career with 280 tackles, the second most in school history at the time. He had five sacks in 1986 and three sacks in 1988.

== Professional career ==
Wise signed with the San Diego Chargers in May 1990 after going undrafted in the 1990 NFL draft. He was waived in late August 1990.

In February 1991, he was selected by the Orlando Thunder of the World League of American Football (WLAF) in the eighth round, with the 71st overall pick, of the 1991 WLAF defensive lineman draft. He was waived by the Thunder in March 1991.

Wise played in all ten games for the New Orleans Night of the Arena Football League (AFL) in 1992, recording 24 solo tackles, seven assisted tackles, two sacks, two fumble recoveries, and seven pass breakups. The Night finished the season with an 0–10 record. Wise was an offensive lineman/defensive lineman during his time in the AFL as the league played under ironman rules. He was named first-team All-Arena for his performance during the 1992 season.

Wise joined the Arizona Rattlers of the AFL in 1993. He appeared in seven games for the Rattlers during the 1993 season, totaling four solo tackles, three assisted tackles, two pass breakups, and one blocked kick. He missed some time that year due to an arm injury. Wise played in all 12 games in 1994, recording 11 solo tackles, ten assisted tackles, three sacks, three pass breakups, and six receptions for 52 yards and four touchdowns. The Rattlers finished the year with an 8–4 record and eventually advanced to ArenaBowl VIII, where they beat the Orlando Predators by a score of 36–31. Wise was named second-team All-Arena for the 1994 season. He was waived by the Rattlers in May 1995.
