= 1994 Albany Firebirds season =

Arena Football League team season

- Head coach: Mike Hohensee
- Home stadium: Knickerbocker Arena

Results
- Record: 10–2
- Division place: 1st, American
- Playoffs: L Semifinals vs. Arizona Rattlers

The 1994 Albany Firebirds season was the fifth season for the Albany Firebirds. They finished the 1994 season 10–2 and lost in the semifinals of the AFL playoffs to the Arizona Rattlers.

== Regular season ==
=== Schedule ===
| Week | Date | Opponent | Results | | Game site (attendance) |
| Week | Date | Opponent | Final score | Team record | Game site (attendance) |
|---|---|---|---|---|---|
| 1 | May 21 | Cleveland Thunderbolts | W 70–46 | 1–0 | Knickerbocker Arena (12,277) |
| 2 | May 28 | Tampa Bay Storm | W 71–45 | 2–0 | Knickerbocker Arena (11,882) |
| 3 | June 3 | at Miami Hooters | W 42–23 | 3–0 | Miami Arena (7,100) |
| 4 | Bye | | | | |
| 5 | June 20 | at Fort Worth Cavalry | W 45–41 | 4–0 | Tarrant County Convention Center (3,541) |
| 6 | June 25 | Orlando Predators | L 48–63 | 4–1 | Knickerbocker Arena (13,652) |
| 7 | July 1 | at Milwaukee Mustangs | W 50–27 | 5–1 | Bradley Center (15,055) |
| 8 | July 9 | Fort Worth Cavalry | W 65–64 ^{OT} | 6–1 | Knickerbocker Arena (11,201) |
| 9 | July 16 | at Cleveland Thunderbolts | W 62–40 | 7–1 | Richfield Coliseum (5,244) |
| 10 | July 23 | Arizona Rattlers | W 39–33 | 8–1 | Knickerbocker Arena (13,153) |
| 11 | July 30 | at Massachusetts Marauders | L 43–62 | 8–2 | Worcester Centrum (8,335) |
| 12 | August 6 | Milwaukee Mustangs | W 55–35 | 9–2 | Knickerbocker Arena (11,941) |
| 13 | August 12 | at Charlotte Rage | W 52–28 | 10–2 | Charlotte Coliseum (9,460) |

=== Standings ===
1994 Arena Football League standings
| Team | Overall | | | Conference | | | Scoring | | | | |
| Team | W | L | PCT | W | L | PCT | PF | PA | PF (Avg.) | PA (Avg.) | STK |
|---|---|---|---|---|---|---|---|---|---|---|---|
American Conference
| xy-Albany Firebirds | 10 | 2 | .833 | 5 | 1 | .833 | 642 | 507 | 53.5 | 42.25 | W 2 |
| x-Arizona Rattlers | 8 | 4 | .667 | 5 | 1 | .833 | 525 | 441 | 43.75 | 36.75 | W 1 |
| x-Massachusetts Marauders | 8 | 4 | .667 | 6 | 1 | .857 | 586 | 504 | 48.83 | 42 | W 1 |
| x-Las Vegas Sting | 5 | 7 | .417 | 2 | 5 | .286 | 372 | 484 | 31 | 40.3 | L 1 |
| Cleveland Thunderbolts | 2 | 10 | .167 | 1 | 5 | .167 | 445 | 548 | 37.08 | 45.67 | L 2 |
| Milwaukee Mustangs | 0 | 12 | .000 | 0 | 6 | .000 | 386 | 609 | 32.16 | 50.75 | L 12 |
National Conference
| xyz-Orlando Predators | 11 | 1 | .917 | 4 | 1 | .800 | 579 | 341 | 48.25 | 28.42 | L 1 |
| x-Tampa Bay Storm | 7 | 5 | .583 | 4 | 2 | .667 | 561 | 564 | 46.75 | 47 | W 1 |
| x-Charlotte Rage | 5 | 7 | .417 | 2 | 4 | .333 | 442 | 503 | 36.83 | 42.42 | L 1 |
| x-Fort Worth Cavalry | 5 | 7 | .417 | 3 | 2 | .600 | 556 | 490 | 36.66 | 41.92 | W 1 |
| Miami Hooters | 5 | 7 | .417 | 1 | 5 | .167 | 388 | 491 | 32.3 | 40.92 | W 1 |

z – clinched homefield advantage • y – clinched division title • x – clinched playoff spot

== Playoffs ==
The Firebirds were seeded second overall in the AFL playoffs.

| Round | Date | Opponent | Results | | Game site (attendance) |
| Round | Date | Opponent | Final score | Playoff record | Game site (attendance) |
|---|---|---|---|---|---|
| Quarterfinals | August 20 | (7) Las Vegas Sting | W 49–30 | 1–0 | Knickerbocker Arena (11,713) |
| Semifinals | August 27 | (3) Arizona Rattlers | L 40–33 | 1–1 | Knickerbocker Arena (11,762) |

== Awards ==
| Position | Player | Award | All-Arena team |
|---|---|---|---|
| Offensive specialist | Eddie Brown | - | 1st |
| Quarterback | Mike Perez | - | 2nd |
| Kicker | Franco Grilla | - | 2nd |
