= 1994 Milwaukee Mustangs season =

Arena Football League team season

- Head coach: Lou Saban (games 1–4); Art Haege (games 5–12)
- Home stadium: Bradley Center

Results
- Record: 0–12
- Division place: 6th, American
- Playoffs: Did not make playoffs

The 1994 Milwaukee Mustangs season was the first season for the Milwaukee Mustangs. They finished the 1994 season 0–12, and were one of two teams in the American Conference to miss the playoffs.

== Regular season ==
=== Schedule ===
Week	Date	Opponent	Results		Game site (attendance)
Week	Date	Opponent	Final score	Team record	Game site (attendance)
1	May 23	at Fort Worth Cavalry	L 28–65	0–1	Tarrant County Convention Center (2,852)
2	May 27	Orlando Predators	L 24–58	0–2	Bradley Center (14,087)
3	June 4	at Charlotte Rage	L 10–51	0–3	Charlotte Coliseum (11,800)
4	June 10	Las Vegas Sting	L 24–32	0–4	Bradley Center (12,155)
5	June 20	at Miami Hooters	L 27–35	0–5	Miami Arena (7,414)
6	June 24	Fort Worth Cavalry	L 44–50	0–6	Bradley Center (13,703)
7	July 1	Albany Firebirds	L 27–50	0–7	Bradley Center (15,055)
8	July 9	at Tampa Bay Storm	L 35–69	0–8	ThunderDome (20,266)
9	July 16	at Massachusetts Marauders	L 51–58	0–9	Worcester Centrum (7,223)
10	July 22	Cleveland Thunderbolts	L 41–42	0–10	Bradley Center (15,169)
11	Bye				
12	August 6	at Albany Firebirds	L 35–55	0–11	Knickerbocker Arena (11,941)
13	August 12	Massachusetts Marauders	L 30–44	0–12	Bradley Center (15,220)

=== Standings ===
1994 Arena Football League standings
Team	Overall			Conference			Scoring				
Team	W	L	PCT	W	L	PCT	PF	PA	PF (Avg.)	PA (Avg.)	STK
American Conference
xy-Albany Firebirds	10	2	.833	5	1	.833	642	507	53.5	42.25	W 2
x-Arizona Rattlers	8	4	.667	5	1	.833	525	441	43.75	36.75	W 1
x-Massachusetts Marauders	8	4	.667	6	1	.857	586	504	48.83	42	W 1
x-Las Vegas Sting	5	7	.417	2	5	.286	372	484	31	40.3	L 1
Cleveland Thunderbolts	2	10	.167	1	5	.167	445	548	37.08	45.67	L 2
Milwaukee Mustangs	0	12	.000	0	6	.000	386	609	32.16	50.75	L 12
National Conference
xyz-Orlando Predators	11	1	.917	4	1	.800	579	341	48.25	28.42	L 1
x-Tampa Bay Storm	7	5	.583	4	2	.667	561	564	46.75	47	W 1
x-Charlotte Rage	5	7	.417	2	4	.333	442	503	36.83	42.42	L 1
x-Fort Worth Cavalry	5	7	.417	3	2	.600	556	490	36.66	41.92	W 1
Miami Hooters	5	7	.417	1	5	.167	388	491	32.3	40.92	W 1

z – clinched homefield advantage • y – clinched division title • x – clinched playoff spot

== Awards ==
No Milwaukee players made the All–Arena teams.
