= 2024 IFL National Championship =

Massachusetts Pirates (3) (Eastern) (8–8)	Arizona Rattlers (3) (Western) (11–5)
16	53
Head coach: Rod Miller	Head coach: Kevin Guy
	1	2	3	4	Total
MASS	0	0	8	8	16
ARI	8	21	10	14	53
- Date: August 17, 2024
- Kickoff time: 3:11 p.m. CT
- Stadium: Lee's Family Forum; Henderson, Nevada
- MVP: Davontae Merriweather, defensive back
- Referee: Abram Anaya
- Attendance: 1,977

TV in the United States
- Network: Broadcast: CBS Sports Network; Streaming: FuboTV; Hulu; Youtube TV; Cable: DirecTV; Dish Network
- Announcers: Floyd Simmons (play-by-play); Kurtiss Riggs (analyst)

The 2024 IFL National Championship was an indoor American football championship game played to determine the champion of the Indoor Football League (IFL) for the 2024 season. A rematch of the 2021 United Bowl three years prior, the Western Conference champion Arizona Rattlers defeated the Eastern Conference champion Massachusetts Pirates 53–16, securing their first championship since the 2017 United Bowl, second in the IFL, and seventh overall as a franchise.

The game was played on August 17, 2024, at Lee's Family Forum in Henderson, Nevada. It was the final of a three-year partnership between the IFL and the venue to be the host of the IFL National Championship. The game was televised in the United States by the CBS Sports Network.

== Game summary ==
=== First half ===
After the Rattlers won the coin toss and deferred possession to the second half, the Pirates received the opening kickoff, which was muffed by Jimmie Robinson before he was tackled by Omari Alexander in the end zone for a 1-point rouge to give the Rattlers an early 1–0 lead. The Pirates were given possession of the football at their 5-yard line, driving down to the Rattlers' 2-yard line before Alexander forced Robinson to fumble with Dillion Winfrey recovering it. The Rattlers would drive down the field in five plays, with the drive ending in a 9-yard touchdown pass from Dalton Sneed to Jamal Miles, extending the Rattlers' lead to 8–0. The Pirates would attempt a 32-yard field goal on the following possession, failing to convert, giving the Rattlers the ball at their 15-yard line. They would give the ball to Shannon Brooks for a 13-yard rush to end the first quarter.

To start the second quarter, the Rattlers would push the ball downfield with their 6-play drive ending in a 6-yard rushing touchdown by Brooks. The Pirates' next possession ended with a turnover on downs on fourth and goal at the Arizona 7-yard line. Sneed would end the ensuing drive by rushing for a 10-yard touchdown. Four plays later, Pirates' quarterback Alejandro Bennifield threw an interception to Davontae Merriweather to set the Rattlers up at their 7-yard line. They would add seven more points on a Brooks 1-yard touchdown run to extend their lead to 29–0 going into halftime.

=== Box score ===
2024 IFL National Championship – Massachusetts Pirates vs Arizona Rattlers – Game summary

Quarter	1	2	3	4	Total
Pirates	0	0	8	8	16
Rattlers	8	21	10	14	53

at Lee's Family Forum, Henderson, Nevada

- Date: August 17, 2024
- Game time: 3:11 p.m. CST
- Game weather: None (indoor arena)
- Game attendance: 1,977
- Referee: Abram Anaya
- TV announcers (CBS Sports Network): Floyd Simmons (play-by-play), Kurtiss Riggs (analyst)

Scoring summary

Quarter	Time	Drive			Team	Scoring information	Score	
Quarter	Time	Plays	Yards	TOP	Team	Scoring information	MAS	ARI
1	15:00	—	—	—	ARI	Jimmie Robinson tackled in the end zone by Omari Alexander for a rouge	0	1
1	6:47	5	48	3:18	ARI	Jamal Miles 9-yard touchdown reception from Dalton Sneed, Dawson Evitts kick good	0	8
2	12:38	5	45	3:13	ARI	Shannon Brooks 6-yard touchdown run, Dawson Evitts kick good	0	15
2	3:20	3	43	1:15	ARI	Dalton Sneed 10-yard touchdown run, Dawson Evitts kick good	0	22
2	0:10	5	43	0:44	ARI	Shannon Brooks 1-yard touchdown run, Dawson Evitts kick good	0	29
3	9:15	8	22	5:45	ARI	23-yard field goal by Dawson Evitts	0	32
3	8:30	2	35	0:45	MAS	Jimmie Robinson 3-yard touchdown run, Henry Nell drop kick good	8	32
3	4:45	5	25	2:59	ARI	Jamal Miles 2-yard touchdown reception from Dalton Sneed, Dawson Evitts kick good	8	39
4	9:23	4	45	2:24	ARI	Shannon Brooks 12-yard touchdown run, Dawson Evitts kick good	8	46
4	5:40	1	14	0:25	ARI	Garrett Kettle 14-yard touchdown run, Dawson Evitts kick good	8	53
4	4:20	1	12	0:40	MAS	Teo Redding 12-yard touchdown reception from Alejandro Bennifield, Henry Nell drop kick good	16	53
"TOP" = time of possession. For other American football terms, see Glossary of American football.							16	53

== Final statistics ==
=== Statistical comparison ===
Team-to-team comparison
	MAS	ARI
First downs
Total	13	19
Rushing	3	13
Passing	8	3
Penalty	2	3
Rushing
Rushing attempts	14	26
Net rushing yards	78	194
Avg. yards / attempt	5.6	7.5
Rushing touchdowns	1	5
Passing
Passing: completions–attempts	11–30	10–17
Net passing yards	123	60
Avg. yards / attempt	4.1	3.5
Avg. yards / completion	11.2	6.0
Passing touchdowns	1	2
Interceptions thrown	3	1
Sacks: total–yards	1–7	1–4
Total offense
Plays	45	44
Total net yards	201	254
Avg. yards / play	4.5	5.8
Offensive touchdowns	2	7
Fumbles: total–lost	1–1	1–0
Penalties: total–yards	11–82	5–34
Kicking
Kickoffs: total–yards	3–141	9–468
Avg. yards / kickoff	47.0	52.0
Touchbacks	0	1
Field goals: made–attempts	0–1	1–1
Point afters: made–attempts	2–2	8–8
Returning
Kickoffs: returns–yards	8–111	0–0
Avg. yards / kick return	13.9	0.0
Kick return touchdowns	0	0
Punts: returns–yards	0–0	0–0
Avg. yards / punt return	0.0	0.0
Punt return touchdowns	0	0
Interceptions: returns–yards	1–0	3–27
Avg. yards / interception return	0.0	9.0
Interception return touchdowns	0	0
Fumbles: returns–yards	0–0	0–0
Avg. yards / fumble return	0.0	0.0
Fumble return touchdowns	0	0
Efficiency
Third down conversions	2–9	1–6
Fourth down conversions	0–4	2–4
Two-point conversions	0–0	0–0
Red zone trips	1–4	5–5

=== Individual statistics ===
Massachusetts statistics
Pirates passing
	Cmp	Att	Yds	TD	Int
Alejandro Bennifield	11	30	127	1	3
Pirates rushing
	Att	Yds	Avg	Lng	TD
Jimmie Robinson	10	41	4.1	19	1
Alejandro Bennifield	3	34	11.3	32	0
Isaac Zico	1	3	3.0	3	0
Pirates receiving
	Rec	Yds	Avg	Lng	TD
Teo Redding	5	41	8.2	12	1
Isaac Zico	3	35	11.7	17	0
Darren Carrington II	2	29	14.5	17	0
Jimmie Robinson	1	22	22.0	22	0

Arizona statistics
Rattlers passing
	Cmp	Att	Yds	TD	Int
Dalton Sneed	10	15	67	2	0
Garrett Kettle	0	2	0	0	1
Rattlers rushing
	Att	Yds	Avg	Lng	TD
Shannon Brooks	13	69	5.3	16	3
Dalton Sneed	7	61	8.7	31	1
Glen Gibbons Jr.	1	19	19.0	19	0
Nih-Jer Jackson	1	15	15.0	15	0
Garrett Kettle	1	14	14.0	14	1
Corey Reed Jr.	1	10	10.0	10	0
Jamal Miles	2	6	3.0	6	0
Rattlers receiving
	Rec	Yds	Avg	Lng	TD
Corey Reed Jr.	3	22	7.3	12	0
Jamal Miles	3	19	6.3	9	2
Shannon Brooks	3	18	6.0	7	0
Glen Gibbons Jr.	1	8	8.0	8	0
