= 1994 Cleveland Thunderbolts season =

Arena Football League team season

- Owner: John Kuczek
- General manager: Jeff Kuczek
- Head coach: Earle Bruce
- Home stadium: Richfield Coliseum

Results
- Record: 2–10
- Division place: 5th
- Playoffs: Did not qualify

The 1994 Cleveland Thunderbolts season was their third in Cleveland, Ohio, United States, and the fourth overall for the Arena Football League franchise. They went 2–10 and failed to make the playoffs. The 1994 season was their final season.

== Regular season ==
=== Schedule ===
Week	Date	Opponent	Results		Game site
Week	Date	Opponent	Final score	Team record	Game site
1	May 21	at Albany Firebirds	L 46-70	0–1	Knickerbocker Arena
2	May 28	at Arizona Rattlers	L 40-64	0-2	America West Arena
3	June 1	Arizona Rattlers	L 33-41	0-3	Richfield Coliseum
4	June 11	Tampa Bay Storm	L 33-40	0-4	Richfield Coliseum
5	June 18	at Las Vegas Sting	L 22-26	0-5	MGM Grand Garden Arena
6	June 25	Las Vegas Sting	W 46-20	1-5	Richfield Coliseum
7	June 30	Massachusetts Marauders	L 48-57	1-6	Richfield Coliseum
8	July 8	at Charlotte Rage	L 23-43	1-7	Charlotte Coliseum
9	July 16	Albany Firebirds	L 40-62	1-8	Richfield Coliseum
10	July 22	at Milwaukee Mustangs	W 42-41	2–8	Bradley Center
11	July 29	at Orlando Predators	L 32-41	2–9	Orlando Arena
12	Bye				
13	August 13	Miami Hooters	L 40-43	2–10	Richfield Coliseum

=== Standings ===
1994 Arena Football League standings
Team	Overall			Conference			Scoring				
Team	W	L	PCT	W	L	PCT	PF	PA	PF (Avg.)	PA (Avg.)	STK
American Conference
xy-Albany Firebirds	10	2	.833	5	1	.833	642	507	53.5	42.25	W 2
x-Arizona Rattlers	8	4	.667	5	1	.833	525	441	43.75	36.75	W 1
x-Massachusetts Marauders	8	4	.667	6	1	.857	586	504	48.83	42	W 1
x-Las Vegas Sting	5	7	.417	2	5	.286	372	484	31	40.3	L 1
Cleveland Thunderbolts	2	10	.167	1	5	.167	445	548	37.08	45.67	L 2
Milwaukee Mustangs	0	12	.000	0	6	.000	386	609	32.16	50.75	L 12
National Conference
xyz-Orlando Predators	11	1	.917	4	1	.800	579	341	48.25	28.42	L 1
x-Tampa Bay Storm	7	5	.583	4	2	.667	561	564	46.75	47	W 1
x-Charlotte Rage	5	7	.417	2	4	.333	442	503	36.83	42.42	L 1
x-Fort Worth Cavalry	5	7	.417	3	2	.600	556	490	36.66	41.92	W 1
Miami Hooters	5	7	.417	1	5	.167	388	491	32.3	40.92	W 1

z – clinched homefield advantage

y – clinched division title

x – clinched playoff spot

== Roster ==
1994 Cleveland Thunderbolts roster
Quarterbacks: -- Kenton Carr; -- Major Harris; -- John Kaleo; -- Tony Lowery; Wide Receivers/Defensive Backs: -- Ernest Priester	Fullbacks/Linebackers: -- Richard Belanger; -- Cedric McKinnon; -- Donnie Mollick; Offensive Linemen/Defensive Linemen	Wide Receivers/Linebackers: -- Tracey Shoemo; Kickers: -- Brian Mitchell; Rookies in italics Roster updated August 14, 2013; 25 Active, 0 Inactive, 0 PS → More rosters
