= 1994 Las Vegas Sting season =

Arena Football League team season

- Head coach: Babe Parilli
- Home stadium: MGM Grand Garden Arena

Results
- Record: 5–7
- Division place: 4th, American
- Playoffs: L Quarterfinals vs. Albany Firebirds

The 1994 Las Vegas Sting season was the first season for the Las Vegas Sting. They finished the 1994 season 5–7 and lost in the quarterfinals of the AFL playoffs to the Albany Firebirds.

== Regular season ==
=== Schedule ===
Week	Date	Opponent	Results		Game site (attendance)
Week	Date	Opponent	Final score	Team record	Game site (attendance)
1	May 21	Miami Hooters	L 22–35	0–1	MGM Grand Garden Arena (10,109)
2	May 26	Massachusetts Marauders	L 30–31	0–2	MGM Grand Garden Arena (5,038)
3	June 3	at Orlando Predators	L 9–38	0–3	Amway Arena (13,995)
4	June 10	at Milwaukee Mustangs	W 32–24	1–3	Bradley Center (12,155)
5	June 18	Cleveland Thunderbolts	W 26–22	2–3	MGM Grand Garden Arena (3,962)
6	June 25	at Cleveland Thunderbolts	L 20–46	2–4	Richfield Coliseum (8,322)
7	July 2	Arizona Rattlers	L 7–50	2–5	MGM Grand Garden Arena (5,018)
8	July 8	at Massachusetts Marauders	L 45–63	2–6	Worcester Centrum (5,907)
9	Bye				
10	July 23	Fort Worth Cavalry	W 47–37	3–6	MGM Grand Garden Arena (5,414)
11	July 29	at Fort Worth Cavalry	W 35–32	4–6	Tarrant County Convention Center (7,021)
12	August 6	Tampa Bay Storm	W 63–58	5–6	MGM Grand Garden Arena (8,941)
13	August 12	at Arizona Rattlers	L 46–51	5–7	Talking Stick Resort Arena (15,102)

=== Standings ===
1994 Arena Football League standings
Team	Overall			Conference			Scoring				
Team	W	L	PCT	W	L	PCT	PF	PA	PF (Avg.)	PA (Avg.)	STK
American Conference
xy-Albany Firebirds	10	2	.833	5	1	.833	642	507	53.5	42.25	W 2
x-Arizona Rattlers	8	4	.667	5	1	.833	525	441	43.75	36.75	W 1
x-Massachusetts Marauders	8	4	.667	6	1	.857	586	504	48.83	42	W 1
x-Las Vegas Sting	5	7	.417	2	5	.286	372	484	31	40.3	L 1
Cleveland Thunderbolts	2	10	.167	1	5	.167	445	548	37.08	45.67	L 2
Milwaukee Mustangs	0	12	.000	0	6	.000	386	609	32.16	50.75	L 12
National Conference
xyz-Orlando Predators	11	1	.917	4	1	.800	579	341	48.25	28.42	L 1
x-Tampa Bay Storm	7	5	.583	4	2	.667	561	564	46.75	47	W 1
x-Charlotte Rage	5	7	.417	2	4	.333	442	503	36.83	42.42	L 1
x-Fort Worth Cavalry	5	7	.417	3	2	.600	556	490	36.66	41.92	W 1
Miami Hooters	5	7	.417	1	5	.167	388	491	32.3	40.92	W 1

z – clinched homefield advantage • y – clinched division title • x – clinched playoff spot

== Playoffs ==
The Sting were seeded seventh overall in the AFL playoffs.

Round	Date	Opponent	Results		Game site (attendance)
Round	Date	Opponent	Final score	Playoff record	Game site (attendance)
Quarterfinals	August 20	at (2) Albany Firebirds	L 30–49	0–1	Knickerbocker Arena (11,713)

== Awards ==
Position	Player	Award	All-Arena team
Defensive specialist	Carlos Johnson	-	1st
