= Cedric Tillman (arena football) =

American football player (born 1970)

No. 80
- Positions: Wide receiver, defensive back

Personal information
- Born: April 22, 1970 (age 56); Pueblo, Colorado, U.S.
- Listed height: 6 ft 0 in (1.83 m)
- Listed weight: 190 lb (86 kg)

Career information
- College: Northern Colorado (1986–1989)
- NFL draft: 1990: undrafted

Career history
- Chicago Bears (1990)*; Denver Dynamite (1991); Arizona Rattlers (1992–1999)
- * Offseason or practice squad member only

Awards and highlights
- 2× ArenaBowl champion (1994, 1997); Second-team All-Arena (1994)

Career AFL statistics
- Receptions: 168
- Receiving yards: 2,355
- Tackles: 80
- Interceptions: 4
- Total TDs: 33
- Stats at ArenaFan.com

Cedric Tillman (born April 22, 1970) is an American former professional football player who played eight seasons in the Arena Football League (AFL) with the Denver Dynamite and Arizona Rattlers. He played college football at the University of Northern Colorado. Tillman was named second-team All-Arena in 1994. He was a member of the Rattlers teams that won ArenaBowl VIII and ArenaBowl XI.

== Early life and college ==
Cedric Tillman was born on, April 22, 1970. He was a four-year letterman for the Northern Colorado Bears of the University of Northern Colorado from 1986 to 1989.

== Professional career ==
Tillman signed with the Chicago Bears on May 1, 1990, after going undrafted in the 1990 NFL draft. He was waived on August 7, 1990, after suffering a separated shoulder.

Tillman played in one game for the Denver Dynamite of the Arena Football League (AFL) in 1991, posting two solo tackles and two assisted tackles. He was a wide receiver/defensive back during his time in the AFL as the league played under ironman rules.

Tillman appeared in all ten games for the Arizona Rattlers of the AFL in 1992, catching 53 passes for 702 yards and ten touchdowns on offense while recording 24 solo tackles, five assisted tackles, two interceptions, six pass breakups, and one forced fumble on defense. The Rattlers finished the season with a 4–6 record. He played in 11 games in 1993, totaling 26 receptions for 512 yards and seven touchdowns, 13 solo tackles, three assisted tackles, one interception, and one pass breakup. Tillman appeared in all 12 games for the Rattlers during the 1994 season, accumulating 57 catches for 801 yards and 11 touchdowns, 23 solo tackles, two assisted tackles, three pass breakups, and one fumble recovery. The Ratters finished the year with an 8–4 record and eventually advanced to ArenaBowl VIII, where they beat the Orlando Predators by a score of 36–31. Tillman was named second-team All-Arena for his performance during the 1994 season. He played in eight games in 1995, totaling 17 receptions for 188 yards and three touchdowns, three solo tackles, four assisted tackles, and two pass breakups. He was placed on injured reserve in April 1996 before the start of the 1996 AFL season. He did not play any in 1996. Tillman appeared in nine games in 1997, catching nine passes for 86 yards and two touchdowns while also recording two solo tackles, nine assisted tackles, one interception, and one forced fumble. The Rattlers finished the season with a 12–2 record and advanced to ArenaBowl XI, where they defeated the Iowa Barnstormers 55–33. He only played in two games in 1998, spending part of the year on injured reserve. Tillman appeared in six games during his final season with the Rattlers in 1999, totaling one catch for 12 yards, one assisted tackle, and one blocked kick. He had a day job as a counselor while with the Ratters.
