= Khevin Pratt =

American football player (born 1970)

No. 84, 88
- Position: Wide receiver

Personal information
- Born: May 16, 1970 (age 56); Los Angeles, California, U.S.
- Listed height: 5 ft 11 in (1.80 m)
- Listed weight: 185 lb (84 kg)

Career information
- High school: Crenshaw (Los Angeles)
- College: El Camino (1989); Utah (1990); Chico State (1991–1992)
- NFL draft: 1993: undrafted

Career history
- Sacramento Gold Miners (1993); Charlotte Rage (1994–1995); Philadelphia Eagles (1996)*; Nashville Kats (1997); Milwaukee Mustangs (1998); New York CityHawks (1998); Portland Forest Dragons (1999)
- * Offseason or practice squad member only

Awards and highlights
- Second-team All-Arena (1994); AFL receiving yards leader (1994); Second-team All-NCAC (1991); First-team All-Mission Conference (1989)

Career AFL statistics
- Receptions: 265
- Receiving yards: 3,825
- Receiving TDs: 64
- Returns: 25
- Return yards: 358
- Stats at ArenaFan.com

Khevin R. Pratt (born May 16, 1970), nicknamed The Jet, is an American former professional football wide receiver who played five seasons in the Arena Football League (AFL) with the Charlotte Rage, Nashville Kats, Milwaukee Mustangs, New York CityHawks and Portland Forest Dragons. He played college football at El Camino College, the University of Utah, and California State University, Chico. He also played for the Sacramento Gold Miners of the Canadian Football League (CFL).

== Early life ==
Khevin R. Pratt was born on May 16, 1970, in Los Angeles, California. He played high school football at Crenshaw High School in Los Angeles. As a senior in 1987, he earned second-team all-league and first-team 4A all-city honors. Pratt also participated in track and field in high school. He graduated from Crenshaw High in 1988.

== College career ==
Pratt first played college football at El Camino College in 1989, garnering first-team All-Mission Conference and honorable mention all-state recognition. He also participated in track while at El Camino.

Pratt then transferred to play for the Utah Utes of the University of Utah in 1990. He caught three passes for 63 yards for the Utes during the 1990 season while also returning 12 kicks for 182 yards.

Pratt was then a two-year letterman for the Chico State Wildcats of California State University, Chico from 1991 to 1992 in both football and track. He caught 43 passes for 1,142 yards in 1991, earning second-team All-Northern California Athletic Conference honors. Pratt also ran for the Santa Monica Track Club in 1992.

== Professional career ==
Pratt's 4.4 second 40-yard dash was the fastest at the Multi League combine in 1993, which was a supplemental combine for players were not invited to the NFL Scouting Combine. He went undrafted in the 1993 NFL draft.

On June 1, 1993, it was reported that Pratt had been signed by the Sacramento Gold Miners of the Canadian Football League (CFL). He dressed in three games for the Gold Miners during the 1993 season and caught one pass for 17 yards. He also spent time on the team's practice roster.

Pratt played in all 12 games for the Charlotte Rage of the Arena Football League (AFL) in 1994, recording 86 receptions for 1,387 yards and 23 touchdowns and 17 kick returns for 289 yards. The Rage finished the year with a 5–7 record. Pratt's 1,387 receiving yards were the most in the league that year. He was named second-team All-Arena as an offensive specialist for his performance during the 1994 season. He appeared in three games for the Rage in 1995 and caught five passes for 105 yards and one touchdown.

Pratt signed a one-year contract with the Philadelphia Eagles of the National Football League in March 1996. He was cut by the Eagles on August 20, 1996.

Pratt appeared in six games for the AFL's Nashville Kats in 1997, totaling 43 catches for 598 yards and 11 touchdowns, two solo tackles, and one kick return for 16 yards.

On April 1, 1998, Pratt was traded to the Milwaukee Mustangs for defensive specialist George Harris. Pratt played in two games for the Mustangs during the 1998 season and caught 11 passes for 132 yards and three touchdowns.

On May 28, 1998, it was reported that Pratt had been traded to the New York CityHawks for wide receiver Bryan Reeves. Pratt played in eight games for the CityHawks that year, recording 41 receptions for 634 yards and seven touchdowns, four kick returns for 14 yards, and one rush for two yards.

Pratt played in 12 games for the Portland Forest Dragons during his final season in the AFL in 1999, totaling 79 catches for 969 yards and 19 touchdowns, three kick returns for 39 yards, and one solo tackle.
