= Rusty Russell (tackle) =

American football player (born 1963)

No. 79, 77
- Position: Offensive tackle

Personal information
- Born: August 16, 1963 (age 63); Orangeburg, South Carolina, U.S.
- Listed height: 6 ft 5 in (1.96 m)
- Listed weight: 295 lb (134 kg)

Career information
- High school: Wilkinson (Orangeburg)
- College: South Carolina
- NFL draft: 1984: 3rd round, 60th overall pick

Career history
- Philadelphia Eagles (1984); Los Angeles Raiders (1986); Orlando Predators (1991–1995); Charlotte Rage (1996); Florida Bobcats (1997)

Awards and highlights
- Second-team All-Arena (1994)

Career NFL statistics
- Games played: 1
- Stats at Pro Football Reference
- Stats at ArenaFan.com

William "Rusty" Russell (born August 16, 1963) is an American former professional football player who was a tackle for one season with the Philadelphia Eagles of the National Football League (NFL). He was selected by the Eagles in the third round of the 1984 NFL draft after playing college football at the University of South Carolina. Russell also played in the Arena Football League (AFL).

== Early life and college ==
William Russell was born on August 16, 1963, in Orangeburg, South Carolina. He attended Orangeburg-Wilkinson High School in Orangeburg.

Russell was a member of the South Carolina Gamecocks of the University of South Carolina from 1980 to 1983.

== Professional career ==
Russell was selected by the Philadelphia Eagles in the third round, with the 60th overall pick, of the 1984 NFL draft. He officially signed with the Eagles on June 19. He was placed on injured reserve on August 28 and later activated on October 18, 1984. Russell played in one game for the Eagles during the 1984 season. He was released on August 20, 1985.

Russell signed a futures contract with the Los Angeles Raiders on November 1, 1985. He was placed on injured reserve on August 26, 1986, and missed the entire 1986 season. He was released by the Rams on September 1, 1987.

Russell played in 50 games for the Orlando Predators of the Arena Football League (AFL) from 1991 to 1995. He was an offensive lineman/defensive lineman during his time in the AFL as the league played under ironman rules. He was named second-team All-Arena in 1994.

Russell played in all 14 games for the Charlotte Rage of the AFL in 1996. On May 2, 1997, before the start of the 1997 AFL season, it was reported that Russell had signed with the Florida Bobcats. He appeared in 12 games for the Bobcats in 1997. He finished his AFL career with totals of 52 solo tackles, 13 assisted tackles, 7.5 sacks, one interception, 18 pass breakups, three fumble recoveries, and five blocked kicks in 77 games played.
