= Riley Ware =

American football player (born 1962)

No. 29, 26
- Position: Defensive back

Personal information
- Born: 1966 or 1967 (aged 58–59)
- Listed height: 5 ft 10 in (1.78 m)
- Listed weight: 170 lb (77 kg)

Career information
- High school: Cypress Lake (Cypress Lake, Florida)
- College: Western Kentucky
- NFL draft: 1990: undrafted

Career history
- Detroit Lions (1991)*; Tampa Bay Storm (1991); Cincinnati Rockers (1992); Charlotte Rage (1993)*; Orlando Predators (1993); Massachusetts Marauders (1994); Charlotte Rage (1995); St. Louis Stampede (1995); Connecticut Coyotes (1996)*; Charlotte Rage (1996)
- * Offseason or practice squad member only

Awards and highlights
- ArenaBowl champion (1991); Second-team All-Arena (1994)

Career AFL statistics
- Tackles: 199.5
- Interceptions: 17
- Pass breakups: 36
- Returns: 102
- Return yards: 1,732
- Stats at ArenaFan.com

Riley Ware III (born 1966 or 1967) is an American former professional football defensive back who played six seasons in the Arena Football League (AFL) with the Tampa Bay Storm, Cincinnati Rockers, Orlando Predators, Massachusetts Marauders, Charlotte Rage, and St. Louis Stampede. He played college football at Western Kentucky University, and signed with the Detroit Lions in 1991 after a year out of football. He was waived by the Lions in August 1991 and made his AFL debut in ArenaBowl V that same month. Ware was named second-team All-Arena while playing for the Massachusetts Marauders in 1994. He was later the head coach of the Florida Stingrays of the American Indoor Football Association in 2008.

== Early life and college ==
Riley Ware III was born in 1966 or 1967, and grew up in Fort Myers, Florida. He played high school football and basketball at Cypress Lake High School in Cypress Lake, Florida. Ware was named to The News-Press All-Southwest Florida basketball team. He graduated from Cypress Lake in 1985.

In April 1985, Ware verbally committed to play college football for the Western Kentucky Hilltoppers of Western Kentucky University. He was redshirted in 1985 and was on the main roster from 1986 to 1989. Ware missed part of the 1986 season due to appendicitis. He was a two-year letterman from 1988 to 1989. In November 1988, Ware reported to police that an amplifier and a case of cassettes, altogether worth $565, had been stolen from his 1988 Nissan that was parked in a college parking lot. $150 worth of damage was also done to the Nissan. Ware started seven games his senior year in 1989 and posted 26 tackles. He graduated from Kentucky with a Bachelor of Science in business administration in May 1991. In August 1995, The Park City Daily News named Ware as an honorable mention on its 1985–1995 Western Kentucky All-Decade team.

== Professional career ==
Ware went undrafted in the 1990 NFL draft. After not playing football at all in 1990, Ware attended minicamp with the Detroit Lions in March 1991. Afterwards, he signed with the Lions on March 22, 1991, with the Lions' director of pro scouting Ron Hughes stating "I think he's competitive and he has speed." Ware was waived on August 13, 1991.

Several days prior to ArenaBowl V, the Tampa Bay Storm of the Arena Football League (AFL) were short on defensive backs due to injuries. Detroit Lions assistant coach Len Fontes, who was the brother of Tampa Bay Storm defensive coordinator John Fontes and Lions head coach Wayne Fontes, called John to offer him the services of Riley Ware. Ware signed with the Storm, stating that he was heading back to Fort Myers anyway. He was penciled into the team's starting lineup despite never having played arena football, with John Fontes stating "It's a little scary having a guy back there who's never played Arena Football before." On August 17, 1991, in the ArenaBowl against the Detroit Drive, Drive receiver Gary Mullen beat Ware for a 34-yard reception on the Drive's first offensive play. Mullen then scored a ten-yard touchdown over Ware on the next play. However, the Storm ended up winning the game by a score of 48–42. Ware received an ArenaBowl championship ring.

Ware followed Storm head coach Fran Curci to the Cincinnati Rockers, signing with the team for the 1992 season. Ware played in all ten games for the Rockers in 1992, recording 41 solo tackles, nine assisted tackles, six interceptions, eight pass breakups, two fumble recoveries, and 18 receptions for 305 yards. He was a wide receiver/defensive back during his time in the AFL as the league played under ironman rules. He also spent time as a defensive specialist. The Rockers finished the 1992 season with a 7–3 record and lost in the first round of the playoffs to Ware's former team, the Storm, by a score of 41–36. After Curci quit the Rockers, Ware wanted to leave as well. As a result, he was traded to the Charlotte Rage for the 1993 season. However, he refused to report to the Rage due to wanting to be closer to his family, who lived in Fort Myers. Before the start of the 1993 season, the Rage traded Ware to the Florida-based Orlando Predators for Scott Reagan. Ware played in six games for the Predators in 1993, totaling 36 solo tackles, six assisted tackles, three interceptions, eight pass breakups, one forced fumble, and one fumble recovery. He earned $500 per game during the 1993 season with an $100 bonus for victories.

In April 1994, Ware was traded to the Massachusetts Marauders for James Goode. Ware appeared in 11 games in 1994, recording 58 solo tackles, five assisted tackles, three interceptions, 14 pass breakups, two forced fumbles, one fumble recovery, and 40 catches for 765 yards and one touchdown. The Marauders finished the season with an 8–4 record and lost in the semifinals to Ware's former team, the Predators, by a margin of 51–42. Ware was named second-team All-Arena for his performance during the 1994 season.

Ware signed with the Rage again in 1995. He played in six games for Charlotte during the 1995 season, accumulating 16 solo tackles, two assisted tackles, three interceptions, three pass breakups, and 13 receptions for 218 yards. He was waived in June 1995.

Ware signed with the St. Louis Stampede of the AFL in June 1995. He posted 11 solo tackles, two assisted tackles, one interception, and one pass breakup for the Stampede during the 1995 season before being waived in early August 1995.

Ware was claimed off waivers by the Connecticut Coyotes on August 5, 1995, after the team's season had ended. He was waived by the Coyotes on February 13, 1996.

On February 14, 1996, Ware was awarded to the Rage off waivers, returning to the team for the third time. He played in nine games for the Rage during his final AFL season in 1996, totaling 23 solo tackles, five assisted tackles, one interception, two pass breakups, and 31 receptions for 444 yards.

== Personal life and coaching career ==
Ware's son, Jeremy Ware, played in the NFL. On September 11, 1991, Riley, along with another man, was placed on two-years probation after pleading guilty to stealing credit cards from Western Kentucky's Keen Hall in spring 1991.

Ware was a substitute teacher for the School District of Lee County during his AFL career. He was also an assistant football coach and head boys' track coach at Cape Coral High School. Ware was the defensive coordinator of the Florida Firecats of the af2 from 2001 to 2002. He was fired by the Firecats after the fourth game of the 2002 season due to friction with head coach John Fourcade. Ware was the defensive coordinator for the Florida Stingrays of the American Indoor Football Association in 2008. After an 0–7 start to the season, Stingrays' head coach B. J. Jernigan was fired and replaced by Ware. The Stingrays ended up finishing the season with an 0–14 record. As of 2010, Ware was still a teacher and coach in Lee County.
