= Gene Nudo =

American football player and coach (born 1958)

Profile
- Position: Former head coach/President/General manager

Personal information
- Born: April 13, 1958 (age 68); Norridge, Illinois, U.S.

Career history
- 2006–2007: Arizona Rattlers

Gene Nudo (born April 13, 1958) is a former Arena Football League coach for the Arizona Rattlers He had a career record of 13–21, including a 1–1 mark in the postseason. 2011 Inducted into the AFL Hall of Fame; 3 time Executive of the year (1997, 1999, 2000), recipient of the Founders Award for lifetime service to the AFL. Nudo spent 8 years as the head coach of Fenwick High School in Oak Park, Illinois. Also former head coach of 1991 Undefeated Illinois High School State Champion Driscoll Catholic High School from Addison, Illinois. Career record as a high school coach is 102–41–1. As a coach, is also a member of Chicago Minor League Football, Minor Pro Football, Driscoll Catholic High School and Ridgewood High School Hall of Fame.
