= Donald Brown (defensive back) =

American football player (born 1963)

No. 32, 47
- Position: Cornerback

Personal information
- Born: November 28, 1963 (age 62); Annapolis, Maryland, U.S.
- Listed height: 5 ft 11 in (1.80 m)
- Listed weight: 189 lb (86 kg)

Career information
- High school: Annapolis (Maryland)
- College: Maryland
- NFL draft: 1986: 5th round, 129th overall pick

Career history
- San Diego Chargers (1986); Miami Dolphins (1986); Los Angeles Raiders (1987)*; New York Giants (1987); Miami Hooters (1994–1995)
- * Offseason or practice squad member only

Awards and highlights
- Second-team All-Arena (1994)

Career NFL statistics
- Interceptions: 2
- Fumble recoveries: 3
- Stats at Pro Football Reference
- Stats at ArenaFan.com

Donald Brown (born November 28, 1963) is an American former professional football player who was a defensive back for two seasons in the National Football League (NFL) with the San Diego Chargers, Miami Dolphins, and New York Giants. He was selected by the Chargers in the fifth round of the 1986 NFL draft. He played college football for the Oklahoma Sooners before transferring to the Maryland Terrapins. Brown also played for the Miami Hooters of the Arena Football League (AFL). He was named second-team All-Arena in 1994.

== Early life ==
Donald Brown was born on November 28, 1963, in Annapolis, Maryland. He played high school football at Annapolis High School in Annapolis. He earned Arundel Sun All-County honors as a running back his senior year in 1980. He set a single-game school record with 276 rushing yards that season. Brown also played baseball and basketball in high school.

== College career ==
Brown was a member of the Oklahoma Sooners of the University of Oklahoma in 1981 as a running back but played very sparingly. On December 31, 1981, it was reported that he would likely redshirt the 1982 season. By December 1983, Brown had transferred to the University of Maryland, College Park, for the 1984 season. He ended up switching to defensive back in 1984. He recorded one interception and five kick returns for 53 yards that year. He made one interception in 1985.

== Professional career ==
Brown was selected by the San Diego Chargers in the fifth round, with the 129th overall pick, of the 1986 NFL draft. He officially signed with the team on July 21. He played in 13 games, starting seven, for the Chargers in 1986, recording one interception and two fumble recoveries. Brown was released on December 2, 1986.

Brown signed with the Miami Dolphins on December 9, 1986. He appeared in two games for the Dolphins during the 1986 season. He was released on August 18, 1987.

Brown was signed by the Los Angeles Raiders on August 20, 1987, and was released on August 27, 1987.

On October 2, 1987, Brown signed with the New York Giants during the 1987 NFL players strike. He started all three strike games for the Giants, totaling one interception and one fumble recovery. He was released on October 19 after the strike ended. Brown later re-signed with the team on December 23, 1987. Brown was projected to start in place of the injured Mark Collins during the team's regular season finale but Brown did not end up playing in the game. He was released on July 24, 1988.

Brown played in nine games for the Miami Hooters of the Arena Football League in 1994, recording 44 solo tackles, four assisted tackles, five interceptions, nine pass breakups, one forced fumble, and one fumble recovery. He was named second-team All-Arena as a defensive specialist for the 1994 season. The Hooters finished the year with a 5—7 record. He appeared in ten games in 1995, totaling four solo tackles, three assisted tackles, and one pass breakup.
