= Arizona Rattlers =

Arena football team

- Current season
- Logo
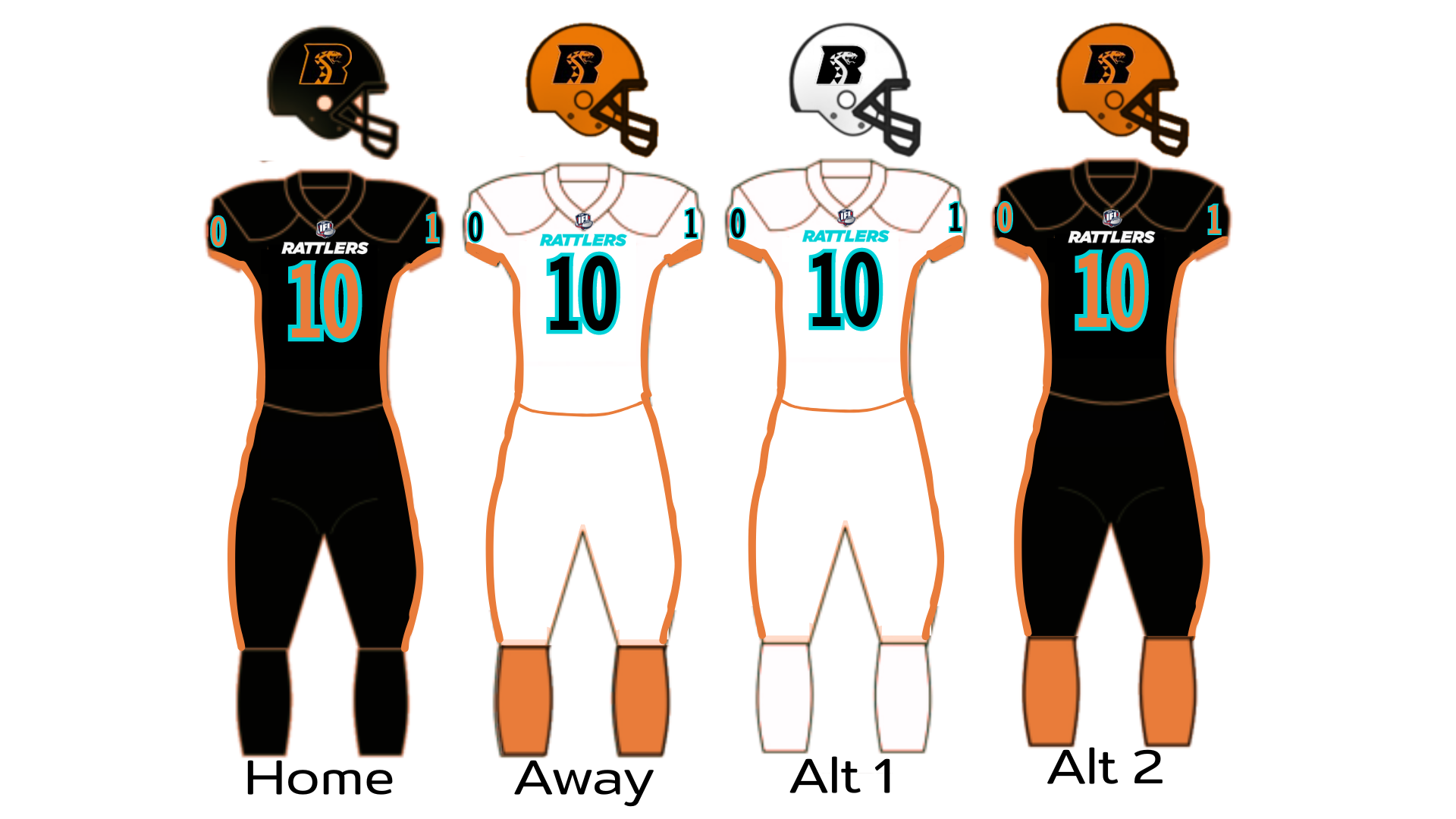
- Uniforms

General information
- Founded: 1991
- Headquartered: Desert Diamond Arena in Glendale, Arizona
- Colors: Black, Copper, Teal, White
- Mascot: Stryker
- Website: azrattlers.com

Personnel
- Owner: Ron Shurts
- General manager: Jeff Jarnigan
- Head coach: Kevin Guy
- President: Kevin Guy

Team history
- Arizona Rattlers (1992–present)

Home fields
- Footprint Center (1992–2023); Desert Diamond Arena (2024–present)

League / conference affiliations
- Arena Football League (1992–2016): American Conference (1992–2008); National Conference (2010–2016); West Division (1992–2015); Indoor Football League (2017–present): Intense Conference (2017–2021); Western Conference (2022–present)

Championships
- League championships: 8: ArenaBowl championships (5) 1994 (VIII), 1997 (XI), 2012 (XXV), 2013 (XXVI), 2014 (XXVII); United Bowl/IFL National Championships (3) 2017, 2024, 2026
- Conference championships: 10: AFL National: 2011, 2012, 2013, 2014, 2016; IFL Intense: 2017, 2019, 2021; IFL Western: 2024, 2026
- Division championships: 12: AFL West: 1996, 1997, 1998, 1999, 2004; AFL National: 2011, 2012, 2013, 2014, 2015; IFL Western: 2022, 2023

Playoff appearances (30)
- AFL: 1993, 1994, 1995, 1996, 1997, 1998, 1999, 2000, 2001, 2002, 2003, 2004, 2006, 2008, 2010, 2011, 2012, 2013, 2014, 2015, 2016; IFL: 2017, 2018, 2019, 2021, 2022, 2023, 2024, 2025, 2026

The Arizona Rattlers are a professional indoor American football team based in the Phoenix metropolitan area that competes in the Indoor Football League (IFL). The Rattlers were founded in 1992 as an expansion team in the Arena Football League (AFL) and were the third oldest active franchise in the AFL until their departure in 2016. They play their home games at Desert Diamond Arena in Glendale. They previously played at Footprint Center in downtown Phoenix.

The Rattlers are led by head coach Kevin Guy. Since the team's establishment in 1992, the Rattlers have won ten division titles and have played in nine ArenaBowl Championship games, winning championships in 1994, 1997, 2012, 2013, 2014. The Rattlers also won the 2017 United Bowl in their first season in the IFL.

It is believed that the Rattlers are the longest-tenured, continuously active indoor/arena team in the game's history being active for over 30 years (not counting the COVID-19 pandemic season cancelation in 2020).

== History ==
=== Founding (1991) ===
In 1987, it was speculated that the Phoenix, Arizona, area would be a target for the newly formed Arena Football League (AFL).

On September 11, 1991, it was announced that Jerry Colangelo had been awarded an expansion franchise in the AFL in Phoenix. Colangelo, owner of the NBA's Phoenix Suns, first approached Frank Kush to coach his team, but Kush declined the invitation. In October 1991, the team announced that former Dallas Cowboys quarterback Danny White would be the franchise's first head coach. In December 1991, the team announced that they would be named the Arizona Rattlers after more than 250 people suggested that the team's nickname should be the Rattlers, while 55% of their responders picked "Arizona" over "Phoenix".

=== Danny White era (1992–2004) ===
In 1992, the Rattlers began with their first two games on the road, and won their home debut in front of a sell-out crowd of 15,505 at America West Arena by a score of 56–31 over the Sacramento Attack.

In 1994, the Rattlers captured their first ArenaBowl championship, with a 36–31 victory over the Orlando Predators.

In 1997, the Rattlers won their second championship defeating the Iowa Barnstormers, led by future Super Bowl champion QB Kurt Warner, 55-33.

In December 1999, Gene Nudo, White and Will Meris pursued the purchase of the Rattlers from Colangelo.

=== Kevin Guy era (2008–present) ===
==== AFL (2008–2016) ====
In 2008, it was announced that Brett Bouchy would become the new owner of the Arizona Rattlers. After the Rattlers had a 4–12 record in 2007, Brett Bouchy hired Kevin Guy as the new Arizona Rattlers head coach in the 2008 season and the Rattlers improved to an 8–8 record and clinched a playoff berth for the first time since 2006, but lost in the first round.

In August 2009, numerous media outlets began reporting that the AFL was folding permanently and would file for Chapter 7 bankruptcy. The league released a statement on August 4 to the effect that while the league was not folding, it was suspending league operations indefinitely. Despite this, several of the league's creditors filed papers to force a Chapter 7 liquidation if the league did not do so voluntarily. This request was granted on August 7, though converted to a Chapter 11 reorganization on August 26. However, Brett Bouchy and a group of investors planned to launch a new league called Arena Football 1 and helped the Arizona Rattlers and the Orlando Predators to become two of the four teams to survive and return in 2010 with Arena Football 1.

In early 2010, it was announced that Arena Football 1 was granted the trademarks to the AFL brand and was renamed the Arena Football League. In 2011, after Brett Bouchy was able to keep both the Arizona Rattlers and the Orlando Predators alive, he was forced to let go of ownership to one of the teams that became the Arizona Rattlers.

On May 12, 2011, Ron Shurts became the new majority owner of the Rattlers franchise. In 2011, the Rattlers won 16 games in the regular season, a league record for wins in a single regular season. In the playoffs, by winning the National Conference championship, they clinched a berth in ArenaBowl XXIV. They lost the game to the Jacksonville Sharks when Jacksonville quarterback Aaron Garcia threw a game-winning touchdown pass on the game's final play. The Rattlers redeemed themselves the following season, winning ArenaBowl XXV over the Philadelphia Soul to win their first title in 15 years.

In 2013, the Rattlers and Soul met again in ArenaBowl XXVI, with the Rattlers winning yet again, 48–39. This made them the first team since 1995 to win back-to-back championships, and the first team in history to beat the same team for both titles.

In 2014, the Rattlers went 15–3 in the regular season after a 14-game winning streak to start the season, and defeated the Cleveland Gladiators in ArenaBowl XXVII by a score of 72–32, becoming the first team in AFL history to win three consecutive AFL championships since the Detroit Drive of 1988–1990, as well as establishing the largest margin of victory (40 points) in an ArenaBowl.

In 2015, the Rattlers went 14–4 in the regular season and made it to the Conference Championships but lost to the San Jose SaberCats 70–67, a team which had twice beaten them in the regular season. This ended their streak of consecutive ArenaBowl appearances at four.

In 2016, the Rattlers went 13–3 in the regular season, then blew out the Portland Steel and the Cleveland Gladiators en route to their fifth ArenaBowl appearance in six years, only to lose to the Philadelphia Soul.

==== IFL (2017–present) ====
On October 17, 2016, the Rattlers announced they had left the AFL and joined the Indoor Football League (IFL) for the 2017 season. Owner Ron Shurts said that it was possible that the AFL would have to go on hiatus in 2017, and was not sure the fans would return in 2018 if that happened. The move made Phoenix by far the largest market in the IFL. They made their IFL debut on February 17, 2017, at the defending six-time IFL Champions Sioux Falls Storm, but lost 40–29. On June 24, 2017, the Rattlers faced the Nebraska Danger in the Intense Conference Championship and won 62–36. They defeated the reigning champion Sioux Falls Storm 50–41 in the 2017 United Bowl on July 8, 2017.

On April 29, 2018, the Rattlers defeated the Cedar Rapids Titans 84–83 and earned their 300th win in franchise history. The Rattlers would go on to qualify for the 2018 playoffs, but lost to the Sioux Falls Storm in the Semifinals.

In 2019, the Rattlers went undefeated throughout the regular season, finishing with a 14–0 record. At the end of the season, their playoff games were moved to Gila River Arena (now Desert Diamond Arena) after the Talking Stick Resort Arena closed for renovations. The Rattlers lost (56-53) to the Sioux Falls Storm in the 2019 United Bowl, with coach Guy heavily blaming officiating. With Talking Stick Resort Arena planned to be closed through the 2020 season and possibly into the 2021 season, the Rattlers agreed to a lease at Gila River Arena in the interim.

After their 2020 season was canceled during the COVID-19 pandemic and the 2021 season was pushed back, the Rattlers announced they would be returning to downtown Phoenix for their 2021 season home games at Footprint Center, formerly known as Talking Stick Resort Arena.

In 2021, the Rattlers finished the regular season with a league best (12-2) record and entered the post season as the IFL's highest seed. They qualified for the 2021 United Bowl, advancing past their rivals, the Sioux Falls Storm and Duke City Gladiators. They lost in overtime to the Massachusetts Pirates.

After suffering their 2nd straight championship defeat, The Rattlers were determined to finish the 2022 season with much better results. They qualified for the post season once again, finishing the regular season as the top ranked seed in the Western Conference at (13-3). They advanced to the semifinals, but fell short yet again, losing to their in state rivals, and the eventual league champion Northern Arizona Wranglers.

The Rattlers entered their 2023 season, still chasing that elusive 7th franchise championship. They finished atop the Western Conference standings for the 2nd consecutive season with an (11-4) record. They lost in the playoffs again to the Northern Arizona Wranglers, this time in the opening round.

On November 6, 2023, it was announced that the Rattlers would be moving to Desert Diamond Arena, after originally planning to play there in 2020.

The Rattlers entered their 2024 offseason with much uncertainty. Five consecutive seasons without winning a championship resulted in heavy scrutiny of both Head coach Kevin Guy & his quarterback Drew Powell. Fans began questioning the duo's ability to finish in the playoffs. As a result, a major change was made. Coach Guy traded away his star quarterback to their in state rivals, the Tucson Sugar Skulls. In doing so, he filled the void at QB by acquiring local valley talent & current IFL Championship MVP Dalton Sneed from the defending 2023 champion Bay Area Panthers. The Rattlers took a gamble and began their 2024 season with a new leader under center. However, injuries plagued the team through the first four weeks, as they started the year with a disappointing 1–3 record. Fortunately, as the team grew healthier, so did their confidence. The Rattlers battled back throughout the year and finished the regular season with an (11-5) record.

They entered the playoffs as the number three seed in the Western Conference. A tightly contested first round matchup against the two seeded Vegas Knight Hawks resulted in a come from behind (39-38) road victory on the very last play of the game. Following the win, Coach Kevin Guy became the winningest coach in arena/indoor football history with 262 victories on July 27, 2024. The Rattlers advanced & hosted the 2024 Western Conference Championship, thanks to the San Diego Strike Force upsetting the top seeded Bay Area Panthers the week before. Arizona took full advantage, blowing out the visiting Strike Force (58-23) and securing the Western Conference crown. With the win, the Rattlers qualified for the 2024 IFL National Championship (known formerly as the United Bowl) at Lee's Family Forum in Henderson, Nevada. They faced off against the Eastern Conference Champion Massachusetts Pirates once again. This time, they would not be denied their quest for a seventh franchise championship. The Rattlers blew out the Pirates, shutting them out 29–0 in the first half, and winning the game (53-16). Following their historic win, the Rattlers avenged their previous United Bowl defeat to Massachusetts and secured their 7th team championship as the 2024 IFL Champions. Davontae Merriweather was named the game's MVP with 3 key interceptions.

The Rattlers began their 2025 season, defending their title with a strong 4-0 start. However, they dropped their first game of the year to the Tucson Sugar Skulls before rattling off another 3 straight wins to improve to (7-1) on the year. Their momentum was halted however, after they'd lose the next 4 games and dropped to a disappointing (7-5) record. Their 2025 season was beginning to unravel & was quickly headed in the wrong direction. For the first time in over a decade, their consecutive streak of playoff appearances was now in jeopardy. Thankfully, the Snakes bounced back & finished the regular season with a (10-6) record, while also securing a home playoff game against the visiting San Diego Strike Force. After both teams traded scores throughout the contest, The Rattlers appeared in position to advance with a (48-41) lead. However, the game ended in controversy, after the Strike Force found the end zone for the win when time had initially expired before the final snap & a flag for a 10 second run off penalty was reviewed & reversed by the officials. In heartbreaking fashion, the Rattlers season ended after a (48-49) loss to the Strike Force, following an extra point play. Immediately following the game, Rattlers Head coach Kevin Guy sent an official appeal to the league's office for review. The league determined that an error was in fact made by the officials, but would not reverse the final result of the game. Following the decision, coach Kevin Guy said in a season closing press conference that their would be "consequences" to the league for the upheld result.

In the off-season, Coach Guy decided to take a gamble & build a younger roster for the 2026 IFL season. Quarterback Dalton Sneed stepped away from football & Drew Powell was re-signed to the team. The Rattlers also went out & obtained Free Agent Quarterback Max Meylor from the 2025 Eastern Conference Champion Green Bay Blizzard. Meylor joined the Rattlers seeking redemption, after he & his team were stopped a yard shy of winning a title by the eventual champion Vegas Knight Hawks. Together, Max & the Rattlers both sought to avenge a bitter ending to their 2025 seasons. The Snakes began their year by securing an impressive season opening win against the visiting San Diego Strike Force by a score of (49-27). However, adversity struck the team the following week, as the Fishers Freight beat them convincingly, (42-63). Arizona would respond by winning their next 3 games & improving their record to (4-1) on the season. Unfortunately, their next big setback was facing the defending champion Knight Hawks.They dropped both regular season meetings with them, one of which was in the newly formed in season tournament championship game... the "IFL Cup" held at the American Dream (shopping mall) in East Rutherford, New Jersey. By mid season, the Rattlers found themselves sputtering & falling behind the Knight Hawks & Strike Force in the Western Conference standings. Things kept trending worse for them, after the Rattlers lost again to the Fishers Freight & the Tucson Sugar Skulls in back to back weeks. The Rats held a dismal (7-5) record & were on the cusp of missing the post season. With their season hanging in the balance, the team was in desperate need of some quick momentum. Fortunately, Arizona delivered by winning their next 4 games & rallying to finish the regular season as the Western Conference's #3 seed at (11-5).

The Rattlers entered familiar territory in the playoffs, as they went up against the #2 seeded Knight Hawks on the road for the 3rd time that season. This time however, they upended the defending champs when it mattered most, knocking out Vegas (47-36) & advancing to a Western Conference championship showdown with the #1 seeded Strike Force. The Rattlers avenged their 2025 playoff defeat, as their defense stifled the San Diego offense & they hung on to beat the Strike Force (43-37). With the close victory, the resilient Rattlers punched their tickets to the 2026 IFL National Championship at the Tucson Convention Center in Tucson, Arizona. Arizona returned to the IFL's championship game for the 5th time since joining the league in 2017. They faced off against the back to back Eastern Conference Champion Green Bay Blizzard. With the matchup locked in, the stage was set for an instant classic between the IFL Juggernauts. It was Arizona's #1 ranked defense vs Green Bay's #1 ranked offense. Ironically enough, the one thing standing between QB Max Meylor & his pursuit of an IFL championship, was his former team.

The Blizzard entered the game as early favorites, having shown to be the most consistent team throughout the regular season with a (13-3) record. To start the game, Green Bay's kicker Andrew Mevis launched the opening kickoff through the goalposts to give the Blizzard a "Deuce" & an early 2 point advantage. Nerves set in quickly for Arizona, as they turned the ball over on their first possession. Green Bay took advantage of good field position & cashed in for a quick score to jump out to an early (9-0) lead. Despite the early deficit, Arizona was not rattled. Meylor calmly lead his team down field and punched it in for the Rattlers first score of the game to make it (9-7). However, Green Bay's QB Liam Thompson fired back as the Blizzard found the end zone again and made the score (16-7). On their next possession, Arizona scored again & also earned a "Deuce" of their own from the ensuing kickoff to make up the two points and tie the game at (16-16). They traded scores 1 more time before entering the half tied up at (23-23). The teams went back & forth throughout the 3rd quarter, until a timely 4th down defensive stop finally gave the Rattlers a chance to take the lead. Arizona capitalized as QB Max Meylor rumbled into the endzone for an 11 yard rush to give his team a (39-32) lead. Momentum had shifted as it was Green Bay's offense now chasing the game. Midway through the 4th quarter, QB Liam Thompson handed off to Trevon Alexander for a 4 yard touchdown score to make it (46-45) pending the extra point. However, a costly Special Teams error, forced a high snap over the kicker's head & rolled down field with several players attempting to grab the loose ball before the Rattlers recovered & took it in the other way for 2 points. The 3 point swing now gave the Rattlers a (48-45) advantage & momentum. With possession & the lead, Arizona made them pay, as Meylor found the Endzone to give his team a comfortable (55-45) lead late. Green Bay tried to respond with another score & a two point conversion but failed to convert. With a championship in reach, the Rattlers offense scored once more to give them a decisive (62-51) lead. Their secondary put the finishing touches on the game, after Blizzard QB Liam Thompson fumbled away the ball on their final possession of the game. With the thrilling victory, the Arizona Rattlers earned their 8th franchise championship in their 25 year history & finished the year as the 2026 IFL Champions.

After the game's conclusion, Coach Kevin Guy summarized his team's triumph by referring to his previous year's statement when saying there would be "consequences" for the questionable ending in the 2025 playoffs. As a result, he recorded his 6th team championship & first ever won at "home" since taking over as the Rattlers Head Coach in 2008. Quarterback Max Meylor was named the game's MVP with 103 yards passing & 5 Touchdowns.

== Players of note ==
=== Arena Football Hall of Famers ===
Arizona Rattlers in the Arena Football Hall of Fame
Players
No.	Name	Positions	Seasons	Inducted
14	Hunkie Cooper	WR/LB	1993–2007	2011
13	Sherdrick Bonner	QB	1993–2007	2012
17	Randy Gatewood	WR/LB	1996–2007	2012
44	Bob McMillen	FB/LB	1995–2000	2013
Coaches and executives
Name		Positions	Seasons	Inducted
Danny White		HC	1994–2002	2002
Gene Nudo		VP/GM/HC	1993–2007	2011

=== Indoor Football League Hall of Famers ===
No Rattler player has been inducted into the Indoor Football League Hall of Fame.

=== Retired numbers ===
Arizona Rattlers retired numbers
No.	Player	Position(s)	Tenure	Retired
13	Sherdrick Bonner	QB	1993–2007	June 16, 2010
14	Hunkie Cooper	WR/LB	1993–2005	May 6, 2005
17	Randy Gatewood	WR/DB	1996–2007	May 9, 2008

=== Ring of Honor ===
Arizona Rattlers Ring of Honor
Year	No.	Name	Position(s)	Tenure
2013	13	Sherdrick Bonner	QB	1993–2007
2013	14	Hunkie Cooper	WR/LB	1993–2005
2013	17	Randy Gatewood	WR/DB	1996–2007
2018	77	Anttaj Hawthorne	DL	2008, 2010–2016
2025	10	Nick Davila	QB	2010–2016

=== Individual awards ===
AFL MVP
Season	Player	Position
1993	Hunkie Cooper	WR/LB
2011	Nick Davila	QB
2014	Nick Davila	QB
2016	Nick Davila	QB

AFL Offensive Player of the Year
Season	Player	Position
1998	Calvin Schexnayder	OS
2014	Nick Davila	QB

AFL Ironman of the Year
Season	Player	Position
1999	Hunkie Cooper	WR/LB
2000	Hunkie Cooper	WR/LB
2003	Randy Gatewood	WR/DB
2006	Randy Gatewood	WR/DB

AFL Rookie of the Year
Season	Player	Position
2010	Rod Windsor	WR

ArenaBowl MVP Winners
ArenaBowl	Player	Position
VIII	Sherdrick Bonner	QB
XI	Donnie Davis	QB
XXV	Nick Davila	QB
XXVI	Rod Windsor	WR
XXVII	Nick Davila	QB

Offensive Lineman of the Year
Season	Player	Position
2012	Kyle Young	OL
2013	Billy Eisenhardt	OL
2016	Jordan Mudge	OL

Kicker Player of the Year
Season	Player	Position
2013	Garrett Lindholm	K

Defensive Back of the Year
Season	Player	Position
2014	Marquis Floyd	DB
2015	Jeremy Kellem	DB

IFL Defensive Player of the Year
Season	Player	Position
2019	Davontae Merriweather	DB
2021	Dillon Winfrey	DB

IFL Offensive Player of the Year
Season	Player	Position
2018	Darrell Monroe	RB

IFL Offensive Rookie of the Year
Season	Player	Position
2018	Jeff Ziemba	QB

IFL MVP
Season	Player	Position
2021	Drew Powell	QB

=== All-Arena players ===
The following Rattlers players have been named to All-Arena Teams:

- QB Sherdrick Bonner (5), Nick Davila (5)
- FB Odie Armstrong (2), Mykel Benson (1)
- FB/LB Bob McMillen (2)
- WR Rod Windsor (6), Maurice Purify (1)
- WR/DB Cedric Tillman (1), Randy Gatewood (6)
- WR/LB Hunkie Cooper (4)
- OL Kyle Young (2), Brennen Carvalho (1), Michael Huey (3), Billy Eisenhardt (1), Jordan Mudge (1)
- DL Anttaj Hawthorne (2), Clifford Dukes (1), Mike McAdoo (1), Damien Borel (1), Dimetrio Tyson (1)
- OL/DL Doc Wise (1), Bryan Henderson (1)
- LB Tyre Glasper (3)
- DB Virgil Gray (2), Arkeith Brown (2), Marquis Floyd (1), Jeremy Kellem (1)
- K Fabrizio Scaccia (1), Garrett Lindholm (1)
- OS Hunkie Cooper (2), Calvin Schexnayder (2), Chris Horn (1)
- DS Cecil Doggette (1)
- KR Virgil Gray (1)

=== All-IFL players ===
The following Rattlers players have been named to All-IFL Teams:

- QB Drew Powell (2)
- RB Darrell Monroe (1)
- WR Jerrod Harrington (1), Jarrod Harrington (1), Braxton Haley (1)
- OL Lamar Mady (3), Damian Love (1), Steven Gurrola (1), Kenny Thomas (1)
- DL Chris McAllister (1), Nikolaus D'Avanzo (1), Lance McDowell (1)
- LB Treyvon Williams (1)
- LB/DB Davontae Merriweather (1)
- DB Allen Chapman (2), Davontae Merriweather (1), Dillon Winfrey (2), Tyrell Pearson (1)
- K Sawyer Petre (1), Jimmy Camacho (1), Ernesto Lacayo (1)

=== All-Ironman players ===
The following Rattlers players have been named to All-Ironman Teams:

- WR/DB Randy Gatewood (2)
- WR/LB Hunkie Cooper (3)
- OL/DL Stacy Evans (1), Wendall Gaines (2)

=== All-Rookie players ===
The following Rattlers players have been named to All-Rookie Teams:

- QB Chad May
- WR Tandon Harvey
- WR/LB Chris Horn
- OL/DL Stacy Evans, Wendall Gaines, Bryan Henderson

== Notable coaches ==
=== Head coaches ===
Note: Statistics are accurate through the end of the 2024 IFL season.

#	Name	Tenure	Regular season				Playoffs				Achievements
#	Name	Tenure	G	W	L	Pct.	G	W	L	Pct.	Achievements
1	Danny White^{†}	1992–2004	176	121	55	.688	30	20	10	.667	2× ArenaBowl Championships (VIII, XI); AFL Coach of the Year (1993)
2	Todd Shell	2005	16	7	9	.438	–	–	–	–	
3	Gene Nudo^{†}	2006–2007	32	12	20	.375	2	1	1	.500	
4	Kevin Guy	2008–present^{§}	243	188	55	.774	33	23	10	.697	3× ArenaBowl Championships (XXV, XXVI, XXVII); United Bowl Championship (2017); IFL National Championship (2024); 2× AFL Coach of the Year (2011, 2016); IFL Coach of the Year (2021)

== Team ownership ==
The Arizona Rattlers introduced Ron Shurts as the team's new majority owner on May 12, 2011.

"I have been an Arizona Rattlers season ticket holder since day one and attended the first Arizona Rattlers game at America West Arena. I believe in the team and the Arena Football League," said Shurts. "I want to bring the passion and excitement for Rattlers football back to US Airways Center and the Valley."

"Downtown Phoenix continues to grow and the Rattlers will be an integral part of the affordable, family-fun entertainment that the Suns and the Mercury are providing the local community," Shurts added.

== Season-by-season ==
(#)	The order of league championship won by the franchise
Finish	Final position in league, division, or conference
T-#	Finished tied in that position with one or more teams
	ArenaBowl champions (1992–2016)
	IFL National Champions (2017–present)
	Conference champions
	Division champions
	Wild Card berth

Season	Team	League	Conference	Division	Regular season				Postseason results	Head coaches
Season	Team	League	Conference	Division	Finish	W	L	Pct	Postseason results	Head coaches
Arizona Rattlers
1992	1992	AFL		Western	3rd	4	6	.400		Danny White
1993	1993	AFL	American		2nd	7	5	.583	Won Quarterfinals (at Rage) 56–49; Lost Semifinals (at Drive) 34–38	Danny White
1994	1994	AFL	American		T-2nd	8	4	.667	Won Quarterfinals (Rage) 52–24; Won Semifinals (at Firebirds) 40–33; Won ArenaBowl VIII (1) (at Predators) 36–31	Danny White
1995	1995	AFL	American	Western	2nd	7	5	.583	Lost Quarterfinals (Barnstormers) 52–56	Danny White
1996	1996	AFL	American	Western	1st	11	3	.786	Won Quarterfinals (Predators) 65–48; Lost Semifinals (at Storm) 54–55	Danny White
1997	1997	AFL	American	Western	1st	12	2	.857	Won Quarterfinals (Mustangs) 46–29; Won Semifinals (Storm) 49–46^{(OT)} Won ArenaBowl XI (2) (vs. Barnstormers) 55–33	Danny White
1998	1998	AFL	American	Western	1st	10	4	.714	Won Quarterfinals (Thunderbears) 50–36; Lost Semifinals (Predators) 33–38	Danny White
1999	1999	AFL	American	Western	1st	10	4	.714	Won Quarterfinals (Kats) 34–30; Lost Semifinal (at Firebirds) 47–73	Danny White
2000	2000	AFL	American	Western	2nd	12	2	.857	Won Wild Card Round (Destroyers) 41–34; Won Quarterfinals (at Firebirds) 53–50; Lost Semifinals (at Predators) 44–56	Danny White
2001	2001	AFL	American	Western	2nd	8	6	.571	Won Wild Card Round (Fury) 52–44; Lost Quarterfinals (at SaberCats) 49–68	Danny White
2002	2002	AFL	American	Western	2nd	11	3	.786	Won Quarterfinals (Cobras) 61–59; Won Semifinals (Rush) 46–35; Lost ArenaBowl XVI (at SaberCats) 14–52	Danny White
2003	2003	AFL	American	Western	3rd	10	6	.625	Won Wild Card Round (Gladiators) 69–26; Won Quarterfinals (at Avengers) 70–63; Won Semifinals (at SaberCats) 66–49; Lost ArenaBowl XVII (at Storm) 29–43	Danny White
2004	2004	AFL	American	Western	1st	11	5	.688	Won Quarterfinals (Avengers) 59–42; Won Semifinals (Crush) 45–41; Lost ArenaBowl XVIII (vs. SaberCats) 62–69	Danny White
2005	2005	AFL	American	Western	4th	7	9	.438		Todd Shell
2006	2006	AFL	American	Western	2nd	8	8	.500	Won Wild Card playoffs (Blaze) 57–34; Lost Divisional playoffs (at SaberCats) 48–62	Gene Nudo
2007	2007	AFL	American	Western	4th	4	12	.250		Gene Nudo
2008	2008	AFL	American	Western	2nd	8	8	.500	Lost Wild Card playoffs (Rampage) 41–48	Kevin Guy
2009	2009	AFL	Did not play; league suspended operations							Kevin Guy
2010	2010	AFL	National	West	2nd	10	6	.625	Lost National Conference Semifinals (at Shock) 49–57	Kevin Guy
2011	2011	AFL	National	West	1st	16	2	.889	Won National Conference Semifinals (Shock) 62–33; Won National Conference Championship (Rush) 54–48; Lost ArenaBowl XXIV (vs. Sharks) 70–73	Kevin Guy
2012	2012	AFL	National	West	1st	13	5	.722	Won National Conference Semifinals (SaberCats) 51–48; Won National Conference Championship (Blaze) 75–69; Won ArenaBowl XXV (3) (at Soul) 72–54	Kevin Guy
2013	2013	AFL	National	West	1st	15	3	.833	Won National Conference Semifinals (SaberCats) 59–49; Won National Conference Championship (Shock) 65–57; Won ArenaBowl XXVI (4) (vs. Soul) 48–39	Kevin Guy
2014	2014	AFL	National	West	1st	15	3	.833	Won National Conference Semifinals (Thunder) 52–48; Won National Conference Championship (SaberCats) 72–56; Won ArenaBowl XXVII (5) (at Gladiators) 72–32	Kevin Guy
2015	2015	AFL	National	West	1st	14	4	.778	Won National Conference Semifinals (Shock) 72–41; Lost National Conference Championship (at SaberCats) 67–70	Kevin Guy
2016	2016	AFL	National		1st	13	3	.813	Won National Conference Semifinals (Steel) 84–40; Won National Conference Championship (Gladiators) 82–41; Lost ArenaBowl XXIX (vs. Soul) 42–56	Kevin Guy
2017	2017	IFL	Intense		1st	12	4	.750	Won Intense Conference Championship (Danger) 62–36; Won 2017 United Bowl (6) (vs. Storm) 50–41	Kevin Guy
2018	2018	IFL			2nd	11	3	.786	Lost Semifinals (Storm) 68–69^{(OT)}	Kevin Guy
2019	2019	IFL			1st	14	0	1.000	Won Intense Conference Championship (Danger) 62–45; Lost 2019 United Bowl (vs. Storm) 53–56	Kevin Guy
2020	2020	IFL	Did not play; season cancelled due to COVID-19 pandemic							Kevin Guy
2021	2021	IFL			1st	12	2	.857	Won Round One (Storm) 69–42; Won Western Conference Championship (Gladiators) 58–55; Lost 2021 United Bowl (vs. Pirates) 34–37	Kevin Guy
2022	2022	IFL	Western		1st	13	3	.813	Won Round One (Gladiators) 53–14; Lost Western Conference Championship (Wranglers) 51–52	Kevin Guy
2023	2023	IFL	Western		1st	11	4	.733	Lost Round One (Wranglers) 53–62	Kevin Guy
2024	2024	IFL	Western		3rd	11	5	.688	Won Quarterfinals (at Knight Hawks) 39–38; Won Western Conference Championship (Strike Force) 58–23; Won 2024 IFL National Championship (7) (vs. Pirates) 53–16	Kevin Guy
2025	2025	IFL	Western		2nd	10	6	1.000	Lost Round One (Strike Force) 48–49	Kevin Guy
2026	2026	IFL	Western		3rd	11	5	.688	Won Quarterfinals (at Knight Hawks) 47–36; Won Western Conference Championship (at Strike Force) 43–37; Won 2026 IFL National Championship (8) (vs. Blizzard) 62–51	Kevin Guy
AFL/IFL total						349	150	(includes only regular season)		
AFL/IFL total						47	22	(includes only the postseason)		
AFL/IFL total						396	172	(includes both regular season and postseason)		

== Media ==
=== 1992–1995 ===
The first broadcaster of the Rattlers was KUTP UPN-45. They would televise home & away games, whichever games were not picked up by ESPN, to include playoff games.

=== 1996–2003 ===
KASW-TV WB6 WB61 took over broadcasting the Rattlers.

=== 2004–2008 ===
Starting in the 2004 season, the Arizona Rattlers partnered with FOX Sports Arizona (now Bally Sports Arizona). That first season, they televised 4 games. When the 2005 season came, the Arena Football League announced a partnership with FOX Sports Regional Networks to televise games regionally. In addition, the Arizona Rattlers announced they would also produce games with FOX Sports Arizona separate from the League contract.

=== 2010 ===
After the cancellation of the 2009 season and return of the Arena Football League. The Arizona Rattlers announced a new broadcast deal with KAZT-TV AZTV 7 to broadcast up to eight games of the 2010 season. The partnership ended after one season after KAZT would not renew their broadcast partnership with the Rattlers in the 2011 season.

=== 2011 ===
After major changes of ownership throughout the 2011 season the Arizona Rattlers announced a new broadcast deal in mid season to return to FOX Sports Arizona with some games carried on FOX Sports Arizona Plus.

=== 2012–2014 ===
As the 2012 season approached the Arizona Rattlers would again announce that they would be moving their broadcasts to a new home this time to Cox7 Arizona with longtime Arizona sports caster Kevin Ray and Dale Hellestrae calling the game in the booth with Chris Harris on the sidelines and Lindsay Smith on Social Media. Cox7 was known as the Rattlers best broadcaster by televising all nine of their home games including selected away games that were simulcasted to other teams broadcasts. Cox7 also did Pregame Shows with the Rattlers before every home game showing documentaries and Talking LIVE before the game. The Partnership became a major success for Cox7 the Arizona Rattlers later extended their contract with Cox7 through the 2014 season when the announcement was made in November 2012.

=== 2015–2016 ===
After the major success with Cox7 Arizona, the Rattlers would not renew with the station after their contract expired in the 2014 season and announced they would move their broadcasts back to FOX Sports Arizona, broadcasting up to only 3 home games and one playoff game on FOX Sports Arizona Plus. However, the Rattlers still carried over the same broadcast team from Cox7 Arizona with Kevin Ray, Dale Hellestrae and Chris Harris calling the game. The Rattlers were also seen on National broadcasts on ESPN2 and CBS Sports Network until 2016 when they left the AFL.

=== 2017–2018 ===
All Indoor Football League games are streamed live on YouTube. Their games were also still aired on FOX Sports Arizona and FOX Sports Arizona Plus.

=== 2019 ===
In 2019, Arizona Rattlers aired all home games on The CW Phoenix for the 2019 season. The 2019 United Bowl, which was being hosted by the Arizona Rattlers, was televised by FOX Sports Arizona Plus. All Arizona Rattlers games were also streamed on YouTube.

=== 2021 ===
In 2021, Rattler home games began airing on KPHE-TV LATV 44 in Phoenix with Floyd Simmons and Sherdrick Bonner on play-by-play and Joe Pequeno as sideline reporter. All games continue to be streamed on YouTube. All games are also being broadcast on the radio on KQFN The Fanatic AM 1580, FM 99.3 and FM 95.9. All telecasts were produced by Simmons Media Group.

=== 2022 ===
In 2022, the Arizona Rattlers broadcasts returned to YurView (Formerly Cox7 Arizona), with Floyd Simmons and Sherdrick Bonner continuing to call the games along with Joe Pequeno sideline reporting. All telecasts continued to be produced by Simmons Media Group. Also during the 2022 season, YurView became the new official broadcast home for the Tucson Sugar Skulls. Marking the first time ever the Rattlers and Sugar Skulls telecasts air on the same TV station.
