= 1994 Arena Football League season =

- League: Arena Football League
- Sport: Arena football
- Duration: May 20, 1994 – August 13, 1994

Regular season
- Season MVP: Eddie Brown, ALB

League postseason
- Semifinals champions: Orlando Predators
- Semifinals runners-up: Massachusetts Marauders
- Semifinals champions: Arizona Rattlers
- Semifinals runners-up: Albany Firebirds

ArenaBowl VIII
- Champions: Arizona Rattlers
- Runners-up: Orlando Predators

AFL seasons
- ← 1993 1995 →

American, National

The 1994 Arena Football League season was the eighth season of the Arena Football League (AFL). The league champions were the Arizona Rattlers, who defeated the Orlando Predators in ArenaBowl VIII.

== Team movement ==
Three expansion teams joined the league: the Fort Worth Cavalry, Las Vegas Sting, and the Milwaukee Mustangs.

Meanwhile, the Cincinnati Rockers and the Dallas Texans folded and the Detroit Drive relocated to Massachusetts to become the Massachusetts Marauders. The Denver Dynamite remained inactive.

== Standings ==
1994 Arena Football League standings
Team	Overall			Conference			Scoring				
Team	W	L	PCT	W	L	PCT	PF	PA	PF (Avg.)	PA (Avg.)	STK
American Conference
xy-Albany Firebirds	10	2	.833	5	1	.833	642	507	53.5	42.25	W 2
x-Arizona Rattlers	8	4	.667	5	1	.833	525	441	43.75	36.75	W 1
x-Massachusetts Marauders	8	4	.667	6	1	.857	586	504	48.83	42	W 1
x-Las Vegas Sting	5	7	.417	2	5	.286	372	484	31	40.3	L 1
Cleveland Thunderbolts	2	10	.167	1	5	.167	445	548	37.08	45.67	L 2
Milwaukee Mustangs	0	12	.000	0	6	.000	386	609	32.16	50.75	L 12
National Conference
xyz-Orlando Predators	11	1	.917	4	1	.800	579	341	48.25	28.42	L 1
x-Tampa Bay Storm	7	5	.583	4	2	.667	561	564	46.75	47	W 1
x-Charlotte Rage	5	7	.417	2	4	.333	442	503	36.83	42.42	L 1
x-Fort Worth Cavalry	5	7	.417	3	2	.600	556	490	36.66	41.92	W 1
Miami Hooters	5	7	.417	1	5	.167	388	491	32.3	40.92	W 1

== Playoffs ==
Quarterfinals
1	Orlando	34
8	Fort Worth	14
4	Massachusetts	58
5	Tampa Bay	51
2	Albany	49
7	Las Vegas	30
3	Arizona	52
6	Charlotte	24

Semifinals
1	Orlando	51
4	Massachusetts	42
2	Albany	33
3	Arizona	40

ArenaBowl VIII
1	Orlando	31
3	Arizona	36

== All-Arena team ==
Position	First team	Second team
Quarterback	Ben Bennett, Orlando	Mike Perez, Albany
Fullback/Linebacker	Paul McGowan, Orlando	Tony Burse, Massachusetts
Wide receiver/Defensive back	Barry Wagner, Orlando	Cedric Tillman, Arizona
Wide receiver/Linebacker	Bruce LaSane, Miami	Niu Sale, Massachusetts
Offensive specialist	Eddie Brown, Albany	Khevin Pratt, Charlotte
Offensive lineman/Defensive lineman	Webbie Burnett, Orlando; Robert Stewart, Charlotte; Dannie Lockett, Massachusetts	D'artagain Wise, Arizona; Ralph Jarvis, Massachusetts; Rusty Russell, Orlando
Defensive specialist	Carlton Johnson, Las Vegas; Durwood Roquemore, Orlando	Riley Ware, Massachusetts; Donald Brown, Miami
Kicker	Jorge Cimadevilla, Orlando	Franco Grilla, Albany
