= ArenaBowl VIII =

Annual league championship game

Arizona Rattlers (3rd)	Orlando Predators (1st)
36	31
	1	2	3	4	Total
ARI	7	13	7	9	36
ORL	10	7	7	7	31
- Date: September 2, 1994
- Stadium: Amway Arena; Orlando, Florida
- MVP: Sherdrick Bonner, QB, Arizona: Barry Wagner, WR/DB, Orlando (Ironman of the Game)
- Attendance: 14,368
- Winning coach: Danny White
- Losing coach: Perry Moss

TV in the United States
- Network: ESPN
- Announcers: Tom Mees, Rick 'Doc' Walker

ArenaBowl VIII was the Arena Football League's eighth ArenaBowl. The game featured the #3 Arizona Rattlers (8–4) of the American Conference against the #1 Orlando Predators (11–1) of the National Conference. The Rattlers were making their first ArenaBowl appearance in their three-year history, while the Predators were in their second ArenaBowl in their four years in the league (having lost to the Detroit Drive in ArenaBowl VI).

Arena Bowl VIII was the first to use a roman numeral in its name (a la the Super Bowl); all previous games used a shortened version of the year in which it was played (such as ArenaBowl '93).

== Game summary ==
In the first quarter, Orlando struck first with Ben Bennett completing a 5-yard TD pass to Alex Shell, while Arizona responded with Sherdrick Bonner completing a 33-yard touchdown pass to Cedric Tillman. The Predators wrapped up the first quarter with Jorge Cimadevilla making a 24-yard Field Goal.

In the second quarter, the Rattlers took the lead with Bonner completing a 6-yard TD pass to Calvin "Shakes" Schexnayder, but the Predators retook the lead with Bennett and Shell hooking up again on a 42-yard touchdown pass. Arizona regained the lead before halftime with Luis Zendejas kicking two field goals, a 23-yarder and a 40-yarder.

In the third quarter, the Rattlers increased its lead with Bonner's 2-yard touchdown pass to Milton Vaughn; Orlando responded with Bennett's 38-yard touchdown pass to Herkie Walls.

In the fourth quarter, Arizona added on to its lead with Zendejas kicking a 21-yard field goal, yet the Predators retook the lead with WR-DB Barry Wagner's 4-yard touchdown run. The Rattlers regained the lead with Bonner and Schexnayder hooking up again on a 24-yard touchdown pass, but the following two-point conversion failed. In the final seconds, Bennett threw a deep ball to try to get a touchdown in order to take the lead for good, but it ended up incomplete.

With the win, the Arizona Rattlers won their very first ArenaBowl in franchise history.

== Scoring summary ==
1st Quarter

- ORL – Shell 5-yard pass from Bennett (Cimadevilla kick)
- ARI – Tillman 33-pass from Bonner (Zendejas kick)
- ORL – 24-yard FG Cimadevilla

2nd Quarter

- ARI – Schexnayder 6-yard pass from Bonner (Zendejas kick)
- ORL – Shell 42-yard pass from Bennett (Cimadevilla kick)
- ARI – 23-yard FG Zendejas
- ARI – 40-yard FG Zendejas

3rd Quarter

- ARI – Vaughn 2-yard pass from Bonner (Czyzewski kick)
- ORL – Walls 38-yard pass from Bennett (Langeloh kick)

4th Quarter

- ARI – 21-yard FG Zendejas
- ORL – Wagner 4-yard run (Cimadevilla kick)
- ARI – Schexnayder 24-yard pass from Bonner (Zendejas drop kick failed)

== Trivia ==
- On the Arena Football League's 20 Greatest Highlights Countdown, this game was ranked #14.
- The Orlando Predators were favored by 16 points.
