= 2007 Columbus Destroyers season =

Arena Football League team season

- Head coach: Doug Kay
- Home stadium: Nationwide Arena

Results
- Record: 7–9
- Division place: 3rd
- Playoffs: L ArenaBowl XXI 33-55 vs. San Jose

The 2007 Columbus Destroyers season is the 9th season for the franchise and the 4th in Columbus, Ohio. They finished with a 7–9 record and qualified for the playoffs. The Destroyers defeated the Tampa Bay Storm 56–55 in the first round. The Destroyers advanced to the National Conference Championship by beating Dallas 66–59 in Dallas the following week. Columbus swept the table with the top three National Conference teams by defeating the Georgia Force 66–56 to win the National Conference Championship Game, their first in team history their history and advance to ArenaBowl XXI, their first ArenaBowl. In ArenaBowl XXI, the Destroyers lost to the San Jose SaberCats 33-55.

== Coaching ==
Doug Kay started his second season as head coach of the Destroyers.

== Season schedule ==
Week	Date	Opponent	Home/Away	Result
1	March 1	Nashville Kats	Away	W 58–56
2	March 9	New Orleans VooDoo	Away	L 52–45
3		Bye Week		
4	March 24	Chicago Rush	Home	L 55–47
5	March 30	Georgia Force	Home	W 62–61
6	April 5	Dallas Desperados	Away	L 53–51
7	April 14	Austin Wranglers	Home	W 72–49
8	April 23	Philadelphia Soul	Home	W 44–21
9	April 29	Tampa Bay Storm	Away	L 34–32
10	May 4	New York Dragons	Home	W 51–42
11	May 11	Grand Rapids Rampage	Home	W 59–56
12	May 18	Colorado Crush	Away	L 58–40
13	May 26	Dallas Desperados	Home	L 56–47
14	June 2	Georgia Force	Away	L 54–33
15	June 8	Kansas City Brigade	Home	L 47–34
16	June 16	Philadelphia Soul	Away	L 56–53
17	June 23	New York Dragons	Away	W 74–43

== Playoff schedule ==
Round	Date	Opponent	Home/Away	Result
1st	June 30	(3) Tampa Bay Storm	Away	W 56–55
2nd	July 7	(1) Dallas Desperados	Away	W 66–59
3rd	July 14	(2) Georgia Force	Away	W 66–56
ArenaBowl XXI	July 29	(1) San Jose SaberCats	Neutral	L 33–55

=== 2007 roster ===
2007 Columbus Destroyers roster
Quarterbacks: 12 Scott Dreisbach; 1 Matt Nagy; Fullbacks: Currently vacant; Wide receivers: Currently vacant	Offensive linemen: Currently vacant; Defensive linemen: Currently vacant	Linebackers: Currently vacant; Defensive backs: Currently vacant; Kickers: Currently vacant	Injured reserve: Currently vacant; Other league exempt: Currently vacant; League suspension: Currently vacant; Refused to report: Currently vacant; Inactive reserve: Currently vacant; Recallable reassignment: Currently vacant; Rookies in italics Roster updated March 11, 2019; 28 Active, 0 Inactive

== Stats ==
=== Offense ===
==== Quarterback ====
Player	Comp.	Att.	Comp%	Yards	TD's	INT's	Long	Rating
Matt Nagy	341	545	62.6	3557	75	15	44	104.4
Scott Dreisbach	30	45	66.7	269	5	2	37	91.8

==== Running backs ====
Player	Car.	Yards	Avg.	TD's	Long
Harold Wells	73	197	2.7	13	13
Damien Groce	16	80	5	3	14
B. J. Barre	8	34	4.3	2	16
Matt Nagy	16	22	1.4	6	6
Josh Bush	4	19	4.8	2	9
Brad Greetis	6	4	.8	2	4
Darcy Levy	1	5	5	0	5
Freddie Solomon	1	5	5	0	5

==== Wide receivers ====
Player	Rec.	Yards	Avg.	TD's	Long
Damien Groce	118	1342	11.4	26	44
David Saunders	68	550	8.1	18	25
Marcus Knight	44	496	11.3	9	24
Josh Bush	48	461	9.6	6	33
B. J. Barre	22	291	13.2	7	45
Jason Shelley	25	264	10.6	1	23
Freddie Solomon	24	226	9.4	3	21
Darcy Levy	7	105	15	2	28
Harold Wells	11	90	8.2	4	20
Matthew Thomas	7	68	9.7	2	16
Cole Magner	4	44	11	2	29
Howard Duncan	6	38	6.3	1	12
Jason Hilliard	2	14	7	0	9
Brad Greetis	1	10	10	0	10
Peter Martinez	1	5	5	0	5

==== Touchdowns ====
Player	TD's	Rush	Rec	Ret	Pts
Damien Groce	31	3	26	2	188
David Saunders	18	0	18	0	112
Harold Wells	17	13	4	0	102
Marcus Knight	9	0	9	0	62
Josh Bush	10	2	6	2	60
B. J. Barre	9	2	7	0	56
Matt Nagy	6	6	0	0	36
Freddie Solomon	3	0	3	0	18
Brad Greetis	2	2	0	0	12
Darcy Levy	2	0	2	0	12
Cole Magner	2	0	2	0	12
Matthew Thomas	2	0	2	0	12
Howard Duncan	1	0	1	0	6
Jason Shelley	1	0	1	0	6

=== Defense ===
Player	Tackles	Solo	Assisted	Sack	Solo	Assisted	INT	Yards	TD's	Long
Brandon Hefflin	105	88	34	0	0	0	2	0	0	0
Jerald Brown	65.5	57	17	0	0	0	5	38	0	22
Rober' Freeman	58	52	12	0	0	0	2	6	0	6
B. J. Barre	51	44	14	0	0	0	1	9	0	9
Ken Jones	28.5	21	15	9.5	9	1	0	0	0	0
Jason Shelley	22.5	18	9	0	0	0	2	8	0	8
Josh Bush	20	17	6	0	0	0	0	0	0	0
Bernard Riley	20	15	10	1	1	0	0	0	0	0
Harold Wells	19.5	17	5	0	0	0	0	0	0	0
Kelvin Kinney	17.5	15	5	3	3	0	0	0	0	0
Leroy Thompson	17.5	14	7	.5	0	1	0	0	0	0
Scott Dreisbach	11	10	2	0	0	0	0	0	0	0
David Saunders	11	10	2	0	0	0	0	0	0	0
Peter Martinez	6.5	6	1	0	0	0	0	0	0	0
Marcus Knight	5	4	2	0	0	0	0	0	0	0
Damien Groce	3.5	3	1	0	0	0	0	0	0	0
Ken Kocher	3	2	2	1	1	0	0	0	0	0
Brad Greetis	3	2	2	0	0	0	0	0	0	0
Josh Harris	3	3	0	0	0	0	0	0	0	0
Jason Hilliard	3	3	0	0	0	0	0	0	0	0
Freddie Solomon	2.5	2	1	0	0	0	0	0	0	0
Eddie Freeman	1.5	0	3	.5	0	1	0	0	0	0
Howard Duncan	1	1	0	0	0	1	0	0	0	0
Matt Nagy	1	1	0	0	0	1	0	0	0	0
Will Rabatin	1	1	0	0	0	1	0	0	0	0

=== Special teams ===
==== Kick return ====
Player	Ret	Yards	TD's	Long	Avg	Ret	Yards	TD's	Long	Avg
Damien Groce	40	825	2	56	20.6	1	6	0	6	6
Josh Bush	39	758	2	58	19.4	0	0	0	0	0
B. J. Barre	5	59	0	31	11.8	2	20	0	17	20
Matthew Thomas	3	47	0	24	15.7	0	0	0	0	0
Jason Shelley	3	24	0	21	8	0	0	0	0	0
Josh Harris	1	4	0	4	4	0	0	0	0	0
Brandon Hefflin	1	4	0	4	4	0	0	0	0	0
Marcus Knight	1	4	0	4	4	0	0	0	0	0
David Saunders	0	0	0	0	0	1	0	0	0	0

==== Kicking ====
Player	Extra pt.	Extra pt. Att.	FG	FGA	Long	Pct.	Pts
Peter Martinez	80	97	10	20	45	0.500	110
Matt Nagy	0	1	0	0	0	0.000	0

== Playoff Stats ==
=== Offense ===
==== Quarterback ====
Player	Comp.	Att.	Comp%	Yards	TD's	INT's
Matt Nagy	19	26	73	262	5	0

==== Running backs ====
Player	Car.	Yards	Avg.	TD's	Long
Harold Wells	6	15	2.5	0	6
Damien Groce	1	6	6	0	6
B. J. Barre	1	2	2	1	2
Matt Nagy	4	−1	-.3	1	1

==== Wide receivers ====
Player	Rec.	Yards	Avg.	TD's	Long
Damien Groce	7	98	14	2	30
Marcus Knight	6	82	13.7	1	23
David Saunders	3	37	12.3	1	25
Josh Bush	2	34	17	0	24
Harold Wells	1	11	11	1	11

=== Special teams ===
==== Kick return ====
Player	Ret	Yards	Avg	Long
Josh Bush	5	103	20.6	29
B. J. Barre	1	6	6	6

==== Kicking ====
Player	Extra pt.	Extra pt. Att.	FG	FGA	Long	Pts
Peter Martinez	8	8	0	1	–	8

== Regular season ==
=== Week 1: at Nashville Kats ===
	1	2	3	4	Total
CLB	7	24	13	14	58
NAS	13	16	0	27	56

Scoring Summary:

1st Quarter:

2nd Quarter:

3rd Quarter:

4th Quarter:

=== Week 2: at New Orleans VooDoo ===
	1	2	3	4	Total
CLB	10	9	19	7	45
NO	7	17	14	14	52

Scoring Summary:

1st Quarter:

2nd Quarter:

3rd Quarter:

4th Quarter:

=== Week 4: vs Chicago Rush ===
	1	2	3	4	Total
CHI	14	24	7	10	55
CLB	14	14	6	13	47

Scoring Summary:

1st Quarter:

2nd Quarter:

3rd Quarter:

4th Quarter:

=== Week 5: vs Georgia Force ===
	1	2	3	4	Total
GEO	6	21	14	20	61
CLB	10	31	7	14	62

Scoring Summary:

1st Quarter:

2nd Quarter:

3rd Quarter:

4th Quarter:

=== Week 6: at Dallas Desperados ===
	1	2	3	4	Total
CLB	14	23	0	14	51
DAL	7	7	14	25	53

Scoring Summary:

1st Quarter:

2nd Quarter:

3rd Quarter:

4th Quarter:

=== Week 7: vs Austin Wranglers ===
	1	2	3	4	Total
AUS	21	7	7	14	49
CLB	14	17	21	20	72

Scoring Summary:

1st Quarter:

2nd Quarter:

3rd Quarter:

4th Quarter:

=== Week 8: vs Philadelphia Soul ===
	1	2	3	4	Total
PHI	0	10	3	8	21
CLB	0	20	3	21	44

Scoring Summary:

1st Quarter:

2nd Quarter:

3rd Quarter:

4th Quarter:

=== Week 9: at Tampa Bay Storm ===
	1	2	3	4	Total
CLB	7	6	13	6	32
TB	7	3	14	10	34

Scoring Summary:

1st Quarter:

2nd Quarter:

3rd Quarter:

4th Quarter:

=== Week 10: vs New York Dragons ===
	1	2	3	4	Total
NYD	14	7	14	7	42
CLB	14	17	13	7	51

Scoring Summary:

1st Quarter:

2nd Quarter:

3rd Quarter:

4th Quarter:

=== Week 11: vs Grand Rapids Rampage ===
	1	2	3	4	Total
GR	13	9	20	14	56
CLB	27	7	20	5	59

Scoring Summary:

1st Quarter:

2nd Quarter:

3rd Quarter:

4th Quarter:

=== Week 12: at Colorado Crush ===
	1	2	3	4	Total
CLB	6	14	0	20	40
COL	14	21	6	17	58

Scoring Summary:

1st Quarter:

2nd Quarter:

3rd Quarter:

4th Quarter:

=== Week 13: vs Dallas Desperados ===
	1	2	3	4	Total
DAL	14	21	7	14	56
CLB	7	14	14	12	47

Scoring Summary:

1st Quarter:

2nd Quarter:

3rd Quarter:

4th Quarter:

=== Week 14: at Georgia Force ===
	1	2	3	4	Total
CLB	7	6	0	20	33
GEO	6	13	13	22	54

Scoring Summary:

1st Quarter:

2nd Quarter:

3rd Quarter:

4th Quarter:

=== Week 15: vs Kansas City Brigade ===
	1	2	3	4	Total
KC	27	0	7	13	47
CLB	13	0	0	21	34

Scoring Summary:

1st Quarter:

2nd Quarter:

3rd Quarter:

4th Quarter:

=== Week 16: at Philadelphia Soul ===
	1	2	3	4	Total
CLB	14	13	20	6	53
PHI	14	13	14	15	56

Scoring Summary:

1st Quarter:

2nd Quarter:

3rd Quarter:

4th Quarter:

=== Week 17: at New York Dragons ===
	1	2	3	4	Total
CLB	21	23	16	14	74
NYD	14	9	14	6	43

Scoring Summary:

1st Quarter:

2nd Quarter:

3rd Quarter:

4th Quarter:

== Playoffs ==
=== Week 1: at Tampa Bay Storm ===
	1	2	3	4	Total
(6) CLB	14	21	7	14	56
(3) TAM	14	21	7	13	55

at the St. Pete Times Forum, Tampa, Florida

The Destroyers entered the playoffs for the first time since their move to Columbus. In a game that was back-and-forth scoring, the key play was a missed extra point by Storm kicker Seth Marler with 1:06 left in the game. Following a delay-of-game penalty, Marler missed an extra point attempt that, had he made it, would have given the Storm a 56–49 lead. After Columbus got the ball on the ensuing kickoff, they drove down to the Storm 1-yard line with 10 seconds left. Columbus QB Matt Nagy called his own number and sneaked into the Storm endzone with 7.9 left in the game, and, after the extra point attempt, the Destroyers had a 56–55 lead and looked to pull off the upset. With 3 seconds left and at their own 10-yard line, Marler tried to make amends by attempting a field goal that, if good, would give the Storm a 58–56 win and a game against division rival Georgia. Marler's kick looked good to begin with, but curved off to the left and missed, giving Columbus the upset win and a matchup against the 15–1 Dallas Desperados.

Scoring Summary:

1st Quarter:

- 1:41 TB- Terrill Shaw 9 Yard Pass From Brett Dietz (Seth Marler Kick) – 7–0 TB
- 4:10 CLB- Damien Groce 29 Yard Pass From Matt Nagy (Peter Martinez Kick) – 7–7
- 9:14 TB- Terrill Shaw 9 Yard Pass From Brett Dietz (Seth Marler Kick) – 14–7 TB
- 10:52 CLB- Harold Wells 11 Yard Pass From Matt Nagy (Peter Martinez Kick) – 14–14

2nd Quarter:

- 1:40 CLB- B.J. Barre 50 Yard Interception Return (Peter Martinez Kick) – 21–14 CLB
- 6:11 TB- Brett Dietz 2 Yard Run (Seth Marler Kick) – 21–21
- 10:53 CLB- Marcus Knight 23 Yard Pass From Matt Nagy (Peter Martinez Kick) 28–21 CLB
- 12:43 TB- Lawrence Samuels 18 Yard Pass From Brett Dietz (Seth Marler Kick) – 28–28
- 14:34 CLB- B.J. Barre 2 Yard Run (Peter Martinez Kick) – 35–28 CLB
- 14:41 TB- Terrill Shaw 2 Yard Pass From Brett Dietz (Seth Marler Kick) 35–35

3rd Quarter:

- 11:15 TB- Torrance Marshall 1 Yard Run (Seth Marler Kick) – 42–35 TB
- 13:04 CLB- Damien Groce 30 Yard Pass From Matt Nagy (Peter Martinez Kick) – 42–42

4th Quarter:

- 3:42 TB- Terrill Shaw 8 Yard Pass From Brett Dietz (Seth Marler Kick) – 49–42 TB
- 7:47 CLB- David Saunders 3 Yard Pass From Matt Nagy (Peter Martinez Kick) – 49–49
- 13:09 TB- Hank Edwards 17 Yard Pass From Brett Dietz (Pat Failed) – 55–49 TB
- 14:53 CLB- Matt Nagy 1 Yard Run (Peter Martinez Kick) – 56–55 CLB

Attendance: 10,221

- Offensive player of the game: Terrill Shaw (TB)
- Defensive player of the game: B.J. Barre (CLB)
- Ironman of the game: Lawrence Samuels (TB)

Team	1st Down.	Rush. Yds	Pass. Yds	Fumbles/lost	Fumble yds	Penal./yds	TOP	3rd Down.	4th Down.
CLB	20	22	260	0/0	0	12/63	19:27	4/6	1/2
TB	29	14	315	0/0	0	11/63	40:33	3/5	1/1

=== Week 2: at Dallas Desperados ===
	1	2	3	4	Total
(6) CLB	21	7	17	21	66
(1) DAL	21	17	0	21	59

at the American Airlines Center in Dallas, Texas

The Columbus Destroyers defeated the Dallas Desperados 66–59 at the American Airlines Center in Dallas, Texas. Dallas led 38–28 at halftime and appeared to be in control after defeating Columbus twice earlier in the season. However, the momentum shifted quickly at the start of the second half when back-to-back kickoffs by Peter Martinez bounced off the goalpost and were recovered by Columbus, leading to two quick touchdowns and a 42–38 lead. Columbus continued to build on the comeback with a field goal following an interception and later added a 28-yard touchdown reception by Jason Shelley to secure the victory.

Scoring Summary:

1st Quarter:

2nd Quarter:

3rd Quarter:

4th Quarter:

Attendance:

Team	1st Down.	Rush. Yds	Pass. Yds	Fumbles/lost	Fumble yds	Penal./yds	TOP	3rd Down.	4th Down.
CLB	0	0	0	0/0	0	0/0	00:00	0/0	0/0
DAL	0	0	0	0/0	0	0/0	00:00	0/0	0/0

=== Week 3 (Conference Championship): at Georgia Force ===
at Philips Arena in Atlanta, Georgia

	1	2	3	4	Total
(6) CLB	7	28	13	18	66
(2) GA	7	14	21	14	56

The Destroyers lost against the San Jose SaberCats, at the ArenaBowl XXI In New Orleans, with a score of 55-33.

Scoring Summary:

1st Quarter:

2nd Quarter:

3rd Quarter:

4th Quarter:

Attendance:

=== ArenaBowl XXI vs. San Jose SaberCats ===
at New Orleans Arena in New Orleans, Louisiana
