= 1993 Tampa Bay Storm season =

Arena Football League team season

- Owner: Bob Gries
- Head coach: Lary Kuharich
- Home stadium: Florida Suncoast Dome

Results
- Record: 9–3
- Division place: 2nd
- Playoffs: Won ArenaBowl VII vs. Detroit Drive

The 1993 Tampa Bay Storm season was the seventh season for the Arena Football League franchise. They finished 9–1 in the Southern Division, tied with the Orlando Predators, but Orlando won the division due to having scored more points than the Storm. The Storm would later beat Orlando in the league semi-final then win ArenaBowl VII against the Detroit Drive.

== Regular season ==
=== Schedule ===
Week	Date	Opponent	Results		Game site
Week	Date	Opponent	Final score	Team record	Game site
1	May 14	Cleveland Thunderbolts	W 50-14	1–0	Florida Suncoast Dome
2	May 21	at Orlando Predators	L 34-46	1-1	Orlando Arena
3	May 28	at Miami Hooters	W 29-22	2-1	Charlotte Coliseum
4	June 5	Charlotte Rage	W 52-19	3-1	Florida Suncoast Dome
5	June 12	at Arizona Rattlers	W 63-33	4-1	America West Arena
6	June 19	Orlando Predators	L 45-46	4-2	Florida Suncoast Dome
7	June 26	at Albany Firebirds	W 36-33	5-2	Knickerbocker Arena
8	July 2	Cincinnati Rockers	W 61-51	6-2	Florida Suncoast Dome
9	July 9	at Charlotte Rage	L 38-40	6-3	Charlotte Coliseum
10	July 17	Miami Hooters	W 65-46	7-3	Florida Suncoast Dome
11	July 24	Albany Firebirds	W 48-26	8-3	Florida Suncoast Dome
12	July 30	at Cleveland Thunderbolts	W 50-13	9-3	Richfield Coliseum

=== Standings ===
1993 Arena Football League standings
Team	Overall			Conference			Scoring				
Team	W	L	PCT	W	L	PCT	PF	PA	PF (Avg.)	PA (Avg.)	STK
American Conference
xyz-Detroit Drive	11	1	.917	8	0	1.000	506	372	42.1	31	W 4
x-Arizona Rattlers	7	5	.583	6	2	.750	486	489	40.5	40.75	L 1
x-Dallas Texans	3	9	.250	2	6	.250	454	551	37.83	45.92	L 5
Cleveland Thunderbolts	2	10	.167	2	6	.250	357	484	29.75	40.33	L 7
Cincinnati Rockers	2	10	.167	2	6	.250	394	525	32.83	43.75	W 1
National Conference
xy-Orlando Predators	10	2	.833	6	2	.750	526	355	43.83	29.58	L 1
x-Tampa Bay Storm	9	3	.750	5	3	.625	571	389	47.58	32.42	W 3
x-Charlotte Rage	6	6	.500	3	5	.375	440	509	36.66	42.42	L 2
x-Miami Hooters	5	7	.417	3	5	.375	258	491	21.5	40.92	W 2
x-Albany Firebirds	5	7	.417	3	5	.375	482	490	40.16	40.83	W 1

z – clinched homefield advantage

y – clinched division title

x – clinched playoff spot

== Playoffs ==
Round	Date	Opponent	Results		Game site
Round	Date	Opponent	Final score	Team record	Game site
1st	August 6	Albany Firebirds	W 48-34	1–0	Florida Suncoast Dome
Semi-finals	August 14	at Orlando Predators	W 55-52	2-0	Orlando Arena
ArenaBowl VII	August 21	at Detroit Drive	W 51-31	3-0	Joe Louis Arena

== Roster ==
1993 Tampa Bay Storm roster
Quarterbacks: 7 Jay Gruden; -- Terry Jordan; -- Terry Karg; Wide Receivers/Defensive Backs: -- Eddie Brown; -- Bobby Byrd; -- Amod Field; -- Anthony Howard; -- Jeff Mayes; 20 Stevie Thomas; 1 Darren Willis; -- Jerry Woods	Running Backs/Linebackers: -- Les Barley; 30 Andre Bowden; -- David Smith; Offensive Linemen/Defensive Linemen: -- Keith Browner; -- Tony Chickillo; -- Dennis Dahlke; -- Ralph Jarvis; -- Darrin Kenney; -- Joe March; 65 Pat Sperduto; -- Carl Thomas; 55 Carl Watts; -- Deatrich Wise	Defensive Specialists: -- Corey Dowden; 24 Tracey Perkins; Kickers: -- Arden Czyzewski; Rookies in italics Roster updated February 17, 2014; 28 Active, 0 Inactive, 0 PS → More rosters

== Awards ==
Position	Player	Award	All-Arena team
Fullback/Linebacker	Andre Bowden	none	1st
Offensive/Defensive Lineman	Deatrich Wise	none	1st
