= 1993 Detroit Drive season =

Arena Football League team season

- Head coach: Tim Marcum
- Home stadium: Joe Louis Arena

Results
- Record: 11–1
- Division place: 1st
- Playoffs: L ArenaBowl VII 31–51 vs. Tampa Bay Storm

The 1993 Detroit Drive season was the sixth season for the Drive, and the last for the franchise in Detroit, Michigan. They finished 11–1 and were defeated in ArenaBowl VII.

== Regular season ==
=== Schedule ===
Week	Date	Opponent	Results		Game site
Week	Date	Opponent	Final score	Team record	Game site
1	May 15	at Arizona Rattlers	W 49–29	1–0	America West Arena
2	May 22	at Cincinnati Rockers	W 40–35	2–0	Riverfront Coliseum
3	May 28	Dallas Texans	W 42–38	3–0	Joe Louis Arena
4	June 4	Cincinnati Rockers	W 38–19	4–0	Joe Louis Arena
5	June 11	at Charlotte Rage	W 42–20	5–0	Charlotte Coliseum
6	June 18	Miami Hooters	W 27–20	6–0	Joe Louis Arena
7	June 25	Cleveland Thunderbolts	W 37–32	7–0	Joe Louis Arena
8	July 2	at Orlando Predators	L 28–45	7–1	Orlando Arena
9	July 9	Albany Firebirds	W 65–19	8–1	Joe Louis Arena
10	July 16	at Cleveland Thunderbolts	W 54–43	9–1	Richfield Coliseum
11	July 23	at Dallas Texans	W 42–40	10–1	Reunion Arena
12	July 30	Arizona Rattlers	W 42–32	11–1	Joe Louis Arena

=== Standings ===
1993 Arena Football League standings
Team	Overall			Conference			Scoring				
Team	W	L	PCT	W	L	PCT	PF	PA	PF (Avg.)	PA (Avg.)	STK
American Conference
xyz-Detroit Drive	11	1	.917	8	0	1.000	506	372	42.1	31	W 4
x-Arizona Rattlers	7	5	.583	6	2	.750	486	489	40.5	40.75	L 1
x-Dallas Texans	3	9	.250	2	6	.250	454	551	37.83	45.92	L 5
Cleveland Thunderbolts	2	10	.167	2	6	.250	357	484	29.75	40.33	L 7
Cincinnati Rockers	2	10	.167	2	6	.250	394	525	32.83	43.75	W 1
National Conference
xy-Orlando Predators	10	2	.833	6	2	.750	526	355	43.83	29.58	L 1
x-Tampa Bay Storm	9	3	.750	5	3	.625	571	389	47.58	32.42	W 3
x-Charlotte Rage	6	6	.500	3	5	.375	440	509	36.66	42.42	L 2
x-Miami Hooters	5	7	.417	3	5	.375	258	491	21.5	40.92	W 2
x-Albany Firebirds	5	7	.417	3	5	.375	482	490	40.16	40.83	W 1

z – clinched homefield advantage

y – clinched division title

x – clinched playoff spot

== Playoffs ==
Round	Date	Opponent	Results		Game site
Round	Date	Opponent	Final score	Team record	Game site
1st	August 7	Dallas Texans	W 51–6	1–0	Joe Louis Arena
Semi-finals	August 14	Arizona Rattlers	W 38–34	2–0	Joe Louis Arena
ArenaBowl VII	August 21	Tampa Bay Storm	L 31–51	2–1	Joe Louis Arena

== Roster ==
1993 Detroit Drive roster
Quarterbacks: -- Ron Adams; -- Gilbert Renfroe; Wide Receivers/Defensive Backs: -- Grantis Bell; -- Michael Clark; -- Kenneth Harper; 27 George LaFrance; -- Andre Langley; -- Jody Marshall; -- Chris Roscoe; -- Elliot Searcy; -- Wayne Williams	Fullbacks/Linebackers: -- Tony Burse; 44 Alvin Rettig; -- Broderick Sargent; Offensive Linemen/Defensive Linemen: -- Winfred Bryant; 88 John Corker; -- Flint Fleming; -- Erwin Grabisna; -- James Goode; -- William Harris; -- Dannie Lockett; -- Willie Wyatt; -- John Vitale	Defensive Specialist: -- Cecil Doggette; -- Rod McSwain; Kickers: -- John Langeloh; Rookies in italics Roster updated July 17, 2013; 26 Active, 0 Inactive, 0 PS → More rosters

== Awards ==
Position	Player	Award	All-Arena team
Offensive/Defensive Line	Dannie Lockett	none	1st
Defensive Specialist	Rod McSwain	none	1st
