= 1993 Arizona Rattlers season =

Indoor football season

- Owner: Jerry Colangelo
- Head coach: Danny White
- Home stadium: America West Arena

Results
- Record: 7–5
- Division place: 2nd
- Playoffs: Lost Semi-finals 34–38 vs. Detroit Drive
- Team MVP: Hunkie Cooper

The 1993 Arizona Rattlers season marked the 2nd season for the franchise. The Rattlers sold out every home game during the season.

== Regular season ==
=== Schedule ===
Week	Date	Opponent	Results		Game site
Week	Date	Opponent	Final score	Team record	Game site
1	May 15	Detroit Drive	L 29–49	0–1	America West Arena
2	May 21	Charlotte Rage	L 46–49	0–2	America West Arena
3	May 28	at Cleveland Thunderbolts	W 30–20	1–2	Richfield Coliseum
4	June 5	at Albany Firebirds	W 54–50	2–2	Knickerbocker Arena
5	June 12	Tampa Bay Storm	L 33–63	2–3	America West Arena
6	June 18	at Dallas Texans	W 43–40	3–3	Reunion Arena
7	June 26	at Cincinnati Rockers	W 27–26	4–3	Riverfront Coliseum
8	July 2	Dallas Texans	W 73–45	5–3	America West Arena
9	July 10	Cleveland Thunderbolts	W 34–15	6–3	America West Arena
10	July 16	at Orlando Predators	L 34–48	6–4	Orlando Arena
11	July 23	Cincinnati Rockers	W 51–43	7–4	America West Arena
12	July 31	at Detroit Drive	L 32–34	7–5	Joe Louis Arena

=== Standings ===
1993 Arena Football League standings
Team	Overall			Conference			Scoring				
Team	W	L	PCT	W	L	PCT	PF	PA	PF (Avg.)	PA (Avg.)	STK
American Conference
xyz-Detroit Drive	11	1	.917	8	0	1.000	506	372	42.1	31	W 4
x-Arizona Rattlers	7	5	.583	6	2	.750	486	489	40.5	40.75	L 1
x-Dallas Texans	3	9	.250	2	6	.250	454	551	37.83	45.92	L 5
Cleveland Thunderbolts	2	10	.167	2	6	.250	357	484	29.75	40.33	L 7
Cincinnati Rockers	2	10	.167	2	6	.250	394	525	32.83	43.75	W 1
National Conference
xy-Orlando Predators	10	2	.833	6	2	.750	526	355	43.83	29.58	L 1
x-Tampa Bay Storm	9	3	.750	5	3	.625	571	389	47.58	32.42	W 3
x-Charlotte Rage	6	6	.500	3	5	.375	440	509	36.66	42.42	L 2
x-Miami Hooters	5	7	.417	3	5	.375	258	491	21.5	40.92	W 2
x-Albany Firebirds	5	7	.417	3	5	.375	482	490	40.16	40.83	W 1

z – clinched homefield advantage

y – clinched division title

x – clinched playoff spot

== Playoffs ==
Round	Date	Opponent	Results		Game site
Round	Date	Opponent	Final score	Team record	Game site
1st	August 8	Charlotte Rage	W 56–49	1–0	America West Arena
Semi-finals	August 14	at Detroit Drive	L 34–38	1–1	Joe Louis Arena

== Roster ==
1993 Arizona Rattlers roster
Quarterbacks: 13 Sherdrick Bonner; -- Paul Justin; -- Chad White; Wide receivers/Defensive backs: -- Brian Covington; -- Eric Dooley; -- Michael Richmond; -- Sean Roundtree; 80 Cedric Tillman	Fullbacks/Linebackers: -- Craig Barr; -- David Clarke; 44 Andy Coviello; -- Stump Mitchell; -- Jody Reinoehl; Offensive linemen/Defensive linemen: -- Richard Ashe; -- John Bankhead; -- Chris Baus; -- Corey Brannon; -- Arnold Campbell; -- Tracy Gordon; -- Darin Mrachek; -- Judd Rachow; -- Kevin Thomas; -- Barry Waggoner; -- Doc Wise; 60 John Zinser	Wide receiver/Linebackers: 14 Hunkie Cooper; 8 Roy Hurd; -- Garland Rivers; -- Steve Stutsman; Kickers: -- John Marxen; -- Luis Zendejas; Rookies in italics Roster updated July 18, 2013; 31 Active, 0 Inactive, 0 PS → More rosters

== Awards ==
Position	Player	Award	All-Arena team
Offensive specialist	Hunkie Cooper	MVP	1st
Head coach	Danny White	Coach of the Year	–
General manager	Bryan Colangelo	Executive of the Year	–
