= John Zinser =

John Zinser may refer to:

- John Zinser (American football)
- John Zinser (game designer)
