= Bobby Bounds =

American football player (born 1969)

No. 7
- Position: Quarterback

Personal information
- Born: January 13, 1969 (age 57); Dallas, Texas, U.S.
- Listed height: 6 ft 0 in (1.83 m)
- Listed weight: 185 lb (84 kg)

Career information
- High school: Picayune Memorial (Picayune, Mississippi)
- College: East Texas State
- NFL draft: 1992: undrafted

Career history
- Cleveland Thunderbolts (1992–1993); Benicarlo Tifons (1994); Shreveport Pirates (1994)*
- * Offseason or practice squad member only

Career AFL statistics
- Comp. / Att.: 21 / 61
- Passing yards: 231
- TD–INT: 3–5
- Passer rating: 24.69
- Rushing TDs: 1
- Stats at ArenaFan.com

Robert Edward Bettis Bounds (born January 13, 1969) is an American former professional football quarterback who played two seasons with the Cleveland Thunderbolts of the Arena Football League (AFL). He played college football at East Texas State University, where he was an All-American. He was also a member of the Benicarlo Tifons in Spain and the Shreveport Pirates of the Canadian Football League (CFL).

== Early life ==
Robert Edward Bettis Bounds was born on January 13, 1969, in Dallas, Texas. He moved to Picayune, Mississippi at an early age and was a standout quarterback at Picayune Memorial High School, in the Southwest part of Mississippi. In his senior season for the Maroon Tide, Bounds led Picayune to Win the 5A State Championship. Bounds graduated from PMHS in 1987 and accepted a scholarship to play college football at East Texas State University.

== College career ==
=== Freshmen and sophomore seasons ===
Bounds redshirted the 1987 season, and then was a back-up to All-Conference QB and future professional Mike Trigg. He saw his first action during the 1988 season in which the Lions finished 8–3 and second in the Lone Star Conference. Bounds became the starter in 1989 as a sophomore as the Lions finished 4–6 and fifth in the conference. Bounds completed 107 passes out of 198 attempts for 1,521 yards, 8 touchdowns, and 14 interceptions.

=== Junior season ===
In Bounds' junior year the Lions had a major turnaround as he led ETSU to a Lone Star Conference Championship with a 7–0 record in conference play, the Lions first conference championship since 1983. The Lions also qualified for the NCAA Division II National Playoffs for the first time since joining the NCAA in 1982. The Lions defeated Grand Valley State but then bowed out to eventual national champion Pittsburg State to finish with an overall 10–3 record. Bounds finished season with 1,905 passing yards and 17 touchdowns. He was named First team All Conference, and consensus Offensive Back of the year.

=== Senior season ===
As a senior, Bounds led the Lions to an 8–4–1 record and a second-place finish in the conference. He played through injuries and also battled classmate Mike Meador for snaps, however this did not prevent him from being first team all conference for a second straight season and notching All-American honors by Don Hansen's Football Gazette. The Lions qualified for the NCAA playoffs once more, once again defeating Grand Valley State in the first round before bowing out to the Gorillas of Pittsburg State again, a team the Lions had defeated earlier in the season. Bounds left Commerce as the all-time leader in passing yards with 5,955 yards (held record for 27 years) and total offense with 6,369 yards. He graduated from ETSU with a degree in Kinesiology & Sports Studies. He still holds records for total offense in a career and is second in career passing yards.

Bounds was inducted into the school's athletics hall of fame in 2008.

== Professional career ==
Bounds went undrafted. He played for the AFL's Cleveland Thunderbolts during the 1992 and 1993 seasons, starting in 1992. He was a player/coach for the Benicarlo Tifons of The Professional Football League from Spain in 1994. Bounds left the organization after being signed by the Shreveport Pirates of the CFL. He was released by the Pirates in June 1994.

== Coaching career ==
- 1992–1993 - GA East Texas State – Quarterback Coach –
- 1995 – Newman Smith HS – Quarterback Coach –
- 1996–1997 – Marcus HS – Wide Receiver Coach – 1997 Texas 5A State Champions –
- 1998 – Picayune Memorial HS(MS)- Quarterback Coach –
- 1999–2000 – Gainesville HS – Offensive Coordinator –
- 2001–2002 – Dallas W.T. White HS – Offensive Coordinator –
- 2003 – Dallas Skyline HS – Offensive Coordinator –
- 2004 – Newman Smith HS – Offensive Coordinator –
- 2005–2006 – Newman Smith HS – Head Coach –
- 2006–2019 – Took a break from coaching (until 2020) to start his own concrete construction companies – (California Construction (2016) and BMFB Concrete Contractors)
- 2020 – 2022 – Frisco Fighters (IFL) Defense
- 2024–present – Frisco Fighters (IFL) Offense

In March 2023, Bounds was named the director of player personnel for the football team at Texas A&M University–Commerce. He resigned in November 2023 to spend more time with his family.

== Personal life ==
Bounds later became the owner of a construction company.
