= Richard Carey (American football) =

American football player (born 1968)

No. 34, 20
- Position: Cornerback / Safety

Personal information
- Born: May 6, 1968 (age 58); Seattle, Washington, U.S.
- Listed height: 5 ft 9 in (1.75 m)
- Listed weight: 185 lb (84 kg)

Career information
- High school: Garfield
- College: Idaho
- NFL draft: 1989: undrafted

Career history
- Cincinnati Bengals (1989); Buffalo Bills (1990); Atlanta Falcons (1991)*; New York/New Jersey Knights (1992); Cincinnati Rockers (1992–1993); Tampa Bay Storm (1996)
- * Offseason or practice squad member only

Awards and highlights
- ArenaBowl champion (1996)
- Stats at Pro Football Reference
- Stats at ArenaFan.com

Richard Andre Carey (born May 6, 1968, in Seattle, Washington) is an American former professional football player who was a defensive back in the National Football League (NFL) for the Cincinnati Bengals and Buffalo Bills. He played college football for the Idaho Vandals.
