= 1993 Orlando Predators season =

Arena Football League team season

- Head coach: Perry Moss
- Home stadium: Orlando Arena

Results
- Record: 10-2
- Division place: 1st
- Playoffs: Lost Semi-finals vs Tampa Bay Storm

The 1993 Orlando Predators season was the 3rd season for the franchise. They went 10-2 and lost in the AFL semi-finals to the Tampa Bay Storm.

== Regular season ==
=== Schedule ===
Week	Date	Opponent	Results		Game site
Week	Date	Opponent	Final score	Team record	Game site
1	May 14	Albany Firebirds	W 40-30	1-0	Orlando Arena
2	May 21	Tampa Bay Storm	W 46-34	2-0	Orlando Arena
3	May 29	at Cincinnati Rockers	W 37-16	3-0	Riverfront Coliseum
4	June 5	at Miami Hooters	L 37-45	3–1	Miami Arena
	June 11	Miami Hooters	W 56-14	4–1	Orlando Arena
6	June 19	at Tampa Bay Storm	W 46-45	5–1	Florida Suncoast Dome
7	June 25	at Charlotte Rage	W 43–20	6–1	Charlotte Coliseum
8	July 2	Detroit Drive	W 45-28	7–1	Orlando Arena
9	July 9	at Dallas Texans	W 49-17	8–1	Reunion Arena
10	July 16	Arizona Rattlers	W 48-34	9–1	Orlando Arena
11	July 23	Charlotte Rage	W 44-23	10–1	Orlando Arena
12	July 31	at Albany Firebirds	L 35-49	10-2	Knickerbocker Arena

=== Standings ===
1993 Arena Football League standings
Team	Overall			Conference			Scoring				
Team	W	L	PCT	W	L	PCT	PF	PA	PF (Avg.)	PA (Avg.)	STK
American Conference
xyz-Detroit Drive	11	1	.917	8	0	1.000	506	372	42.1	31	W 4
x-Arizona Rattlers	7	5	.583	6	2	.750	486	489	40.5	40.75	L 1
x-Dallas Texans	3	9	.250	2	6	.250	454	551	37.83	45.92	L 5
Cleveland Thunderbolts	2	10	.167	2	6	.250	357	484	29.75	40.33	L 7
Cincinnati Rockers	2	10	.167	2	6	.250	394	525	32.83	43.75	W 1
National Conference
xy-Orlando Predators	10	2	.833	6	2	.750	526	355	43.83	29.58	L 1
x-Tampa Bay Storm	9	3	.750	5	3	.625	571	389	47.58	32.42	W 3
x-Charlotte Rage	6	6	.500	3	5	.375	440	509	36.66	42.42	L 2
x-Miami Hooters	5	7	.417	3	5	.375	258	491	21.5	40.92	W 2
x-Albany Firebirds	5	7	.417	3	5	.375	482	490	40.16	40.83	W 1

z – clinched homefield advantage

y – clinched division title

x – clinched playoff spot

== Playoffs ==
Round	Date	Opponent	Results		Game site
Round	Date	Opponent	Final score	Team record	Game site
1st	August 6	Miami Hooters	W 41-13	1–0	Orlando Arena
Semi-finals	August 14	Tampa Bay Storm	L 52-55	1-1	Orlando Arena

== Roster ==
1993 Orlando Predators roster
Quarterbacks: 5 Ben Bennett; -- Mike Hold, Jr.; Wide Receivers/Defensive Backs: 84 Carl Aikens, Jr.; 29 Durwood Roquemore; 26 Tony Scott; -- Jeff Smith; -- Sean Beckton; 82 Barry Wagner; -- Herkie Walls; -- Riley Ware	Fullbacks/Linebackers: -- Paul McGowan; -- Jerry Odom; 33 Bill Stewart; Offensive Linemen/Defensive Linemen: -- Henry Brown; 78 Webbie Burnett; -- Derrick Carr; -- Eric Drakes; -- Bubba Metts; 50 Curt Mull; 77 Rusty Russell; -- John Shannon; -- Isaac Williams	Wide Receivers/Linebackers: -- Chris Ford; -- Billy Owens; Kickers: 17 Jorge Cimadevilla; Rookies in italics Roster updated March 27, 2013; 25 Active, 0 Inactive, 0 PS → More rosters

== Awards ==
Position	Player	Award	All-Arena team
Wide Receiver/Defensive Back	Barry Wagner	Ironman of the Year	1st
Quarterback	Ben Bennett	-	1st
Defensive Specialist	Durwood Roquemore	–	1st
