= 1993 Cleveland Thunderbolts season =

Arena Football League team season

- Head coach: Dave Whinham
- Home stadium: Richfield Coliseum

Results
- Record: 2–10
- Division place: 4th
- Playoffs: Did not qualify

The 1993 Cleveland Thunderbolts season was the 3rd season for the franchise, and their second in Cleveland, Ohio. They went 2–10 and failed to make the playoffs.

== Regular season ==
=== Schedule ===
Week	Date	Opponent	Results		Game site
Week	Date	Opponent	Final score	Team record	Game site
1	May 14	at Tampa Bay Storm	L 14–50	0–1	Florida Suncoast Dome
2	May 22	at Dallas Texans	W 46–43	1–1	Reunion Arena
3	May 28	Arizona Rattlers	L 20–30	1–2	Richfield Coliseum
4	June 5	Dallas Texans	L 47–51	1–3	Richfield Coliseum
5	June 12	at Cincinnati Rockers	W 45–19	2–3	Riverfront Coliseum
6	June 19	Cincinnati Rockers	L 34–42	2–4	Richfield Coliseum
7	July 25	at Detroit Drive	L 32–37	2–5	Joe Louis Arena
8	July 2	Charlotte Rage	L 24–34	2–6	Richfield Coliseum
9	July 10	at Arizona Rattlers	L 14–34	2–7	America West Arena
10	July 16	Detroit Drive	L 43–54	2–8	Richfield Coliseum
11	July 24	at Miami Hooters	L 25–40	2–9	Miami Arena
12	July 30	Tampa Bay Storm	L 13–50	2–10	Richfield Coliseum

=== Standings ===
1993 Arena Football League standings
Team	Overall			Conference			Scoring				
Team	W	L	PCT	W	L	PCT	PF	PA	PF (Avg.)	PA (Avg.)	STK
American Conference
xyz-Detroit Drive	11	1	.917	8	0	1.000	506	372	42.1	31	W 4
x-Arizona Rattlers	7	5	.583	6	2	.750	486	489	40.5	40.75	L 1
x-Dallas Texans	3	9	.250	2	6	.250	454	551	37.83	45.92	L 5
Cleveland Thunderbolts	2	10	.167	2	6	.250	357	484	29.75	40.33	L 7
Cincinnati Rockers	2	10	.167	2	6	.250	394	525	32.83	43.75	W 1
National Conference
xy-Orlando Predators	10	2	.833	6	2	.750	526	355	43.83	29.58	L 1
x-Tampa Bay Storm	9	3	.750	5	3	.625	571	389	47.58	32.42	W 3
x-Charlotte Rage	6	6	.500	3	5	.375	440	509	36.66	42.42	L 2
x-Miami Hooters	5	7	.417	3	5	.375	258	491	21.5	40.92	W 2
x-Albany Firebirds	5	7	.417	3	5	.375	482	490	40.16	40.83	W 1

z – clinched homefield advantage

y – clinched division title

x – clinched playoff spot

== Roster ==
1993 Cleveland Thunderbolts roster
Quarterbacks: -- Greg Freeman; -- Greg Frey; -- Ray Isaac; -- Kevin Meger; Wide Receivers/Defensive Backs: -- Tracy Archer; -- Bobby Bounds; -- Willie Culpepper; -- Tim Egerton; -- Darryl Gard; -- Andre Giles; -- Alvin Horn; -- Tony Newsom; -- Eric Wilkerson	Fullbacks/Linebackers: -- Peter Burns; -- Johnny Lee Davis; -- Tony Jones; -- Cedric McKinnon; -- Kevin Wolfolk; Offensive Linemen/Defensive Linemen: -- Toney Catchings; -- Mitch Dillard; -- Willie Fears; -- Mike Ferroni; -- John Fletcher; -- Dane Kemp; -- Rickey Newman; -- Phil Poirier; -- Kent Wells	Wide Receivers/Linebackers: -- Zach Dumas; -- Jeff Ellis; -- Chris Harkness; -- Marvin Mattox; -- Eddie Polly; -- Tony Wells; Kickers: -- Björn Nittmo; Rookies in italics Roster updated August 14, 2013; 25 Active, 0 Inactive, 0 PS → More rosters

== Awards ==
Position	Player	Award	All-Arena team	Ref.
Offensive/Defensive Lineman	Willie Fears	none	1st	
