= 1993 Charlotte Rage season =

Arena Football League team season

- General manager: Roman Gabriel
- Head coach: Steve Patton
- Home stadium: Charlotte Coliseum

Results
- Record: 6-6
- Division place: 3rd
- Playoffs: Lost 1st Round (Rattlers) 56-49

The 1993 Charlotte Rage season was the first for the franchise. The Rage finished 6-6 and qualified for the playoffs, where they were defeated by the Arizona Rattlers 56-49.

== Regular season ==
=== Schedule ===
Week	Date	Opponent	Results		Game site
Week	Date	Opponent	Final score	Team record	Game site
1	May 14	Miami Hooters	W 34-32	1–0	Miami Arena
2	May 21	at Arizona Rattlers	W 49-46	2-0	America West Arena
3	May 28	Albany Firebirds	W 65-41	3-0	Charlotte Coliseum
4	June 5	at Tampa Bay Storm	L 19-52	3-1	Florida Suncoast Dome
5	June 11	Detroit Drive	L 20-42	3-2	Charlotte Coliseum
6	June 19	at Albany Firebirds	L 34-61	3-3	Knickerbocker Arena
7	June 25	Orlando Predators	L 20-43	3-4	Charlotte Coliseum
8	July 2	at Cleveland Thunderbolts	W 34-24	4-4	Richfield Coliseum
9	July 9	Tampa Bay Storm	W 40-38	5-4	Charlotte Coliseum
10	July 16	Dallas Texans	W 54-29	6-4	Charlotte Coliseum
11	July 23	at Orlando Predators	L 23-44	6-5	Orlando Arena
12	July 30	Miami Hooters	L 48-57	6-6	Charlotte Coliseum

=== Standings ===
1993 Arena Football League standings
Team	Overall			Conference			Scoring				
Team	W	L	PCT	W	L	PCT	PF	PA	PF (Avg.)	PA (Avg.)	STK
American Conference
xyz-Detroit Drive	11	1	.917	8	0	1.000	506	372	42.1	31	W 4
x-Arizona Rattlers	7	5	.583	6	2	.750	486	489	40.5	40.75	L 1
x-Dallas Texans	3	9	.250	2	6	.250	454	551	37.83	45.92	L 5
Cleveland Thunderbolts	2	10	.167	2	6	.250	357	484	29.75	40.33	L 7
Cincinnati Rockers	2	10	.167	2	6	.250	394	525	32.83	43.75	W 1
National Conference
xy-Orlando Predators	10	2	.833	6	2	.750	526	355	43.83	29.58	L 1
x-Tampa Bay Storm	9	3	.750	5	3	.625	571	389	47.58	32.42	W 3
x-Charlotte Rage	6	6	.500	3	5	.375	440	509	36.66	42.42	L 2
x-Miami Hooters	5	7	.417	3	5	.375	258	491	21.5	40.92	W 2
x-Albany Firebirds	5	7	.417	3	5	.375	482	490	40.16	40.83	W 1

z – clinched homefield advantage

y – clinched division title

x – clinched playoff spot

== Playoffs ==
Round	Date	Opponent	Results		Game site
Round	Date	Opponent	Final score	Team record	Game site
1st	August 8	at Arizona Rattlers	L 49-56	0-1	America West Arena

== Roster ==
1993 Charlotte Rage roster
Quarterbacks: -- Andy Kelly; -- Tony Kimbrough; Wide Receivers/Defensive Backs: -- Davis Smith; 24 Steve Wilks	Fullbacks/Linebackers: -- Les Barley; -- Junior Jackson; Offensive Linemen/Defensive Linemen: -- Tony Bowick	Wide Receiver/Linebackers: -- Ryan Bathea; Kickers: -- Mike Black; Rookies in italics Roster updated March 29, 2013; 9 Active, 0 Inactive, 0 PS → More rosters
