= 1993 Miami Hooters season =

Arena Football League team season

- Head coach: Don Strock
- Home stadium: Miami Arena

Results
- Record: 5–7
- Division place: 4th
- Playoffs: L 1st Round vs. Orlando Predators

The 1993 Miami Hooters season was the second season for the franchise, as their first season in Miami, Florida after moving from Sacramento, California. They finished 5–7 and lost in the 1st round of the AFL playoffs to the Tampa Bay Storm.

== Regular season ==
=== Schedule ===
Week	Date	Opponent	Results		Game site
Week	Date	Opponent	Final score	Team record	Game site
1	May 14	Charlotte Rage	L 32-34	0-1	Miami Arena
2	May 22	at Albany Firebirds	L 23-52	0-2	Knickerbocker Arena
3	May 28	Tampa Bay Storm	L 22-29	0-3	Miami Arena
4	June 5	Orlando Predators	W 45-37	1-3	Miami Arena
5	June 11	at Orlando Predators	L 14-56	1-4	Orlando Arena
6	June 18	at Detroit Drive	L 20-27	1-5	Joe Louis Arena
7	June 25	Dallas Texans	L 28-30 (OT)	1-6	Miami Arena
8	July 2	Albany Firebirds	W 43-27	2-6	Miami Arena
9	July 10	at Cincinnati Rockers	W 59-51	3-6	Riverfront Coliseum
10	July 17	at Tampa Bay Storm	L 46-65	3-7	Florida Suncoast Dome
11	July 24	Cleveland Thunderbolts	W 40-25	4-7	Miami Arena
12	July 3	at Charlotte Rage	W 57-48	5-7	Charlotte Coliseum

=== Standings ===
1993 Arena Football League standings
Team	Overall			Conference			Scoring				
Team	W	L	PCT	W	L	PCT	PF	PA	PF (Avg.)	PA (Avg.)	STK
American Conference
xyz-Detroit Drive	11	1	.917	8	0	1.000	506	372	42.1	31	W 4
x-Arizona Rattlers	7	5	.583	6	2	.750	486	489	40.5	40.75	L 1
x-Dallas Texans	3	9	.250	2	6	.250	454	551	37.83	45.92	L 5
Cleveland Thunderbolts	2	10	.167	2	6	.250	357	484	29.75	40.33	L 7
Cincinnati Rockers	2	10	.167	2	6	.250	394	525	32.83	43.75	W 1
National Conference
xy-Orlando Predators	10	2	.833	6	2	.750	526	355	43.83	29.58	L 1
x-Tampa Bay Storm	9	3	.750	5	3	.625	571	389	47.58	32.42	W 3
x-Charlotte Rage	6	6	.500	3	5	.375	440	509	36.66	42.42	L 2
x-Miami Hooters	5	7	.417	3	5	.375	258	491	21.5	40.92	W 2
x-Albany Firebirds	5	7	.417	3	5	.375	482	490	40.16	40.83	W 1

z – clinched homefield advantage

y – clinched division title

x – clinched playoff spot

== Playoffs ==
Round	Date	Opponent	Results		Game site
Round	Date	Opponent	Final score	Team record	Game site
Semi-finals	August 6	at Orlando Predators	L 13-41	0–1	Orlando Arena
