= Cole Magner =

American football player (born 1982)

Profile
- Position: Wide receiver

Personal information
- Born: November 11, 1982 (age 43); Palmer, Alaska, U.S.
- Listed height: 6 ft 2 in (1.88 m)
- Listed weight: 196 lb (89 kg)

Career information
- High school: Colony (AK)
- College: Bowling Green
- NFL draft: 2005: undrafted

Career history
- Atlanta Falcons (2005)*; Columbus Destroyers (2007); Grand Rapids Rampage (2008)
- * Offseason or practice squad member only

Career AFL statistics
- Receptions: 73
- Receiving yards: 784
- Receiving touchdowns: 14
- Stats at ArenaFan.com

Cole Magner (born November 11, 1982) is an American former football wide receiver in the Arena Football League (AFL) who played for the Columbus Destroyers, and Grand Rapids Rampage. He played college football for the Bowling Green Falcons.

== College career ==
=== Football ===
Magner finished his career the all-time leader in receptions at 215. He finished his career sixth on the Falcons all-time receiving yards list with 2,385 yards and fifth in touchdown receptions with 18. In 2003, he caught a school record 99 receptions and was just the second player in school history to go over the 1,000-yard receiving mark in a single season. Against Ohio State he recorded a career high 13 receptions for 168 yards and one touchdown. He was given the nickname 'Ice Cold Magner' from head coach Urban Meyer.

=== Basketball ===
Manger was also a member of the Bowling Green Falcons basketball team. On March 5, 2003, Magner scored a season high eight points, eight rebounds, six steals and four assists off the bench in 33 minutes played in a victory against Miami (OH). His performance helped head coach Dan Dakich his 100th career victory. Magner was also second on the team in three point percentage at .429%, making 12-of-27 attempts.

=== Football statistics ===
Season	Team	Games		Passing							Receiving				Rushing				Kick return				Punt return			
Season	Team	GP	GS	Cmp	Att	Pct	Yds	TD	Int	Rate	Rec	Yds	Avg	TD	Att	Yds	Avg	TD	Ret	Yds	Avg	TD	Ret	Yds	Avg	TD
2001	Bowling Green	11	1	4	8	50.0	39	1	0	132.2	13	127	9.8	0	22	117	5.3	1	3	97	32.3	0	—	—	—	—
2002	Bowling Green	12	12	3	5	60.0	74	3	0	382.3	26	374	14.4	2	11	81	7.4	1	2	16	8.0	0	—	7	—	0
2003	Bowling Green	14	14	1	4	25.0	48	1	1	158.3	99	1,138	11.5	10	20	87	4.4	0	18	357	19.8	0	4	10	2.5	0
2004	Bowling Green	12	12	—	—	—	—	—	—	—	77	746	9.7	6	4	-3	-3.0	0	5	92	18.4	0	—	—	—	—
Career		49	39	8	17	47.1	161	5	1	211.9	215	2,385	11.1	18	57	282	4.9	2	28	562	20.1	0	4	17	4.3	0

=== Basketball statistics ===
Year	Team	GP	GS	MPG	FG%	3P%	FT%	RPG	APG	SPG	BPG	PPG
2002–03	Bowling Green	15	0	14.9	.390	.429	.800	1.7	1.3	1.5	0.1	3.2
2003–04	Bowling Green	5	0	9.0	.444	.333	.500	1.4	0.8	.4	0.0	2.2
Career		20	0	13.5	.400	.375	.714	1.7	1.2	1.2	.1	3.0

== Professional career ==
Pre-draft measurables
Height	Weight	40-yard dash	20-yard shuttle	Three-cone drill	Vertical jump	Broad jump
6 ft 1 in (1.85 m)	196 lb (89 kg)	4.56 s	3.91 s	6.43 s	32.0 in (0.81 m)	9 ft 7 in (2.92 m)
All values from Pro Day

=== Atlanta Falcons ===
Magner signed with the Atlanta Falcons as an undrafted free agent following the 2005 NFL draft. He participated in their 2005 and 2006 training camp. Magner also played in the 2005 American Bowl in the Tokyo Dome against the Indianapolis Colts. Over five preseason games, Magner had five receptions for 55 yards. He also returned six punts for 76 yards, including a long of 25.

=== Columbus Destroyers ===
On October 6, 2006 Magner was signed by the Columbus Destroyers of the Arena Football League. In the ArenaBowl XXI, Magner caught seven passes for 68 yards and one touchdown against the San Jose SaberCats.

=== Grand Rapids Rampage ===
In 10 games during the 2008 season, he caught 69 passes for 740 yards and 12 touchdowns. In week 11, he had career high 15 receptions for 175 yards and two touchdowns against the Tampa Bay Storm. In the postseason, he had 32 receptions for 268 yards and five touchdowns.

=== Cleveland Gladiators ===
In 2010, Magner was assigned to the Cleveland Gladiators of the AF1.

=== Professional statistics ===
Regular season

Season	Team	Games	Receiving				Rushing			
Season	Team	GP	Rec	Yds	Avg	TD	Att	Yds	Avg	TD
2007	Columbus	1	4	44	11.0	2	—	—	—	—
2008	Grand Rapids	10	69	740	10.7	12	2	10	5.0	1
Career		11	73	784	10.7	14	2	10	5.0	1

Playoffs

Season	Team	Games	Receiving				Rushing			
Season	Team	GP	Rec	Yds	Avg	TD	Att	Yds	Avg	TD
2007	Columbus	2	12	107	8.9	2	—	—	—	—
2008	Grand Rapids	3	32	268	8.4	5	2	2	1.0	0
Career		5	44	375	8.75	7	2	2	1.0	0
