= 1993 Cincinnati Rockers season =

Arena Football League team season

- Head coach: Joe Haering
- Home stadium: Riverfront Coliseum

Results
- Record: 2–10
- Division place: 5th
- Playoffs: Did not qualify

The 1993 Cincinnati Rockers season was the second, and what turned out to be the final season for the arena football franchise. The Rockers finished 2–10 and failed to make the playoffs.

== Regular season ==
=== Schedule ===
Week	Date	Opponent	Results		Game site
Week	Date	Opponent	Final score	Team record	Game site
1	May 15	at Dallas Texans	L 33–40	0–1	Reunion Arena
2	May 22	Detroit Drive	L 35–40	0–2	Riverfront Coliseum
3	May 29	Orlando Predators	L 16–37	0–3	Riverfront Coliseum
4	June 4	at Detroit Drive	L 19–38	0–4	Joe Louis Arena
5	June 12	Cleveland Thunderbolts	L 19–45	0–5	Riverfront Coliseum
6	June 19	at Cleveland Thunderbolts	W 42–34	1–5	Richfield Coliseum
7	June 26	Arizona Rattlers	L 26–27	1–6	Riverfront Coliseum
8	July 2	at Tampa Bay Storm	L 51–61	1–7	Florida Suncoast Dome
9	July 10	Miami Hooters	L 51–59	1–8	Riverfront Coliseum
10	July 17	at Albany Firebirds	L 9–50	1–9	Knickerbocker Arena
11	July 23	at Arizona Rattlers	L 43–51	1–10	America West Arena
12	July 31	Dallas Texans	L 33–40	2–10	Riverfront Coliseum

=== Standings ===
1993 Arena Football League standings
Team	Overall			Conference			Scoring				
Team	W	L	PCT	W	L	PCT	PF	PA	PF (Avg.)	PA (Avg.)	STK
American Conference
xyz-Detroit Drive	11	1	.917	8	0	1.000	506	372	42.1	31	W 4
x-Arizona Rattlers	7	5	.583	6	2	.750	486	489	40.5	40.75	L 1
x-Dallas Texans	3	9	.250	2	6	.250	454	551	37.83	45.92	L 5
Cleveland Thunderbolts	2	10	.167	2	6	.250	357	484	29.75	40.33	L 7
Cincinnati Rockers	2	10	.167	2	6	.250	394	525	32.83	43.75	W 1
National Conference
xy-Orlando Predators	10	2	.833	6	2	.750	526	355	43.83	29.58	L 1
x-Tampa Bay Storm	9	3	.750	5	3	.625	571	389	47.58	32.42	W 3
x-Charlotte Rage	6	6	.500	3	5	.375	440	509	36.66	42.42	L 2
x-Miami Hooters	5	7	.417	3	5	.375	258	491	21.5	40.92	W 2
x-Albany Firebirds	5	7	.417	3	5	.375	482	490	40.16	40.83	W 1

z – clinched homefield advantage

y – clinched division title

x – clinched playoff spot

== Roster ==
1993 Cincinnati Rockers roster
Quarterbacks: -- Blair Kiel; -- Brent Pease; -- David Riley; Wide Receivers/Defensive Backs: -- Charley Bowen; -- Brad Calip; -- Richard Carey; -- Wayne Coffey; 84 Ira Hillary; -- Joe Johnson; -- Bruce LaSane; 1 Gary Mullen; -- Bobby Roland	Fullbacks/Linebackers: -- John Clark; 32 Mel Mills; 34 Dan Sellers; Offensive Linemen/Defensive Linemen: -- Kevin Allen; -- Joe Brunson; -- Kevin Carroll; -- Lamar Davis; -- John Dixon; -- David Edeen; -- Cecil Fletcher; -- Steve Houghton; -- Jerry Renners; -- Mick Roessler; -- Craig Schlichting; -- Steve Slay	Wide Receiver/Linebackers: -- Falanda Newton; Kickers: -- Rusty Fricke; Rookies in italics Roster updated July 15, 2013; 29 Active, 0 Inactive, 0 PS → More rosters

== All-Star selections ==
Position	Player
Fullback/Linebacker	Dan Sellers
Wide Receiver/Defensive Back	Richard Carey
Wide Receiver/Defensive Back	Gary Mullen
