= Freddie Solomon (American football, born 1972) =

American football player (born 1972)

Freddie Lee Solomon
No. 84, 81
- Position: Wide receiver

Personal information
- Born: August 15, 1972 (age 54); Gainesville, Florida, U.S.
- Listed height: 5 ft 10 in (1.78 m)
- Listed weight: 180 lb (82 kg)

Career information
- High school: Santa Fe (Alachua, Florida)
- College: South Carolina State
- NFL draft: 1995: undrafted
- Expansion draft: 1999: 1st round, 33rd overall pick

Career history
- Philadelphia Eagles (1995–1998); Cleveland Browns (1999)*; Tampa Bay Storm (2003–2006); Columbus Destroyers (2007)
- * Offseason or practice squad member only

Awards and highlights
- ArenaBowl champion (2003)

Career NFL statistics
- Receptions: 58
- Receiving yards: 773
- Receiving touchdowns: 4
- Stats at Pro Football Reference

Career AFL statistics
- Receptions: 366
- Receiving yards: 4,880
- Touchdowns: 95
- Stats at ArenaFan.com

Freddie Lee Solomon Jr. (born August 15, 1972) is an American former professional football player who was a wide receiver for three seasons with the Philadelphia Eagles of the National Football League (NFL). He played college football for the South Carolina State Bulldogs. After playing in the NFL, he continued his career in the Arena Football League (AFL) from 2003 to 2007 with the Tampa Bay Storm and Columbus Destroyers, compiling 366 receptions for 4,880 yards and 95 touchdowns.
