= Colony High School =

Colony High School may refer to:

- Colony High School (Alaska), a high school in Palmer, Alaska
- Colony High School (California), a high school in Ontario, California
- The Colony High School, a high school in The Colony, Texas
