= Lawrence Samuels =

American football player and coach (born 1970)

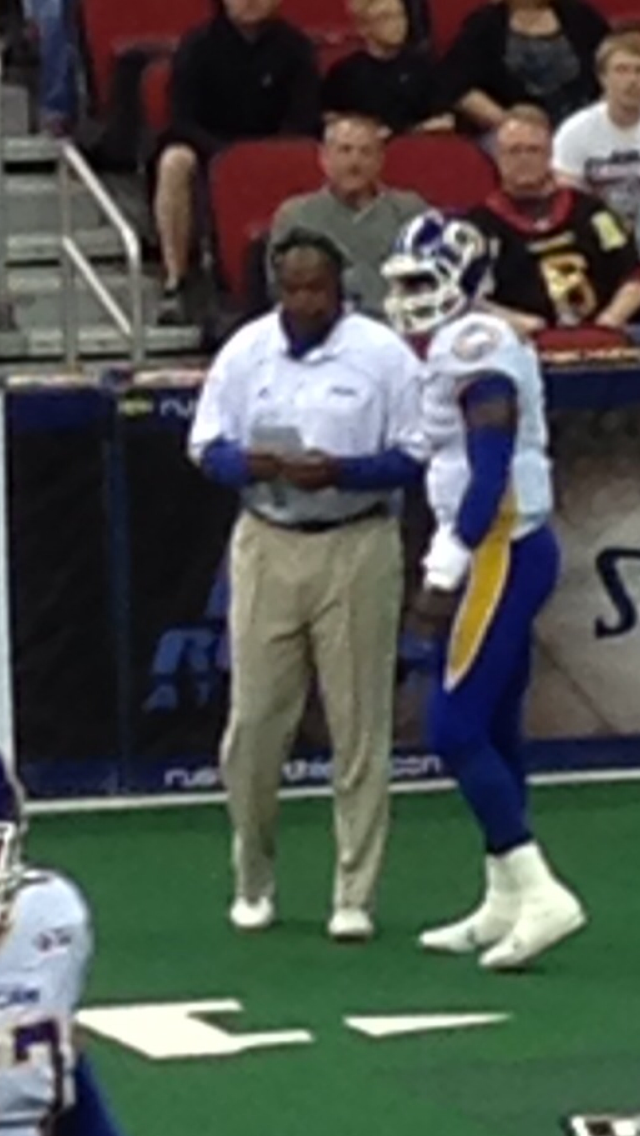
- Samuels with Adrian McPherson during a 2013 game.

Profile
- Position: Head coach

Personal information
- Born: May 1, 1970 (age 56); Mobile, Alabama, U.S.
- Listed height: 6 ft 2 in (1.88 m)
- Listed weight: 215 lb (98 kg)

Career information
- High school: Mobile (AL) Shaw
- College: Livingston (AL)

Career history

Playing
- Tampa Bay Storm (1994–2000); New Jersey Gladiators (2001); Tampa Bay Storm (2002–2010)

Coaching
- West Alabama (WR) (1993–1994); West Alabama (WR) (1998–2000); Central H.S. (WR/OL) (2002–2003); Sickles H.S. (WR/DB) (2004–2005); Wharton H.S. (WR) (2005–2006); Team USA (WR) (2009); East Lake H.S. (WR/DB) (2009–2010); Central State (WR) (2011); Tampa Bay Storm (WR) (2012); Tampa Bay Storm (OC) (2013); Tampa Bay Storm (HC) (2014–2016); Tuskegee Golden Tigers (TE) (2017–present)

Awards and highlights
- 3× ArenaBowl champion (1995, 1996, 2003); ArenaBowl MVP (2003); 5× Second-team All-Arena (2003, 2004, 2005, 2006, 2007); 4× AFL All-Iron Man Team (2000, 2003, 2007, 2008); Arena Football Hall of Fame (2013)

Career AFL statistics
- Receptions: 1,035
- Receiving yards: 11,820
- Receiving touchdowns: 169
- Total tackles: 360
- Interceptions: 32
- Stats at ArenaFan.com

Head coaching record
- Regular season: 17–35 (.327)
- Postseason: 0–0 (.000)
- Career: 17–36 (.321)

Lawrence "Law Dogg" Samuels (born May 1, 1970) is an American football coach and former player. He played college football at Livingston University, and was an Arena Football League (AFL) wide receiver/linebacker from 1994 to 2010. He was head coach of the Tampa Bay Storm of the AFL from 2014 to 2016.

== Early life ==
Born in Mobile, Alabama, Samuels attended Shaw High School in Mobile. Samuels was a basketball player in high school, but was lured to the football field after seeing most of his childhood friends join the Shaw team.

Samuels received both his Bachelor of Science degree in industrial technology and Master of Science degree in education from The University of West Alabama.

== Professional career ==
=== Tampa Bay Storm ===
Samuels made his AFL debut in 1994 with the Tampa Bay Storm, racking up 247 receptions through the 2000 season for over 3,120 yards in his first tenure with the Storm.

=== New Jersey Gladiators ===
In 2001, Samuels left the Storm and played the season with the New Jersey Gladiators, catching 65 passes (a career high at the time) for 742 yards, just short of his 844-yard career high receiving season he recorded the year before with Tampa Bay.

=== Return to the Storm ===
After a single season in New Jersey, Samuels returned to Tampa, where he finished his playing career. From 2003-2007, Samuels notched 1,000+ yards receiving in 4 of 5 seasons, including back-to-back-to-back 1,100 yard+ seasons in 2005, 2006, and 2007. Was named MVP and Ironman of ArenaBowl XVII.

In 2007, after 5 losses to begin the season, Samuels was again named to the AFL's All-Ironman Team after leading the Storm to a #3 seed in the playoffs. 100+ catches, 1,000+ yards, and 100+ touchdowns also helped Samuels earn the honor.

On June 15, 2008, Samuels became the first receiver in AFL history to record 1,000 career receptions.

On August 10, 2013, Samuels was inducted into the AFL Hall of Fame.

== Coaching career ==
In 2002 and 2003, Samuels was an assistant coach and wide receivers coach at Central High School in Brooksville, Florida.

Samuels was the offensive coordinator and receivers coach for the Wharton High School Wildcats during the 2005 and 2006 seasons.

In 2011, Samuels was named the offensive coordinator of the Storm, working with one of his former coaches, Dave Ewart.

Ewart was fired in early August 2013, and on September 5, 2013, Samuels was promoted to head coach of the Storm. Samuels and the Storm mutually agreed to part ways in August 2016.

In 2017, Samuels was hired as the tight ends coach at Tuskegee University.

=== Head coaching record ===
Team	Year	Regular season				Postseason			
Team	Year	Won	Lost	Win %	Finish	Won	Lost	Win %	Result
TB	2014	8	10	.444	2nd in AC South	–	–	–	–
TB	2015	7	11	.389	3rd in AC South	–	–	–	–
TB	2016	2	14	.125	4th in AC	0	1	.000	Lost to Philadelphia Soul in Conference Semifinals
Total		17	35	.327		0	1	.000	

== Personal ==
Samuels's brother, Chris Samuels, was a six-time Pro-Bowler in the National Football League (NFL). He and his wife, Kelli, have two daughters.
