= Kelvin Kinney =

American football player (born 1972)

No. 97, 92, 98, 1
- Positions: Defensive end, tight end

Personal information
- Born: December 31, 1972 (age 53); Montgomery, West Virginia, U.S.
- Listed height: 6 ft 6 in (1.98 m)
- Listed weight: 264 lb (120 kg)

Career information
- High school: Louisa (Louisa, Virginia)
- College: Virginia State
- NFL draft: 1996: 6th round, 174th overall pick

Career history
- Washington Redskins (1996–1998); Detroit Lions (1999)*; San Jose SaberCats (2000); Las Vegas Outlaws (2001); Detroit Fury (2001); Toronto Argonauts (2001); Detroit Fury (2002); Edmonton Eskimos (2002); Tampa Bay Storm (2003); Toronto Argonauts (2003); Edmonton Eskimos (2003); Tampa Bay Storm (2004); Edmonton Eskimos (2004); Tampa Bay Storm (2005); Columbus Destroyers (2006–2008); Tampa Bay Storm (2008), (2010); Dallas Vigilantes (2011)
- * Offseason or practice squad member only

Awards and highlights
- Arena Bowl champion (2003); Grey Cup champion (2003)

Career NFL statistics
- Tackles: 38
- Sacks: 1
- Stats at Pro Football Reference

Career AFL statistics
- Tackles: 117
- Sacks: 26.5
- Forced fumbles: 9
- Stats at ArenaFan.com

Kelvin Lamonta Kinney (born December 31, 1972) is an American former professional football player who was a defensive lineman in the National Football League (NFL) and Canadian Football League (CFL). His nickname is K2.

Kinney was a defensive end in the NFL for the Washington Redskins, who selected him in the sixth round of the 1996 NFL draft with the 174th overall pick. He also had professional experience in the now defunct XFL (where he led the league in quarterback sacks). He played college football for the Virginia State Trojans.
