= Willie Fears =

American gridiron football player (born 1964)

No. 96, 91
- Position: Defensive end

Personal information
- Born: June 4, 1964 (age 62); Chicago, Illinois, U.S.
- Listed height: 6 ft 3 in (1.91 m)
- Listed weight: 278 lb (126 kg)

Career information
- College: Northwestern State
- NFL draft: 1986: undrafted

Career history
- Ottawa Rough Riders (1986)*; Miami Dolphins (1986)*; Cincinnati Bengals (1987); Winnipeg Blue Bombers (1988); Toronto Argonauts (1989); Ottawa Rough Riders (1989); Minnesota Vikings (1990); San Antonio Riders (1992); Cleveland Thunderbolts (1992–1993); Sacramento Gold Miners (1994); San Antonio Texans (1995); Tampa Bay Storm (1996); Nashville Kats (1997)
- * Offseason or practice squad member only

Awards and highlights
- Grey Cup champion (1988); ArenaBowl champion (1996)
- Stats at Pro Football Reference
- Stats at ArenaFan.com

Willie Bert Fears Jr. (born June 4, 1964) is an American former professional football player who was a defensive lineman in the National Football League (NFL) and the World League of American Football (WLAF). He played for the Cincinnati Bengals and Minnesota Vikings of the NFL, and the San Antonio Riders of the WLAF. Fears played collegiately at Northwestern State University. Fears also played for the Cleveland Thunderbolts, the Tampa Bay Storm and the Nashville Kats of the Arena Football League. He was named First-team All-Arena in 1993.
