= Andre Bowden =

American football player (born 1968)

No. 30
- Position: Fullback / Linebacker

Personal information
- Born: April 4, 1968 (age 58); Fuquay-Varina, North Carolina, U.S.
- Listed height: 6 ft 2 in (1.88 m)
- Listed weight: 260 lb (118 kg)

Career information
- College: Fayetteville State

Career history
- Tampa Bay Storm (1991–1993); New Orleans Saints (1994)*; New England Patriots (1994–1995); Frankfurt Galaxy (1997); Tampa Bay Storm (1997–2001); Carolina Cobras (2002); Tampa Bay Storm (2003–2004)
- * Offseason or practice squad member only

Awards and highlights
- 3× ArenaBowl champion (1991, 1993, 2003); 3× First-team All-Arena (1993, 1999, 2001); AFL All-Ironman Team (2000); AFL All Star (1993); Arena Football League 15th Anniversary Team; Arena Football Hall of Fame inductee (2014)
- Stats at ArenaFan.com

Andre Bowden (born April 4, 1968) is an American former professional fullback and linebacker in the Arena Football League (AFL) and became the all-time leading rusher for the Tampa Bay Storm from 1993-1994, 1997-2001, 2003-2004.

Bowden played college football for Fayetteville State University.

Bowden was also in the National Football League (NFL). He was with the New England Patriots in the 1994 and 1995 seasons, but did not see any playing time. On March 23, 2002, Bowden signed with the Carolina Cobras.
