= Les Barley =

American gridiron football player (born 1967)

Profile
- Positions: Fullback, linebacker

Personal information
- Born: September 7, 1967 (age 59); Gretna, Virginia, U.S.
- Listed height: 6 ft 2 in (1.88 m)
- Listed weight: 240 lb (109 kg)

Career information
- High school: Gretna
- College: Winston-Salem State
- NFL draft: 1990: undrafted

Career history

Playing
- Saskatchewan Roughriders (1991)*; Carolina Cougars (1992)*; Charlotte Rage (1992–1993); Tampa Bay Storm (1993–1994); Connecticut Coyotes (1995–1996); Charlotte Rage (1996); Tampa Bay Storm (1997–1999); Grand Rapids Rampage (2000); Milwaukee Mustangs (2001)
- * Offseason or practice squad member only

Coaching
- Winston-Salem State (1990–1991) Graduate assistant; Rock Hill HS (SC) (1992) Assistant coach

Awards and highlights
- ArenaBowl champion (1993); First-team All-Arena (1995); Second-team All-Arena (1998)
- Stats at ArenaFan.com

Leslie Barley (born September 7, 1967) is an American former professional football fullback and linebacker who played in the Arena Football League (AFL). In a career lasting ten years, he played for the Charlotte Rage, Connecticut Coyotes, Tampa Bay Storm, Grand Rapids Rampage and Milwaukee Mustangs. He played college football at Winston-Salem State University. He was named first-team All-Arena in 1995 and second-team All-Arena in 1998.

== Early life ==
Barley was born on September 7, 1967, in Gretna, Virginia. He started playing football as an eighth grader at Gretna Junior High School. Though initially designated as a lineman, he was converted to running back after the coaches his performances on the track team.

Barley attended Gretna High School, where he participated in football, basketball, wrestling, and track and field. On the football team, he starred at running back while lining up as a linebacker on defense. Barley earned honorable mention all-district honors as a sophomore before earning second-team all-district honors on both offense and defense as a junior. As a senior, he led the team with 108 tackles while registering 1,049 yards and seven touchdowns on offense, again earning first-team all-district honors at both positions. The Gretna Hawks went 1–9 and 2–8 in his final two seasons, respectively.

Aside from football, Barley participated in track and field all four years at Gretna, setting multiple school records. He regularly competed in six events (shot put, discus throw, triple jump, 100 yards, 220 yards, and the relay race), though he competed in other events, such as the long jump or the hurdles, as needed. Barley won two district titles and one regional title in the discus throw. As a senior, he won the regional title in the triple jump and ran a leg in the 400-yard relay team that finished second in the state. Additionally, Barley won two district titles at 185 lbs. before Gretna cancelled its wrestling program. Instead, he played on the basketball team as a senior, a sport he had not played since his freshman year.

Barley is the type of athlete a rural school gets once every 10 years, so there's no replacing him. We probably won't have a kid his size with his speed for a long time.

— Gretna head football coach Ken Meadors in 1986

Barley was considered an NCAA Division I prospect in football, but his SAT scores did not meet the minimum requirements to play Division I sports, which were set by Prop 48. He chose to attend Winston-Salem State University, a Division II school which did not fall under the same guidelines at the time, over offers from Maryland, Virginia, Elon, and Ferrum.

== College career ==
Barley arrived at Winston-Salem State as a running back, but quickly asked to move to linebacker due to the amount of running backs on the team. He recorded 19 sacks and 407 tackles in his college career. Barley earned his bachelor's degree in physical education and later returned to the school to earn his master's degree in sports management in 1998.

== Professional career ==
After going unselected in the 1990 NFL draft, Barley spent a year out of football. In June 1991, he was signed by the Saskatchewan Roughriders of the Canadian Football League (CFL) after impressing their coaching staff at a free agent camp in Shreveport, Louisiana. Barley was released before the start of the regular season.

Barley joined the Carolina Cougars of the Professional Spring Football League (PSFL) ahead of the inaugural 1992 PSFL season, though the league folded before playing a game. He signed with the Charlotte Rage of the Arena Football League (AFL) a few months later. As a rookie, Barley was second in the league with 264 rushing yards and ten touchdowns. Ahead of the 1993 season, he was loaned out to the Tampa Bay Storm for an exhibition game against the Detroit Drive in Frankfurt, Germany. Barley rushed for 52 yards on five carries and caught a touchdown in the Storm's 43–35 win, and was named the game's most valuable player. Upon his return to the Rage, Barley rushed for 42 yards and one touchdown before he was permanently acquired by the Storm in a midseason trade for receiver Anthony Howard. In ArenaBowl VII, Barley rushed for a record 49 yards and a touchdown to help the Storm defeat the Detroit Drive, 51–31. He was elected team captain ahead of the 1994 season, moving into the starting fullback role after the departure of Andre Bowden.

Ahead of the 1995 season, Barley was traded to the Connecticut Coyotes, one of the five AFL expansion teams. In his first year with the Coyotes, he rushed for 118 yards and seven touchdowns, and caught 11 passes for 118 yards and one touchdown. He also registered 17 tackles, two sacks, four forced fumbles, and two fumble recoveries on defense, earning first-team All-Arena honors. In the 1996 home opener on May 3, Barley rushed for a score and caught another one to help the Coyotes to a 68–34 victory over the Memphis Pharaohs – the first home win in franchise history. He was traded to the Charlotte Rage a few weeks later in exchange for Billy Owens and Reggie Robinson. Barley returned to the Tampa Bay Storm in 1997 after the disappearance of the Charlotte Rage. That season, he rushed for 183 yards and eight touchdowns on 43 carries.

On May 23, 1998, in a game against the Florida Bobcats, Barley became the first player in AFL history to surpass the 1,000-yard career mark. That season, he earned second-team All-Arena honors after rushing for 232 yards and a league-leading 15 touchdowns and registering 30 total tackles, eight sacks, three forced fumbles, and three fumble recoveries on defense. Barley finished his career with the Grand Rapids Rampage in 2000 and the Milwaukee Mustangs in 2001.

Barley finished his career as the AFL's all-time leading rusher with 1,382 rushing yards on 425 carries. He held the record until it was broken in 2006 by Bob McMillen.

== Coaching career ==
In 1992, Barley was hired as an assistant football coach at Rock Hill High School in Rock Hill, South Carolina. He had previously served as a part-time assistant coach at his alma mater, Winston-Salem State, for two years.
