= Dave Ewart =

American football player and coach (born 1969)

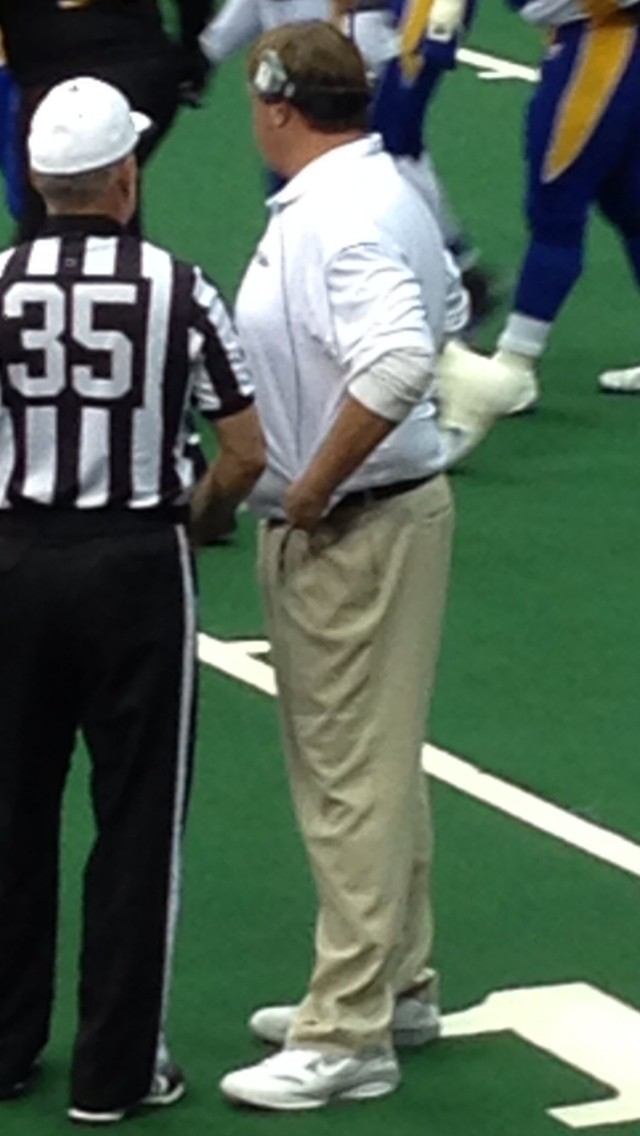
- Ewart during a 2013 game

Jacksonville Sharks
- Title: Assistant head coach

Personal information
- Born: March 30, 1969 (age 57)

Career information
- College: East Tennessee State
- NFL draft: 1991: undrafted

Career history
- East Tennessee State (1991) Offensive line coach; Glenville State College (1992–1993) Defensive line coach / special teams coordinator; Cleveland Thunderbolts (1994) Defensive & offensive coordinator / defensive line coach; St. Louis Stampede (1995) Defensive coordinator; St. Louis Stampede (1996) Head coach; Texas Terror (1997) Head coach; Florida Bobcats (1998) Defensive & offensive coordinator / defensive line coach; New England Sea Wolves (1999) Assistant; Florida Bobcats (2000–2001) Head coach; Tampa Bay Storm (2002–2010) Assistant; Tampa Bay Storm (2011–2013) Head coach; Arizona Rattlers (2014–2016) Defensive coordinator; Jacksonville Sharks (2018–present) Assistant head coach

Awards and highlights
- 2× ArenaBowl champion (2003, 2014); 2× All-Southern Conference Team (1989 & 1990); 1-AA All-American (1990)

Head coaching record
- Regular season: 46–65 (.414)
- Postseason: 0–2 (.000)
- Career: 46–67 (.407)

David Ewart (born March 30, 1969) is the assistant head coach for the Jacksonville Sharks of the National Arena League (NAL).

== College career ==
Ewart attended Salem International University from 1987 to 1988 playing as an offensive lineman on the Tigers football team before transferring to East Tennessee State University. During his years at East Tennessee State, Ewart was twice named an All-Southern Conference selection and was a Division-1AA All-American selection.

== Coaching career ==
=== Tampa Bay Storm ===
Ewart served as an assistant under Tim Marcum for seven seasons with the Tampa Bay Storm, Ewart was named the Storm's 6th Head Coach in team history on February 17, 2011. After two losing seasons, the Storm were putting together a promising 7-4 season in 2013, when quarterback Adrian McPherson was injured. The Storm went on to lose seven straight games to end the season, but still made the playoffs. This was the first time the Storm made the playoffs under Ewart. The Storm lost their first round playoff game, and with the team's eighth straight loss, the Storm fired Ewart.

=== Arizona Rattlers ===
Ewart was Arizona Rattlers' defensive coordinator from 2014 to 2016.

=== Head coaching record ===
Team	Year	Regular season					Postseason			
Team	Year	Won	Lost	Ties	Win %	Finish	Won	Lost	Win %	Result
STL	1996	6	4	0	.600	3rd in Central	0	1	.000	Lost to Iowa Barnstormers in AFL Quarterfinals
TEX	1997	6	8	0	.429	3rd in Central	-	-	-	-
FLA	2000	3	11	0	.214	5th in Southern	-	-	-	-
FLA	2001	6	8	0	.429	4th in Southern	-	-	-	-
FLA total		9	19	0	.321	-	-	-	-	
TB	2005	1	1	0	.500	3rd in Southern	-	-	-	-
TB	2006	2	1	0	.666	4th in Southern	-	-	-	-
TB	2011	7	11	0	.388	4th in Southern	-	-	-	-
TB	2012	8	10	0	.444	4th in Southern	-	-	-	-
TB	2013	7	11	0	.388	3rd in Southern	0	1	.000	Lost to Jacksonville Sharks in Conference semifinals
TB total		25	34	0	.424	-	0	1	.000	
Total		46	65	0	.414		0	2	.000	
