= 1993 Albany Firebirds season =

Arena Football League team season

- Head coach: Rick Buffington
- Home stadium: Knickerbocker Arena

Results
- Record: 5–7
- Division place: 5th
- Playoffs: L 1st Round vs. Tampa Bay Storm

The 1993 Albany Firebirds season was the fourth season for the Firebirds. They finished 5–7 and lost in the 1st round of the AFL playoffs to the Tampa Bay Storm.

== Regular season ==
=== Schedule ===
| Week | Date | Opponent | Results | | Game site |
| Week | Date | Opponent | Final score | Team record | Game site |
|---|---|---|---|---|---|
| 1 | May 14 | at Orlando Predators | L 30-40 | 0-1 | Orlando Arena |
| 2 | May 22 | Miami Hooters | W 52-23 | 1–1 | Knickerbocker Arena |
| 3 | May 28 | at Charlotte Rage | L 40-65 | 1-2 | Charlotte Coliseum |
| 4 | June 5 | Arizona Rattlers | L 50-54 | 1-3 | Knickerbocker Arena |
| 5 | June 12 | at Dallas Texans | W 44-38 | 2-3 | Reunion Arena |
| 6 | June 19 | Charlotte Rage | W 61-34 | 3-3 | Knickerbocker Arena |
| 7 | June 26 | Tampa Bay Storm | L 33-36 | 3-4 | Knickerbocker Arena |
| 8 | July 2 | at Miami Hooters | L 27-43 | 3-5 | Miami Arena |
| 9 | July 9 | at Detroit Drive | L 19-65 | 3-6 | Joe Louis Arena |
| 10 | July 17 | Cincinnati Rockers | W 50-9 | 4-6 | Knickerbocker Arena |
| 11 | July 24 | at Tampa Bay Storm | L 26-48 | 4-7 | Florida Suncoast Dome |
| 12 | July 31 | Orlando Predators | W 49-35 | 5-7 | Knickerbocker Arena |

=== Standings ===
1993 Arena Football League standings
| Team | Overall | | | Conference | | | Scoring | | | | |
| Team | W | L | PCT | W | L | PCT | PF | PA | PF (Avg.) | PA (Avg.) | STK |
|---|---|---|---|---|---|---|---|---|---|---|---|
American Conference
| xyz-Detroit Drive | 11 | 1 | .917 | 8 | 0 | 1.000 | 506 | 372 | 42.1 | 31 | W 4 |
| x-Arizona Rattlers | 7 | 5 | .583 | 6 | 2 | .750 | 486 | 489 | 40.5 | 40.75 | L 1 |
| x-Dallas Texans | 3 | 9 | .250 | 2 | 6 | .250 | 454 | 551 | 37.83 | 45.92 | L 5 |
| Cleveland Thunderbolts | 2 | 10 | .167 | 2 | 6 | .250 | 357 | 484 | 29.75 | 40.33 | L 7 |
| Cincinnati Rockers | 2 | 10 | .167 | 2 | 6 | .250 | 394 | 525 | 32.83 | 43.75 | W 1 |
National Conference
| xy-Orlando Predators | 10 | 2 | .833 | 6 | 2 | .750 | 526 | 355 | 43.83 | 29.58 | L 1 |
| x-Tampa Bay Storm | 9 | 3 | .750 | 5 | 3 | .625 | 571 | 389 | 47.58 | 32.42 | W 3 |
| x-Charlotte Rage | 6 | 6 | .500 | 3 | 5 | .375 | 440 | 509 | 36.66 | 42.42 | L 2 |
| x-Miami Hooters | 5 | 7 | .417 | 3 | 5 | .375 | 258 | 491 | 21.5 | 40.92 | W 2 |
| x-Albany Firebirds | 5 | 7 | .417 | 3 | 5 | .375 | 482 | 490 | 40.16 | 40.83 | W 1 |

z – clinched homefield advantage

y – clinched division title

x – clinched playoff spot

== Playoffs ==
| Round | Date | Opponent | Results | | Game site |
| Round | Date | Opponent | Final score | Team record | Game site |
|---|---|---|---|---|---|
| Semi-finals | August 8 | at Tampa Bay Storm | L 45–48 | 0–1 | Florida Suncoast Dome |
