= 1993 Dallas Texans season =

Arena Football League team season

1993 Dallas Texans (arena football) season
- Owner: Kent Kramer; Greg Gibson
- Head coach: Jerry Trice
- Home stadium: Reunion Arena

Results
- Record: 3–9
- Conference place: 3rd
- Playoffs: Lost 1st Round (Drive) 6–51

The 1993 Dallas Texans season was the fourth and what would become their final season for the Texans. They finished with a record of 3–9, finishing 3rd in the American Conference. The Texans would lose the first round playoff game vs the Detroit Drive.

== Regular season ==
=== Schedule ===
| Week | Date | Opponent | Results | | Game site |
| Week | Date | Opponent | Final score | Team record | Game site |
|---|---|---|---|---|---|
| 1 | May 15 | Cincinnati Rockers | W 40–33 | 1–0 | Reunion Arena |
| 2 | May 22 | Cleveland Thunderbolts | L 43–46 | 1–1 | Reunion Arena |
| 3 | May 28 | at Detroit Drive | L 38–42 | 1–2 | Joe Louis Arena |
| 4 | June 5 | at Cleveland Thunderbolts | W 51–47 | 2–2 | Richfield Coliseum |
| 5 | June 12 | Albany Firebirds | L 38–44 | 2–3 | Reunion Arena |
| 6 | June 18 | Arizona Rattlers | L 40–43 | 2–4 | Reunion Arena |
| 7 | June 25 | at Miami Hooters | W 30–28 (OT) | 3–4 | Miami Arena |
| 8 | July 2 | at Arizona Rattlers | L 45–73 | 3–5 | America West Arena |
| 9 | July 9 | Orlando Predators | L 17–49 | 3–6 | Reunion Arena |
| 10 | July 16 | at Charlotte Rage | L 29–54 | 3–7 | Charlotte Coliseum |
| 11 | July 23 | Detroit Drive | L 40–42 | 3–8 | Reunion Arena |
| 12 | July 31 | at Cincinnati Rockers | L 43–50 | 3–9 | Riverfront Coliseum |

=== Standings ===
1993 Arena Football League standings
| Team | Overall | | | Conference | | | Scoring | | | | |
| Team | W | L | PCT | W | L | PCT | PF | PA | PF (Avg.) | PA (Avg.) | STK |
|---|---|---|---|---|---|---|---|---|---|---|---|
American Conference
| xyz-Detroit Drive | 11 | 1 | .917 | 8 | 0 | 1.000 | 506 | 372 | 42.1 | 31 | W 4 |
| x-Arizona Rattlers | 7 | 5 | .583 | 6 | 2 | .750 | 486 | 489 | 40.5 | 40.75 | L 1 |
| x-Dallas Texans | 3 | 9 | .250 | 2 | 6 | .250 | 454 | 551 | 37.83 | 45.92 | L 5 |
| Cleveland Thunderbolts | 2 | 10 | .167 | 2 | 6 | .250 | 357 | 484 | 29.75 | 40.33 | L 7 |
| Cincinnati Rockers | 2 | 10 | .167 | 2 | 6 | .250 | 394 | 525 | 32.83 | 43.75 | W 1 |
National Conference
| xy-Orlando Predators | 10 | 2 | .833 | 6 | 2 | .750 | 526 | 355 | 43.83 | 29.58 | L 1 |
| x-Tampa Bay Storm | 9 | 3 | .750 | 5 | 3 | .625 | 571 | 389 | 47.58 | 32.42 | W 3 |
| x-Charlotte Rage | 6 | 6 | .500 | 3 | 5 | .375 | 440 | 509 | 36.66 | 42.42 | L 2 |
| x-Miami Hooters | 5 | 7 | .417 | 3 | 5 | .375 | 258 | 491 | 21.5 | 40.92 | W 2 |
| x-Albany Firebirds | 5 | 7 | .417 | 3 | 5 | .375 | 482 | 490 | 40.16 | 40.83 | W 1 |

z – clinched homefield advantage

y – clinched division title

x – clinched playoff spot

== Playoffs ==
| Round | Date | Opponent | Results | | Game site |
| Round | Date | Opponent | Final score | Team record | Game site |
|---|---|---|---|---|---|
| 1 | August 7 | at Detroit Drive | L 6–51 | 0–1 | Joe Louis Arena |

== Roster ==
1993 Dallas Texans roster
| Quarterbacks: -- James Guidry; 5 Todd Hammel; -- Derrick Singleton; Wide Receivers/Defensive Backs: -- Billy Bell; -- Joe Brookins; -- Rod Brown; -- Douglas Craft; -- Steven Harris; -- Robert Kirksey; -- Greg Lewis; -- Darryl Tillman; -- Tyrone Thurman | Fullbacks/Linebackers: -- Terry Bagsby; -- David Chapman; -- Lincoln Coleman; -- Mike Striednig; Offensive Linemen/Defensive Linemen: -- Earl Bell; -- Joe Campbell; -- Steve Clarke; -- Bobby Duncum, Jr.; -- Duane Duncum; 89 Frank Harris; -- Ted Hennings; -- Robin Jones; -- Charles Perry; -- Dwayne Phorne; -- Norman Steele | Wide Receivers/Linebackers: -- Gary Compton; -- Kelvin Edwards; 88 Sam Moore; Kickers: -- Mike Brown; -- Ian Howfield; -- Scott Segrist; Rookies in italics Roster updated July 25, 2013; 33 Active, 0 Inactive, 0 PS → More rosters |
