= John Zinser (American football) =

American football player (born 1967)

Profile
- Position: Offensive lineman/Defensive lineman

Personal information
- Born: February 21, 1967 (age 59)
- Listed height: 6 ft 3 in (1.91 m)
- Listed weight: 280 lb (127 kg)

Career information
- College: Penn

Career history
- Albany Firebirds (1991); Arizona Rattlers (1992–1993); Miami Hooters (1993); Massachusetts Marauders (1994); Charlotte Rage (1995–1996); New Jersey Red Dogs (1997); Grand Rapids Rampage (1998–1999)
- Stats at ArenaFan.com

John Zinser (born February 21, 1967) is an American former professional football player and coach in the Arena Football League (AFL). He played college football for the Penn Quakers.

== College career ==
Zinser is from New Fairfield, Connecticut. He attended college at the University of Pennsylvania. He was named to Div. I-AA All-American and All-Ivy League team in 1988. He played both offensive and defensive line.

== Professional career ==
In 1989, Zinser attended training camp with the Philadelphia Eagles.

Zinser spent nine seasons in the Arena Football League for seven teams.

In 1991 John was a member of the Albany Firebirds. He played for the Arizona Rattlers for the '92 and '93 season. Also he in the 1993 season he played for the Miami Hooters. In the 1994 season he again changed uniforms and played for the Massachusetts Marauders. He was later signed by the Charlotte Rage and stayed there for two seasons. In 1997, he was on the New Jersey Red Dogs. The Grand Rapids Rampage signed him for the 1998 season and was resigned in 1999.

== Coaching career ==
In 2000 Zinser became a member of the Grand Rapids Rampage Coaching Staff. He was the line coach for the New Jersey Gladiators (2001) and the Mohegan Wolves (2003). In 2004, he was the offensive coordinator for the Philadelphia Soul. In 2006, he was the offensive coordinator, line coach and player personnel director for the Las Vegas Gladiators. In 2008, he was named to the Columbus Destroyers coaching staff.
