= Rod McSwain =

American football player (born 1962)

No. 23, 22
- Position: Cornerback

Personal information
- Born: January 28, 1962 (age 64); Caroleen, North Carolina, U.S.
- Listed height: 6 ft 1 in (1.85 m)
- Listed weight: 198 lb (90 kg)

Career information
- High school: Chase (Forest City, North Carolina)
- College: Clemson
- NFL draft: 1984: 3rd round, 63rd overall pick

Career history
- New England Patriots (1984–1990); Detroit Drive (1992–1993)

Awards and highlights
- ArenaBowl champion (1992); First-team All-Arena (1993); National champion (1981); First-team All-ACC (1983)

Career NFL statistics
- Interceptions: 6
- Sacks: 2
- Stats at Pro Football Reference

Career AFL statistics
- Tackles: 68
- Pass Break-ups: 23
- Interceptions: 9
- Stats at ArenaFan.com

Rodney McSwain (born January 28, 1962) is an American former professional football player who was a cornerback in the National Football League (NFL). He played college football for the Clemson Tigers and was selected by the Atlanta Falcons in the third round of the 1984 NFL draft. He played seven seasons for the New England Patriots from 1984 to 1990. He also played two seasons in the Arena Football League (AFL) with the Detroit Drive, winning ArenaBowl VI in 1992.
