= Colony High School (Alaska) =

Location
- 9550 E Bogard Rd; Palmer, Alaska 99645; United States; 61°36′32″N 149°12′46″W

Information
- School type: Public secondary school
- School district: Matanuska-Susitna Borough School District
- CEEB code: 020286
- Principal: Kristy Johnston
- Teaching staff: 51.20 (FTE)
- Grades: 9–12
- Enrollment: 1,046 (2024-2025)
- Student to teacher ratio: 20.43
- Hours in school day: 7:45 AM - 2:15 PM
- Colors: Green, black, and white
- Mascot: Knight
- Website: www.matsuk12.us/chs

Colony High School (CHS) is a public secondary school in Palmer, Alaska, serving students in grades 9–12 in the Palmer-Wasilla area. It is part of the Matanuska-Susitna Borough School District.

== Sports ==
Colony's sports include football, cross-country running, swimming, tennis, cross-country skiing, wrestling, hockey, basketball, track and field, soccer, baseball, volleyball, and softball.

Colony won the Class 4A state volleyball championship in 1998, and the Division 1 state football championship in 2022.

== Activities ==
Colony High School had the state's only marching band for 15 years until 2017, when Houston High School started a band. The following season, three other schools also started bands and four of the five participated in the 2018 Invitational hosted annually by Colony. The marching band was invited to march at the 2009 Inaugural Parade for Barack Obama. It participated in the 2014 Tournament of Roses Parade on January 1, 2014, in Pasadena, CA, and the 2017 Macy's Thanksgiving Day Parade.

The school produces its own newspaper, entitled The Knightly News.

== Notable people ==
- Clare Baldwin, journalist
- Jessica Moore (basketball), basketball player
- Cole Magner, indoor football wide receiver
