= Jason Hilliard =

American football player (born 1981)

No. 78, 69
- Position: Offensive tackle

Personal information
- Born: June 29, 1981 (age 45); Jeffersonville, Indiana, U.S.
- Listed height: 6 ft 6 in (1.98 m)
- Listed weight: 328 lb (149 kg)

Career information
- High school: Jeffersonville
- College: Louisville (2000–2003)
- NFL draft: 2004: undrafted

Career history
- Green Bay Packers (2004)*; New York Giants (2004–2005); St. Louis Rams (2006)*; Columbus Destroyers (2007); Dallas Cowboys (2007)*; Columbus Destroyers (2008)
- * Offseason or practice squad member only

Career NFL statistics
- Games played: 2
- Stats at Pro Football Reference
- Stats at ArenaFan.com

Jason Bradley Hilliard (born June 29, 1981) is an American former professional football offensive tackle who played for the New York Giants of the National Football League (NFL). He played college football for the Louisville Cardinals. Hilliard also had stints with the Green Bay Packers, St. Louis Rams, Dallas Cowboys and the Columbus Destroyers of the Arena Football League (AFL).

== Early life ==
Hilliard was born on June 29, 1981, in Jeffersonville, Indiana. He attended Jeffersonville High School in Jeffersonville.

== College career ==
Hilliard played college football for the Louisville Cardinals from 2000 to 2003 and was a four-year letterman. He played in 52 games, starting in three.

== Professional career ==
=== Green Bay Packers ===
After going undrafted in the 2004 NFL draft, Hilliard signed with the Green Bay Packers as an undrafted free agent. On August 30, 2004, he was waived by the team.

=== New York Giants ===
On November 17, 2004, Hilliard was signed to by the New York Giants to the practice squad. On December 20, he was elevated to the active roster. Hilliard played the final two games of the 2004 season at left tackle following an injury to Luke Petitgout. On August 29, 2005, he was released.

=== St. Louis Rams ===
On January 5, 2006, Hilliard signed with the St. Louis Rams. On August 8, he was waived by the team.

=== Columbus Destroyers (first stint) ===
In 2007, Hilliard played for the Columbus Destroyers of the Arena Football League (AFL). He had two receptions for 14 yards and three tackles.

=== Dallas Cowboys ===
On August 14, 2007, Hilliard was signed by the Dallas Cowboys. On August 27, he was released.

=== Columbus Destroyers (second stint) ===
In 2008, Hilliard returned to the Destroyers, recording one catch for seven yards and one tackle. On July 15, 2008, he was re-signed but the team (and the AFL) folded before the 2009 season began.

== Personal life ==
After his playing career ended, Hilliard became a police officer for the Louisville Metro Police Department.
