= Josh Bush (wide receiver) =

American football player (born 1980)

Joshua Bush (born July 23, 1980) is a former American football wide receiver in the Arena Football League who played for the Grand Rapids Rampage, Columbus Destroyers, Dallas Desperados, Orlando Predators, and New Orleans VooDoo. He played college football for the Western Michigan Broncos.
