= Hunkie Cooper =

American football player and coach (born 1969)

UNLV Rebels
- Title: Director of football player development

Personal information
- Born: May 17, 1969 (age 57); Palestine, Texas, U.S.
- Listed height: 5 ft 9 in (1.75 m)
- Listed weight: 190 lb (86 kg)

Career information
- Position: Wide receiver / Linebacker (No. 14)
- High school: Westwood (Palestine)
- College: UNLV
- NFL draft: 1991: undrafted

Career history

Playing
- BC Lions (1992)*; Arizona Rattlers (1993–2005); New Orleans Saints (1994)*
- * Offseason or practice squad member only

Coaching
- Utah Blaze (WR/LB) (2006); Utah Blaze (DC) (2007); Utah Blaze (DB) (2008); Canyon Springs HS (NV) (head coach) (2009–2014); San Diego State (WR) (2015–2022); UNLV (director of football player development) (2023–present)

Awards and highlights
- 2× ArenaBowl champion (1994, 1997); AFL MVP (1993); 4× First-team All-Arena (1993, 1995, 1996, 2000); 2× Second-team All-Arena (1997, 1999); 2× AFL Ironman of the Year (1999, 2000); 2× AFL All-Ironman Team (1999, 2000); AFL Second Team 15th Anniversary Team (2001); AFL 20 Greatest Players – #5 (2006); AFL 25 Greatest Players – #5 (2012); Arena Football Hall of Fame (2011); Arizona Rattlers #14 retired (2005)

Career AFL statistics
- Receptions-Yards-TDs: 775–8,575–139
- Rush-Yards-TDs: 145–287–39
- Tackles-Sacks-INTs: 196–3.0–15
- Returns-Yards-TDs: 476–9,459–26
- Passing yards-TDs: 75–8
- Stats at ArenaFan.com

Hernandez James "Hunkie" Cooper (born May 17, 1969) is an American former professional football player who was a wide receiver and linebacker for the Arizona Rattlers of the Arena Football League (AFL). He is currently the director of football player development for the UNLV Rebels football team. He is a two-time recipient of the AFL Ironman of the Year award and was voted league MVP in 1993.

== Early life ==
Hunkie Cooper was the son of a military veteran and the youngest, and shortest, of 9 children. He received the name Hernandez from a pact his father had made to his best friend prior to the Vietnam War. The pact they made said that if either were to die, the other would name his next child after him.

Cooper attended Westwood High School in Palestine, Texas, and was a student and a letterman in football, basketball, and baseball. In football, he played quarterback.

== College career ==
Hunkie went on to play at Navarro College in Texas where he led the Bulldogs to a NJCAA national championship in 1989. He soon transferred to University of Nevada, Las Vegas. At UNLV, he played six different positions, and he was a two-time All-Big West Conference selection. In a dramatic beginning to D1 Football in Hunkie's first game for Head Coach Jim Strong's UNLV Rebel's he scored four touchdowns from all over the field in the season opener verses Southwest Missouri. As a punt returner during his senior season he was selected as an All-American. He received a B.A. in Criminal Law and Education in 1991.

== Professional career ==
After his time at UNLV, Hunkie believed his football career was over, so he took a job at a Las Vegas area casino. In May 1992, he signed with the BC Lions of the Canadian Football League as a defensive back. He was released on June 23, 1992. One day at work at the casino, Arizona Rattlers Director of Player Personnel Pete Kettela asked him if he would like to sign a contract with the Rattlers organization.

=== 1993–1997 ===
Cooper arrived at Rattlers camp as a fourth string receiver but quickly worked his way up the depth chart. By the end of the year he was selected as the league MVP, and an all-star as an Offensive Specialist while breaking the AFL record for kickoff return yards with 1,423 yards.

Cooper signed with the New Orleans Saints of the National Football League in April 1994. He was released by the Saints on June 10, 1994. Cooper then returned to the Rattlers in 1994, Cooper helped take the team to their first ArenaBowl appearance, which they won, 36–31.

In 1996, a year after making the transition to a two-way receiver and linebacker, he was selected as an all star once again.

In 1997, Cooper was a second-team all star selection. He helped lead the team to their second ArenaBowl win and was voted as Ironman of the game after catching a 30-yard touchdown pass, returning a kick for a touchdown, and returning an interception for a touchdown.

=== 1998–2001 ===
He was voted Tinactin Ironman of the Year, Second-team All-Arena – WR/LB, and All-Ironman Team in 1999. He was again voted Tinactin Ironman of the Year, First-team All-Arena – WR/LB, and All-Ironman Team – WR/LB, in 2000.

In 2001, he was again selected to the All-Ironman Team – WR/LB and for the first time was a First-team member of the 15th Anniversary Team – WR/LB.

=== 2002–2005 ===
On March 20, 2002, Cooper re-signed with the Rattlers. He helped lead the team to three consecutive appearances in the ArenaBowl.

Cooper began the 2005 season on injured reserve, missing the first two games of the season with a quadriceps injury. He soon retired after being cut.

=== Retirement ===
After being cut by the Rattlers in 2005, he decided to retire. On May 6, 2005, the Arizona Rattlers retired his #14. Cooper was elected into the Arena Football Hall of Fame in the 2011 class.

Cooper is one of only two players to earn both AFL MVP (1993) and Ironman of the Year awards (1999, 2000) in a career. He is also one of two players to earn Ironman awards twice. He finished his career as Arizona's all-time leader in receiving yards (8,559), receptions (776), forced fumbles (7), fumble recoveries (11) and touchdowns (205). Cooper is also the Arena Football League's all-time leader in all-purpose yardage (20,587) and kickoff returns (500).

== Coaching career ==
=== Utah Blaze ===
In 2006, he later became a wide receivers/linebackers coach for the Utah Blaze under his former coach Danny White.

In 2007, Cooper was the defensive coordinator for the Blaze.

In 2008, Cooper was demoted to defensive backs coach under new Blaze head coach Ron James. After the Blaze started the season 0–5, Cooper was relieved of his coaching duties.

=== High school coaching ===
While coaching with the Utah Blaze, Hunkie also served as an assistant coach with Canyon Springs High School in Las Vegas. In 2009 Hunkie was named the head coach at Canyon Springs High School and was also named Coach of the Year. He also served as an assistant coach at Bishop Gorman High School in Las Vegas.

=== San Diego State ===
In January 2015, Cooper was hired as the wide receivers coach at San Diego State University. Cooper was dismissed from his position at San Diego State in January 2023.

=== UNLV ===
On March 1, 2023, UNLV announced the hiring of Cooper as its director of football player development.

== Personal life ==
Cooper resides in Las Vegas, Nevada.
