= 1993 Arena Football League season =

- League: Arena Football League
- Sport: Arena football
- Duration: May 14, 1993 – August 21, 1993

Regular season
- Season MVP: Hunkie Cooper, ARI

League postseason
- Semifinals champions: Detroit Drive
- Semifinals runners-up: Arizona Rattlers
- Semifinals champions: Tampa Bay Storm
- Semifinals runners-up: Orlando Predators

ArenaBowl VII
- Champions: Tampa Bay Storm
- Runners-up: Detroit Drive

AFL seasons
- ← 1992 1994 →

American, National

The 1993 Arena Football League season was the seventh season of the Arena Football League (AFL). The league champions were the Tampa Bay Storm, who defeated the Detroit Drive in ArenaBowl VII. The AFL also re-aligned to two conferences.

== Team movement ==
The New Orleans Night and the San Antonio Force both ceased operations and the Sacramento Attack relocated to Miami to become the Miami Hooters. The Denver Dynamite remained inactive.

== Standings ==
1993 Arena Football League standings
Team	Overall			Conference			Scoring				
Team	W	L	PCT	W	L	PCT	PF	PA	PF (Avg.)	PA (Avg.)	STK
American Conference
xyz-Detroit Drive	11	1	.917	8	0	1.000	506	372	42.1	31	W 4
x-Arizona Rattlers	7	5	.583	6	2	.750	486	489	40.5	40.75	L 1
x-Dallas Texans	3	9	.250	2	6	.250	454	551	37.83	45.92	L 5
Cleveland Thunderbolts	2	10	.167	2	6	.250	357	484	29.75	40.33	L 7
Cincinnati Rockers	2	10	.167	2	6	.250	394	525	32.83	43.75	W 1
National Conference
xy-Orlando Predators	10	2	.833	6	2	.750	526	355	43.83	29.58	L 1
x-Tampa Bay Storm	9	3	.750	5	3	.625	571	389	47.58	32.42	W 3
x-Charlotte Rage	6	6	.500	3	5	.375	440	509	36.66	42.42	L 2
x-Miami Hooters	5	7	.417	3	5	.375	258	491	21.5	40.92	W 2
x-Albany Firebirds	5	7	.417	3	5	.375	482	490	40.16	40.83	W 1

z – clinched homefield advantage

y – clinched division title

x – clinched playoff spot

== Playoffs ==
Quarterfinals
1	Detroit	51
8	Dallas	6
4	Arizona	56
5	Charlotte	49
2	Orlando	41
7	Miami	13
3	Tampa Bay	48
6	Albany	34

Semifinals
1	Detroit	38
4	Arizona	34
2	Orlando	52
3	Tampa Bay	55

ArenaBowl VII
1	Detroit	31
3	Tampa Bay	51

== Awards and honors ==
=== Regular season awards ===
Award	Winner	Position	Team
Most Valuable Player	Hunkie Cooper	Wide receiver/Linebacker	Arizona Rattlers
Ironman of the Year	Barry Wagner	Wide receiver/Defensive back	Orlando Predators
Coach of the Year	Danny White	Head coach	Arizona Rattlers
Executive of the Year	Bryan Colangelo	General Manager	Arizona Rattlers
Commissioner's Award	Bob Gries	Owner	Tampa Bay Storm

=== All-Arena team ===
Position	First team
Quarterback	Ben Bennett, Orlando
Fullback/Linebacker	Andre Bowden, Tampa Bay
Wide receiver/Defensive back	Barry Wagner, Orlando
Wide receiver/Linebacker	Niu Sale, Miami
Offensive specialist	Hunkie Cooper, Arizona
Offensive lineman/Defensive lineman	Dannie Lockett, Detroit; Willie Fears, Cleveland; Deatrich Wise, Tampa Bay
Defensive specialist	Durwood Roquemore, Orlando; Rodney McSwain, Detroit
Kicker	Mike Black, Charlotte
