= ArenaBowl XVII =

Annual league championship game

Arizona Rattlers (#6)	Tampa Bay Storm (#2)
29	43
	1	2	3	4	Total
ARI	10	6	6	7	29
TB	14	9	7	13	43
- Date: June 22, 2003
- Stadium: St. Pete Times Forum; Tampa, Florida
- MVP: Lawrence Samuels, WR/LB, Tampa Bay: Lawrence Samuels, WR/LB, Tampa Bay (Ironman of the Game)
- Attendance: 20,496
- Winning coach: Tim Marcum
- Losing coach: Danny White

TV in the United States
- Network: NBC
- Announcers: Tom Hammond, Pat Haden, Lewis Johnson and Marty Snider

ArenaBowl XVII was played on June 22, 2003 at the St. Pete Times Forum (formerly the Ice Palace) in Tampa, Florida before a sellout crowd of 20,496. The Tampa Bay Storm earned their AFL record fifth ArenaBowl title, by defeating the Arizona Rattlers, 43–29. The win was just months after the NFL's Tampa Bay Buccaneers won Super Bowl XXXVII, making Tampa Bay the first metropolitan area to simultaneously hold both NFL and AFL championships.

== Game summary ==
Hall of Fame coach Tim Marcum earned his seventh ArenaBowl title as his Tampa Bay Storm took a first quarter lead and never relinquished it, defeating fellow Hall of Fame coach Danny White's Arizona Rattlers by 14.

The teams traded scores in the first quarter, but early in the second Tampa Bay lineman Kelvin Kinney scooped up a Sherdrick Bonner fumble – one of four lost Rattler fumbles on the day – and ran 26 yards for a rather controversial touchdown. Though it appeared Kinney had thrown the ball in the air in celebration before crossing the goal line, the touchdown stood, and the Storm took a 20–10 lead. Though Arizona answered with a Bo Kelly touchdown run to close within 20–16, the Storm used two second-half touchdown passes from veteran backup quarterback Pat O'Hara to Lawrence Samuels to keep the Rattlers at bay. The 34-year-old O'Hara, who defeated the Storm in ArenaBowl XII as the quarterback for the Orlando Predators, had thrown only 14 passes all year but was pressed into action when starter John Kaleo was injured in the second quarter. He ran for another score with 10 minutes to play, putting Tampa Bay ahead 43–22 and sealing the victory.

Samuels was named both the game's MVP and Ironman of the Game, as he led all players with five catches for 109 yards and three touchdowns. The game was the first ArenaBowl to be televised by NBC, as ABC had televised the previous five. All participants wore "FP" stickers on their helmets in memory of Orlando Predators head coach Fran Papasedero, who was killed in a one-car accident just days before the game.

== Scoring summary ==
1st Quarter

- AZ – FG Garner 36
- TB – Samuels 33 pass from Kaleo (Stucker kick failed)
- AZ – Bonner 1 run (Garner kick)
- TB – Proctor 1 run (Saunders pass from Dell)

2nd Quarter

- TB – Kinney 26 fumble return (Stucker kick failed)
- AZ – Kelly 8 run (Garner kick failed)
- TB – FG Stucker 23

3rd Quarter

- TB – Samuels 9 pass from O'Hara (Stucker kick)
- AZ – Bryant 3 pass from Bonner (Garner kick failed)

4th Quarter

- TB – Samuels 43 pass from O'Hara (Stucker kick)
- TB – O'Hara 3 run (Stucker kick failed)
- AZ – Gatewood 3 pass from Bonner (Garner kick)
