= ArenaBowl VII =

Tampa Bay Storm (3rd)	Detroit Drive (1st)
51	31
	1	2	3	4	Total
TB	10	20	7	14	51
DET	0	17	7	7	31
- Date: August 21, 1993
- Stadium: Joe Louis Arena; Detroit, Michigan
- MVP: Jay Gruden, QB, Tampa Bay: Keith Browner, OL/DL, Tampa Bay (Ironman of the Game)
- Attendance: 12,989
- Winning coach: Lary Kuharich
- Losing coach: Tim Marcum

TV in the United States
- Network: ESPN
- Announcers: Tom Mees, Rick 'Doc' Walker

ArenaBowl '93 (or ArenaBowl VII) was the Arena Football League's seventh ArenaBowl. The game featured the number 3 Tampa Bay Storm (9–3) of the National Conference against the number 1 Detroit Drive (11–1) of the American Conference. The Storm defeated the Drive by the score of 51–31, winning their second ArenaBowl in team history, and their second one in three years.

== Game summary ==
In the first quarter, the Storm struck first with kicker Arden Czyzewski getting a 24-yard field goal, while quarterback Jay Gruden completed a 15-yard touchdown pass to WR-LB Stevie Thomas.

In the second quarter, Detroit got on the board with kicker John Langeloh getting a 21-yard field goal, yet the Storm answered with Czyzewski nailing a 47-yard field goal and OL-DL Keith Browner recovering a Drive fumble in their end zone for a touchdown. Detroit answered with QB Gilbert Renfoe completing a 27-yard touchdown pass to OS George LaFrance, yet Tampa Bay replied with Gruden completing an 18-yard touchdown pass to WR-DB Amod Field. The Drive got another touchdown as Renfoe completed a two-yard pass to OL-DL James Goode, while the Storm wrapped up the half with Czyzewski kicking a 26-yard field goal.

In the third quarter, with Tampa Bay in command, back-up QB Bobby Byrd got a touchdown pass in as he completed a nine-yard strike to Browner, while Detroit answered with Renfoe completing a 34-yard touchdown pass to WR/DB Grantis Bell.

In the fourth quarter, the Storm continued on its lead with Gruden completing a seven-yard touchdown pass to WR/LB "Downtown" Eddie Brown. All that was left of the Drive's comeback hopes was FB/LB Tony Burse getting a one-yard touchdown run. Tampa Bay wrapped up the game with FB/LB Les Barley getting a four-yard touchdown run.

With the win, the Storm got its second ArenaBowl title in three seasons.

== Scoring summary ==
1st quarter

- TB - FG Czyzewski 24
- TB - Thomas 15 pass from Gruden (Czyzewski kick)

2nd quarter

- DET - FG Langelog 21
- TB - FB Czyzewski 47
- TB - Browner 0 fumble recovery (Czyzewski kick)
- DET - LaFrance 27 pass from Renfoe (Langelog kick)
- TB - Field 18 pass from Gruden (Czyzewski kick)
- DET - Goode 2 pass from Renfoe (Langelog kick)
- TB - FG Czyzewski 26

3rd quarter

- TB - Browner 9 pass from Byrd (Czyzewski kick)
- DET - Bell 34 pass from Renfroe (Langeloh kick)

4th quarter

- TB - Brown 7 pass from Gruden (Czyzewski kick)
- DET - Burse 1 run (Langeloh kick)
- TB - Barley 4 run (Czyzewski kick)
