= Tampa Bay Storm =

Arena football team

Logo

General information
- Founded: 1987
- Folded: 2017
- Headquartered: Amalie Arena in Tampa, Florida
- Colors: Blue, gold, white
- Mascot: Storm Dawg
- TampaBayStorm.com

Personnel
- Owner: Tampa Bay Sports and Entertainment
- CEO: Jeffrey Vinik
- Head coach: Ron James
- President: Derrick Brooks

Team history
- Pittsburgh Gladiators (1987–1990); Tampa Bay Storm (1991–2017)

Home fields
- Civic Arena (1987–1990); ThunderDome (1991–1996); Amalie Arena (1997–2017)

League / conference affiliations
- Arena Football League (1987–2017): National Conference (1993–2008); American Conference (2010–2016); South (1991, 1995–2008, 2010–2015)

Championships
- League championships: 5; 1991, 1993, 1995, 1996, 2003
- Conference championships: 1; 2010; Prior to 2005, the AFL did not have conference championship games
- Division championships: 5: Southern: 1995, 1996, 1998, 1999, 2003

Playoff appearances (24)
- 1987, 1988, 1989, 1990, 1991, 1992, 1993, 1994, 1995, 1996, 1997, 1998, 1999, 2000, 2001, 2002, 2003, 2004, 2005, 2007, 2010, 2013, 2016, 2017

The Tampa Bay Storm were a professional arena football team based in Tampa, Florida, US. It played in the Arena Football League (AFL). Originally the team was located in Pittsburgh, Pennsylvania, and operated as the Pittsburgh Gladiators. The franchise was one of the original four that launched the Arena Football League for its inaugural season in 1987. The club was relocated to the Tampa Bay area for the 1991 season, being the last of the original teams to either fold or leave its market. After 26 years in the Tampa market, the team ceased operations in December 2017.

The team actually played outside Tampa in nearby St. Petersburg from 1991 to 1996, then in Tampa until 2008, after which point the AFL suspended operations and did not return until the 2010 season following the league's restructuring. It had been in the same city for longer than any other AFL team. During its tenure the franchise won five ArenaBowl championships. With 241 wins, the Storm had won far more games than any other team in AFL history. After the team dissolved in 2017, indoor football in the Tampa Bay area was succeeded by the Tampa Bay Tornadoes who began to play in 2021 in the American Arena League.

The club was last owned by Jeffrey Vinik, also the owner of the NHL's Tampa Bay Lightning. Home games were played at Amalie Arena in Tampa.

== History ==
The Storm holds the Arena Football League record for the longest tenure by a franchise in a single market area. It was also the last of the original four franchises (the Chicago Bruisers, Denver Dynamite and Washington Commandos were the other three) to have operated in continuous existence from the formation of the league in 1987 until the present decade before ceasing operations.

=== Pittsburgh Gladiators (1987–1990) ===
When arena football was first announced in 1986, Jim Foster targeted Pittsburgh, Pennsylvania for an inaugural franchise due to the great football tradition of the area. The franchise was originally known as the Pittsburgh Gladiators, and was one of the original four AFL teams formed in 1987. The team was named by Robert Ninehouser whose entry for the team name was selected in 1987. They originally played their home games at the Pittsburgh Civic Arena in Pittsburgh. On June 19, 1987, the Gladiators defeated the Washington Commandos 48–46 in the first ever AFL regular season game. The Gladiators participated in ArenaBowls I and III, losing both.

=== Moving to St. Petersburg (1991–1994) ===
The team moved to St. Petersburg, Florida in 1991, with the team taking on the "Storm" moniker. A Cleveland Arena Football League franchise later bore the Gladiators name; however, other than the coincidental names the two organizations shared no link in histories.

The Storm won the ArenaBowl in its first season in Tampa Bay (V) and has won four subsequent championships (VII, IX, X, and XVII). Up to the 2006 season, the Storm had qualified for the playoffs in every season but one during their time in Tampa Bay.

T.B. Storm Logo (1991–1996)

The team played in the former ThunderDome in St. Petersburg (now called Tropicana Field) from 1991–1996, becoming its first regular team sports tenant. Since 1997, the team played its home games in the Amalie Arena in Tampa and previously known as the Ice Palace, St. Pete Times Forum, and Tampa Bay Times Forum.

=== Tim Marcum era (1995–2010) ===
After the 1994 season, Greis sold the team to Peter "Woody" Kern for $850,000. Kern's first move as the Storm owner was the hiring of coach Tim Marcum, who is widely regarded as the greatest coach in arena football history.

On March 14, 2002, Kern had the opportunity to sell the Storm, receiving an offer from Michigan mortgage broker Thom Hopper for what was then a record price of $12 million. Hopper submitted two payments totaling $1.6 million before Kern regained possession of the team. Later in 2006, Hopper pleaded guilty to federal wire fraud charges that authorities say resulted from his attempt to buy the Storm. He was sentenced in January to nearly three years in prison and ordered to pay at least $1.8 million in restitution to a title insurance company, according to media reports.

On December 23, 2004, Sports Illustrated reported that the AFL's players' union filed a grievance against the Storm. The reason was that seven of the Storm's players claimed that some of the diamonds in their 2003 AFL championship rings were fake. Six of the seven players had left the team after the 2003 season. The Storm acknowledged that some of the rings did, in fact, include cubic zirconia instead of diamonds, and that different players received greater amounts of diamonds in their rings based on their contributions that season.

The Storm ended the 2006 season with a 7–9 record (4th in their division), ending a 19-year streak of playoff appearances, dating back to their days as the Gladiators and the start of the Arena Football League.

In December 2007, Kern sold 51% of his stake in the Storm to Robert Nucci for just over $9.6 million, while still maintaining control of the other 49%. The Storm followed a 9–7 season and first-round playoff exit in 2007 with an 8–8 finish in 2008. The team salvaged the .500 record by defeating the Los Angeles Avengers 72–47 in Tampa. There was no 2009 Arena Football League season due to the league's ongoing financial difficulties, which resulted in its filing for Chapter 7 bankruptcy, later converted to Chapter 11, leaving it uncertain if the Storm, arguably the most successful team in the history of any form of indoor football, would ever play another game.

=== New AFL (2010–2017) ===
T.B. Storm Logo (1997–2011)

A new arena football league, originally called Arena Football 1, formed in 2009. The Storm was not one of the initial 16 teams announced. However, Bossier-Shreveport Battle Wings owner Dan Newman mentioned that the Storm were one of at least two former AFL franchises that were being negotiated with, the other being the San Jose SaberCats. The new organization bought the rights to the intellectual property, including the team names, logos, histories, and patented rules of the old AFL in a bankruptcy auction, which allowed it to function essentially as a full successor; after this action, the name Arena Football 1 was dropped and the group resumed operating as the Arena Football League. The Storm resumed full operations for the new league's 2010 season, with some players from the former roster, and once again coached by Tim Marcum and this time owned by Tampa Bay Storm Partners LLC, a group led by Todd Boren, a previous partner with the Orlando Predators and the Arizona Rattlers. The AFL released the schedule for the season on December 31, 2009. The Storm returned during the opening weekend of the season on April 3, 2010. On February 17, 2010, it was formally announced that the AF1 had adopted the former Arena Football League name.

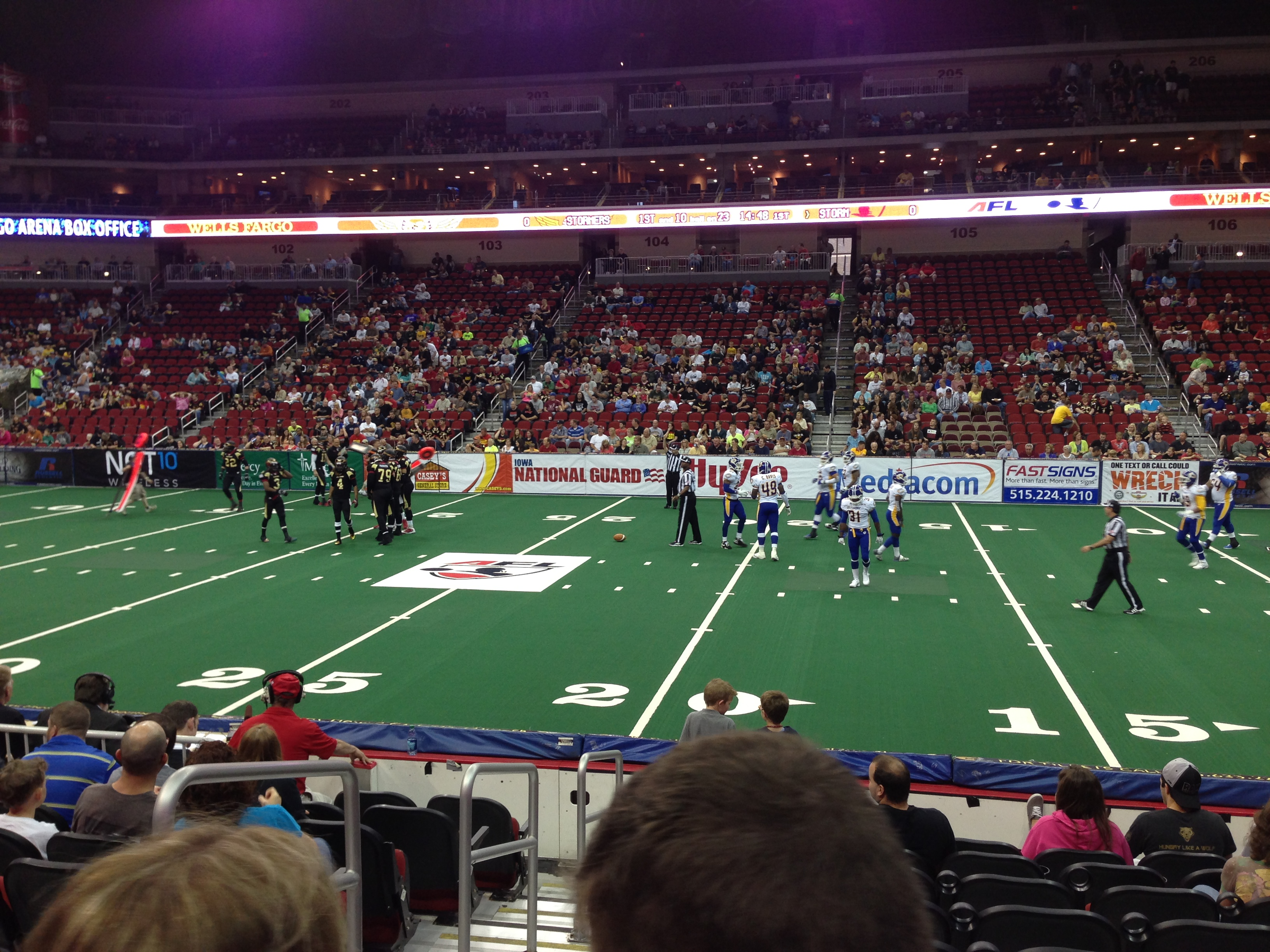
The Storm playing against the Iowa Barnstormers during the 2013 season.

In the 2010 season the Storm went 11–5, finishing second in the South Division. In the playoffs, they earned a trip to ArenaBowl XXIII, but lost to the Spokane Shock 57–69.

On February 17, 2011, Marcum would resign as head coach of the Storm less than a month before the 2011 season was to begin, after having the position for 15 years. He left as the AFL's all-time winningest head coach with 211 wins. Dave Ewart was named as the team's new head coach the next day. His resignation was sparked by an admission in a deposition related to a lawsuit he had filed against the Storm's previous owner, Robert Nucci. In that deposition, Marcum admitted to forwarding emails that were pornographic and racially tinged to other members of the Storm organization, using his work email address. In April 2011, former Tampa Bay Buccaneers linebacker Derrick Brooks became a part owner and the team president for the Storm. After a 7–4 start to the 2013 season, the Storm lost the final seven games of the season, but still qualified for the postseason. The Storm played well in their playoff game, but came up just short against the Jacksonville Sharks. The team's collapse lead to the firing of Ewart. One month later, the team announced they had promoted offensive coordinator, and Storm legend Lawrence Samuels to the team's head coach. Samuels and the Storm mutually agreed to part ways in August 2016. On October 25, 2016, Ron James was named the head coach. In 2017, the Storm finished the regular season with a 10–4 record and later advanced to ArenaBowl XXX, where they lost to the Philadelphia Soul by a score of 44–40.

In December 2017, the Storm announced it was ceasing operations due to increasing operating costs combined with decreasing team revenue. Ownership did not rule out future participation in a "stronger, reinvented AFL." The Storm was the last of the original four AFL teams to cease operations.

== Storm highlights ==
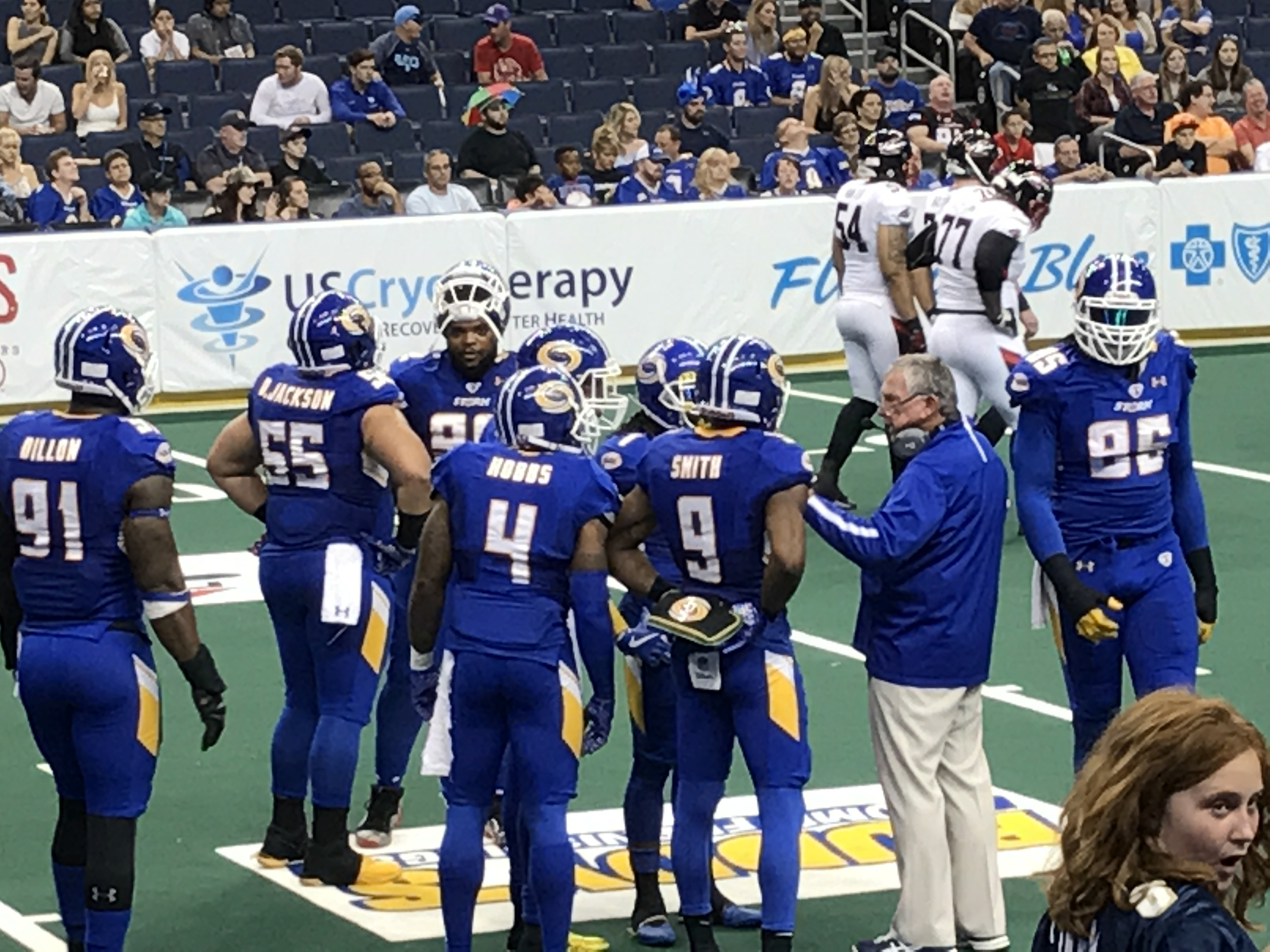
The Storm in 2017

- In a 1996 playoff game against the Arizona Rattlers the Storm had the lead late in the game, but the Rattlers came down the field and scored a touchdown with little time left on the clock. Rather than try to tie the game with an extra point, Rattlers coach Danny White elected to go for the win with the two-point conversion. Quarterback Sherdrick Bonner was stopped short and the Storm won the game. On the AFL's 20 Greatest Highlights this is ranked at number 10.
- During a 1991 regular season game, the Storm found themselves down 17 points against the Albany Firebirds. However, they rallied late in the game to take a 57–53 lead. But it wasn't over yet as the Firebirds had five seconds left to come up with the touchdown from midfield. The Storm won the game with an interception off the nets. On the AFL's 20 Greatest Highlights Countdown, this is ranked #8.
- ArenaBowl V found the Detroit Drive hosting the Tampa Bay Storm. With seconds left in the game, quarterback Jay Gruden threw deep to Stevie Thomas in the endzone. It was complete, and the Storm won the ArenaBowl. On the AFL's 20 Greatest Highlights Countdown, this is ranked number 5.
- Stevie Thomas saves the Storm: During a 1995 semifinal game between Albany and Tampa Bay, Albany took a late one-point lead with seconds left on the clock. On the ensuing kickoff the Storm couldn't field the ball off the nets and Stevie Thomas found himself in the very back of the endzone. Thomas broke five tackles at once coming out of the endzone and went all the way for a touchdown to give the Storm the win 56–49. They later went on to capture their 3rd ArenaBowl in 5 years. On the AFL's 20 Greatest Highlights Countdown, this is at #2.
- On March 16, 2012, the Storm became the first AFL team to win 200 games in league history with a 50–47 victory over the Georgia Force.
- The Storm had a heated rivalry with the Orlando Predators known as the War on I-4. Both teams found success and faced each other in the ArenaBowl and playoffs numerous times.

== Players ==
=== Retired numbers ===
Tampa Bay Storm retired numbers
N°	Player	Position	Seasons	Ref.
7	Jay Gruden	QB	1991–1996	
20	Stevie Thomas	WR/LB	1991–1999	
22	Lawrence Samuels	WR/LB	1995–2000, 2002–2010	
24	Tracey Perkins	DS	1991–1999	
25	George LaFrance	OS	1994–1999	
76	Al Lucas	DL	2003	
78	Sylvester Bembery	OL/DL	1994–1999, 2001	

=== Arena Football Hall of Famers ===
Tampa Bay Storm Hall of Famers
No.	Name	Year Inducted	Position(s)	Years w/ Storm
78	Sylvester Bembery	2011	OL/DL	1994–1999; 2001
30	Andre Bowden	2014	FB/LB	1991–1993; 1997–2001; 2003–2004
7	Jay Gruden	1999	QB	1991–1996
25	George LaFrance	2011	OS	1994–1999
--	Joe March	2000	OL/DL	1993–1996
--	Tim Marcum	1998	Head coach	1995–2010
22	Lawrence Samuels	2013	WR/LB	1994–2000; 2002–2010
	Omarr Smith	2014	WR/DB	2003
20	Stevie Thomas	2011	WR/DB	1991–1999
54	Craig Walls	1998	OL/DL	1987–1988

=== Individual awards ===
AFL MVP
Season	Player	Position
1987	Russell Hairston	WR/DB
1992	Jay Gruden	QB
2017	Randy Hippeard	QB

AFL Defensive Player of the Year
Season	Player	Position
1997	Tracey Perkins	DS
1998	Johnnie Harris	DS

Ironman of the Year
Season	Player	Position
1990	Thomas Monroe	WR/DB

AFL Rookie of the Year
Season	Player	Position
1999	Charles Wilson	OS
2007	Brett Dietz	QB

ArenaBowl MVP Winners
ArenaBowl	Player	Position
V	Stevie Thomas	WR/LB
VII	Jay Gruden	QB
IX	George LaFrance	OS
X	Stevie Thomas	WR/LB
XVII	Lawrence Samuels	WR/LB

Lineman of the Year
Season	Player	Position
1996	Kent Wells	OL/DL

Defensive Lineman of the Year
Season	Player	Position
2011	Cliff Dukes	DL

AFL Playmaker of the Year
Season	Player	Position
2017	Kendrick Ings	WR

AFL Offensive Player of the Year
Season	Player	Position
2017	Randy Hippeard	QB

Wide Receiver of the Year
Season	Player	Position
2017	Joe Hills	WR

=== All-Arena players ===
The following Gladiators/Storm players were named to All-Arena Teams:

- QB Willie Totten (1), Jay Gruden (2), Peter Tom Willis (1), Brett Dietz (1)
- FB/LB Lynn Bradford (1), Andre Bowden (3), Cedric McKinnon (1), Les Barley (1)
- WR Joe Hills (1), T. T. Toliver (1)
- WR/DB Russell Hairston (1), Mike Stoops (1), Alvin Williams (1), Thomas Monroe (1), Julius Dawkins (1), Melvin Cunningham (1)
- WR/LB Stevie Thomas (1), Lawrence Samuels (4)
- OL Tom Kaleita (1), George Bussey (1)
- DL Tim McGill (3), Jermaine Smith (1)
- OL/DL Craig Walls (2), Keith Browner (1), Tom Gizzi (1), Deatrich Wise (1), Kent Wells (2), Willie Wyatt (4), Sylvester Bembery (2), Rod Williams (1), B. J. Cohen (1), Nyle Wiren (1)
- LB Lawrence Samuels (1), Cliff Dukes (2)
- DB James Harrell (1)
- K Matt Black (1)
- DS Corey Dowden (1), Tracey Perkins (2), Johnnie Harris (1), Tommy Henry (1), Omarr Smith (1)
- OS/KR Stevie Thomas (1), James Bowden (1)

=== All-Ironman players ===
The following Gladiators/Storm players were named to All-Ironman Teams:

- FB/LB Les Barley (1), Andre Bowden (1), Torrance Marshall (1)
- WR/DB T. T. Toliver (1)
- WR/LB Lawrence Samuels (4)
- OL/DL B. J. Cohen (1)

=== All-Rookie players ===
The following Gladiators/Storm players were named to All-Rookie Teams:

- QB Brett Dietz
- OL/DL Al Lucas
- OS Charles Wilson
- DS Tommy Henry
- K Matt Huerkamp

== Head coaches ==
Name	Term	Regular season			Playoffs		Awards
Name	Term	W	L	Win%	W	L	Awards
Joe Haering	1987–1990	15	13	.536	0	3	
Darrel Jackson	1989	1	1	.500	1	1	
Fran Curci	1991	8	2	.800	2	0	AFL Coach of the Year (1991), ArenaBowl winning coach (V).
Lary Kuharich	1992–1994	25	9	.735	4	2	ArenaBowl winning coach (VII)
Tim Marcum	1995–2010	140	77	.645	16	10	2× AFL Coach of the Year (1987, 1998), 3× ArenaBowl winning coach (IX, X, XVII), AFL Hall of Fame (1998), Founder's Award winner (2001)
Dave Ewart	2005–2006, 2011–2013	25	34	.424	0	2	
Lawrence Samuels	2014–2016	17	35	.327	0	1	
Ron James	2017	10	4	.714	1	1	AFL Coach of the Year (2017)

== Cheerleaders ==
The Storm created an official cheerleading squad called the "Storm Cheerleaders."

== Radio and television ==
The Tampa Bay Storm games were broadcast on Storm Radio, which was on 1250-AM WHNZ. The final radio play-by-play announcer was Darek Sharp, who was also a producer and broadcaster for AM 620 WDAE, and the radio color commentator was Ian Beckles.

== Season-by-season ==
- Note: The Finish, Wins, and Losses columns list regular season results and exclude any postseason play. This list documents the season–by–season records of the Storm's franchise from 1987 to present, including postseason records, and league awards for individual players or head coaches.

ArenaBowl champions	ArenaBowl appearance	Division champions	Playoff berth

Season	League	Conference	Division	Regular season			Postseason results	Awards
Season	League	Conference	Division	Finish	Wins	Losses	Postseason results	Awards
Pittsburgh Gladiators
1987	AFL	–	–	1st	4	2	Lost ArenaBowl I (Denver) 16–45	Russell Hairston (Most Valuable Player)
1988	AFL	–	–	3rd*	6	6	Lost Semifinals (Detroit) 25–34	
1989	AFL	–	–	2nd*	3	1	Won Semifinals (Denver) 39–37; Lost ArenaBowl III (Detroit) 26–39	
1990	AFL	–	–	4th	3	5	Lost Semifinals (Detroit) 30–61	Thomas Monroe (Ironman of the Year)
Tampa Bay Storm
1991	AFL	–	–	3rd	8	2	Won Semifinals (Denver) 40–13; Won ArenaBowl V (Detroit) 48–42	Fran Curci (Coach of the Year)
1992	AFL	–	Southern	2nd	9	1	Won Quarterfinals (Cincinnati) 41–36; Lost Semifinals (Orlando) 21–24	Jay Gruden (Most Valuable Player)
1993	AFL	National	–	2nd	9	3	Won Quarterfinals (Albany) 48–34; Won Semifinals (Orlando) 55–52; Won ArenaBowl VII (Detroit) 51–31	Bob Gries (Commissioner's Award)
1994	AFL	National	–	2nd	7	5	Lost Quarterfinals (Massachusetts) 51–58	
1995	AFL	National	Southern	1st	10	2	Won Quarterfinals (Memphis) 53–41; Won Semifinals (Albany) 56–49; Won ArenaBowl IX (Orlando) 48–35	
1996	AFL	National	Southern	1st	12	2	Won Quarterfinals (Anaheim) 30–16; Won Semifinals (Arizona) 55–54; Won ArenaBowl X (Iowa) 42–38	Kent Wells (Lineman of the Year)
1997	AFL	National	Southern	2nd	8	6	Won Quarterfinals (Nashville) 52–49; Lost Semifinals (Arizona) 46–49	Tracey Perkins (Defensive Player of the Year)
1998	AFL	National	Southern	1st	12	2	Won Quarterfinals (San Jose) 65–46; Won Semifinals (New Jersey) 49–23; Lost ArenaBowl XII (Orlando) 31–62	Johnnie Harris (Defensive Player of the Year); Tim Marcum (Coach of the Year)
1999	AFL	National	Southern	1st	11	3	Lost Quarterfinals (Orlando) 19–41	Charles Wilson (Rookie of the Year)
2000	AFL	National	Southern	3rd	8	6	Won Wild Card Round (Milwaukee) 72–64; Lost Quarterfinals (Orlando) 24–34	
2001	AFL	National	Southern	2nd	10	4	Lost Quarterfinals (Indiana) 31–68	Tim Marcum (Founder's Award)
2002	AFL	National	Southern	3rd	6	8	Won Wild Card Round (Los Angeles) 66–41; Lost Quarterfinals (San Jose) 48–55	
2003	AFL	National	Southern	1st	12	4	Won Quarterfinals (Detroit) 52–48; Won Semifinals (Orlando) 60–50; Won ArenaBowl XVII (Arizona) 43–29	
2004	AFL	National	Southern	3rd	9	7	Lost Conference Semifinals (San Jose) 52–56	
2005	AFL	National	Southern	3rd	10	6	Lost Conference Semifinals (Georgia) 46–62	
2006	AFL	National	Southern	3rd	7	9		
2007	AFL	National	Southern	3rd	9	7	Lost Wild Card (Columbus) 55–56	Brett Dietz (Rookie of the Year)
2008	AFL	National	Southern	3rd	8	8		
2009	The league suspended operations for the 2009 AFL season.							
2010	AFL	American	South	2nd	11	5	Won Conference Semifinals (Tulsa) 68–38; Won Conference Championship (Orlando) 63–62; Lost ArenaBowl XXIII (Spokane) 57–69	
2011	AFL	American	South	4th	7	11		
2012	AFL	American	South	4th	8	10		
2013	AFL	American	South	3rd	7	11	Lost Conference Semifinals (Jacksonville) 62–69	
2014	AFL	American	South	2nd	8	10		
2015	AFL	American	South	3rd	7	11		
2016	AFL	American	—	4th	2	14	Lost Conference Semifinals (Philadelphia) 41–63	
2017	AFL	—	—	2nd	10	4	Won Semifinal (Cleveland) 73–59; Lost ArenaBowl XXX (Philadelphia) 40–44	Randy Hippeard (Most Valuable Player)
Total					241	175	(includes only regular season)	
Total					24	19	(includes only the postseason)	
Total					265	194	(includes both regular season and postseason)	
