= Todd Hammel =

American football player (born 1966)

No. 5, 8, 11, 15
- Position: Quarterback

Personal information
- Born: December 7, 1966 (age 59); Durant, Oklahoma, U.S.
- Listed height: 6 ft 1 in (1.85 m)
- Listed weight: 220 lb (100 kg)

Career information
- High school: Durant
- College: Stephen F. Austin
- NFL draft: 1990: 12th round, 307th overall pick

Career history
- Tampa Bay Buccaneers (1990)*; Atlanta Falcons (1990)*; New York/New Jersey Knights (1991); Dallas Texans (1992–1993); Fort Worth Cavalry (1994); Milwaukee Mustangs (1995–1999); Florida Bobcats (2000); Houston Thunderbears (2001); Grand Rapids Rampage (2002); Las Vegas Gladiators (2003); Philadelphia Soul (2004); Chicago Rush (2005); Colorado Crush (2006); Milwaukee Iron (2009); Chicago Rush (2010); Jacksonville Sharks (2010); Utah Blaze (2011)
- * Offseason or practice squad member only

Awards and highlights
- AFL All Star (1993)

Career AFL statistics
- Comp. / Att.: 2,255 / 3,964
- Passing yards: 28,022
- TD–INT: 442–150
- Passer rating: 91.05
- Rushing TD: 64
- Stats at ArenaFan.com

Todd Layne Hammel (born December 7, 1966) is an American former professional football player who was a quarterback for 11 teams in the Arena Football League (AFL) from 1992 to 2011. He played college football for the Stephen F. Austin Lumberjacks.

== Early life ==
Hammel attended Durant High School in Durant, Oklahoma, and was a four sport letterman in football, basketball, baseball, and track. As a junior, he helped lead his football team to the 1983–84 Class 3–A State Championship. He also helped lead the Lions in basketball to a District Championship. Hammel graduated from Durant High School in 1985.

== College career ==
Hammel played college football for the Stephen F. Austin Lumberjacks. As a senior, he helped lead his team to a 9–1–1 regular season record, the No. 3 ranking in final Division I-AA poll, and a berth in the 1989 NCAA Division I-AA Football Championship Game. Hammel was named a first team All-Conference pick and the Southland Conference Offensive Player of the Year. He finished his college career with 8,631 passing yards and 65 touchdowns. He left Stephen F. Austin as the school's all-time leader in passing attempts, completions, yards, touchdowns, and total yardage.

== Professional career ==
The Tampa Bay Buccaneers selected Hammel in the 12th round (307th overall) of the 1990 NFL draft.

On December 5, 1990, Hammel was signed to the Atlanta Falcons practice squad, but was released on December 12.

In 1991, he played for the New York/New Jersey Knights in the World League of American Football (WLAF). Hammel started the first game in Knights franchise history against the Barcelona Dragons, but was replaced in the first half by Jeff Graham.

In 1992, Hammel played for the Dallas Texans of the Arena Football League (AFL). In his first season with the Texans, Hammel threw for 28 touchdowns on 157 of 308 attempts for 1,799 yards. Hammel led the Texans to a playoff victory over the Albany Firebirds where he threw four touchdown passes. In 1993, Hammel returned and threw for 39 touchdowns and 2,287 yards.

In 1994, Hammel signed with the expansion franchise Fort Worth Cavalry of the (AFL). General Manager and head coach Michael Trigg was Hammel's offensive coordinator the two years he spent in Dallas. Hammel split playing time with fellow quarterback Kyle Mackey. On the season, Hammel tossed 28 touchdowns while passing for 1,745 yards.

In 1995, Hammel signed with the Milwaukee Mustangs of the (AFL). Hammel followed Trigg's to Milwaukee where he played for the Mustangs for five seasons. In 1998, he threw for a career high 60 touchdowns and 3,100 yards. In 1999, he became the first player in Arena Football League history to pass for 18,000 yards, 300 touchdowns and 1,500 completions.

In 2000, Hammel signed with the Florida Bobcats of the (AFL). He appeared in three games for the Bobcats.

In 2001, Hammel signed with the Houston Thunderbears of the (AFL), who were a traveling team for the season.

In 2002, Hammel signed with the Grand Rapids Rampage midway through the season where he appeared in two games. In week 12 against the Chicago Rush, he relieved starting quarterback Clint Dolezel and led the Rampage to 20 straight points in a near come from behind victory.

In 2003, Hammel signed with the Las Vegas Gladiators of the (AFL).

In 2004, Hammel signed with the Philadelphia Soul of the (AFL).

In 2005, Hammel signed with the Chicago Rush of the (AFL). In his first start of the season against the Nashville Cats he threw for 223 yards and five touchdowns in a 45–38 victory, filling in for injured starting quarterback Raymond Philyaw. The following week, he won his next start throwing six touchdowns on 21 of 25 completions against the Grand Rapids Rampage.

In 2006, Hammel signed with the Colorado Crush of the (AFL).

On May 28, 2009, Hammel signed with the Milwaukee Iron of the AF2. At 42 years of age, Hammel returned to professional football after not playing the previous two seasons. He was the oldest player in the league. In the season finale, Hammel completed 24 of 35 passes for 317 yards and seven touchdowns against the Albany Firebirds.

In July 2010, Hammel signed with the Jacksonville Sharks of the (AFL). Following an injury to Sharks' starting quarterback Aaron Garcia, Hammell was signed to backup Bernard Morris. He never appeared in a game for the Sharks.

On August 7, 2010, Hammel signed with the Chicago Rush of the (AFL). Hammel was signed as a backup quarterback for the playoffs. The Rush had been without a backup since starting quarterback Russ Michna went down with an injury. For the playoffs, he did not appear in a game while backing up J. J. Raterink.

On July 7, 2011, Hammel signed with the Utah Blaze of the (AFL). The Blaze would be Hammel's 13th and final indoor football team. Hammel started and played the final three games of the season. In game 17 against the New Orleans Voodoo, Hammel found wide receiver Chris Bocage on a game winning touchdown pass in the final seconds. In the season finale against the Cleveland Gladiators, he threw seven touchdowns while completing 31-of-44 passes for 355 yards in a 76–69 victory.

== Career statistics ==
=== AFL ===
Year	Team	Passing							Rushing		
Year	Team	Cmp	Att	Pct	Yds	TD	Int	Rtg	Att	Yds	TD
1992	Dallas	157	308	51.0	1,799	28	12	75.39	31	61	2
1993	Dallas	194	402	48.3	2,287	39	17	72.64	32	95	7
1994	Fort Worth	141	253	55.7	1,745	28	11	86.82	17	16	5
1995	Milwaukee	191	339	56.3	2,306	31	10	87.95	28	32	7
1996	Milwaukee	246	393	62.6	3,116	41	13	99.58	27	47	12
1997	Milwaukee	238	415	57.3	3,134	44	17	90.78	24	1	9
1998	Milwaukee	280	455	61.5	3,100	60	17	99.15	17	19	3
1999	Milwaukee	253	471	53.7	3,390	48	13	90.81	36	46	8
2000	Florida	10	21	47.6	181	2	1	81.65	1	-1	0
2001	Houston	168	301	55.8	2,221	34	14	88.20	10	28	7
2002	Grand Rapids	11	20	55.0	138	2	1	80.83	1	2	2
2003	Las Vegas	80	137	58.4	969	17	5	96.03	3	0	1
2004	Philadelphia	143	247	57.9	1,878	36	12	98.20	3	4	0
2005	Chicago	55	76	72.4	754	15	3	126.86	3	2	1
2006	Colorado	8	9	88.9	75	0	0	101.39	1	-1	0
2010	Jacksonville	DNP									
2010	Chicago	DNP									
2011	Utah	80	117	68.4	929	17	4	114.23	1	1	0
Career		2,255	3,964	56.9	28,022	422	150	91.05	235	352	64

=== af2 ===
Year	Team	Games			Passing								Rushing			
Year	Team	GP	GS	Record	Cmp	Att	Pct	Yds	Avg	TD	Int	Rtg	Att	Yds	Avg	TD
2009	Milwaukee	8	8	3–5	175	282	62.1	2,168	7.7	39	10	105.6	6	9	1.5	0
Career		8	8	3–5	175	282	62.1	2,168	7.7	39	10	105.6	6	9	1.5	0

Stats from TheStatGuys:

=== WLAF ===
Year	Team	Games			Passing								Rushing			
Year	Team	GP	GS	Record	Cmp	Att	Pct	Yds	Avg	TD	Int	Rtg	Att	Yds	Avg	TD
1991	NY/NJ	9	1	0–1	25	55	45.5	321	5.8	2	3	53.7	13	58	4.4	1
Career		9	1	0–1	25	55	45.5	321	5.8	2	3	53.7	13	58	4.4	1

=== College ===
Year	Team	Passing							
Year	Team	Comp	Att	Pct	Yards	Avg	TD	Int	Rate
1987	Stephen F. Austin	74	151	49.0	864	5.7	3	13	86.4
1988	Stephen F. Austin	154	329	46.8	2,403	7.3	14	15	113.1
1989	Stephen F. Austin	316	577	54.7	5,364	9.3	48	23	152.3
Career		544	1,060	51.3	8,631	8.1	65	51	130.3

== Personal life ==
Hammel is the great-grandson of Oklahoma Indian Chief Quana Parker and a member of the Comanche tribe. He is a distant relative of QB Sam Bradford.

Hammel has a twin brother, Tad. Todd is married to Tanna Bryant and they currently reside in McKinney, Texas.
