= 1995 Tampa Bay Storm season =

AFL football season

- Head coach: Tim Marcum
- Home stadium: ThunderDome

Results
- Record: 10–2
- Division place: 1st, Southern
- Playoffs: W Quarterfinals vs. Memphis; W Semifinals vs. Albany; W ArenaBowl vs. Orlando

The 1995 Tampa Bay Storm season was the ninth season for the Tampa Bay Storm. They finished the 1995 Arena Football League season 10–2 and ended the season with a win in ArenaBowl IX against the Orlando Predators.

== Schedule ==
=== Regular season ===
Week	Date	Opponent	Results		Game site (attendance)
Week	Date	Opponent	Final score	Team record	Game site (attendance)
1	May 13	at Miami Hooters	W 58–43	1–0	Miami Arena (6,978)
2	Bye				
3	May 27	Charlotte Rage	W 34–16	2–0	ThunderDome (12,426)
4	June 2	at Las Vegas Sting	W 69–55	3–0	Thomas & Mack Center (4,212)
5	June 10	Miami Hooters	W 47–55	4–0	ThunderDome (13,114)
6	June 17	at Albany Firebirds	L 36–42	4–1	Knickerbocker Arena (11,801)
7	June 24	Las Vegas Sting	L 37–38	4–2	ThunderDome (13,022)
8	July 1	Memphis Pharaohs	W 68–32	5–2	ThunderDome (14,209)
9	July 8	at Connecticut Coyotes	W 38–32	6–2	Hartford Civic Center (7,521)
10	July 14	at Orlando Predators	W 51–34	7–2	Orlando Arena (15,638)
11	July 21	Connecticut Coyotes	W 60–32	8–2	ThunderDome (12,825)
12	July 29	Orlando Predators	W 44–20	9–2	ThunderDome (24,055)
13	August 4	at Milwaukee Mustangs	W 56–27	10–2	Bradley Center (16,147)

=== Playoffs ===
The Storm were awarded the No. 1 overall seed in the AFL playoffs as a result of their league-best regular season record.

Round	Date	Opponent	Results		Game site (attendance)
Round	Date	Opponent	Final score	Playoff record	Game site (attendance)
Quarterfinals	August 12	(8) Memphis Pharaohs	W 53–41	1–0	ThunderDome (10,677)
Semifinals	August 18	(7) Albany Firebirds	W 56–49	2–0	ThunderDome (11,288)
ArenaBowl	September 1	(6) Orlando Predators	W 48–35	3–0	ThunderDome (25,087)

== Standings ==
Team	Overall			Division		
Team	Wins	Losses	Percentage	Wins	Losses	Percentage
National Conference
Eastern Division
Albany Firebirds	7	5	0.583	3	1	0.750
Charlotte Rage	5	7	0.417	3	1	0.750
Connecticut Coyotes	1	11	0.083	0	4	0.000
Southern Division
Tampa Bay Storm	10	2	0.833	4	0	1.000
Orlando Predators	7	5	0.583	2	2	0.500
Miami Hooters	1	11	0.083	0	4	0.000
American Conference
Central Division
St. Louis Stampede	9	3	0.750	4	2	0.667
Iowa Barnstormers	7	5	0.583	4	2	0.667
Memphis Pharaohs	6	6	0.500	3	3	0.500
Milwaukee Mustangs	4	8	0.333	1	5	0.167
Western Division
San Jose SaberCats	8	4	0.667	2	2	0.500
Arizona Rattlers	7	5	0.583	3	1	0.750
Las Vegas Sting	6	6	0.500	1	3	0.250

- Green indicates clinched playoff berth
- Blue indicates division champion
- Grey indicates best regular season record

== Awards ==
Position	Player	Award	All-Arena team
Quarterback	Jay Gruden	-	1st
Offensive/defensive lineman	Kent Wells	-	1st
Fullback/linebacker	Cedric McKinnon	-	2nd
Offensive/defensive lineman	Sylvester Bembery	-	2nd
Offensive/defensive lineman	Willie Wyatt	-	2nd
Defensive specialist	Corey Dowden	-	2nd
