= 1995 San Jose SaberCats season =

Arena Football League team season

- Head coach: Todd Shell
- Home stadium: San Jose Arena

Results
- Record: 8–4
- Division place: 1st, Western
- Playoffs: L Quarterfinals vs. Orlando

The 1995 San Jose SaberCats season was the first season for the San Jose SaberCats. They finished the 1995 Arena Football League season 8–4 and ended the season with a loss in the quarterfinals of the playoffs against the Orlando Predators.

== Schedule ==
=== Regular season ===
Week	Date	Opponent	Results		Game site (attendance)
Week	Date	Opponent	Final score	Team record	Game site (attendance)
1	May 12	Arizona Rattlers	L 37–43 (OT)	0–1	San Jose Arena (15,105)
2	May 20	at Las Vegas Sting	W 33–26	1–1	Thomas & Mack Center (4,105)
3	May 26	Memphis Pharaohs	L 30–41	1–2	San Jose Arena (13,043)
4	June 3	at Miami Hooters	W 50–22	2–2	Miami Arena (7,100)
5	June 9	Las Vegas Sting	W 35–31	3–2	San Jose Arena (12,892)
6	June 16	at Milwaukee Mustangs	L 47–64	3–3	Bradley Center (14,747)
7	June 24	at Iowa Barnstormers	W 33–17	4–3	Veterans Memorial Auditorium (11,411)
8	Bye				
9	July 7	at Charlotte Rage	W 66–35	5–3	Independence Arena (9,164)
10	July 14	Charlotte Rage	W 52–20	6–3	San Jose Arena (13,612)
11	July 22	Orlando Predators	W 54–27	7–3	San Jose Arena (14,431)
12	July 29	at Connecticut Coyotes	W 48–44	8–3	Hartford Civic Center (9,724)
13	August 6	Arizona Rattlers	L 40–41	8–4	San Jose Arena (15,569)

=== Playoffs ===
The SaberCats were awarded the No. 3 seed in the AFL playoffs.

Round	Date	Opponent	Results		Game site (attendance)
Round	Date	Opponent	Final score	Playoff record	Game site (attendance)
Quarterfinals	August 13	(6) Orlando Predators	L 37–55	0–1	San Jose Arena (13,471)

== Standings ==
Team	Overall			Division		
Team	Wins	Losses	Percentage	Wins	Losses	Percentage
National Conference
Eastern Division
Albany Firebirds	7	5	0.583	3	1	0.750
Charlotte Rage	5	7	0.417	3	1	0.750
Connecticut Coyotes	1	11	0.083	0	4	0.000
Southern Division
Tampa Bay Storm	10	2	0.833	4	0	1.000
Orlando Predators	7	5	0.583	2	2	0.500
Miami Hooters	1	11	0.083	0	4	0.000
American Conference
Central Division
St. Louis Stampede	9	3	0.750	4	2	0.667
Iowa Barnstormers	7	5	0.583	4	2	0.667
Memphis Pharaohs	6	6	0.500	3	3	0.500
Milwaukee Mustangs	4	8	0.333	1	5	0.167
Western Division
San Jose SaberCats	8	4	0.667	2	2	0.500
Arizona Rattlers	7	5	0.583	3	1	0.750
Las Vegas Sting	6	6	0.500	1	3	0.250

- Green indicates clinched playoff berth
- Blue indicates division champion
- Grey indicates best regular season record

== Awards ==
Position	Player	Award	All-Arena team
Defensive specialist	Patrick McGuirk	-	1st
Wide receiver/defensive back	Amod Field	-	2nd
Offensive specialist	Titus Dixon	-	2nd
