= 1995 Rhein Fire season =

World League of American Football team season

- General manager: Oliver Luck
- Head coach: Galen Hall
- Home stadium: Rheinstadion

Results
- Record: 4–6
- Division place: 5th
- Playoffs: did not qualify

The 1995 Rhein Fire season was the inaugural season for the franchise in the World League of American Football (WLAF). The team was led by head coach Galen Hall, and played its home games at Rheinstadion in Düsseldorf, Germany. They finished the regular season in fifth place with a record of four wins and six losses.

== Offseason ==
=== World League draft ===
1995 Rhein Fire World League draft selections
| Draft order | | | Player name | Position | College |
| Round | Choice | Overall | Player name | Position | College |
|---|---|---|---|---|---|
| 1 | 1 | 1 | Shaumbe Wright-Fair | RB | Washington State |
| 2 | 6 | 12 | Darrick Owens | WR | Mississippi |
| 3 | 1 | 13 | Mark Mason | RB | Maryland |
| 4 | 6 | 24 | Arthur Bussie | DE | Northeast Louisiana |
| 5 | 1 | 25 | Mike Withycombe | T | Fresno State |
| 6 | 6 | 36 | Greg Lane | CB | Notre Dame |
| 7 | 1 | 37 | Vaughn Bryant | CB | Stanford |
| 8 | 6 | 48 | Jason Atkinson | LB | Texas A&M |
| 9 | 1 | 49 | Akili Calhoun | DT | Hawaii |
| 10 | 6 | 60 | Terry Crews | LB | Western Michigan |
| 11 | 1 | 61 | Mike Alexander | C | San Diego State |
| 12 | 6 | 72 | Marquise Thomas | LB | Mississippi |
| 13 | 1 | 73 | Rod Moore | WR | Utah State |
| 14 | 6 | 84 | Matt Gay | S | Kansas |
| 15 | 1 | 85 | Don Stowers | CB | New Mexico State |
| 16 | 6 | 96 | Andy Kelly | QB | Tennessee |
| 17 | 1 | 97 | Mack Travis | DT | California |
| 18 | 6 | 108 | Leroy Smith | LB | Iowa |
| 19 | 1 | 109 | Jose Munoz | T | Ball State |
| 20 | 6 | 120 | Victor Brown | CB | Tennessee |
| 21 | 1 | 121 | Mike Salmon | S | Southern California |
| 22 | 6 | 132 | Deron Pointer | WR | Washington State |
| 23 | 1 | 133 | Jay Hillman | RB | Boston University |
| 24 | 6 | 144 | Willie Felton | TE | Bethune-Cookman |
| 25 | 1 | 145 | Nick Ma'afala | DT | Hawaii |
| 26 | 6 | 156 | Ronald Williams | RB | Clemson |
| 27 | 1 | 157 | Tony Lenseigne | TE | Eastern Washington |
| 28 | 6 | 168 | Brandon Houston | T | Oklahoma |
| 29 | 1 | 169 | Anthony Fieldings | LB | Morningside |
| 30 | 6 | 180 | Tony Rowell | C | Florida |
| 31 | 1 | 181 | Charles Beauchamp | LB | Indiana |
| 32 | 6 | 192 | Turhon O'Bannon | WR | New Mexico |
| 33 | 1 | 193 | Don Chaney | TE | South Carolina |
| 34 | 6 | 204 | Karl Nieberlein | T | Towson State |
| 35 | 1 | 205 | Cisco Richard | RB | Northeast Louisiana |
| 36 | 6 | 216 | Jerry Sharp | G | Syracuse |
| 37 | 1 | 217 | Junior Tagoai | NT | Hawaii |
| 38 | 6 | 228 | Kavin Crawford | DE | Louisiana Tech |
| 39 | 1 | 229 | Mark Sturdivant | DE | Maryland |
| 40 | 6 | 240 | Bill Durkin | G | Massachusetts |
| 41 | 1 | 241 | Carey Broudy | S | Louisiana Tech |
| 42 | 6 | 252 | Tre Everett | WR | Florida |
| 43 | 1 | 253 | Donald Douglas | S | Houston |
| 44 | 6 | 264 | Bob Tavernaro | CB | Pittsburg State |
| 45 | 1 | 265 | Mike Collins | S | West Virginia |
| 46 | 5 | 275 | Joey Veargis | LB | Central State (OH) |

=== NFL allocations ===
| Player name | Position | College | NFL team |
|---|---|---|---|
| Karl Dunbar | DE | Louisiana State | Arizona Cardinals |
| Tyrone Johnson | WR | Western State (CO) | New Orleans Saints |
| Alan Kline | T | Ohio State | New Orleans Saints |
| Doug Nussmeier | QB | Idaho | New Orleans Saints |
| Tom Roth | G | Southern Illinois | New Orleans Saints |
| Gino Torretta | QB | Miami (FL) | Detroit Lions |

== Personnel ==
=== Staff ===
1995 Rhein Fire staff
| Front office: General manager – Oliver Luck; Head coaches: Head coach/running backs – Galen Hall; Offensive coaches: Offensive coordinator/quarterbacks – Don Strock; Wide receivers – Wes Chandler; Offensive line – Dean Unruh | Defensive coaches: Defensive coordinator/linebackers – A. J. Duhe; National coach/defensive line – Walter Rohlfing; Defensive backs/special teams – Jeff Reinebold |

=== Roster ===
1995 Rhein Fire final roster
| Quarterbacks: 12 John Gieselman; 7 Andy Kelly P; 12 Doug Nussmeier; 14 Doug Pederson; 13 Gino Torretta; Running backs: 44 Jay Hillman; 26 Ronald Williams; 32 Shaumbe Wright-Fair; 33 Charlie Young; Wide receivers: 83 Tyrone Johnson; 82 Rod Moore; 81 Darrick Owens; 1 Deron Pointer; Tight ends: 84 Tony Lenseigne; 45 Sean Russell | Offensive linemen: 60 Mike Alexander C; 71 Bill Durkin G; 76 Alan Kline T; 73 Jose Munoz T; 68 Tom Roth G/T; 56 Tony Rowell G/C; Defensive linemen: 61 Arthur Bussie DE; 78 Karl Dunbar DE; 95 Nick Ma'afala DT; 79 Joe Seumalo DE; 99 Junior Tagoai DT; 94 Mack Travis DT | Linebackers: 34 Jason Atkinson; 59 Terry Crews; 50 Anthony Fieldings; 52 Leroy Smith; Defensive backs: 29 Vaughn Bryant CB; 39 Donald Douglas S; 40 Matt Gay S; 28 Greg Lane CB; 20 Jeff Parker CB; 42 Mike Salmon S; 27 Don Stowers CB; Special teams: 11 Giulio Caravatta K/P; 6 Arden Czyzewski K/P | National players: 58 (Germany) Claus Biedermann LB; 75 (Germany) Peter Gross-Pass DE; 21 (Germany) Andreas Motzkus S; 67 (Germany) Gerald Olszewski G; 5 (Germany) Andreas Schröder K; 80 (Germany) Max von Garnier WR; Rookies in italics |

== Schedule ==
| Week | Date | Kickoff (Note: All times local to where the game was played.) | Opponent | Results | | Game site | Attendance |
| Week | Date | Kickoff | Opponent | Final score | Team record | Game site | Attendance |
|---|---|---|---|---|---|---|---|
| 1 | Sunday, April 9 | 3:00 p.m. | at Scottish Claymores | W 19–17 | 1–0 | Murrayfield Stadium | 10,346 |
| 2 | Saturday, April 15 | 7:00 p.m. | London Monarchs | L 7–23 | 1–1 | Rheinstadion | 15,892 |
| 3 | Saturday, April 22 | 5:30 p.m. | at Barcelona Dragons | L 30–32 | 1–2 | Estadi Olímpic de Montjuïc | 17,900 |
| 4 | Sunday, April 30 | 7:00 p.m. | Frankfurt Galaxy | W 21–20 | 2–2 | Rheinstadion | 19,181 |
| 5 | Saturday, May 6 | 7:00 p.m. | at Amsterdam Admirals | L 10–30 | 2–3 | Olympisch Stadion | 8,153 |
| 6 | Saturday, May 13 | 7:00 p.m. | Scottish Claymores | W 33–27 ^{OT} | 3–3 | Rheinstadion | 6,981 |
| 7 | Saturday, May 20 | 7:00 p.m. | at Frankfurt Galaxy | W 41–28 | 4–3 | Waldstadion | 33,112 |
| 8 | Monday, May 29 | 3:00 p.m. | at London Monarchs | L 14–34 | 4–4 | White Hart Lane | 12,342 |
| 9 | Saturday, June 3 | 7:00 p.m. | Barcelona Dragons | L 21–31 | 4–5 | Rheinstadion | 12,323 |
| 10 | Saturday, June 10 | 7:00 p.m. | Amsterdam Admirals | L 25–37 | 4–6 | Rheinstadion | 7,961 |

== Standings ==
World League of American Football
| Team | W | L | T | PCT | PF | PA | Home | Road | STK |
|---|---|---|---|---|---|---|---|---|---|
| Amsterdam Admirals | 9 | 1 | 0 | .900 | 246 | 152 | 5–0 | 4–1 | W2 |
| Frankfurt Galaxy | 6 | 4 | 0 | .600 | 279 | 202 | 3–2 | 3–2 | W3 |
| Barcelona Dragons | 5 | 5 | 0 | .500 | 237 | 247 | 2–3 | 3–2 | L1 |
| London Monarchs | 4 | 6 | 0 | .400 | 174 | 220 | 1–4 | 3–2 | L2 |
| Rhein Fire | 4 | 6 | 0 | .400 | 221 | 279 | 2–3 | 2–3 | L3 |
| Scottish Claymores | 2 | 8 | 0 | .200 | 153 | 210 | 0–5 | 2–3 | W1 |

== Game summaries ==
=== Week 1: at Scottish Claymores ===
Week One: Rhein Fire at Scottish Claymores – Game summary

| Quarter | 1 | 2 | 3 | 4 | Total |
|---|---|---|---|---|---|
| Rhein | 7 | 0 | 6 | 6 | 19 |
| Scotland | 0 | 10 | 0 | 7 | 17 |

at Murrayfield Stadium, Edinburgh, Scotland

- Date: Sunday, April 9
- Game time: 3:00 p.m. BST
- Game attendance: 10,346

=== Week 2: vs London Monarchs ===
Week Two: London Monarchs at Rhein Fire – Game summary

| Quarter | 1 | 2 | 3 | 4 | Total |
|---|---|---|---|---|---|
| London | 3 | 10 | 7 | 3 | 23 |
| Rhein | 7 | 0 | 0 | 0 | 7 |

at Rheinstadion, Düsseldorf, Germany

- Date: Saturday, April 15
- Game time: 7:00 p.m. CEST
- Game attendance: 15,892
- Referee: Larry Nemmers

=== Week 3: at Barcelona Dragons ===
Week Three: Rhein Fire at Barcelona Dragons – Game summary

| Quarter | 1 | 2 | Total |
|---|---|---|---|
| Rhein | | | 0 |
| Barcelona | | | 0 |

at Estadi Olímpic de Montjuïc, Barcelona, Spain

- Date: Saturday, April 22
- Game time: 5:30 p.m. CEST
- Game attendance: 17,900

=== Week 4: vs Frankfurt Galaxy ===
Week Four: Frankfurt Galaxy at Rhein Fire – Game summary

| Quarter | 1 | 2 | Total |
|---|---|---|---|
| Frankfurt | | | 0 |
| Rhein | | | 0 |

at Rheinstadion, Düsseldorf, Germany

- Date: Sunday, April 30
- Game time: 7:00 p.m. CEST
- Game attendance: 19,181

=== Week 5: at Amsterdam Admirals ===
Week Five: Rhein Fire at Amsterdam Admirals – Game summary

| Quarter | 1 | 2 | 3 | 4 | Total |
|---|---|---|---|---|---|
| Rhein | 3 | 0 | 7 | 0 | 10 |
| Amsterdam | 6 | 21 | 3 | 0 | 30 |

at Olympisch Stadion, Amsterdam, Netherlands

- Date: Saturday, May 6
- Game time: 7:00 p.m. CEST
- Game attendance: 8,153

=== Week 6: vs Scottish Claymores ===
Week Six: Scottish Claymores at Rhein Fire – Game summary

| Quarter | 1 | 2 | Total |
|---|---|---|---|
| Scotland | | | 0 |
| Rhein | | | 0 |

at Rheinstadion, Düsseldorf, Germany

- Date: Saturday, May 13
- Game time: 7:00 p.m. CEST
- Game attendance: 6,981

=== Week 7: at Frankfurt Galaxy ===
Week Seven: Rhein Fire at Frankfurt Galaxy – Game summary

| Quarter | 1 | 2 | Total |
|---|---|---|---|
| Rhein | | | 0 |
| Frankfurt | | | 0 |

at Waldstadion, Frankfurt, Germany

- Date: Saturday, May 20
- Game time: 7:00 p.m. CEST
- Game attendance: 33,112

=== Week 8: at London Monarchs ===
Week Eight: Rhein Fire at London Monarchs – Game summary

| Quarter | 1 | 2 | Total |
|---|---|---|---|
| Rhein | | | 0 |
| London | | | 0 |

at White Hart Lane, London, England

- Date: Monday, May 29
- Game time: 3:00 p.m. BST
- Game attendance: 12,342

=== Week 9: vs Barcelona Dragons ===
Week Nine: Barcelona Dragons at Rhein Fire – Game summary

| Quarter | 1 | 2 | Total |
|---|---|---|---|
| Barcelona | | | 0 |
| Rhein | | | 0 |

at Rheinstadion, Düsseldorf, Germany

- Date: Saturday, June 3
- Game time: 7:00 p.m. CEST
- Game attendance: 12,323

=== Week 10: vs Amsterdam Admirals ===
Week Ten: Amsterdam Admirals at Rhein Fire – Game summary

| Quarter | 1 | 2 | 3 | 4 | Total |
|---|---|---|---|---|---|
| Amsterdam | 7 | 0 | 7 | 23 | 37 |
| Rhein | 0 | 6 | 0 | 19 | 25 |

at Rheinstadion, Düsseldorf, Germany

- Date: Saturday, June 10
- Game time: 7:00 p.m. CEST
- Game attendance: 7,961
