= 1995 Miami Hooters season =

American professional football season

- Head coach: John Fourcade
- Home stadium: Miami Arena

Results
- Record: 1–11
- Division place: 3rd, Southern
- Playoffs: Did not make playoffs

The 1995 Miami Hooters season was the fourth and final season for the Miami Hooters before their rebrand as the Florida Bobcats. They finished the 1995 Arena Football League season 1–11 and were the only team in the Southern Division to not make the playoffs.

== Regular season ==
=== Schedule ===
Week	Date	Opponent	Results		Game site (attendance)
Week	Date	Opponent	Final score	Team record	Game site (attendance)
1	May 13	Tampa Bay Storm	L 43–58	0–1	Miami Arena (6,978)
2	May 20	at Iowa Barnstormers	L 29–41	0–2	Veterans' Memorial Auditorium (10,628)
3	May 26	at Orlando Predators	L 13–51	0–3	Amway Arena (15,638)
4	June 3	San Jose SaberCats	L 22–50	0–4	Miami Arena (7,100)
5	June 10	at Tampa Bay Storm	L 7–54	0–5	ThunderDome (13,114)
6	June 17	Orlando Predators	L 29–48	0–6	Miami Arena (6,700)
7	June 24	at Memphis Pharaohs	L 24–40	0–7	Pyramid Arena (11,285)
8	July 1	Connecticut Coyotes	L 39–60	0–8	Miami Arena (4,500)
9	July 8	Las Vegas Sting	W 32–30	1–8	Miami Arena (3,875)
10	July 15	at Albany Firebirds	L 56–82	1–9	Knickerbocker Arena (11,209)
11	July 22	at Arizona Rattlers	L 29–52	1–10	Talking Stick Resort Arena (15,505)
12	July 28	St. Louis Stampede	L 38–43	1–11	Miami Arena (8,406)

=== Standings ===
Team	Overall			Division		
Team	Wins	Losses	Percentage	Wins	Losses	Percentage
National Conference
Eastern Division
Albany Firebirds	7	5	0.583	3	1	0.750
Charlotte Rage	5	7	0.417	3	1	0.750
Connecticut Coyotes	1	11	0.083	0	4	0.000
Southern Division
Tampa Bay Storm	10	2	0.833	4	0	1.000
Orlando Predators	7	5	0.583	2	2	0.500
Miami Hooters	1	11	0.083	0	4	0.000
American Conference
Central Division
St. Louis Stampede	9	3	0.750	4	2	0.667
Iowa Barnstormers	7	5	0.583	4	2	0.667
Memphis Pharaohs	6	6	0.500	3	3	0.500
Milwaukee Mustangs	4	8	0.333	1	5	0.167
Western Division
San Jose SaberCats	8	4	0.667	2	2	0.500
Arizona Rattlers	7	5	0.583	3	1	0.750
Las Vegas Sting	6	6	0.500	1	3	0.250

- Green indicates clinched playoff berth
- Blue indicates division champion
- Grey indicates best regular season record

== Awards ==
Position	Player	Award	All-Arena team
Wide receiver/defensive back	Bernard Edwards	-	1st
