= 1995 Las Vegas Sting season =

Arena Football League team season

- Head coach: Babe Parilli
- Home stadium: Thomas & Mack Center

Results
- Record: 6–6
- Division place: 3rd, Western
- Playoffs: Did not make playoffs

The 1995 Las Vegas Sting season was the second season for the Las Vegas Sting. They finished the 1995 Arena Football League season 6–6 and were one of two teams in the American Conference to miss the playoffs.

== Schedule ==
=== Regular season ===
Week	Date	Opponent	Results		Game site (attendance)
Week	Date	Opponent	Final score	Team record	Game site (attendance)
1	Bye				
2	May 20	San Jose SaberCats	L 27–32	0–1	Thomas & Mack Center (4,105)
3	May 27	at Arizona Rattlers	L 69–72	0–2	America West Arena (15,435)
4	June 2	Tampa Bay Storm	L 55–69	0–3	Thomas & Mack Center (4,212)
5	June 9	at San Jose SaberCats	L 31–35	0–4	San Jose Arena (12,892)
6	June 17	St. Louis Stampede	W 57–25	1–4	Thomas & Mack Center (6,144)
7	June 24	at Tampa Bay Storm	W 38–37	2–4	ThunderDome (13,022)
8	June 30	Milwaukee Mustangs	W 45–35	3–4	Thomas & Mack Center (5,483)
9	July 8	at Miami Hooters	L 30–32	3–5	Miami Arena (3,875)
10	July 14	Memphis Pharaohs	L 30–38	3–6	Thomas & Mack Center (4,753)
11	July 21	at Iowa Barnstormers	W 40–34	4–6	Veterans Memorial Auditorium (11,411)
12	July 29	Arizona Rattlers	W 60–46	5–6	Thomas & Mack Center (5,621)
13	August 4	at Charlotte Rage	W 50–43	6–6	Independence Arena (7,746)

== Standings ==
Team	Overall			Division		
Team	Wins	Losses	Percentage	Wins	Losses	Percentage
National Conference
Eastern Division
Albany Firebirds	7	5	0.583	3	1	0.750
Charlotte Rage	5	7	0.417	3	1	0.750
Connecticut Coyotes	1	11	0.083	0	4	0.000
Southern Division
Tampa Bay Storm	10	2	0.833	4	0	1.000
Orlando Predators	7	5	0.583	2	2	0.500
Miami Hooters	1	11	0.083	0	4	0.000
American Conference
Central Division
St. Louis Stampede	9	3	0.750	4	2	0.667
Iowa Barnstormers	7	5	0.583	4	2	0.667
Memphis Pharaohs	6	6	0.500	3	3	0.500
Milwaukee Mustangs	4	8	0.333	1	5	0.167
Western Division
San Jose SaberCats	8	4	0.667	2	2	0.500
Arizona Rattlers	7	5	0.583	3	1	0.750
Las Vegas Sting	6	6	0.500	1	3	0.250

- Green indicates clinched playoff berth
- Blue indicates division champion
- Grey indicates best regular season record

== Awards ==
Position	Player	Award	All-Arena team
Offensive/defensive lineman	Sam Hernandez	-	1st
Kicker	Ian Howfield	-	2nd
