= Darren Hughes (gridiron football) =

American gridiron football player (born 1967)

No. 21, 27
- Positions: Wide receiver, defensive back

Personal information
- Born: June 3, 1967 (age 59); Los Angeles, California, U.S.
- Listed height: 6 ft 1 in (1.85 m)
- Listed weight: 180 lb (82 kg)

Career information
- High school: Lynwood (Lynwood, California)
- College: Carson–Newman
- NFL draft: 1991: 12th round, 313th overall pick

Career history
- Minnesota Vikings (1991)*; → Ohio Glory (1992); Toronto Argonauts (1993); Memphis Pharaohs (1995–1996); Charlotte Rage (1996); Connecticut Coyotes (1996); Nashville Kats (1997)*; Florida Bobcats (1997–2000); Los Angeles Avengers (2001)
- * Offseason or practice squad member only

Awards and highlights
- Second-team All-Arena (1995); First-team All-SAC (1990)

Career AFL statistics
- Receptions: 235
- Receiving yards: 3,102
- Receiving TDs: 47
- Tackles: 174.5
- Interceptions: 9
- Stats at ArenaFan.com

Darren L. Hughes (born June 3, 1967) is an American former professional football player who played seven seasons in the Arena Football League (AFL) with the Memphis Pharaohs, Connecticut Coyotes, Charlotte Rage, Florida Bobcats and Los Angeles Avengers. He was selected by the Minnesota Vikings in the 12th round of the 1991 NFL draft after playing college football at Carson–Newman University. He was also a member of the Ohio Glory and Toronto Argonauts.

== Early life and college ==
Darren L. Hughes was born on June 3, 1967, in Los Angeles, California. He attended Lynwood High School in Lynwood, California.

Hughes played college football for the Carson–Newman Eagles of Carson–Newman University as a wide receiver. He earned first-team All-South Atlantic Conference honors during his senior year in 1990.

== Professional career ==
Hughes was selected by the Minnesota Vikings in the 12th round, with the 313th overall pick, of the 1991 NFL draft as a wide receiver. He was waived on August 20 and then signed to the team's practice squad, where he spent the entire 1991 season. He became a free agent after the season and re-signed with the Vikings. In February 1992, the Vikings allocated him to the World League of American Football (WLAF) to play for the Ohio Glory. He totaled six receptions for 32 yards, one interception, and one sack for the Glory during the 1992 WLAF season. Hughes was waived by the Vikings on August 31, 1992.

Hughes played in 11 games for the Toronto Argonauts of the Canadian Football League in 1993 as a defensive halfback, recording 40 defensive tackles, eight special teams, three interceptions, and one fumble recovery.

He appeared in 11 games for the Memphis Pharaohs of the Arena Football League (AFL) in 1995, accumulating 60 receptions for 939 yards and 13 touchdowns, 27 solo tackles, four assisted tackles, three interceptions, five pass breakups, fumble recovery, and three kick returns for 27 yards and one touchdown. He was a wide receiver/defensive back during his time in the AFL as the league played under ironman rules. Hughes was named second-team All-Arena for the 1995 season. The Pharaohs finished the year with a 6–6 record and lost in the first round of the playoffs to the Tampa Bay Storm. He played in seven games for the Pharaohs during the 1996 season, catching 30 passes for 431 yards and ten touchdowns while also posting solo tackle.

On June 12, 1996, Hughes was traded to the Charlotte Rage for Jeff Parker and Chris Poston. Hughes played in five games for the Rage that year, accumulating 12 receptions for 116 yards and four touchdowns, 11 solo tackles, and two assisted tackles.

He finished the 1996 AFL season by playing in one game for the Connecticut Coyotes, catching one pass for 12 yards and returning one kick for six yards.

On November 22, 1996, it was reported that Hughes had been selected by the Nashville Kats in the 1996 expansion draft. On November 26, 1996, Hughes, Arnold Campbell, and Pierre Hixon were traded to the Florida Bobcats for Fran Papasedero. Hughes appeared in 11 games for the Bobcats in 1997, totaling 21 catches for 253 yards and three touchdowns, 17 solo tackles, five assisted tackles, two interceptions, and one pass breakup as Florida finished 4–10. He played in 13 games during the 1998 season, recording 26 receptions for 348 yards and seven touchdowns, 41 solo tackles, 11 assisted tackles, two interceptions, eight pass breakups, and 16 kick returns for 306 yards. The Bobcats had a 3–11 record that year. He appeared in 13, games for the second straight season in 1999, catching 53 passes for 677 yards and six touchdowns while also totaling 26 solo tackles, six assisted tackles, one interception, four pass breakups, and one forced fumble. Florida finished 3–11 for the second straight year in 1999. Hughes played in 13 games for the Bobcats for the third consecutive season in 2000, accumulating 20 receptions for 195 yards and one touchdown, 18 solo tackles, four assisted, one interception, and three pass breakups. The Bobcats had a 3–11 record for the fourth consecutive season in 2000.

On December 19, 2000, it was reported that Hughes had signed with the Los Angeles Avengers of the AFL. He was placed on injured reserve on April 9, 2001, and later activated on May 15. Overall, he played in nine games for the Avengers during the 2001 season, totaling 12 receptions for 131 yards and three touchdowns, 12 solo tackles, three assisted tackles, and two pass breakups. Hughes was released on December 10, 2001.
