= 1995 Orlando Predators season =

Arena Football League team season

- Head coach: Perry Moss
- Home stadium: Orlando Arena

Results
- Record: 7–5
- Division place: 2nd, Southern
- Playoffs: W Quarterfinals vs. San Jose; W Semifinals vs. Iowa; L ArenaBowl vs. Tampa Bay

The 1995 Orlando Predators season was the fifth season for the Orlando Predators. They finished the 1995 Arena Football League season 7–5 and ended the season with a loss in ArenaBowl IX against the Tampa Bay Storm.

== Schedule ==
=== Regular season ===
Week	Date	Opponent	Results		Game site (attendance)
Week	Date	Opponent	Final score	Team record	Game site (attendance)
1	May 13	at Connecticut Coyotes	W 45–43	1–0	Hartford Civic Center (7,643)
2	May 19	at Charlotte Rage	L 38–41	1–1	Independence Arena (6,665)
3	May 26	Miami Hooters	W 51–13	2–1	Orlando Arena (15,638)
4	Bye				
5	June 9	Albany Firebirds	W 55–47	3–1	Orlando Arena (15,638)
6	June 17	at Miami Hooters	W 48–29	4–1	Miami Arena (6,700)
7	June 23	Milwaukee Mustangs	W 58–33	5–1	Orlando Arena (13,022)
8	July 1	Arizona Rattlers	L 48–49	5–2	Orlando Arena (15,638)
9	July 8	at Albany Firebirds	W 56–38	6–2	Knickerbocker Arena (12,868)
10	July 14	Tampa Bay Storm	L 34–51	6–3	Orlando Arena (15,638)
11	July 22	at San Jose SaberCats	L 27–54	6–4	San Jose Arena (14,431)
12	July 29	at Tampa Bay Storm	L 20–44	6–5	ThunderDome (24,055)
13	August 4	Connecticut Coyotes	W 62–29	7–5	Orlando Arena (15,638)

=== Playoffs ===
The Predators were awarded the No. 6 seed in the AFL playoffs.

Round	Date	Opponent	Results		Game site (attendance)
Round	Date	Opponent	Final score	Playoff record	Game site (attendance)
Quarterfinals	August 13	at (3) San Jose SaberCats	W 55–37	1–0	San Jose Arena (13,471)
Semifinals	August 19	at (5) Iowa Barnstormers	W 56–49	2–0	Veterans Memorial Auditorium (11,411)
ArenaBowl	September 1	at (1) Tampa Bay Storm	L 35–48	2–1	ThunderDome (25,087)

== Standings ==
Team	Overall			Division		
Team	Wins	Losses	Percentage	Wins	Losses	Percentage
National Conference
Eastern Division
Albany Firebirds	7	5	0.583	3	1	0.750
Charlotte Rage	5	7	0.417	3	1	0.750
Connecticut Coyotes	1	11	0.083	0	4	0.000
Southern Division
Tampa Bay Storm	10	2	0.833	4	0	1.000
Orlando Predators	7	5	0.583	2	2	0.500
Miami Hooters	1	11	0.083	0	4	0.000
American Conference
Central Division
St. Louis Stampede	9	3	0.750	4	2	0.667
Iowa Barnstormers	7	5	0.583	4	2	0.667
Memphis Pharaohs	6	6	0.500	3	3	0.500
Milwaukee Mustangs	4	8	0.333	1	5	0.167
Western Division
San Jose SaberCats	8	4	0.667	2	2	0.500
Arizona Rattlers	7	5	0.583	3	1	0.750
Las Vegas Sting	6	6	0.500	1	3	0.250

- Green indicates clinched playoff berth
- Blue indicates division champion
- Grey indicates best regular season record

== Awards ==
Position	Player	Award	All-Arena team
Wide receiver/defensive back	Barry Wagner	Ironman of the Year; Most Valuable Player	1st
Owner	Don Dizney	Commissioner's Award	-
