= 1995 Memphis Pharaohs season =

American football season

- Head coach: Don Frease
- Home stadium: Pyramid Arena

Results
- Record: 6–6
- Division place: 3rd, Central
- Playoffs: L Quarterfinals vs. Tampa Bay

The 1995 Memphis Pharaohs season was the first season for the Memphis Pharaohs. They finished the 1995 Arena Football League season 6–6 and ended the season with a loss in the quarterfinals of the playoffs against the Tampa Bay Storm.

== Schedule ==
=== Regular season ===
Week	Date	Opponent	Results		Game site (attendance)
Week	Date	Opponent	Final score	Team record	Game site (attendance)
1	May 12	at St. Louis Stampede	L 22–35	0–1	Kiel Center (10,675)
2	May 19	Milwaukee Mustangs	W 33–26	1–1	Pyramid Arena (8,887)
3	May 26	at San Jose SaberCats	W 41–30	2–1	San Jose Arena (13,043)
4	June 2	Arizona Rattlers	L 33–48	2–2	Pyramid Arena (11,081)
5	Bye				
6	June 16	at Iowa Barnstormers	W 57–54 (OT)	3–2	Veterans Memorial Auditorium (10,187)
7	June 24	Miami Hooters	W 40–24	4–2	Pyramid Arena (11,285)
8	July 1	at Tampa Bay Storm	L 32–68	4–3	ThunderDome (14,209)
9	July 8	St. Louis Stampede	W 55–33	5–3	Pyramid Arena (11,481)
10	July 14	at Las Vegas Sting	W 38–30	6–3	Thomas & Mack Center (4,753)
11	July 22	Albany Firebirds	L 39–45	6–4	Pyramid Arena (11,853)
12	July 28	at Milwaukee Mustangs	L 37–53	6–5	Bradley Center (15,471)
13	August 5	Iowa Barnstormers	L 32–45	6–6	Pyramid Arena (12,621)

=== Playoffs ===
The Pharaohs were awarded the No. 8 seed in the AFL playoffs.

Round	Date	Opponent	Results		Game site (attendance)
Round	Date	Opponent	Final score	Playoff record	Game site (attendance)
Quarterfinals	August 12	at (1) Tampa Bay Storm	L 41–53	0–1	ThunderDome (10,677)

== Standings ==
Team	Overall			Division		
Team	Wins	Losses	Percentage	Wins	Losses	Percentage
National Conference
Eastern Division
Albany Firebirds	7	5	0.583	3	1	0.750
Charlotte Rage	5	7	0.417	3	1	0.750
Connecticut Coyotes	1	11	0.083	0	4	0.000
Southern Division
Tampa Bay Storm	10	2	0.833	4	0	1.000
Orlando Predators	7	5	0.583	2	2	0.500
Miami Hooters	1	11	0.083	0	4	0.000
American Conference
Central Division
St. Louis Stampede	9	3	0.750	4	2	0.667
Iowa Barnstormers	7	5	0.583	4	2	0.667
Memphis Pharaohs	6	6	0.500	3	3	0.500
Milwaukee Mustangs	4	8	0.333	1	5	0.167
Western Division
San Jose SaberCats	8	4	0.667	2	2	0.500
Arizona Rattlers	7	5	0.583	3	1	0.750
Las Vegas Sting	6	6	0.500	1	3	0.250

- Green indicates clinched playoff berth
- Blue indicates division champion
- Grey indicates best regular season record

== Awards ==
Position	Player	Award	All-Arena team
Wide receiver/defensive back	Darren Hughes	-	2nd
