= Kelly Blackwell =

American football player (born 1969)

No. 89
- Position: Tight end

Personal information
- Born: February 13, 1969 (age 57); Blytheville, Arkansas, U.S.
- Listed height: 6 ft 1 in (1.85 m)
- Listed weight: 255 lb (116 kg)

Career information
- High school: Richland (North Richland Hills, Texas)
- College: TCU
- NFL draft: 1992: undrafted

Career history
- Chicago Bears (1992); Dallas Cowboys (1993); Los Angeles Rams (1993); Fort Worth Cavalry (1994); Connecticut Coyotes (1995)*
- * Offseason or practice squad member only

Awards and highlights
- Super Bowl champion (XXVIII); Consensus All-American (1991); Third-team All-American (1990); 2× First-team All-SWC (1990, 1991)

Career NFL statistics
- Receptions: 5
- Receiving yards: 54
- Stats at Pro Football Reference

Career AFL statistics
- Rushing yards: 46
- Rushing touchdowns: 3
- Tackles: 8
- Sacks: 3
- Stats at ArenaFan.com

Kelly Reardon Blackwell (born February 13, 1969) is an American former professional football player who was a tight end in the National Football League (NFL) for the Chicago Bears and Dallas Cowboys. He also was a member of the Fort Worth Cavalry in the Arena Football League (AFL). He played college football for the TCU Horned Frogs, earning consensus All-American honors in 1991.

== Early life ==
Blackwell attended Richland High School. He accepted a football scholarship from Texas Christian University. As a freshman, he was named the starter at tight end and appeared in 11 games. He collected 20 receptions (second on the team), 172 receiving yards (third on the team) and no touchdowns.

As a sophomore, he appeared in 8 games, tallying 33 receptions (second on the team), 389 receiving yards (third on the team) and 2 receiving touchdowns (second on the team).

As a junior, he appeared in 11 games, registering 64 receptions (school record), 832 receiving yards (third in school history) and 5 receiving touchdowns (tied for second on the team). He tied for third all-time in receptions in a single-game with 12 catches against the University of Missouri.

As a senior, he appeared in 9 games, leading the team with 64 receptions (tied his school record) for 762 yards (eighth in school history) and 6 touchdowns. He had 11 receptions against the University of Houston to set an NCAA record for most career receptions by a tight end. He was named to the All-America Team. He finished his career with 181 receptions (school record), 2,155 receiving yards (fourth in school history) and 13 receiving touchdowns (third in school history).

In 2001, he was inducted into the TCU Lettermen's Association Hall of Fame.

== Professional career ==
Blackwell was signed as an undrafted free agent by the Chicago Bears after the 1992 NFL draft. As a rookie, he appeared in 16 games with 2 starts, making 5 receptions for 54 yards.

On August 17, 1993, after Cowboys defensive coordinator Dave Wannstedt became the head coach for the Chicago Bears, he traded Blackwell, linebacker John Roper and safety Markus Paul, in exchange for linebacker Vinson Smith, linebacker Barry Minter and a sixth-round draft pick (#198-Carl Reeves). He appeared in 2 games with no stats. On October 5, 1993, he was released to make room for tight end Jim Price. The team would go on to win Super Bowl XXVIII.

On December 30, 1993, he signed as a free agent with the Los Angeles Rams. On June 1, 1994, he was released before the start of the season.

In June 1994, he signed with the Fort Worth Cavalry of the Arena Football League. He was a two-way player at fullback and linebacker. He registered 2 receptions for 18 yards, 17 carries for 46 yards, 13 tackles, 3 sacks, one fumble recovery and one blocked kick.

On December 12, 1994, he was selected by the Connecticut Coyotes in the Arena Football League expansion draft. He was waived on May 3, 1995.
