= Hesham Ismail =

American football player (born 1969)

No. 70
- Position: Offensive lineman

Personal information
- Born: June 11, 1969 (age 57); Gainesville, Florida, U.S.
- Listed height: 6 ft 3 in (1.91 m)
- Listed weight: 285 lb (129 kg)

Career information
- High school: Auburndale (Auburndale, Florida)
- College: Florida (1987–1991)
- NFL draft: 1992: 8th round, 206th overall pick

Career history
- Pittsburgh Steelers (1992)*; Houston Oilers (1993)*; Tampa Bay Storm (1994); Baltimore Colts (1994)*; Miami Hooters (1995)*; Scottish Claymores (1995)
- * Offseason or practice squad member only

Awards and highlights
- Third-team All-American (1991); First-team All-SEC (1991)
- Stats at ArenaFan.com

Hesham Mohammed Ismail (born June 11, 1969) is an American former professional football offensive lineman. He played college football for the Florida Gators and was selected by the Pittsburgh Steelers in the eighth round of the 1992 NFL draft. He also played for the Tampa Bay Storm of the Arena Football League (AFL) and the Scottish Claymores of the World League of American Football (WLAF).

== Early life ==
Hesham Mohammed Ismail was born on June 11, 1969, in Gainesville, Florida. His parents are from Egypt. He attended Auburndale High School in Auburndale, Florida. Ismail earned Class 4A first-team all-state honors as a senior in 1986.

== College career ==
Ismail was a four-year letterman for the Florida Gators of the University of Florida from 1988 to 1991. He redshirted in 1987 after tearing ankle tendons during a scrimmage. He played in eight games, starting two, at right guard as a redshirt freshman in 1988. In 1989, Ismail appeared in every game as a backup left guard behind Mark White. Ismail was then a two-year starter at left guard from 1990 to 1991. He earned Associated Press (AP) third-team All-American and AP and Coaches first-team All-SEC honors his senior year in 1991. He played in 44 games, starting the final 22, during his college career. Ismail majored in exercise and sports science.

== Professional career ==
Ismail was selected by the Pittsburgh Steelers in the eighth round, with the 206th overall pick, of the 1992 NFL draft. He officially signed with the team on July 14, 1992. He was waived on August 25, 1992.

Ismail signed with the Houston Oilers on June 9, 1993. He was cut on August 19, 1993.

Ismail was signed by the Tampa Bay Storm of the Arena Football League in April 1994. He spent the first three weeks of the 1994 season on injured reserve. On June 27, 1994, it was reported that Ismail had signed with the Baltimore Colts of the Canadian Football League. However, he ended up failing his physical with the Colts due to a hamstring injury he suffered while with the Storm. Ismail returned to the Storm afterwards and finished the 1994 season with them. Overall, he played in nine games for the Storm that year, recording eight solo tackles, two assisted tackles, and one fumble recovery. He was an offensive lineman/defensive lineman during his time in the AFL as the league played under ironman rules. In November 1994, Ismail, Tony Chickillo, and Travis Pearson were traded to the Miami Hooters for Cedric McKinnon.

Ismail played for the Scottish Claymores of the World League of American Football in 1995 and was listed as an offensive guard.
