= 1995 Milwaukee Mustangs season =

Arena Football League team season

- Head coach: Michael Trigg
- Home stadium: Bradley Center

Results
- Record: 4–8
- Division place: 4th, Central
- Playoffs: Did not make playoffs

The 1995 Milwaukee Mustangs season was the second season for the Milwaukee Mustangs. They finished the 1995 Arena Football League season 4–8 and were one of two teams in the American Conference to miss the playoffs.

== Schedule ==
=== Regular season ===
Week	Date	Opponent	Results		Game site (attendance)
Week	Date	Opponent	Final score	Team record	Game site (attendance)
1	May 12	Iowa Barnstormers	L 61–69	0–1	Bradley Center (12,297)
2	May 19	at Memphis Pharaohs	L 26–33	0–2	Pyramid Arena (8,887)
3	May 26	St. Louis Stampede	L 65–67	0–3	Bradley Center (12,474)
4	June 2	at Charlotte Rage	W 31–27	1–3	Independence Arena (8,166)
5	June 9	at St. Louis Stampede	L 45–53	1–4	Kiel Center (10,809)
6	June 16	San Jose SaberCats	W 64–47	2–4	Bradley Center (14,747)
7	June 23	at Orlando Predators	L 33–58	2–5	Orlando Arena (15,638)
8	June 30	at Las Vegas Sting	L 35–45	2–6	Thomas & Mack Center (5,483)
9	July 7	Arizona Rattlers	W 66–53	3–6	Bradley Center (13,714)
10	July 15	at Iowa Barnstormers	L 35–74	3–7	Veterans Memorial Auditorium (11,411)
11	Bye				
12	July 28	Memphis Pharaohs	W 53–37	4–7	Bradley Center (15,471)
13	August 4	Tampa Bay Storm	L 27–56	4–8	Bradley Center (16,147)

== Standings ==
Team	Overall			Division		
Team	Wins	Losses	Percentage	Wins	Losses	Percentage
National Conference
Eastern Division
Albany Firebirds	7	5	0.583	3	1	0.750
Charlotte Rage	5	7	0.417	3	1	0.750
Connecticut Coyotes	1	11	0.083	0	4	0.000
Southern Division
Tampa Bay Storm	10	2	0.833	4	0	1.000
Orlando Predators	7	5	0.583	2	2	0.500
Miami Hooters	1	11	0.083	0	4	0.000
American Conference
Central Division
St. Louis Stampede	9	3	0.750	4	2	0.667
Iowa Barnstormers	7	5	0.583	4	2	0.667
Memphis Pharaohs	6	6	0.500	3	3	0.500
Milwaukee Mustangs	4	8	0.333	1	5	0.167
Western Division
San Jose SaberCats	8	4	0.667	2	2	0.500
Arizona Rattlers	7	5	0.583	3	1	0.750
Las Vegas Sting	6	6	0.500	1	3	0.250

- Green indicates clinched playoff berth
- Blue indicates division champion
- Grey indicates best regular season record

== Awards ==
Position	Player	Award	All-Arena team
Offensive/defensive lineman	Ralph Jarvis	-	1st
