= 1995 Iowa Barnstormers season =

AFL football league season

- Head coach: John Gregory
- Home stadium: Veterans Memorial Auditorium

Results
- Record: 7–5
- Division place: 2nd, Central
- Playoffs: W Quarterfinals vs. Arizona; L Semifinals vs. Orlando

The 1995 Iowa Barnstormers season was the first season for the Iowa Barnstormers. They finished the 1995 Arena Football League season 7–5 and ended the season with a loss in the semifinals of the playoffs against the Orlando Predators.

== Schedule ==
=== Regular season ===
Week	Date	Opponent	Results		Game site (attendance)
Week	Date	Opponent	Final score	Team record	Game site (attendance)
1	May 12	at Milwaukee Mustangs	W 69–61	1–0	Bradley Center (12,297)
2	May 20	Miami Hooters	W 41–29	2–0	Veterans Memorial Auditorium (10,628)
3	May 25	at Connecticut Coyotes	W 51–18	3–0	Hartford Civic Center (7,340)
4	June 3	St. Louis Stampede	L 38–44	3–1	Veterans Memorial Auditorium (11,081)
5	June 10	at Arizona Rattlers	W 62–54	4–1	America West Arena (15,505)
6	June 16	Memphis Pharaohs	L 54–57 (OT)	4–2	Veterans Memorial Auditorium (10,187)
7	June 24	San Jose SaberCats	L 17–33	4–3	Veterans Memorial Auditorium (11,411)
8	June 30	at St. Louis Stampede	W 52–35	5–3	Kiel Center (12,270)
9	Bye				
10	July 15	Milwaukee Mustangs	W 74–35	6–3	Veterans Memorial Auditorium (11,411)
11	July 21	Las Vegas Sting	L 34–40	6–4	Veterans Memorial Auditorium (11,411)
12	July 29	at Albany Firebirds	L 56–73	6–5	Knickerbocker Arena (12,603)
13	August 5	at Memphis Pharaohs	W 45–32	7–5	Pyramid Arena (12,621)

=== Playoffs ===
The Barnstormers were awarded the No. 5 seed in the AFL playoffs.

Round	Date	Opponent	Results		Game site (attendance)
Round	Date	Opponent	Final score	Playoff record	Game site (attendance)
Quarterfinals	August 13	at (4) Arizona Rattlers	W 56–52	1–0	America West Arena (14,761)
Semifinals	August 19	(6) Orlando Predators	L 49–56	1–1	Veterans Memorial Auditorium (11,411)

== Standings ==
Team	Overall			Division		
Team	Wins	Losses	Percentage	Wins	Losses	Percentage
National Conference
Eastern Division
Albany Firebirds	7	5	0.583	3	1	0.750
Charlotte Rage	5	7	0.417	3	1	0.750
Connecticut Coyotes	1	11	0.083	0	4	0.000
Southern Division
Tampa Bay Storm	10	2	0.833	4	0	1.000
Orlando Predators	7	5	0.583	2	2	0.500
Miami Hooters	1	11	0.083	0	4	0.000
American Conference
Central Division
St. Louis Stampede	9	3	0.750	4	2	0.667
Iowa Barnstormers	7	5	0.583	4	2	0.667
Memphis Pharaohs	6	6	0.500	3	3	0.500
Milwaukee Mustangs	4	8	0.333	1	5	0.167
Western Division
San Jose SaberCats	8	4	0.667	2	2	0.500
Arizona Rattlers	7	5	0.583	3	1	0.750
Las Vegas Sting	6	6	0.500	1	3	0.250

- Green indicates clinched playoff berth
- Blue indicates division champion
- Grey indicates best regular season record

== Awards ==
Position	Player	Award	All-Arena team
Kicker	Mike Black	-	1st
Head coach	John Gregory	Head coach of the Year	-
Owner	Jim Foster	Executive of the Year	-
