= Rick Buffington =

American football player (born 1945)

Profile
- Positions: Defensive back, kick returner

Personal information
- Born: April 16, 1945 (age 81); Fall River, Massachusetts, U.S.
- Listed height: 5 ft 10 in (1.78 m)
- Listed weight: 170 lb (77 kg)

Career information
- High school: Durfee (MA)
- College: BYU

Career history

Playing
- Rhode Island Steelers (1966); Bridgeport Jets (?); Quincy Giants (1969); Note: 14–16 other teams are not listed (Note: Buffington's biography at the Patriots Alumni website states he played for 19 minor league teams, although it only lists the above three. The leagues Buffington played in are listed as the Eastern Football League, New England Football League, Boston Park League, and Atlantic Coast Football League. Several newspaper articles in the 1990s state he played for 17 teams.)

Coaching
- Bristol Community College (1968–?) Head coach; North-Tri Attleboro Kings (1973–1976) Head coach; New York Jets (1977) Assistant coach; New England Patriots (1978–1981) Assistant coach (1978) Assistant linebackers coach/assistant defensive backs coach/defensive assistant (1979–1981); New Jersey Generals (1983) Special teams coach/linebackers coach; New England Steamrollers (1988) Defensive coordinator; Denver Dynamite (1989) Defensive coordinator; Albany Firebirds (1990–1993) Head coach; Las Vegas Sting (1994) Defensive coordinator; Connecticut Coyotes (1995) Head coach; Charlotte Rage (1996) Head coach; Florida Bobcats (1997–1998) Assistant coach (1997) Head coach (1998); Milwaukee Mustangs (1999) Assistant coach; Florida Bobcats (2000) Interim head coach; New Haven Ninjas (2002) Head coach; Albany Conquest (2004) Head coach; New England Surge (2007) Head coach; Boston Blaze (2017) Head coach

Operations
- North-Tri Attleboro Kings (1973–1976) General manager/owner; New York Jets (1976) Part-time scout; New England Patriots (1978–1980) Scout (1978) Administrative aide (1979) Administrative assistant (1979–1980); New Jersey Generals (1983) Scout; Pittsburgh Maulers (1983–1984) Director of college scouting/director of pro scouting; New England Steamrollers (1988) Head scout; Connecticut Coyotes (1995) Director of player personnel; Connecticut Coyotes (1995) General manager; Charlotte Rage (1996) Director of football operations; Florida Bobcats (2000) General manager

Awards and highlights
- Minor Pro Football Hall of Fame (1987)

Head coaching record
- Regular season: 28–53 (.346) (AFL)
- Postseason: 0–3 (.000) (AFL)
- Career: 28–56 (.333) (AFL)

Richard B. Buffington (born April 16, 1945) is an American former football player and coach. After briefly playing college football at BYU, he played for 17–19 different minor league teams in several leagues. He became a coach afterwards, beginning in 1968 with Bristol Community College. Buffington was a scout and assistant coach in the National Football League (NFL) in the late 1970s, and was an administrator and coach in the United States Football League (USFL) from 1982 to 1984. From 1988 to 2000, Buffington was a coach for several teams in the Arena Football League (AFL), including serving as head coach for the Albany Firebirds (1990–1993), Connecticut Coyotes (1995), Charlotte Rage (1996), and Florida Bobcats (1998, 2000). He also coached the New Haven Ninjas (2002) and Albany Conquest (2004) in af2, the New England Surge (2007) in the Continental Indoor Football League (CIFL), and the Boston Blaze (2017) in the Can-Am Indoor Football League.

== Early life and playing career ==
Buffington was born on April 16, 1945, in Fall River, Massachusetts. At five years old, he was run over by a car, resulting in two broken legs. When they healed, Buffington "found that his legs were very strong, and that catapulted him to run continuously, and run every day and everywhere." At 15 years old, he enrolled at Durfee High School, where he played football. After graduating from there, Buffington played one season of freshman football at Brigham Young University in 1963. He was drafted to serve in the United States Navy shortly afterwards.

Buffington later returned to BYU, and after graduating from there, began a career in minor league football. He played for a total of at least 17 teams, with some sources listing as many as 19, including three at once. "[The three teams] were all in different leagues, and all three of them didn't have insurance," he later said. "I didn't care ... I just wanted to play, wanted to play, wanted to play and wanted to play." Leagues Buffington played in include the Atlantic Coast Football League (ACFL), Eastern Football League (EFL), Boston Park League (BPL), and New England Football League (NEFL). In the ACFL, he played for the Rhode Island Steelers (1966), Bridgeport Jets (?), and Quincy Giants (1969). Buffington mainly played defensive back and kick returner. He was inducted into the Minor Pro Football Hall of Fame as a player in 1987.

== Coaching career ==
Buffington began his coaching career in 1968, as head coach of the Bristol Community College football team in Fall River, Massachusetts. He founded the North-Tri Attleboro Kings of the Eastern Football League in 1973 and served as their head coach, general manager, and owner through 1976. He was hired as a part-time scout with the New York Jets in the National Football League in 1976 by Mike Holovak, (Note: The Hartford Courant in 1994 stated that he had joined in 1975.) and became Holovak's assistant when the latter was named interim head coach the following season.

Buffington followed Holovak to the New England Patriots in 1978, being hired as a scout by Bucko Kilroy. He was promoted to the coaching staff later in the season, and was named coaches' administrative aide/administrative assistant the following year. He also did film work as a defensive assistant and was assistant linebackers coach as well as assistant defensive backs coach from 1979 to 1981, before being fired in December 1981.

Buffington was hired by the New Jersey Generals of the new United States Football League (USFL) at the end of 1982, to serve as special teams and linebackers coach as well as a scout during the 1983 season. He was so optimistic about the league that he declined an offer to become a defensive coach of the New York Giants. After the 1983 season ended, Buffington accepted a position as director of college and pro scouting with the Pittsburgh Maulers, but resigned in January 1984 before the regular season began. A spokesperson said he resigned to "pursue other opportunities in professional football." In 1986, Buffington attempted to bring a professional football team to Boston through the America's Football Team Inc.

Buffington was hired by Babe Parilli as defensive coordinator and head scout of the New England Steamrollers, of the newly formed Arena Football League (AFL), in 1988. He followed Parilli to the Denver Dynamite in 1989, staying as defensive coordinator.

Buffington received his first professional head coaching position in 1990 with the Albany Firebirds, an expansion franchise. In his first season with the team, the Firebirds compiled a 3–5 record but missed the playoffs. He coached them to a playoff berth in 1991, where they lost 35–37 in the semifinals to the Detroit Drive. Buffington was re-signed through the 1992 season in August 1991. He brought them to the playoffs again in 1992 with a record of 5–5, but the Firebirds lost 45–48 in round one of the playoffs to the Dallas Texans. He was re-signed for the 1993 season in October 1992.

In the 1993 season, the Firebirds compiled a 5–7 record, but still managed to secure a playoff spot, where they lost 45–48 to the eventual ArenaBowl champion Tampa Bay Storm. He was fired after the season and was replaced by Mike Hohensee. Buffington finished his time at Albany with a 19–21 regular season record, and a 19–24 overall record, having lost all three playoff games in which he coached.

Buffington was hired by the Las Vegas Sting as defensive coordinator in 1994, reuniting him with Babe Parilli. In one season with the team, Buffington helped Las Vegas record the lowest allowed yards per game average (220.5), lowest passing yards per game average (195.9), and third lowest points allowed (487). Las Vegas made it to the playoffs, where they lost to Buffington's former team, the Albany Firebirds.

Buffington was among the candidates for the Tampa Bay Storm coaching job for the 1995 season. Instead, he received the head coach, director of player personnel and general manager job with the Connecticut Coyotes. The 1995 Connecticut Coyotes compiled a record of 1–11 with Buffington as coach, finishing tied for the worst record in the league.

In 1996, Buffington was named head coach and director of football operations of the Charlotte Rage. He faced off against his former team, the Connecticut Coyotes, twice, and won each time (the first time by a score of 49–31, the second, 51–31). However, the Rage only won five games in the season, finishing 5–9 and out of the playoffs. He did not return to the team for a second season.

Buffington was reunited with Babe Parilli in 1997, being hired as an assistant with the Florida Bobcats. He was named head coach for the 1998 season, and compiled a record of 3–11. The following season, he served as an assistant coach with the Milwaukee Mustangs. He returned to the Bobcats in 2000 as general manager, and served as the interim head coach for one game, which they lost. It was his final game coaching in the Arena Football League, as he finished with an overall record of 28–53 (28–56 including playoffs).

In 2002, after spending a year out of coaching, Buffington was hired as head coach of the af2 New Haven Ninjas, leading them to a 6–10 record. Two years later, he served as the coach of the Albany Conquest, helping them compile a 6–10 record. In 2007, he was hired as head coach of the New England Surge of the Continental Indoor Football League (CIFL) on a three-year contract, but was fired mid-season after the team lost three of their first four games. He returned to coaching for a final time in 2017 with the Boston Blaze of the Can-Am Indoor Football League.

== Personal life ==
Buffington worked with comedian Jimmy Durante as part of a summer job in 1964. In 2007, he joined the New England Patriots Alumni Club. Since retiring from coaching, he has participated at speaking events, youth clinics, and charitable functions. An arena football-based video game was developed using his material by EA Sports.
