= Howfield =

Howfield is an English surname. Notable people with the surname include:

- Bobby Howfield (born 1936), English footballer and American football player
- Ian Howfield (born 1966), American football player, son of Bobby
