= Tony Chickillo =

American football player (born 1960)

No. 91, 75
- Positions: Nose tackle, defensive end, guard

Personal information
- Born: July 8, 1960 (age 66); Miami, Florida, U.S.
- Listed height: 6 ft 3 in (1.91 m)
- Listed weight: 262 lb (119 kg)

Career information
- High school: Southwest (Miami)
- College: Miami (FL) (1979–1982)
- NFL draft: 1983: 5th round, 131st overall pick

Career history
- Tampa Bay Buccaneers (1983); Indianapolis Colts (1984)*; San Diego Chargers (1984–1985); Miami Dolphins (1986)*; New York Jets (1987); Tampa Bay Storm (1993–1994); Miami Hooters (1995); Tampa Bay Storm (1996); New Jersey Gladiators (2001)
- * Offseason or practice squad member only

Awards and highlights
- ArenaBowl champion (1993); First-team All-South Independent (1982)

Career NFL statistics
- Games played: 7
- Games started: 2
- Stats at Pro Football Reference
- Stats at ArenaFan.com

Anthony Paul Chickillo (born July 8, 1960) is an American former professional football player who was a defensive lineman for three seasons in the National Football League (NFL) with the San Diego Chargers and New York Jets. He was selected by the Tampa Bay Buccaneers in the fifth round of the 1983 NFL draft after playing college football for the Miami Hurricanes. Chickillo also played in the Arena Football League (AFL).

== Early life and college ==
Anthony Paul Chickillo was born on July 8, 1960, in Miami, Florida. He attended Southwest Miami High School in Miami.

Chickillo was a four-year letterman for the Hurricanes of the University of Miami from 1979 to 1982. He earned Associated Press first-team All-South Independent honors his senior year in 1982.

== Professional career ==
Chickillo was selected by the Tampa Bay Buccaneers in the fifth round, with the 131st overall pick, of the 1983 NFL draft. He officially signed with the team on June 6. He was placed on injured reserve on August 22, 1983, and spent the entire season there. Chickillo was waived by the Buccaneers on August 20, 1984.

Chickillo was claimed off waivers by the Indianapolis Colts on August 21, 1984. He was released on August 27, 1984.

Chickillo signed with the San Diego Chargers on December 13, 1984. He played in one game for the Chargers during the 1984 season. He appeared in four games, starting one, in 1985 before being released on October 5, 1985.

Chickillo signed with the Miami Dolphins on April 30, 1986. He was later released on August 21, 1986.

Chickillo was signed by the New York Jets on March 27, 1987. He was released on May 20, 1987, after failing a physical. On September 24, 1987, Chickillo signed with the Jets during the 1987 NFL players strike. He played in two games, starting one, during the 1987 season before being released on October 19, 1987, after the strike ended. He signed with the Jets again on April 15, 1988, but was released on August 8, 1988.

Chickillo played in eight games for the Tampa Bay Storm of the Arena Football League (AFL) in 1993, recording 11 solo tackles, three assisted tackles, one sack, and one fumble recovery. He was an offensive lineman/defensive lineman during his time in the AFL as the league played under ironman rules. On August 21, 1993, the Storm won ArenaBowl VII against the Detroit Drive by a score of 51–31. Chickillo appeared in all 12 games for the Storm during the 1994 season, totaling 19 solo tackles, seven assisted tackles, two sacks, four fumble recoveries, two pass breakups, and one blocked kick. Tampa Bay finished the year with a 7–5 record and lost in the first round of the playoffs to the Massachusetts Marauders 58–51.

In November 1994, Chickillo, Hesham Ismail, and Travis Pearson were traded to the Miami Hooters for Cedric McKinnon. Chickillo played in four games for the Hooters during the 1995 season, recording three solo tackles, three assisted tackles, two fumble recoveries, and two pass breakups. He was suspended on June 16, 1995, for an unknown reason.

Chickillo signed with the Storm again on April 19, 1996. He was waived on May 10, 1996, before appearing in any games.

Chickillo returned to the AFL in 2001 at the age of 40, signing with the New Jersey Gladiators on March 8, 2001. He was suspended on April 4 and activated on May 14. He played in one game for the Gladiators during the 2001 season, posting one solo tackle. Chickillo was waived on May 30, 2001.

== Personal life ==
Chickillo is the son of NFL player Nick Chickillo and the father of NFL linebacker Anthony Chickillo. Tony also spent time as a high school football coach.
