= 1995 St. Louis Stampede season =

Arena Football League team season

- Head coach: Earle Bruce
- Home stadium: Kiel Center

Results
- Record: 9–3
- Division place: 1st, Central
- Playoffs: L Quarterfinals vs. Albany

The 1995 St. Louis Stampede season was the first of two seasons for the St. Louis Stampede. They finished the 1995 Arena Football League season 9–3 and ended the season with a loss in the quarterfinals of the playoffs against the Albany Firebirds.

== Schedule ==
=== Regular season ===
Week	Date	Opponent	Results		Game site (attendance)
Week	Date	Opponent	Final score	Team record	Game site (attendance)
1	May 12	Memphis Pharaohs	W 35–22	1–0	Kiel Center (10,675)
2	May 20	Connecticut Coyotes	W 42–40	2–0	Kiel Center (8,774)
3	May 26	at Milwaukee Mustangs	W 67–65	3–0	Bradley Center (12,474)
4	June 3	at Iowa Barnstormers	W 44–38	4–0	Veterans Memorial Auditorium (11,081)
5	June 9	Milwaukee Mustangs	W 53–45	5–0	Kiel Center (10,809)
6	June 17	at Las Vegas Sting	L 25–57	5–1	Thomas & Mack Center (6,144)
7	Bye				
8	June 30	Iowa Barnstormers	L 35–52	5–2	Kiel Center (12,270)
9	July 8	at Memphis Pharaohs	L 33–55	5–3	Pyramid Arena (11,481)
10	July 15	at Arizona Rattlers	W 56–46	6–3	America West Arena (15,505)
11	July 21	Charlotte Rage	W 34–26	7–3	Kiel Center (10,881)
12	July 28	at Miami Hooters	W 43–38	8–3	Miami Arena (8,406)
13	August 5	Albany Firebirds	W 52–49	9–3	Kiel Center (11,808)

=== Playoffs ===
The Predators were awarded the No. 2 seed in the AFL playoffs.

Round	Date	Opponent	Results		Game site (attendance)
Round	Date	Opponent	Final score	Playoff record	Game site (attendance)
Quarterfinals	August 11	(7) Albany Firebirds	L 49–51	0–1	Kiel Center (9,082)

== Standings ==
Team	Overall			Division		
Team	Wins	Losses	Percentage	Wins	Losses	Percentage
National Conference
Eastern Division
Albany Firebirds	7	5	0.583	3	1	0.750
Charlotte Rage	5	7	0.417	3	1	0.750
Connecticut Coyotes	1	11	0.083	0	4	0.000
Southern Division
Tampa Bay Storm	10	2	0.833	4	0	1.000
Orlando Predators	7	5	0.583	2	2	0.500
Miami Hooters	1	11	0.083	0	4	0.000
American Conference
Central Division
St. Louis Stampede	9	3	0.750	4	2	0.667
Iowa Barnstormers	7	5	0.583	4	2	0.667
Memphis Pharaohs	6	6	0.500	3	3	0.500
Milwaukee Mustangs	4	8	0.333	1	5	0.167
Western Division
San Jose SaberCats	8	4	0.667	2	2	0.500
Arizona Rattlers	7	5	0.583	3	1	0.750
Las Vegas Sting	6	6	0.500	1	3	0.250

- Green indicates clinched playoff berth
- Blue indicates division champion
- Grey indicates best regular season record

== Awards ==
Position	Player	Award	All-Arena team
Wide receiver/linebacker	Darryl Hammond		1st
