= 1995 Charlotte Rage season =

Arena Football League team season

- Head coach: Doug Kay
- Home stadium: Independence Arena

Results
- Record: 5–7
- Division place: 2nd, Eastern
- Playoffs: Did not make playoffs

The 1995 Charlotte Rage season was the fourth season for the Charlotte Rage. They finished the 1995 Arena Football League season 5–7 and were one of three teams in the National Conference to miss the playoffs.

== Regular season ==
=== Schedule ===
Week	Date	Opponent	Results		Game site (attendance)
Week	Date	Opponent	Final score	Team record	Game site (attendance)
1	May 13	at Albany Firebirds	W 51–49	1–0	Knickerbocker Arena (12,965)
2	May 19	Orlando Predators	W 41–38	2–0	Independence Arena (6,665)
3	May 27	at Tampa Bay Storm	L 16–34	2–1	ThunderDome (12,426)
4	June 2	Milwaukee Mustangs	L 27–31	2–2	Independence Arena (8,166)
5	June 9	at Connecticut Coyotes	W 33–22	3–2	Hartford Civic Center (7,059)
6	June 16	Connecticut Coyotes	W 53–24	4–2	Independence Arena (7,988)
7	June 24	at Arizona Rattlers	W 52–50	5–2	America West Arena (15,505)
8	June 30	Albany Firebirds	L 49–69	5–3	Independence Arena (8,942)
9	July 7	San Jose SaberCats	L 35–66	5–4	Independence Arena (9,164)
10	July 14	at San Jose SaberCats	L 20–52	5–5	San Jose Arena (13,612)
11	July 21	at St. Louis Stampede	L 26–34	5–6	Kiel Center (10,881)
12	Bye				
13	August 4	Las Vegas Sting	L 43–50	5–7	Independence Arena (7,746)

== Standings ==
Team	Overall			Division		
Team	Wins	Losses	Percentage	Wins	Losses	Percentage
National Conference
Eastern Division
Albany Firebirds	7	5	0.583	3	1	0.750
Charlotte Rage	5	7	0.417	3	1	0.750
Connecticut Coyotes	1	11	0.083	0	4	0.000
Southern Division
Tampa Bay Storm	10	2	0.833	4	0	1.000
Orlando Predators	7	5	0.583	2	2	0.500
Miami Hooters	1	11	0.083	0	4	0.000
American Conference
Central Division
St. Louis Stampede	9	3	0.750	4	2	0.667
Iowa Barnstormers	7	5	0.583	4	2	0.667
Memphis Pharaohs	6	6	0.500	3	3	0.500
Milwaukee Mustangs	4	8	0.333	1	5	0.167
Western Division
San Jose SaberCats	8	4	0.667	2	2	0.500
Arizona Rattlers	7	5	0.583	3	1	0.750
Las Vegas Sting	6	6	0.500	1	3	0.250

- Green indicates clinched playoff berth
- Blue indicates division champion
- Grey indicates best regular season record

== Awards ==
Position	Player	Award	All-Arena team
Offensive/defensive lineman	Robert Stewart	-	2nd
