= 1995 Connecticut Coyotes season =

Arena Football League team season

- Head coach: Rick Buffington
- Home stadium: Hartford Civic Center

Results
- Record: 1–11
- Division place: 3rd, Eastern
- Playoffs: Did not make playoffs

The 1995 Connecticut Coyotes season was the first of two seasons for the Connecticut Coyotes. They finished the 1995 Arena Football League season 1–11 and were one of three teams in the National Conference to miss the playoffs.

== Regular season ==
=== Schedule ===
Week	Date	Opponent	Results		Game site (attendance)
Week	Date	Opponent	Final score	Team record	Game site (attendance)
1	May 13	Orlando Predators	L 43–45	0–1	Hartford Civic Center (7,643)
2	May 20	at St. Louis Stampede	L 40–42	0–2	Kiel Center (8,774)
3	May 25	Iowa Barnstormers	L 18–51	0–3	Harford Civic Center (7,340)
4	June 3	at Albany Firebirds	L 34–57	0–4	Knickerbocker Arena (11,994)
5	June 9	Charlotte Rage	L 22–33	0–5	Hartford Civic Center (7,059)
6	June 16	at Charlotte Rage	L 24–53	0–6	Independence Arena (7,988)
7	June 23	Albany Firebirds	L 31–63	0–7	Hartford Civic Center (7,831)
8	July 1	at Miami Hooters	W 60–39	1–7	Miami Arena (4,500)
9	July 8	Tampa Bay Storm	L 32–38	1–8	Hartford Civic Center (7,521)
10	Bye				
11	July 21	at Tampa Bay Storm	L 32–60	1–9	ThunderDome (12,825)
12	July 29	San Jose SaberCats	L 44–48	1–10	Hartford Civic Center (9,724)
13	August 4	at Orlando Predators	L 29–62	1–11	Orlando Arena (15,638)

== Standings ==
Team	Overall			Division		
Team	Wins	Losses	Percentage	Wins	Losses	Percentage
National Conference
Eastern Division
Albany Firebirds	7	5	0.583	3	1	0.750
Charlotte Rage	5	7	0.417	3	1	0.750
Connecticut Coyotes	1	11	0.083	0	4	0.000
Southern Division
Tampa Bay Storm	10	2	0.833	4	0	1.000
Orlando Predators	7	5	0.583	2	2	0.500
Miami Hooters	1	11	0.083	0	4	0.000
American Conference
Central Division
St. Louis Stampede	9	3	0.750	4	2	0.667
Iowa Barnstormers	7	5	0.583	4	2	0.667
Memphis Pharaohs	6	6	0.500	3	3	0.500
Milwaukee Mustangs	4	8	0.333	1	5	0.167
Western Division
San Jose SaberCats	8	4	0.667	2	2	0.500
Arizona Rattlers	7	5	0.583	3	1	0.750
Las Vegas Sting	6	6	0.500	1	3	0.250

- Green indicates clinched playoff berth
- Blue indicates division champion
- Grey indicates best regular season record

== Awards ==
Position	Player	Award	All-Arena team
Fullback/linebacker	Les Barley	-	1st
