= Cedric McKinnon =

American football player (1968–2016)

No. 42
- Positions: Fullback, linebacker

Personal information
- Born: February 2, 1968
- Died: May 24, 2016 (aged 48)
- Listed height: 6 ft 3 in (1.91 m)
- Listed weight: 240 lb (109 kg)

Career information
- High school: Coral Gables (Coral Gables, Florida)
- College: Bethune-Cookman (1987–1990)
- NFL draft: 1991: undrafted

Career history
- BC Lions (1991)*; Cleveland Thunderbolts (1992–1994); Miami Hooters (1995)*; Tampa Bay Storm (1995–2000)
- * Offseason or practice squad member only

Awards and highlights
- 2× ArenaBowl champion (1995–1996); Second-team All-Arena (1995)

Career AFL statistics
- Rushes: 216
- Rushing yards: 799
- Rushing TDs: 34
- Tackles: 101.5
- Sacks: 16
- Stats at ArenaFan.com

Cedric McKinnon (February 2, 1968 – May 24, 2016) was an American professional football player who played eight seasons in the Arena Football League (AFL) with the Cleveland Thunderbolts and Tampa Bay Storm. He played college football at Bethune–Cookman College.

== Early life and college ==
Cedric McKinnon was born on February 2, 1968. He attended Coral Gables Senior High School in Coral Gables, Florida.

McKinnon was a four-year letterman for the Bethune–Cookman Wildcats of Bethune–Cookman College from 1987 to 1990. The 1988 Wildcats were Mid-Eastern Athletic Conference (MEAC) co-champions. McKinnon was a Sporting News preseason All-American his senior year in 1990. He finished the year with a single-season school-record 140 tackles, earning All-MEAC honors.

== Professional career ==
McKinnon went undrafted in the 1991 NFL draft. On June 11, 1911, it was reported that he had signed with the BC Lions of the Canadian Football League (CFL). However, he was released in early July before the start of the 1991 CFL season.

McKinnon played in nine games for the Cleveland Thunderbolts of the Arena Football League (AFL) in 1992, totaling 27 carries for 120 yards and six touchdowns, six catches for 36 yards and one touchdown, 31 solo tackles, four assisted tackles, four sacks, one forced fumble, one fumble recovery, four pass breakups, and three blocked kicks. The Thunderbolts finished the season with a 4–6 record and lost in the first round of the playoffs to the Orlando Predators. McKinnon was a fullback/linebacker during his time in the AFL as the league played under ironman rules. He appeared in seven games for the Thunderbolts in 1993, rushing 30 times for 117 yards and one touchdown on offense while recording 20 solo tackles, four assisted tackles, three sacks, one fumble recovery, and two pass breakups on defense. He played in five games during the 1994 season, accumulating 28 rushing attempts for 101 yards and two touchdowns, four receptions for 14 yards and one touchdown, six solo tackles, four assisted tackles, and two sacks.

In November 1994, the Miami Hooters traded McKinnon to the Tampa Bay Storm for Hesham Ismail, Tony Chickillo, and Travis Pearson. McKinnon appeared in eight games for the Storm of the AFL in 1995, accumulating 53 carries for 222 yards and 13 touchdowns, three catches for 15 yards, 11 solo tackles, one assisted tackle, one fumble recovery, four pass breakups, and one blocked kick. His 222 rushing yards were the most in the AFL that year. He was named second-team All-Arena for his performance during the 1995 season. The Storm finished the season with a 10–2 record and eventually advanced to ArenaBowl IX, where they beat the Predators by a score of 48–35. McKinnon played in nine games in 1996, totaling 49 rushing attempts for 166 yards and eight touchdowns, two receptions for 26 yards and one touchdown, ten solo tackles, four assisted tackles, three sacks, one fumble recovery, and two pass breakups. The Storm finished the 1996 season with a 12–2 record and advanced to the ArenaBowl for the second consecutive season, this time beating the Iowa Barnstormers in ArenaBowl X by a score of 42–38. He only played in four games in 1997, missing time due to injury. He rushed ten times for 21 yards and one touchdown while also posting six solo tackles and two assisted tackles that season. He only appeared in three games in 1998 before he was suspended by the AFL for a year in July 1998 for violating the league's drug policy. He did not play any in 1999. McKinnon returned to the Storm in 2000. He played in seven games during the 2000 season, totaling 16 carries for 54 yards and three touchdowns, two catches for 21 yards, three solo tackles, three assisted tackles, three sacks, and one forced fumble. He was the AFL's third all-time leading rusher at the end of his final season.

== Personal life ==
McKinnon's day job while in the AFL was a hitch mechanic for U-Haul. He died on May 24, 2016.
