= Jeff Parker (American football) =

American football player (born 1969)

No. 83
- Position: Wide receiver

Personal information
- Born: July 18, 1969 (age 57); Daytona Beach, Florida, U.S.
- Listed height: 5 ft 10 in (1.78 m)
- Listed weight: 185 lb (84 kg)

Career information
- High school: Seabreeze (Daytona Beach)
- College: Bethune-Cookman
- NFL draft: 1992: undrafted

Career history
- Tampa Bay Buccaneers (1992); Charlotte Rage (1994); Rhein Fire (1995); Orlando Predators (1995–1998)

Awards and highlights
- ArenaBowl champion (1998)
- Stats at Pro Football Reference

Jeffrey Parker (born July 16, 1969) is an American former professional football player who was a wide receiver who played for the Tampa Bay Buccaneers of the National Football League (NFL). He played college football for the Bethune-Cookman Wildcats.
