= 1995 Arizona Rattlers season =

Arena Football League team season

- Head coach: Danny White
- Home stadium: America West Arena

Results
- Record: 7–5
- Division place: 2nd, Western
- Playoffs: L Quarterfinals vs. Iowa

The 1995 Arizona Rattlers season was the fourth season for the Arizona Rattlers. They finished the 1995 Arena Football League season 7–5 and ended the season with a loss in the quarterfinals of the playoffs against the Iowa Barnstormers.

== Schedule ==
=== Regular season ===
Week	Date	Opponent	Results		Game site (attendance)
Week	Date	Opponent	Final score	Team record	Game site (attendance)
1	May 12	at San Jose SaberCats	W 43–37 (OT)	1–0	San Jose Arena (15,105)
2	May 19	Albany Firebirds	W 45–35	2–0	America West Arena (15,121)
3	May 27	Las Vegas Sting	W 72–69	3–0	America West Arena (15,435)
4	June 2	at Memphis Pharaohs	W 48–33	4–0	Pyramid Arena (8,205)
5	June 10	Iowa Barnstormers	L 54–62	4–1	America West Arena (15,505)
6	Bye				
7	June 24	Charlotte Rage	L 50–52	4–2	America West Arena (15,505)
8	July 1	at Orlando Predators	W 49–48	5–2	Orlando Arena (15,638)
9	July 7	at Milwaukee Mustangs	L 53–66	5–3	Bradley Center (13,714)
10	July 15	St. Louis Stampede	L 46–56	5–4	America West Arena (15,505)
11	July 22	Miami Hooters	W 52–29	6–4	America West Arena (14,431)
12	July 29	at Las Vegas Sting	L 46–60	6–5	Thomas & Mack Center (5,621)
13	August 6	at San Jose SaberCats	W 41–40	7–5	San Jose Arena (15,569)

=== Playoffs ===
The Rattlers were awarded the No. 4 seed in the AFL playoffs.

Round	Date	Opponent	Results		Game site (attendance)
Round	Date	Opponent	Final score	Playoff record	Game site (attendance)
Quarterfinals	August 13	(5) Iowa Barnstormers	L 52–56	0–1	America West Arena (14,761)

== Standings ==
Team	Overall			Division		
Team	Wins	Losses	Percentage	Wins	Losses	Percentage
National Conference
Eastern Division
Albany Firebirds	7	5	0.583	3	1	0.750
Charlotte Rage	5	7	0.417	3	1	0.750
Connecticut Coyotes	1	11	0.083	0	4	0.000
Southern Division
Tampa Bay Storm	10	2	0.833	4	0	1.000
Orlando Predators	7	5	0.583	2	2	0.500
Miami Hooters	1	11	0.083	0	4	0.000
American Conference
Central Division
St. Louis Stampede	9	3	0.750	4	2	0.667
Iowa Barnstormers	7	5	0.583	4	2	0.667
Memphis Pharaohs	6	6	0.500	3	3	0.500
Milwaukee Mustangs	4	8	0.333	1	5	0.167
Western Division
San Jose SaberCats	8	4	0.667	2	2	0.500
Arizona Rattlers	7	5	0.583	3	1	0.750
Las Vegas Sting	6	6	0.500	1	3	0.250

- Green indicates clinched playoff berth
- Blue indicates division champion
- Grey indicates best regular season record

== Awards ==
Position	Player	Award	All-Arena team
Offensive specialist	Hunkie Cooper	-	1st
