= Corey Dowden =

American football player (born 1968)

No. 42, 36, 20
- Position: Defensive back

Personal information
- Born: October 18, 1968 (age 58); New Orleans, Louisiana, U.S.
- Listed height: 5 ft 11 in (1.80 m)
- Listed weight: 190 lb (86 kg)

Career information
- High school: John McDonogh (New Orleans)
- College: Tulane
- NFL draft: 1991: undrafted

Career history
- Tampa Bay Storm (1992–1993); Ottawa Roughriders (1994); Tampa Bay Storm (1995); New Orleans Saints (1996)*; Green Bay Packers (1996); Baltimore Ravens (1996); San Francisco 49ers (1997)*; Chicago Bears (1997); Tampa Bay Storm (1998); Cleveland Browns (1999)*; Tampa Bay Storm (1999); New Jersey Gladiators (2001)
- * Offseason or practice squad member only

Awards and highlights
- 2× ArenaBowl champion (1993, 1995)
- Stats at Pro Football Reference

Corey Dowden (born October 18, 1968) is an American former professional defensive back in the National Football League (NFL).

== Biography ==
Dowden was born on October 18, 1968, in New Orleans, Louisiana.

== Career ==
Dowden's first professional experience was in two seasons with the Tampa Bay Storm of the Arena Football League. He was named Second-team All-Arena in 1995. He then spent a season with the Ottawa Rough Riders of the Canadian Football League before returning to the Storm for another season. During the 1996 NFL season Dowden played with two teams: First, with the Green Bay Packers and later that season he joined the Baltimore Ravens. He spent the 1997 NFL season with the Chicago Bears before returning to the Storm for one final season.

He played at the collegiate level at Tulane University.
