= Patrick McGuirk =

No. 26
- Position: Wide receiver / Defensive back

Personal information
- Born: July 22, 1967 (age 59)
- Listed height: 5 ft 11 in (1.80 m)
- Listed weight: 190 lb (86 kg)

Career information
- College: Cal Poly
- NFL draft: 1990: undrafted

Career history
- Winnipeg Blue Bombers (1990); Raleigh-Durham Skyhawks (1991); Frankfurt Galaxy (1992); Fort Worth Cavalry (1994); San Francisco 49ers (1995)*; San Jose SaberCats (1995–1998); San Francisco 49ers (1996)*
- * Offseason or practice squad member only

Awards and highlights
- 2× First-team All-Arena (1995, 1996)

Career AFL statistics
- Tackles: 286.5
- Pass breakups: 81
- Forced fumbles: 3
- Interceptions: 29
- Int return TDs: 1
- Stats at ArenaFan.com

Patrick McGuirk (born July 22, 1967) is an American former professional football defensive back who played five seasons in the Arena Football League (AFL) with the Fort Worth Cavalry and San Jose SaberCats. He first enrolled at the College of San Mateo before transferring to California Polytechnic State University. He was also a member of the Winnipeg Blue Bombers, Raleigh-Durham Skyhawks, Frankfurt Galaxy and San Francisco 49ers.

== College career ==
McGuirk first played college football for the San Mateo Bulldogs of the College of San Mateo from 1986 to 1988. He earned All-Golden Gate Conference and team MVP honors. He transferred to play for the Cal Poly Mustangs. McGuirk recorded 42 tackles and an interception for the Mustangs.

== Professional career ==
McGuirk signed with the Winnipeg Blue Bombers of the Canadian Football League in 1990. He was drafted by the Raleigh-Durham Skyhawks of the World League of American Football (WLAF) in the eighth round with the 75th pick in the 1991 WLAF Draft. He was selected by the Frankfurt Galaxy of the WLAF in the fifth round of the 1992 WLAF Draft. McGuirk played for the AFL's Fort Worth Cavalry in 1994. He recorded 54 tackles, 21 pass blocks, 2 forced fumbles and 5 interceptions for the Cavalry. In 1995, he was a member of the practice squad of the San Francisco 49ers of the National Football League. McGuirk was released by the 49ers in October 1995. He played for the San Jose SaberCats of the AFL from 1995 to 1998, earning First Team All-Arena honors in 1995 and 1996. He spent time with the San Francisco 49ers in 1996.
