= Willie Wyatt =

American football player (born 1967)

No. 55
- Position: Offensive/defensive lineman

Personal information
- Born: September 27, 1967 (age 59); Birmingham, Alabama, U.S.
- Listed height: 5 ft 11 in (1.80 m)
- Listed weight: 275 lb (125 kg)

Career information
- High school: Gardendale (Gardendale, Alabama)
- College: Alabama
- NFL draft: 1990: undrafted

Career history
- Tampa Bay Buccaneers (1990); Pittsburgh Steelers (1991)*; Orlando Thunder (1992); Philadelphia Eagles (1992)*; Detroit Drive (1993); Tampa Bay Storm (1995–2001)
- * Offseason or practice squad member only

Awards and highlights
- 2× ArenaBowl champion (1995, 1996); 2× First-team All-Arena (1997, 1998); 2× Second-team All-Arena (1995, 1999); Second-team AFL 15th Anniversary Team (2001); First-team All-SEC (1989); Second-team All-SEC (1987)

Career NFL statistics
- Games played: 7
- Stats at Pro Football Reference

Career AFL statistics
- Tackles: 36
- Sacks: 11
- Pass breakups: 7
- Forced fumbles: 2
- Fumbles recovered: 2
- Stats at ArenaFan.com

Willie Porter Wyatt (born September 27, 1967) is a former Arena Football League (AFL) player who played offensive lineman/defensive lineman for the Detroit Drive in 1993 and the Tampa Bay Storm from 1995–1999, and again in 2001. He wore #55. He also played for the Tampa Bay Buccaneers of the National Football League (NFL) in 1990.

Wyatt played high school football at Gardendale High School in Gardendale, Alabama.

Wyatt coached high school football as a defensive coordinator at Gardendale High, and was head coach of the wrestling team. Previously he was also the defensive line coach and head wrestling coach at Hueytown High School.

Willie Wyatt was frequently referred to as a father figure by the young men he coached. He, and his wife Annette Wyatt, would refer to many of the young men as “their sons.”
