= 1995 Albany Firebirds season =

Arena Football League team season

- Head coach: Mike Hohensee
- Home stadium: Knickerbocker Arena

Results
- Record: 7–5
- Division place: 1st, Eastern
- Playoffs: W Quarterfinals vs. St. Louis; L Semifinals vs. Tampa Bay

The 1995 Albany Firebirds season was the sixth season for the Albany Firebirds. They finished the 1995 Arena Football League season 7–5 and lost in the semifinals of the AFL playoffs to the Tampa Bay Storm.

== Schedule ==
=== Regular season ===
| Week | Date | Opponent | Results | | Game site (attendance) |
| Week | Date | Opponent | Final score | Team record | Game site (attendance) |
|---|---|---|---|---|---|
| 1 | May 13 | Charlotte Rage | L 49–51 | 0–1 | Knickerbocker Arena (12,965) |
| 2 | May 19 | at Arizona Rattlers | L 35–45 | 0–2 | America West Arena (15,121) |
| 3 | Bye | | | | |
| 4 | June 3 | Connecticut Coyotes | W 57–34 | 1–2 | Knickerbocker Arena (11,994) |
| 5 | June 9 | at Orlando Predators | L 47–55 | 1–3 | Orlando Arena (15,638) |
| 6 | June 17 | Tampa Bay Storm | W 42–36 | 2–3 | Knickerbocker Arena (11,801) |
| 7 | June 23 | at Connecticut Coyotes | W 63–31 | 3–3 | Hartford Civic Center (7,831) |
| 8 | June 30 | at Charlotte Rage | W 69–49 | 4–3 | Independence Arena (8,942) |
| 9 | July 8 | Orlando Predators | L 38–56 | 4–4 | Knickerbocker Arena (12,868) |
| 10 | July 15 | Miami Hooters | W 82–56 | 5–4 | Knickerbocker Arena (11,209) |
| 11 | July 22 | at Memphis Pharaohs | W 45–39 | 6–4 | Pyramid Arena (11,853) |
| 12 | July 29 | Iowa Barnstormers | W 73–56 | 7–4 | Knickerbocker Arena (12,603) |
| 13 | August 5 | at St. Louis Stampede | L 49–52 | 7–5 | Kiel Center (11,808) |

=== Playoffs ===
The Firebirds were seeded seventh overall in the AFL playoffs, despite winning their division.

| Round | Date | Opponent | Results | | Game site (attendance) |
| Round | Date | Opponent | Final score | Playoff record | Game site (attendance) |
|---|---|---|---|---|---|
| Quarterfinals | August 11 | at (2) St. Louis Stampede | W 51–49 | 1–0 | Kiel Center (9,082) |
| Semifinals | August 18 | at (1) Tampa Bay Storm | L 49–56 | 1–1 | ThunderDome (11,288) |

== Standings ==
| Team | Overall | | | Division | | |
| Team | Wins | Losses | Percentage | Wins | Losses | Percentage |
|---|---|---|---|---|---|---|
National Conference
Eastern Division
| Albany Firebirds | 7 | 5 | 0.583 | 3 | 1 | 0.750 |
| Charlotte Rage | 5 | 7 | 0.417 | 3 | 1 | 0.750 |
| Connecticut Coyotes | 1 | 11 | 0.083 | 0 | 4 | 0.000 |
Southern Division
| Tampa Bay Storm | 10 | 2 | 0.833 | 4 | 0 | 1.000 |
| Orlando Predators | 7 | 5 | 0.583 | 2 | 2 | 0.500 |
| Miami Hooters | 1 | 11 | 0.083 | 0 | 4 | 0.000 |
American Conference
Central Division
| St. Louis Stampede | 9 | 3 | 0.750 | 4 | 2 | 0.667 |
| Iowa Barnstormers | 7 | 5 | 0.583 | 4 | 2 | 0.667 |
| Memphis Pharaohs | 6 | 6 | 0.500 | 3 | 3 | 0.500 |
| Milwaukee Mustangs | 4 | 8 | 0.333 | 1 | 5 | 0.167 |
Western Division
| San Jose SaberCats | 8 | 4 | 0.667 | 2 | 2 | 0.500 |
| Arizona Rattlers | 7 | 5 | 0.583 | 3 | 1 | 0.750 |
| Las Vegas Sting | 6 | 6 | 0.500 | 1 | 3 | 0.250 |

- Green indicates clinched playoff berth
- Blue indicates division champion
- Grey indicates best regular season record

== Awards ==
| Position | Player | Award | All-Arena team |
|---|---|---|---|
| Quarterback | Mike Perez | - | 2nd |
| Wide receiver/linebacker | Fred Gayles | - | 2nd |
