= Titus Dixon =

American gridiron football player (born 1966)

No. 87, 89, 8
- Position: Wide receiver

Personal information
- Born: June 15, 1966 (age 60); Clewiston, Florida, U.S.
- Listed height: 5 ft 6 in (1.68 m)
- Listed weight: 152 lb (69 kg)

Career information
- High school: Clewiston (Clewiston, Florida)
- College: Troy
- NFL draft: 1989: 6th round, 153rd overall pick

Career history
- New York Jets (1989); Indianapolis Colts (1989); Detroit Lions (1989); Atlanta Falcons (1990)*; Kansas City Chiefs (1991)*; San Antonio Riders (1992); Philadelphia Eagles (1992); Sacramento Gold Miners (1993); Toronto Argonauts (1994); Hamilton Tiger-Cats (1994); San Jose SaberCats (1995–1997); Buffalo Destroyers (2000)
- * Offseason or practice squad member only

Awards and highlights
- Second-team All-Arena (1995)

Career AFL statistics
- Receptions: 209
- Receiving yards: 2,477
- Receiving touchdowns: 40
- Kickoff return yards: 3,165
- Kickoff return touchdowns: 9
- Stats at ArenaFan.com
- Stats at Pro Football Reference

Titus Dixon (born June 15, 1966) is an American former professional football player who played in the National Football League (NFL), Canadian Football League (CFL), and Arena Football League (AFL). He was selected by the New York Jets in the sixth round of the 1989 NFL draft with the 153rd overall pick.

Dixon was born in Clewiston, Florida. He spent his collegiate years at Troy State University in Troy, Alabama, where he currently holds several records for both football and track and field. He also spent time in the US Olympics tryouts for track and field. He was selected by the Jets in 1989. After spending 12 or so seasons playing professional football, Dixon spent time doing something he has always dreamed of which is teaching. While at Troy State University he majored in criminal justice and business. After his tenure in football he went on to be a deputy and teacher in Florida. He now spends his time teaching criminal justice and coaching football, track and field, and cross country. He also spends a lot of his time volunteering with youth for track and field and football.
