= Kyle Mackey =

American football player and coach (born 1962)

No. 15
- Position: Quarterback

Personal information
- Born: March 2, 1962 (age 64); Gladewater, Texas, U.S.
- Listed height: 6 ft 3 in (1.91 m)
- Listed weight: 220 lb (100 kg)

Career information
- High school: Alpine (Alpine, Texas)
- College: Texas A&M-Commerce
- NFL draft: 1984: 11th round, 296th overall pick

Career history
- St. Louis Cardinals (1984); Philadelphia Eagles (1986); New Orleans Saints (1987)*; Miami Dolphins (1987); New York Jets (1988–1989); Albany Firebirds (1990); Fort Worth Cavalry (1994)
- * Offseason or practice squad member only

Career NFL statistics
- Passing attempts: 134
- Passing completions: 68
- Completion percentage: 50.7%
- TD–INT: 3–6
- Passing yards: 729
- Passer rating: 55.8
- Stats at Pro Football Reference
- Stats at ArenaFan.com

Kyle Erickson Mackey (born March 2, 1962) is an American football coach and former quarterback who played for the New York Jets, St. Louis Cardinals, Philadelphia Eagles, and the Miami Dolphins of the National Football League (NFL). He was also an Arena Football League (AFL) player, who played quarterback for the Albany Firebirds and the Fort Worth Cavalry. He played college football at Texas A&M University–Commerce from 1980 to 1983 where he was an All-American and led the Lions to the 1983 Lone Star Conference Championship. His father was Dee Mackey, a former tight end for the New York Jets.

== Early life ==
Mackey was born in Gladewater, Texas and lived part of his life in Alpine, Texas when his father was a high school coach after leaving the NFL. His family moved back to East Texas before his high school years. As a student (at Spring Hill High School in Longview, Texas) he set multiple passing records and was selected to the all-state team in both his Junior and Senior years. Mackey accepted an athletic scholarship to Texas A&M-Commerce (then East Texas State University) where he was to play both Football and Basketball.

== College career ==
Mackey played for the Texas A&M-Commerce Lions from 1980 to 1983. As a freshman in 1980, he backed up All-American and future All-Pro Wade Wilson, a year in which the Lions were NAIA National Semifinalists.

Mackey took over at the starting spot during the 1981 season. He led the Lions to a 7–4 record and a fifth-place finish in the Lone Star Conference, throwing for 2.074 yards and 18 touchdowns. He was an Honorable Mention All Lone Star Conference Selection.

As a junior Mackey threw for 1,667 yards and 11 touchdowns and led the Lions to a 6–4 record, good enough for LSC conference runner-up (2nd place). He was a First-team All Lone Star Conference Selection and also was named to the Associated Press All-American team.

As a senior in 1983 Mackey led the Lions to a share of the Lone Star Conference Championship with an 8–2 record, throwing for 1,960 yards and 14 touchdowns and was named the LSC Second-team All-Conference team. During his time in Commerce he established himself as an athletic roll-out passer who was a dual threat either running or throwing the football. His career numbers were 5,814 passing yards and 43 touchdown passes and a 21–10 record as a starter.

== Professional career ==
Mackey was drafted by the St. Louis Cardinals in the 1984 NFL draft, being selected in the 11th round as the 296th overall pick. In his two-year National Football League career as a backup quarterback for the New York Jets and the Miami Dolphins, Mackey passed for 729 yards and 3 touchdowns, rushed for 563 yards, and threw 6 interceptions. Mackey started for the Dolphins against the Seattle Seahawks during Week 4 of the 1987 NFL season as a replacement player due to the National Football League Players Association strike.

Mackey later played in the Arena Football League (AFL), ending his AFL career with 187 completions on 346 passes attempted (54.0% of passes completed), 2,253 passing yards, 34 touchdowns, 14 interceptions and a quarterback rating of 81.96.

== Coaching career ==
Mackey is now coaching the Tigers of Silsbee High School in Hardin County, Texas.
