= Tyrone Johnson (American football) =

American football player (born 1971)

No. 80, 83
- Position: Wide receiver

Personal information
- Born: September 4, 1971 (age 55); Denver, Colorado, U.S.
- Listed height: 5 ft 11 in (1.80 m)
- Listed weight: 171 lb (78 kg)

Career information
- High school: Rangeview (Aurora, Colorado)
- College: Western State (1989–1993)
- NFL draft: 1994: undrafted

Career history
- New Orleans Saints (1994); Rhein Fire (1995); Atlanta Falcons (1996)*
- * Offseason or practice squad member only
- Stats at Pro Football Reference

Tyrone Benjamin Johnson (born September 4, 1971) is an American former professional football wide receiver who played one season with the New Orleans Saints of the National Football League (NFL). He played college football for the Western Colorado Mountaineers. He also played for the Rhein Fire of the World League of American Football (WLAF).

== Early life and college ==
Tyrone Benjamin Johnson was born on September 4, 1971, in Denver, Colorado. He attended Rangeview High School in Aurora, Colorado.

Johnson joined the Western Colorado Mountaineers football team of Western Colorado University as a walk-on. He was a member of the football team from 1989 to 1993. He set school records for yards in a game with 270, receptions in a season with 65, yards in a season with 1,141, career receptions with 163, career yards with 3,715, career touchdowns with 35, career yards per game with 103.9, and career yards per reception with 32.5. Johnson was also on the track and field team at Western State and set a school record in the 400 meters. He was inducted into the school's athletics Hall of Fame in 2003.

== Professional career ==
After going undrafted in the 1994 NFL draft, Johnson signed with the New Orleans Saints on April 28, 1994. He played in one game for the Saints during the 1994 season. In 1995, he was allocated to the World League of American Football (WLAF) to play for the Rhein Fire. He caught 29 passes for 463 yards while also returning one kickoff for 14 yards. Johnson was released by the Saints on August 27, 1995.

Johnson was signed by the Atlanta Falcons on February 16, 1996. On February 20, he was selected by the Scottish Claymores in the ninth round of the 1996 WLAF draft. He was released by the Falcons on August 17, 1996.
