= Darrick Owens =

American football player (born 1970)

No. 82, 81
- Position: Wide receiver

Personal information
- Born: November 5, 1970 (age 56); Boynton Beach, Florida, U.S.
- Listed height: 6 ft 2 in (1.88 m)
- Listed weight: 195 lb (88 kg)

Career information
- High school: Florida State University Schools (Tallahassee, Florida)
- College: Ole Miss
- NFL draft: 1992: undrafted

Career history
- Pittsburgh Steelers (1992); San Francisco 49ers (1993–1994); New York Jets (1995)*; Rhein Fire (1995); Denver Broncos (1995)*; New York Jets (1996)*
- * Offseason or practice squad member only
- Stats at Pro Football Reference

Darrick Alfred Owens (born November 5, 1970) is an American former professional football wide receiver who played for the Pittsburgh Steelers of the National Football League (NFL). He played college football for the Ole Miss Rebels.

== Early life ==
Darrick Alfred Owens was born on November 5, 1970, in Boynton Beach, Florida. He attended Florida State University Schools in Tallahassee, Florida.

== College career ==
Owens played junior college football at Northeastern Oklahoma A&M College from 1988 to 1989. He transferred to the University of Mississippi, where he was a two-year letterman for the Ole Miss Rebels from 1990 to 1991. He caught 18 passes for 305 yards and two touchdowns in 1990, and 23 passes for 329 yards and one touchdown in 1991. Owens led the team in receptions both seasons, and in receiving yards in 1991.

== Professional career ==
After going undrafted in the 1991 NFL draft, Owens signed with the Pittsburgh Steelers on May 1. He was released on August 31 and re-signed on September 1. He played in the first three games of the season for the Steelers in a reserve role and did not record any statistics. Owens was inactive in Week 4 and then released again on October 5. He was signed to the practice squad on November 16 and released for the third time on December 2, 1992. He re-signed with Pittsburgh on March 4, 1993. Owens was released on August 24, 1993, after the fourth of five preseason games.

On September 7, 1993, Owens was signed to the San Francisco 49ers' practice squad, where he spent the remainder of the 1993 season. He re-signed with the 49ers on May 4, 1994. He was on the team's active roster to begin the 1994 season but did not play in any games and was released on September 13, 1994, after the second regular season game.

On January 31, 1995, it was reported that Owens had signed with the New York Jets. In February 1995, he was selected by the Rhein Fire of the World League of American Football (WLAF) in the 1995 WLAF draft. He caught 35 passes for 501 yards and five touchdowns for the Fire during the 1995 WLAF season, leading the team in both receiving yards and receiving touchdowns. The Fire finished the year with a 4–6 record.

Owens signed with the Denver Broncos on July 11, 1995. He was the MVP of the American Bowl preseason game on August 6, 1995, against the San Francisco 49ers in Tokyo, catching five passes for 78 yards and one touchdown in a 24–10 victory. He was later hampered by injuries and released by the Broncos on August 27, 1995, after the final preseason game.

Owens was signed by the Jets again on January 30, 1996. He was waived on August 19, 1996, after the third preseason game.

== Personal life ==
Owens graduated from the University of Mississippi with a Master of Arts in higher education. He worked in employee relations at Florida State University, and later became the associate registrar of enrollment services at Georgia State University.
