= Michael Trigg (quarterback) =

American football player and coach

No. 17
- Position: Quarterback

Personal information
- Born: San Antonio, Texas, U.S.
- Listed height: 6 ft 3 in (1.91 m)
- Listed weight: 210 lb (95 kg)

Career information
- High school: Theodore Roosevelt (San Antonio)
- College: East Texas State
- NFL draft: 1989: undrafted

Career history

Playing
- Minnesota Vikings (1989)*; Detroit Drive (1989–1990)
- * Offseason or practice squad member only

Coaching
- Dallas Texans (1991–1993) (OC); Fort Worth Cavalry (1994); Milwaukee Mustangs (1995–1997); Grand Rapids Rampage (1998–2003); Philadelphia Soul (2004–2005); Corpus Christi Sharks (2007–2009)

Awards and highlights
- 3× ArenaBowl champion (1989, 1990, 2001); AFL Coach of the Year (2001); 2× Second-team All-LSC (1985, 1988)

Career AFL statistics
- Comp. / Att.: 35 / 80
- Passing yards: 538
- TD–INT: 9–2
- QB rating: 84.27
- Rushing TDs: 2
- Stats at ArenaFan.com

Head coaching record
- Regular season: 77–80 (.491)
- Postseason: 3–7 (.300)
- Career: 80–87 (.479)

Michael Scott Trigg is an American former professional football player and head coach in the Arena Football League (AFL). He played college football at East Texas State Lions (now East Texas A&M).

== Early life ==
Trigg lettered in football, basketball and baseball at Theodore Roosevelt High School in San Antonio, Texas. He earned All-City recognition in football and baseball.

== College career ==
Trigg played college football for the East Texas State Lions from 1984 to 1988. He was redshirted in 1984. He became the starting quarterback in 1985 and completed 82 of 167 passes for 1,114 yards, 9 touchdowns and 7 interceptions. Trigg also led the team in total yards per game with 175.3 and earned Second-team All-Lone Star Conference (LSC) honors. However, he also missed half of the season due to a shoulder injury. The team finished the season with a 5–5 record and tied for third in the LSC. He missed playing time in 1986 due to an injury and sat out the entire 1987 season because of a knee injury. Trigg returned as the starter in 1988, completing 75 of 183 passes for 1,256 yards, 15 touchdowns and 9 interceptions. He led the team in total yards per game with 104.3 and garnered Second-team All-LSC recognition. He helped the team to an 8–3 record and a second-place finish in the LSC. The Lions had started the season with an 8–1 record and were ranked as high as #2 in the NCAA Division II polls before losing the final 2 games. Trigg threw for 3,294 yards during his college career. He was also a team captain in 1985, 1986 and 1988. In 2014, he was inducted into the Texas A&M University-Commerce Athletic Hall of Fame.

== Professional career ==
Trigg was signed by the Minnesota Vikings of the National Football League (NFL) in 1989 after going undrafted in the 1989 NFL draft. He was released before the start of the 1989 season. He played from 1989 to 1990 with the Detroit Drive of the Arena Football League (AFL), winning ArenaBowls III and IV.

== Coaching career ==
Trigg was as assistant coach for the AFL's Dallas Texans from 1991 to 1993, serving as offensive coordinator. He was head coach of the Fort Worth Cavalry of the AFL for their only season in 1994. The Cavalry finished the regular season with five wins and seven losses, losing in round one of the playoffs to the Orlando Predators. He was head coach of the Milwaukee Mustangs of the AFL from 1995 to 1997, earning playoff berths in 1996 and 1997. Trigg was head coach of the AFL's Grand Rapids Rampage from 1998 to 2003, earning five consecutive playoff berths from 1999 to 2003. The Rampage won ArenaBowl XV in 2001, with Trigg being named Coach of the Year. He was head coach of the Philadelphia Soul of the AFL from 2004 to 2005. The Soul failed to make the playoffs either year. He was head coach of the Corpus Christi Sharks of the af2 from 2007 to 2009. He finished his Coaching Career with Robstown High School as the Assistant Head Coach and OC helping them to there first playoff win in over 58 years.
