= Ian Howfield =

American football player (born 1966)

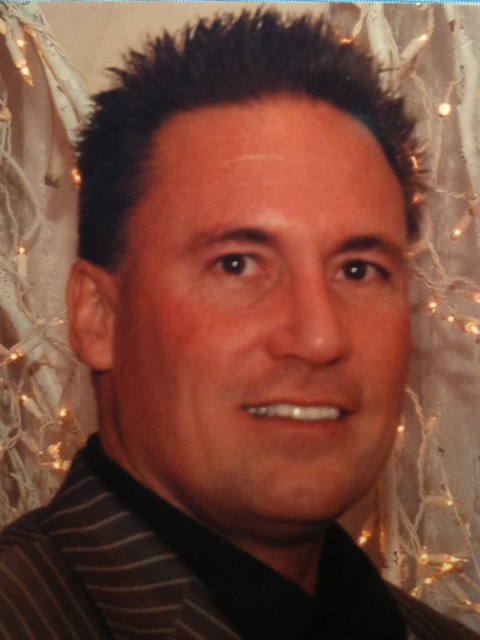
- Howfield in 2010

No. 6, 3, 10
- Position: Placekicker

Personal information
- Born: June 4, 1966 (age 60); Watford, England
- Listed height: 6 ft 2 in (1.88 m)
- Listed weight: 210 lb (95 kg)

Career information
- High school: Columbine (Columbine, Colorado, U.S.)
- College: Tennessee
- NFL draft: 1987: undrafted

Career history
- Miami Dolphins (1988)*; Seattle Seahawks (1989)*; Denver Broncos (1990)*; New York/New Jersey Knights (1991)*; Houston Oilers (1991); Philadelphia Eagles (1992)*; Tampa Bay Buccaneers (1993)*; Dallas Texans (1993); Baltimore Colts (1994)*; Fort Worth Cavalry (1994); Las Vegas Sting (1995); Anaheim Piranhas (1996–1997); Tampa Bay Storm (2003); New York Dragons (2003); Tampa Bay Storm (2004); Las Vegas Gladiators (2004)
- * Offseason or practice squad member only

Awards and highlights
- Second-team All-Arena (1995)

Career NFL statistics
- Field goals made: 13
- Field goal attempts: 18
- Field goal %: 72.2
- Longest field goal: 46
- PAT made: 25
- PAT attempted: 29
- Stats at Pro Football Reference

Career AFL statistics
- Field goal made: 92
- Field goal attempted: 192
- PAT made: 337
- PAT attempted: 401
- Stats at ArenaFan.com

Ian Michael Howfield (born June 4, 1966) is an English-American former professional football placekicker who played in the National Football League (NFL) and Arena Football League (AFL). Howfield, who played college football at the University of Tennessee, is the son of former NFL placekicker Bobby Howfield.

Howfield played in the NFL for the Houston Oilers in 1991 and led the team in scoring that year. He played in the AFL for the Dallas Texans, Fort Worth Cavalry, Las Vegas Sting, Anaheim Piranhas, Tampa Bay Storm, New York Dragons, and Las Vegas Gladiators.

== Early life and college ==
Howfield was born in Watford, England, the son of former NFL placekicker Bobby Howfield. Howfield moved to the United States when he was six years old. He graduated from Columbine High School in 1984, then attended Midwestern State University in Wichita Falls, Texas from 1984 to 1985 on a soccer scholarship. He transferred to the University of Tennessee in 1986 to begin his placekicking career, graduating in 1988.

== Professional career ==
=== Miami Dolphins ===
Howfield signed with the Miami Dolphins on April 29, 1988. In July 1988, it was reported that Howfield did not realize he was not an American citizen after going to get a passport for the Dolphins trip to London. In regards to being born in England, Howfield stated "I was so young I thought I was a citizen, too." He ended up carrying a British passport for the team's trip. He was released by the Dolphins on August 9, 1988.

=== Seattle Seahawks ===
Howfield signed with the Seattle Seahawks on January 1, 1989. Howfield became a U.S. citizen in 1989. He was released by the Seahawks on August 30, 1989.

=== Denver Broncos ===
Howfield was signed by the Denver Broncos on April 16, 1990. He was released on August 22, 1990.

=== New York/New Jersey Knights ===
In February 1991, Howfield was selected by the New York/New Jersey Knights of the World League of American Football (WLAF) in the 1991 WLAF draft. He was released on March 3, 1991, before the start of the 1991 WLAF season.

=== Houston Oilers ===
In August 1991, Howfield, who was kicking for the semi-pro Oklahoma Twisters at the time, was watching a Houston Oilers preseason game and decided to call the Oilers and ask for a tryout. He was signed by the Oilers on August 14, 1991. Howfield eventually beat out Teddy Garcia and Raul Allegre for the Oilers' kicking position after making all three field goal attempts (38, 54, 29 yards) in his preseason debut against the Dallas Cowboys. Howfield made 13 of 18 field goal attempts and 25 of 29 extra point attempts for Houston. However, after he missed a potential game-winning field goal against Washington (the undefeated Redskins won on their own made field goal in overtime), Howfield was released the following day by the Oilers, and never appeared in another NFL game.

=== Philadelphia Eagles ===
Howfield signed with the Philadelphia Eagles on April 30, 1992. He was released on August 24, 1992.

=== Tampa Bay Buccaneers ===
Howfield signed with the Tampa Bay Buccaneers on April 12, 1993. However, he was later released.

=== Dallas Texans ===
Howfield then played in seven games for the Dallas Texans of the Arena Football League (AFL) during the 1993 AFL season, where he was 7 for 27 (25.9%) in field goals and 19 for 23 (82.6%) in extra points.

=== Baltimore Colts ===
Howfield was signed by the Baltimore Colts of the Canadian Football League on March 9, 1994. He was released on June 13, 1994.

=== Fort Worth Cavalry ===
Howfield then played in nine games for the Fort Worth Cavalry of the AFL in 1994, where he made 10 of 29 (34.5%) field goals and 40 of 53 (75.5%) extra points.

=== Las Vegas Sting ===
1995 saw his first full season in the AFL with the Las Vegas Sting, during which he led the league in scoring for kickers with 120 points, a then-league-record field goal percentage at 71.4 (20 of 28), field goals made (20), extra point percentage (91 percent), and longest field goal (61 yards against the Miami Hooters). He was named Micatin Arena League Kicker of the Year and Second-team All-Arena for his season.

=== Anaheim Piranhas ===
Howfield joined the AFL's Anaheim Piranhas in 1996, where he went 21 for 43 (48.8%) in field goals and 63 for 73 (86.3%) in extra points. In 1996, he led the league in field goals made with 21 and was second in FG percentage at 48.8. The following year, he had a league-best 21 field goals made with a 47.7 conversion percentage, along with 62 for 74 on extra points. Howfield was in a life-threatening car accident that cut his career short at the end of the 1997 season in Las Vegas. He received two disk fusions in his lower back and an entire right knee cartilage replacement, and was out of football for five years recovering from the injuries (1998 to 2002).

=== Tampa Bay Storm (first stint) ===
Howfield made an AFL comeback in 2003, signing with the Tampa Bay Storm on February 22, 2003. In his first game back from the car accident, he made all three field goals. He was released by the Storm on April 8, 2003.

=== New York Dragons ===
Howfield was signed by the New York Dragons of the AFL on April 17, 2003, and concluded the season with a league-best 66.6 conversion percentage (10 of 15), followed by a 31-yard game winner in the playoffs as time expired to advance to the quarterfinals.

=== Tampa Bay Storm (second stint) ===
Howfield signed with the Storm again on November 6, 2003. He played in three games for the Storm during the 2004 season before being released on February 26, 2004.

=== Las Vegas Gladiators ===
Howfield signed with the AFL's Las Vegas Gladiators on April 4, 2004, as an emergency kicker. He played in one game for the Gladiators before being released on April 5, 2004.
