= Fort Worth Cavalry =

Arena football team

Logo

General information
- Founded: 1994
- Folded: 1994
- Headquartered: Tarrant County Convention Center in Fort Worth, Texas
- Colors: Cavalry blue, and gold

Personnel
- Owner: Peter "Woody" Kern
- General manager: Michael Trigg
- Head coach: Michael Trigg

Team history
- Fort Worth Cavalry (1994)

Home fields
- Tarrant County Convention Center (1994)

League / conference affiliations
- Arena Football League (1994)

Playoff appearances (1)
- 1994

The Fort Worth Cavalry was an Arena Football League team which operated for a single season, 1994, in the National Conference. The league did not want to abandon the idea of having a franchise in the Dallas/Fort Worth Metroplex, a major media market, after the demise of the Dallas Texans (1990–1993), and granted a new franchise to an ownership group in Fort Worth. The team was owned by Peter "Woody" Kern and led by head coach Michael Trigg. The team struggled with ticket sales and financial issues lead to the team being folded after the 1994 season.

== History ==
In December 1993, the Arena Football League announced that Fort Worth would join the league as one of three expansion teams for 1994. The Fort Worth Cavalry franchise was owned by businessman and minor-league baseball team owner Peter "Woody" Kern. The Fort Worth franchise replaced the Dallas Texans as the Metroplex's Arena League representative. Kern folded the team after the 1994 season due to attendance and revenue problems then, in 1995, sold the franchise to concert promoter Doug Logan and purchased a majority stake in the rival Tampa Bay Storm.

The team struggled to find buyers for season tickets. In addition to ongoing season-ticket sales, the club began selling single-game tickets for the 1994 season on May 2, 1994.

To drum up regional interest in the team and the sport, the Cavalry's first pre-season game was played at the Myriad Convention Center in Oklahoma City. The game was one of four exhibition games played by AFL teams in non-AFL cities in 1994. Halftime festivities included a tribute to longtime Oklahoma Sooners football coach Barry Switzer, then recently named as head coach of the Dallas Cowboys.

The Cavalry played their regular season home games at the Tarrant County Convention Center. All but the final home game were played on Monday nights due to other events tying up more lucrative weekend dates. They ended the season with the lowest home attendance of any AFL team in 1994. On the field, however, they were somewhat successful, advancing to the playoffs after finishing one game under .500 in the regular season. They lost to the Orlando Predators in the first round of the playoffs and were disbanded shortly thereafter.

=== Off-field moves ===
Fort Worth hired Arena Football League veteran Michael Trigg as its head coach. Trigg played college football at East Texas State University and as a quarterback led the Detroit Drive to the 1989 and 1990 Arena Bowl championships. After Trigg retired as a player, he spent two seasons as an assistant coach at ETSU and three seasons as offensive coordinator for the AFL's Dallas Texans. After the financial collapse of the Cavalry after the 1994 season, Trigg moved on to become the head coach of the Milwaukee Mustangs in 1995.

In his role as the team's general manager, Trigg hired NFL veteran Tate Randle as defensive coordinator, Marshall Foreman as special-teams coach, and Terry Gray as coach of the offensive and defensive lines as well as director of player personnel.

Controversy erupted when fans found out that one of the team's largest advertisers was Club Legends, a "totally nude" female strip club in neighboring Arlington. The strip club's promotional efforts included having its female employees wearing Club Legends T-shirts around the arena and a sideline advertisement urging Cavalry fans to "Call 1-800-NUDE BAR".

=== Roster moves ===
On December 13, 1993, the Cavalry, Las Vegas Sting, and Milwaukee Mustangs participated in the 1994 AFL Expansion Draft. Fort Worth acquired 16 players, one in each round, including 9 former Dallas Texans. One of these, then-current Dallas Cowboys player Lincoln Coleman, was chosen in the 16th round to secure his rights should the Cowboys release him.

In late April 1994, Fort Worth signed Steve Berry to play wide receiver and defensive back. Berry was one of 30 prospective players (along with quarterbacks Todd Hammel and Kyle Mackey plus wideout Robert Kirksey) in the Cavalry training camp and pre-season rosters. Before the regular season began, the roster was trimmed to the league maximum of 23 players.

Ultimately, Mackey split the starting job at quarterback with Hammel who had played for the Texans under coach Michael Trigg the previous two seasons. Mackey was injured during a July 1994 game against the Albany Firebirds. After the Cavalry shut down, Hammel followed Trigg to the Milwaukee Mustangs for the 1995 season.

After veteran kicker Ian Howfield departed for the Baltimore Colts of the Canadian Football League just before the regular season started, the Cavalry signed local favorite Trey Weir as a replacement in late May 1994. Cut by the Colts in mid-June, Howfield returned to the Cavalry for the remainder of the season.

Kelly Blackwell, a tight end for the Chicago Bears in 1992 and Dallas Cowboys in 1993, joined the Cavalry in June 1994. Blackwell has strong ties to the Fort Worth area having played high school football at Richland High School and college football for Texas Christian University.

== Players ==
1994 Fort Worth Cavalry roster
Quarterbacks: 5 Todd Hammel; -- Kyle Mackey; Wide receivers/Defensive backs: -- Chris Barber; -- James Dixon; 21 Carlton Liggins	Fullbacks/Linebackers: -- Kelly Blackwell; 38 Charles Rowe; -- Chuck Weatherspoon; Offensive/Defensive linemen: 8 Spencer Conley; 66 Monte Cuba; 99 Pat Danko; -- Brad William Henke; 83 Jerome Renners; -- Derrell Robertson	Wide Receivers/Linebackers: 1 Gary Compton; Kickers: 6 Ian Howfield; 55 Anthony Bifano	Injury Reserve Exempt list: Currently vacant; Rookies in italics Roster updated May 23, 1994; 16 Active, 0 Inactive → More rosters

== Season-by-season ==
Season records
Season	W	L	T	Finish	Playoff results
1994	5	7	0	4th NC	Lost Week 1 (Orlando 34–14)
Totals	5	8	0	(including playoffs)	

== Media ==
Todd Davis was the color analyst for the team's gameday radio broadcasts.

Home Sports Entertainment broadcast two of the Cavalry's regular season games: their home opener on May 23 against the Milwaukee Mustangs and the July 9th road game versus the Albany Firebirds. HSE also aired a weekly news program titled Fort Worth Cavalry Weekly Report each Friday at 6:30pm during the season.
