= Charlotte Rage =

Arena football team

Logo

General information
- Founded: 1992
- Folded: 1996
- Headquartered: Charlotte Coliseum in Charlotte, North Carolina
- Colors: Burgundy, teal, gray, white

Personnel
- Owners: Allen J. Schwalb; Joanne Faruggia; Cliff Stoudt
- Head coach: Rick Buffington

Team history
- Charlotte Rage (1992–1996)

Home fields
- Charlotte Coliseum (1992–1994, 1996); Independence Arena (1995)

League / conference affiliations
- Arena Football League (1992–1996)

Playoff appearances (2)
- 1993, 1994

The Charlotte Rage were a professional arena football team based out of Charlotte, North Carolina. They were members of the Arena Football League from 1992 to 1996. They played their home games at the Charlotte Coliseum from 1992 to 1994 and then again in 1996 and the Independence Arena (now the Bojangles' Coliseum) in 1995. They were owned by Allen J. Schwalb, Joanne Faruggia and former National Football League and United States Football League quarterback Cliff Stoudt.

== History ==
The Rage were founded as an expansion team on October 10, 1991, by motion picture financier Allen J. Schwalb, who backed some of the biggest blockbusters of the 1980s including Rambo, Rain Man, Moonstruck and Thelma & Louise. They competed in the 1992–1996 seasons. They played their home games at the Charlotte Coliseum, then also home of the Charlotte Hornets of the National Basketball Association from 1992 to 1994 and again in 1996. They played the 1995 season at the much smaller Independence Arena.

The team made the playoffs in 1993 and 1994, losing both times to the Arizona Rattlers in the first round. They are best known for signing former Buffalo Bills offensive lineman Joe DeLamielleure, who played only a handful of games in 1992 before retiring from football for good. He was the only member of the Pro Football Hall of Fame to have played in the AFL, a distinction that ended in 2017 when Kurt Warner, a three-year veteran of the AFL, was inducted.

Their logo consisted of an enraged bull which was both snorting fire and surrounded by it.

The team was discontinued after the completion of the 1996 season.

The AFL would return to the Coliseum for the 2003 Arena Football League season when the Carolina Cobras moved from Raleigh, North Carolina.

== Season-by-season ==
ArenaBowl champions	ArenaBowl appearance	Division champions	Playoff berth

Season	League	Conference	Division	Regular season			Postseason results
Season	League	Conference	Division	Finish	Wins	Losses	Postseason results
Charlotte Rage
1992	AFL	National	Southern	3rd	3	7	
1993	AFL	National	—	3rd	6	6	Lost Quarterfinals (Arizona) 56–49
1994	AFL	National	—	3rd	5	7	Lost Quarterfinals (Arizona) 52–24
1995	AFL	National	Eastern	2nd	5	7	
1996	AFL	National	Eastern	2nd	5	9	
Total					24	36	(includes only regular season)
Total					0	2	(includes only the postseason)
Total					24	38	(includes both regular season and postseason)

== Players ==
=== Arena Football Hall of Famers ===
Charlotte Rage Hall of Famers
No.	Name	Year Inducted	Position(s)	Years w/ Rage
??	Sam Hernandez	2011	OL/DL	1992

=== All-Arena players ===
The following Rage players have been named to All-Arena Teams:

- OL/DL Robert Stewart (2)
- K Mike Black (1)
- OS Khevin Pratt (1)

== Head coaches ==
Name	Term	Regular season				Playoffs		Awards
Name	Term	W	L	T	Win%	W	L	Awards
Babe Parilli	1992	3	7	0	.300	0	0	
Steve Patton	1993	6	6	0	.500	0	1	
Galen Hall	1994	5	7	0	.417	0	1	
Doug Kay	1995	5	7	0	.417	0	0	
Rick Buffington	1996	5	9	0	.357	0	0	
