= Connecticut Coyotes =

Arena football team

Logo

General information
- Founded: 1995
- Folded: 1996
- Headquartered: Hartford Civic Center in Hartford, Connecticut
- Colors: Navy, red

Personnel
- Owners: Ben Morris; Scott Gerard
- Head coach: Lary Kuharich

Team history
- Connecticut Coyotes (1995–1996)

Home fields
- Hartford Civic Center (1995–1996)

League / conference affiliations
- Arena Football League (1995–1996): National Conference (1995–1996); Eastern Division (1995–1996)

Championships
- Division championships: 0 Prior to 1992, the AFL did not have divisions

The Connecticut Coyotes were an arena football franchise based in Hartford, Connecticut. The Coyotes played in the Eastern Division of the National Conference in the Arena Football League.

== History ==
On June 22, 1994, the Arena Football League awarded the state of Connecticut an expansion franchise, and chose the name "Coyotes" in October of the same year. After a tough first season, in which the Coyotes finished 1-11, team president Robert B. Dixon announced that the team would be up for sale. On October 26, 1995, Connecticut Development Authority sold the Coyotes to Ben Morris and Scott Gerard for $750,000. Morris wasted no time hiring Lary Kuharich to become the second coach in Coyotes history.

However, a horrendous record of only 3 wins in 26 games over 2 seasons led to a disbandment of the team following the 1996 season, after Morris failed to sell the franchise to the Madison Square Garden.

The city of Hartford would receive another team in 1999 when the New York CityHawks became the New England Sea Wolves. However, this team's tenure in the city would also be short-lived, as the team moved to Toronto following the 2000 season.

== Season-by-season ==
Season records
Season	W	L	T	Finish	Playoff results
1995	1	11	0	3rd NC Eastern	--
1996	2	12	0	3rd NC Eastern	--
Totals	3	23	0	(including playoffs)	

== Notable players ==
=== All-Arena players ===
The following Coyotes players were named to All-Arena Teams:

- FB/LB Les Barley (1)

== Head coaches ==
Name	Term	Regular season				Playoffs		Awards
Name	Term	W	L	T	Win%	W	L	Awards
Rick Buffington	1995	1	11	0	.083	0	0	
Lary Kuharich	1996	2	12	0	.143	0	0	
