= 1995 Arena Football League season =

- League: Arena Football League
- Sport: Arena football
- Duration: May 12, 1995 – September 1, 1995

Regular season
- Season MVP: Barry Wagner, ORL

ArenaBowl IX
- Champions: Tampa Bay Storm
- Runners-up: Orlando Predators
- Finals MVP: George LaFrance, TB

AFL seasons
- ← 1994 1996 →

National: Eastern, Southern
American: Western, Central

The 1995 Arena Football League season was the ninth season of the Arena Football League (AFL). It was succeeded by 1996. The league champions were the Tampa Bay Storm, who defeated the Orlando Predators in ArenaBowl IX. The AFL realigned its divisions for the third straight year to two divisions per conference, a format that was then used until 2016.

== Team movement ==
Five expansion teams formed in the league: the Connecticut Coyotes, Iowa Barnstormers, Memphis Pharaohs, St. Louis Stampede, and the San Jose SaberCats.

Meanwhile, both the Fort Worth Cavalry and the Massachusetts Marauders were suspended and the Cleveland Thunderbolts folded. The Denver Dynamite remained inactive.

== Standings ==
Team	Overall			Division		
Team	Wins	Losses	Percentage	Wins	Losses	Percentage
National Conference
Eastern Division
Albany Firebirds	7	5	0.583	3	1	0.750
Charlotte Rage	5	7	0.417	3	1	0.750
Connecticut Coyotes	1	11	0.083	0	4	0.000
Southern Division
Tampa Bay Storm	10	2	0.833	4	0	1.000
Orlando Predators	7	5	0.583	2	2	0.500
Miami Hooters	1	11	0.083	0	4	0.000
American Conference
Central Division
St. Louis Stampede	9	3	0.750	4	2	0.667
Iowa Barnstormers	7	5	0.583	4	2	0.667
Memphis Pharaohs	6	6	0.500	3	3	0.500
Milwaukee Mustangs	4	8	0.333	1	5	0.167
Western Division
San Jose SaberCats	8	4	0.667	2	2	0.500
Arizona Rattlers	7	5	0.583	3	1	0.750
Las Vegas Sting	6	6	0.500	1	3	0.250

- Green indicates clinched playoff berth
- Blue indicates division champion
- Grey indicates best regular season record

== Playoffs ==
Quarterfinals
1	Tampa Bay	53
8	Memphis	41
2	St. Louis	49
7	Albany	51
3	San Jose	37
6	Orlando	55
4	Arizona	52
5	Iowa	56

Semifinals
1	Tampa Bay	56
7	Albany	49
6	Orlando	56
5	Iowa	49

ArenaBowl IX
1	Tampa Bay	48
6	Orlando	35

== All-Arena team ==
Position	First team	Second team
Quarterback	Jay Gruden, Tampa Bay	Mike Perez, Albany
Fullback/Linebacker	Les Barley, Connecticut	Cedric McKinnon, Tampa Bay
Wide receiver/Defensive back	Bernard Edwards, Miami; Barry Wagner, Orlando	Amod Field, San Jose; Darren Hughes, Memphis
Wide receiver/Linebacker	Darryl Hammond, St. Louis	Fred Gayles, Albany
Offensive specialist	Hunkie Cooper, Arizona	Titus Dixon, San Jose
Offensive lineman/Defensive lineman	Sam Hernandez, Las Vegas; Ralph Jarvis, Milwaukee; Kent Wells, Tampa Bay	Sylvester Bembery, Tampa Bay; Robert Stewart, Charlotte; Willie Wyatt, Tampa Bay
Defensive specialist	Patrick McGuirk, San Jose	Corey Dowden, Tampa Bay
Kicker	Mike Black, Iowa	Ian Howfield, Las Vegas
