= ArenaBowl IX =

1995 Arena Football League championship

Orlando Predators (6th)	Tampa Bay Storm (1st)
35	48
	1	2	3	4	Total
ORL	15	0	7	13	35
TB	15	14	6	13	48
- Date: September 1, 1995
- Stadium: Thunderdome; St. Petersburg, Florida
- MVP: George LaFrance, OS, Tampa Bay: Barry Wagner, WR/DB, Orlando (Ironman of the Game)
- Attendance: 25,087
- Winning coach: Tim Marcum
- Losing coach: Perry Moss

TV in the United States
- Network: ESPN
- Announcers: Tom Mees, Rick 'Doc' Walker

ArenaBowl IX was the Arena Football League's ninth ArenaBowl. The game featured the #6 Orlando Predators (7–5) of the National Conference against the #1 Tampa Bay Storm (10–2), also of the National Conference. This would be the first ArenaBowl to have the "War on I-4" rivalry featured in it. For the Predators, this was their third ArenaBowl appearance in their first five years of existence (having lost ArenaBowls VI and VIII). For the Storm, this was their fourth overall appearance (their second for Tampa Bay) with a chance to get three titles in five years.

The attendance was 25,087, highest in ArenaBowl history and the second-highest ever in the AFL (next to the 28,745 for a regular-season tilt between the Predators and the Storm in 1993.)

== Game summary ==
In the first quarter, Orlando made the opening move with WR/DB Barry Wagner getting a two-yard touchdown run, as well as a two-point conversion run. Tampa Bay responded with quarterback Jay Gruden completing a 10-yard touchdown pass to WR/LB Stevie Thomas, along with FB/LB Cedric McKinnon rushing into the end zone for the two-point conversion. The Predators responded with quarterback Pat O'Hara completing a four-yard touchdown pass to WR/LB Alex Shell, yet the Storm immediately answered with OS George LaFrance returning the kickoff 57 yards for a touchdown.

In the second quarter, it was all Tampa Bay; Gruden and LaFrance hooked up with each other on a 3-yard and a one-yard touchdown pass to take the lead going into halftime.

In the third quarter, Orlando drew closer as Wagner returned a blocked field goal three yards for a touchdown, yet the unfazed Storm went back to work with Gruden and Thomas hooking up with each other again on a 35-yard touchdown pass (with a failed PAT).

In the fourth quarter, the Predators played some catch-up as OL/DL Flint Fleming got a 14-yard touchdown run, yet Tampa Bay put some distance between themselves and the Predators with Gruden getting a one-yard touchdown on a quarterback sneak (with a failed two-point conversion) and WR/DB Tracey Sanders returning an interception 47 yards for a touchdown. Orlando got another touchdown with O'Hara completing a three-yard touchdown pass to Wagner with exactly one minute left, but there was no "Miracle Minute" for the Predators as the Tampa Bay Storm got their third ArenaBowl title in five seasons.

== Scoring summary ==
1st Quarter

- ORL – Wagner 2 run (Wagner run)
- TB – Thomas 10 pass from Gruden (McKinnon run)
- ORL – Shell 4 pass from O'Hara (Bennett kick)
- TB – LaFrance 57 kickoff return (Cimadevilla kick)

2nd Quarter

- TB – LaFrance 3 pass from Gruden (Cimadevilla kick)
- TB – LaFrance 1 pass from Gruden (Cimadevilla kick)

3rd Quarter

- ORL – Wagner 3 missed field goal (Bennett kick)
- TB – Thomas 35 pass from Gruden (Cimadevilla kick failed)

4th Quarter

- ORL – Fleming 14 run (Bennett kick)
- TB – Gruden 1 run (Gruden pass failed)
- TB – Sanders 47 interception return (Cimadevilla kick)
- ORL – Wagner 3 pass from O'Hara (O'Hara pass failed)
