= Community Choice Credit Union Convention Center =

Public events building in Iowa, United States

- "Vets", "The Barn"
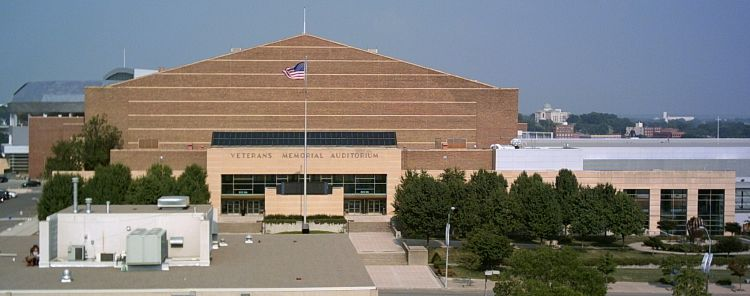
- Interactive map of Community Choice Credit Union Convention Center
- Former names: Veterans Memorial Auditorium (1955–2012)
- Location: 833 5th Avenue; Des Moines, Iowa
- Coordinates: 41°35′33″N 93°37′22″W
- Owner: Polk County, Iowa
- Operator: Global Spectrum

Construction
- Opened: February 1, 1955
- Renovated: 2010–2012
- Demolished: 2010-2012 (arena only)

Community Choice Credit Union Convention Center (formerly known as Veterans Memorial Auditorium) is a building located in downtown Des Moines, Iowa, that is part of the Iowa Events Center. Named to honor the World War II veterans of Polk County, it opened on February 1, 1955.

On May 22, 1956, Elvis Presley was the first major act to perform there while on tour of the upper Midwest. Elvis would perform in the auditorium twice more, on June 20, 1974, and his fourth to last concert ever on June 23, 1977.

It was home to the Drake Bulldogs men's basketball team from 1957 to 1992, who had previously used the Drake Fieldhouse as their home court and played their first game in their new home on January 11, 1957, against the Iowa State Cyclones. When it was home court for the Bulldogs, it had 11,411 seats with the capacity to add an additional 4,000 for concerts and another 7,500 bleacher seats for basketball games. Commonly known as "Vets" or "The Barn," it was the long-time host for minor league basketball, arena football, Iowa high school basketball and wrestling tournaments, and high school graduations.

Prior to the opening of Casey's Center directly across Third Street, Vets Auditorium had served as the primary venue of sporting events and concerts in the Des Moines area for many years; this was also the site of the January 20, 1982 concert in which Ozzy Osbourne bit the head off a bat. World Wrestling Entertainment also broadcast their WWE Raw program from the venue. It was also the site of the 1989 steel cage match between Hulk Hogan and Big Boss Man on Saturday Night's Main Event XXI.

With the opening of Casey's Center, the auditorium was relegated to a supporting arena role. In the fall of 2010, it was closed and renovated into a state-of-the-art convention facility that added a 28,800-square-foot ballroom to the Iowa Events Center in addition to 25 new meeting rooms. At this time, the naming rights were sold to Community Choice Credit Union. However, the structure itself is still referred to as the Veterans Memorial building. Veterans Memorial Hall was also added as a part of the renovation. The Hall showcases Iowa Veterans' sacrifices since Iowa became a state.
