= List of people from Passaic, New Jersey =

The following list includes notable people who were born or have lived in Passaic, New Jersey. For a similar list organized alphabetically by last name, see the category page People from Passaic, New Jersey.

- Rita Deanin Abbey (1930–2021), multidisciplinary abstract artist who was among the first art professors at the University of Nevada, Las Vegas
- Mitch Albom (born 1958), sports journalist and author of Tuesdays With Morrie
- Brant Alyea (1940–2024), former MLB outfielder; played with four different teams 1965–1972; one of nine players to hit a home run on his first MLB pitch
- Ronnie Ash (born 1988), track and field athlete specializing in hurdles who was selected as part of the U.S. team at the 2016 Summer Olympics
- John Barbata (born 1945), drummer for The Turtles
- William J. Bate (1934–2011), politician who served as a state senator, assemblyman, and judge
- Joan Berger (1933–2021), former infielder and outfielder, played 1951–1954 in the All-American Girls Professional Baseball League
- Peg Blitch (1934–2021), politician who served in the Georgia House of Representatives and Georgia State Senate
- Ernest Blood (1872–1955), high school and college men's basketball coach who was best known for his "Wonder Teams" at Passaic High School, which lost only one game in the span of a decade and set an American high school record for most consecutive victories
- Warren Bogle (born 1946), former Major League Baseball pitcher, appeared in 16 games, played for the Oakland Athletics during the 1968 season
- Terrence Boyle (born 1945), judge on the United States District Court for the Eastern District of North Carolina
- George Breeman (1880–1937), sailor and Medal of Honor recipient
- Herbert Brucker (1898–1977), journalist, teacher, national advocate for the freedom of the press, editor-in-chief of the Hartford Courant
- Bob Butterworth (born 1942), former Florida attorney general
- Jim Castiglia (1918–2007), football fullback, played in the National Football League for the Washington Redskins and Philadelphia Eagles
- Arthur K. Cebrowski (1942–2005), United States Navy admiral and senior U.S. Department of Defense official
- Morris Cerullo (1931–2020), Pentecostal televangelist
- Robert L. Clifford (1924–2014), associate justice of the New Jersey Supreme Court
- Alan N. Cohen (1930–2004), former co-owner of the Boston Celtics and the New Jersey Nets
- T. Zachary Cotler (born 1981), poet and novelist
- Howard Crook (born 1947), opera singer, tenor
- Edwin Decena, music video and independent film director
- Warren Dean (1932–1994), historian of modern Latin America, specializing in Brazil
- Mark DeRosa (born 1975), Major League Baseball infielder
- Beatie Deutsch (née Rabin; born 1989), ultra-Orthodox Jewish American-Israeli marathon runner
- Joel Diamond, record producer
- Paul DiGaetano (born 1953), politician, served in the New Jersey General Assembly representing the 36th Legislative District 1992–2006 and 1986–1987
- Dow H. Drukker (1872–1963), represented New Jersey's 6th congressional district 1914–1919
- Evelyn Dubrow (1911–2006), lobbyist and Presidential Medal of Freedom recipient
- Ronald Durham, civil rights activist, pastor and minister
- Peter Enns (born 1961), Bible scholar
- Charles Evered (born 1964), playwright
- Donald Fagen (born 1948), musician and co-founder of Steely Dan
- George Feifer (1934–2019), journalist, novelist, and historian, known for his autobiographical novels chronicling life in the Soviet Union
- Amod Field (born 1967), former wide receiver, played for the Phoenix Cardinals of the National Football League
- Jack Fina (1913–1970), pianist and orchestra leader known as "The ten most talented fingers on radio"
- Dorothy Fuldheim (1893–1989), journalist and anchor best known for her work for The Cleveland Press and WEWS-TV
- Joel Gersmann (1942–2005), experimental theatre playwright
- Ralph Giacomarro (born 1961), former American football punter, played in the NFL for the Atlanta Falcons and Denver Broncos
- Paul Goldberger (born 1950), Pulitzer Prize-winning architecture critic
- Rafe Gomez (born c. 1962), business writer, sales support consultant, lecturer, music producer and DJ
- Thaddeus Gromada (born 1929), Polish-American historian
- Hezekiah Griggs (born 1988), entrepreneur, philanthropist, and investor who became the youngest African-American venture capitalist when he founded H360 Capital in 2011
- David Grisman (born 1945), bluegrass musician and former member of Old & In the Way with Jerry Garcia of the Grateful Dead
- Diane Guerrero (born 1986), actress known for her roles as inmate Maritza Ramos in the Netflix series Orange Is the New Black and Lina on Jane the Virgin
- Reed Gusciora (born 1960), mayor of Trenton, New Jersey and former minority leader of the New Jersey General Assembly
- Beth Gylys (born 1964), poet and professor
- Helen Lee Gruehl (1902–1983), immunologist
- Steve Hamas (1907–1974), professional football player in the National Football League who turned to professional boxing, defeating former heavyweight champions Tommy Loughran and Max Schmelling
- Art Harris (1949–1970), running back who was involved in the 1970 Marshall football team plane crash that killed everyone on board
- Andrew R. Heinze (born 1955), playwright, non-fiction author, and scholar of American history
- Robert Helps (1928–2001), pianist and composer
- Stan Herman (born 1928), fashion designer, president of the Council of Fashion Designers of America
- Craig Heyward (1966–2006), National Football League running back
- Joseph Hirkala (1923–1987), politician, served in the New Jersey General Assembly 1968–1972 and New Jersey State Senate 1972–1987
- David Hirsch (born 1969), rabbi and rosh yeshiva at the Rabbi Isaac Elchanan Theological Seminary of Yeshiva University
- Gianfranco Iannotta (born 1994), track and field athlete who won a gold medal at the 2016 Summer Paralympics
- Dennis Johnson (born 1951), former NFL defensive tackle
- Daniel Johnston (born 1947), neuroscientist whose research has focused on the electrical properties of neuronal dendrites
- Mike Jorgensen (born 1948), former Major League Baseball player
- Ivan Paul Kaminow (1930-2013), electrical engineer and scientific researcher
- Lewis Kaplan (born 1933), violinist
- Ilona Murai Kerman (1923/1924–2020), dancer
- Keith Kidwell (born 1961), member of the North Carolina House of Representatives since 2019, representing the 79th district
- Fritz Knothe (1903–1963), former Major League Baseball player and member of "Wonder Team"
- Paul J. Lioy (1947–2015), specialist in the field of environmental health and specializing in exposure science who analyzed the effects of dust in the wake of the collapse of the World Trade Center after the September 11, 2001, terrorist attacks
- Barbara L'Italien (born 1961), politician, served in the Massachusetts House of Representatives 2003–2011
- Alex Lovy (1913–1992), animator and director who spent the majority of his career at Walter Lantz Productions
- Fred R. Low (1860–1936), mechanical engineer, long-time editor of the journal Power, and an international figure in journalism and engineering who served as mayor of Passaic in 1908–1909
- Ray Malavasi (1930–1987), former National Football League head coach
- William J. Martini (born 1947), former Republican congressman
- Joe McHale (born 1963), former American football linebacker, played in the NFL for the New England Patriots
- Mary Meriam (born 1955), poet and editor, founding editor of Headmistress Press, one of the few presses in the United States specializing in lesbian poetry
- Da'Mon Merkerson (born 1989), football cornerback who is a two-time Arena Football League ArenaBowl winner with the Arizona Rattlers
- Larry Mialik (born 1950), former National Football League player
- Nick Mike-Mayer (born 1950), football placekicker, played in the NFL for the Atlanta Falcons, Philadelphia Eagles and the Buffalo Bills
- Ron Mikolajczyk (born 1950), retired professional American football offensive lineman and retired professional wrestler, played in the NFL for the New York Giants
- Bill Mokray (1907–1974), basketball historian and statistician enshrined in the Basketball Hall of Fame in 1965 as a contributor to the sport
- Jack Mulhall (1887–1979), silent film and talkie actor
- Lester Novros (1909–2000), artist, animator and teacher
- Arthur Melvin Okun (1928–1980), economist who served as chairman of the Council of Economic Advisers between 1968 and 1969
- Emil Olszowy (1921–1980), politician who served for four years in the New Jersey General Assembly representing the 34th Legislative District
- Tom Papa (born 1968), comedian, actor, writer and television/radio host
- Morris Pashman (1912–1999), New Jersey Supreme Court justice, mayor of Passaic 1951–1955
- Millie Perkins (born 1938), actress, best known for her lead role in the film The Diary of Anne Frank
- Jason Perry (born 1976), former safety in the NFL 1999–2002
- Eleanore Pettersen (1916–2003), one of the first female architects in New Jersey
- Irving J. Phillipson (1882–1955), US Army major general
- Joe Piscopo (born 1951), comedian and actor
- Gerry Polci, drummer and singer with Frankie Valli and The Four Seasons
- Michael J. Pollard (1939–2019), actor, Academy Award nominee for film Bonnie and Clyde
- Gerald J. Popek (1946–2008), computer scientist, known for his research on operating systems and virtualization
- Stuart Rabner (born 1960), chief justice of the New Jersey Supreme Court
- Pamela Radcliff (born 1956), historian and professor at the University of California at San Diego and an authority on the history of modern Spain
- Frankie Randall (1938–2014), musician, singer and actor
- Joseph Rankin (1833–1886), U.S. representative from Wisconsin
- Ralph Rinzler (1934–1994), folk musician and folklorist
- John Roosma (1900–1983), captain of Ernest Blood's "Wonder Teams" who became the first college player to total 1,000 points for his career while at the United States Military Academy
- William A. Roosma (1935–2011), U.S. Army major general
- Alan Rosenberg (born 1951), Emmy Award-winning actor and activist, Screen Actors Guild president (2005–2009)
- Mark Rosenberg (c. 1948–1992), film producer
- Paul Rudd (born 1969), actor
- Carl Ruiz (1975–2019), restaurant owner and celebrity chef, best known as a judge on various cooking competition shows on the Food Network
- Bob Russell (1908–1998), entertainer
- Bob Russell (1914–1970), Hall of Fame songwriter
- C. Gus Rys (c. 1912–1980), politician who was mayor of Fair Lawn and served three terms in the New Jersey General Assembly
- Nick Sakiewicz (born 1961), soccer executive
- James Salter (1925–2015), author
- Zoe Saldaña (born 1978), Academy Award-winning actress, Avatar and Guardians of the Galaxy
- Víctor Santos (born 1976), Cincinnati Reds pitcher
- Albert Schatz (1920–2005), co-discoverer of streptomycin, 1943
- Elroy Schwartz (1923–2013), television screenwriter
- Sherwood Schwartz (1916–2011), TV producer, best known for creating Gilligan's Island and The Brady Bunch
- William Winfield Scott (1855–1935), lawyer who served as Passaic's official historian
- James P. Shenton (1925–2003), historian of nineteenth-and twentieth-century America and professor at Columbia University
- The Shirelles, musicians
- Rich Skrosky (born 1964), football coach
- Robert Smithson (1938–1973), artist best known for Spiral Jetty; wrote about his home city in "The Monuments of Passaic"
- Edith E. Sproul (1907–1999), pathologist whose work with Dr. Georgios Papanikolaou led to the development of the pap smear test for cervical cancer
- Mark Stevens (born 1962), former professional football quarterback, played in the CFL for the Montreal Concordes / Alouettes and the NFL for the San Francisco 49ers
- Thomas Stockham (1933–2004), scientist who developed one of the first practical digital audio recording systems, and pioneered techniques for digital audio recording and processing
- Tyronne Stowe (born 1965), former NFL linebacker
- Marcia Strassman (1948–2014), actress best known for her role in the television series Welcome Back, Kotter
- Loretta Swit (1937-2025), actress, best known for her role in the television series M*A*S*H
- Danny Szetela (born 1987), Major League Soccer player
- Dave Szott (born 1967), National Football League player and coach
- Jack Tatum (1948–2010), safety, played ten seasons in the NFL for the Oakland Raiders and Houston Oilers
- Ösel Tendzin (1943–1990), Tibetan Buddhist scholar
- Alvin Tresselt (1916–2000), author of children's books and editor of Humpty Dumpty magazine
- Paul L. Troast (1894–1972), building contractor, chairman of the New Jersey Turnpike Authority during its construction, and one-time failed gubernatorial candidate in 1953
- Rahshon Turner (born 1975), former professional basketball player
- Franklin Stuart Van Antwerpen (1941–2016), judge on the United States Court of Appeals for the Third Circuit
- Dick Vitale (born 1939), basketball coach and television sportscaster
- Liza Weil (born 1977), actress best known for roles in Gilmore Girls and How to Get Away with Murder
- Perry Williams (born 1961), former cornerback for the New York Giants
- Darrin Winston (1966–2008), Major League Baseball player, played two seasons for the Philadelphia Phillies
- Saul Zaentz (1921–2014), film producer
- Frankie Zak (1922–1972), Major League Baseball player, played for the Pittsburgh Pirates
