= Steve Goldstein =

Steve or Steven Goldstein may refer to:

- Steve Goldstein (diplomat), American government official
- Steve Goldstein (sportscaster), sports broadcaster
- Steven Goldstein (activist), American activist
- Steven Goldstein (racing driver), Colombian racing driver
- Steven R. Goldstein, American physician and author
