= Connie Newman =

American endocrinologist and physician-scientist

- Born: Connie Joy Baum; Passaic, New Jersey, U.S.
- Education: Wellesley College; Weill Cornell Medicine
- Scientific career
- Fields: Hypercholesterolemia, women's rights, reproductive healthcare
- Workplaces: VA New York Harbor Healthcare System; New York University Grossman School of Medicine

Connie Baum Newman is an American endocrinologist and physician-scientist specializing in hypercholesterolemia and lipid disorders, women's rights, and access to reproductive healthcare. She is an adjunct professor of medicine at the New York University Grossman School of Medicine. Newman was president of the American Medical Women's Association from 2019 to 2020.

== Life ==
Connie Joy Baum was born to homemaker Ethel Stuhlbach and pediatrician Samuel Baum in Passaic, New Jersey. Her family is Jewish. Newman's three siblings are all physicians. In 1970, she graduated as the valedictorian of Passaic High School. Newman completed a B.A. in biology and Spanish from Wellesley College in 1974 where she was a member of Phi Beta Kappa. On August 7, 1977, she married lawyer Jay Newman. Rabbi Leon Katz performed the ceremony in Livingston, New Jersey.

Newman earned an M.D. from Weill Cornell Medicine in 1978. At the Beth Israel Deaconess Medical Center, she conducted an internal medicine internship from 1978 to 1979 and a residency from 1979 to 1981. Newman was a fellow in endocrinology and diabetes at the Columbia University College of Physicians & Surgeons from 1981 to 1984 and a fellow in endocrinology in endocrinology at the New York University Medical Center from 1984 to 1985.

Newman is an endocrinologist and physician-scientist specializing in hypercholesterolemia and lipid disorders, women's rights, and access to reproductive healthcare. Since September 2007, she has served as a consultant attending physician with the VA New York Harbor Healthcare System. Newman is also, since February 2016, an adjunct professor of medicine in the division of endocrinology, diabetes, and metabolism at the New York University Grossman School of Medicine. Newman was the president of the American Medical Women's Association from 2019 to 2020.

Her research has covered topics regarding immunoactivity in primates, mammary gland development, as well as endogenous opioids in women. Her research has been active on 77 publications starting in 1981. On the 2 December 2020, she published as an editor for the book, How sex and Gender Impact Clinical Practice: an Evidence-Based Guide to Patient Care, which had a second edition released in 2026.

== Selected works ==
- Jenkins, Marjorie R.; Newman, Connie B., eds. (2020). How Sex and Gender Impact Clinical Practice: An Evidence-Based Guide to Patient Care. Elsevier. ISBN 978-0-12-816569-0.
- Newman, Connie B.; Chait, Alan, eds. (2022). Lipids: Update on Diagnosis and Management of Dyslipidemia. Elsevier. ISBN 978-0-323-98695-3.
