= St. Mary High School (Rutherford, New Jersey) =

Catholic high school in New Jersey

- logo

Location
- 64 Chestnut Street; Rutherford, Bergen County, New Jersey 07070; United States
- Coordinates: 40.829406°N 74.104446°W

Information
- Type: Private, Coeducational
- Religious affiliation: Roman Catholic
- Established: 1929
- School district: Archdiocese of Newark
- NCES School ID: 00861864
- Principal: Frank Viteritti
- Pastor: Fr. Michael Kreder
- Faculty: 18 FTEs
- Grades: 9–12
- Student to teacher ratio: 12.7:1
- Colors: Royal blue and white
- Athletics conference: North Jersey Interscholastic Conference
- Team name: Gaels
- Accreditation: Middle States Association of Colleges and Schools
- Newspaper: Highlander
- School fees: $895 (2021–22)
- Tuition: $11,532 (2021–22)
- Dean of Discipline: Dennis Hulse
- Website: www.stmaryhs.org

St. Mary High School is a four-year Roman Catholic high school located in Rutherford, in Bergen County, in the U.S. state of New Jersey, operating under the auspices of the Roman Catholic Archdiocese of Newark. The school has been accredited by the Middle States Association of Colleges and Schools Commission on Elementary and Secondary Schools since 2004.

The school was established in September 1929, with instruction provided through the Sisters of St. Dominic of Caldwell, New Jersey. The school's new building opened in September 1932 with 200 students and was formally dedicated in ceremonies held on November 5, 1932.

As of the 2023–24 school year, the school had an enrollment of 229 students and 18 classroom teachers (on an FTE basis), for a student–teacher ratio of 12.7:1.

== Athletics ==
The St. Mary High School Gaels participate in the North Jersey Interscholastic Conference, which is comprised of small-enrollment schools in Bergen, Hudson, Morris and Passaic counties, and was created following a reorganization of sports leagues in Northern New Jersey by the New Jersey State Interscholastic Athletic Association (NJSIAA). Prior to the NJSIAA's realignment that took effect in the fall of 2010, St. Mary was a member of the Bergen County Scholastic League (BCSL). With 148 students in grades 10–12, the school was classified by the NJSIAA for the 2019–20 school year as Non-Public B for most athletic competition purposes, which included schools with an enrollment of 37 to 366 students in that grade range (equivalent to Group II for public schools). The school was classified by the NJSIAA as Non-Public Group B (equivalent to Group I/II for public schools) for football for 2024–2026, which included schools with 140 to 686 students.

The boys basketball team won the Non-Public Group A state championship in 1935 (against runner-up St. Peter's Preparatory School in the playoff final) and 1937 (vs. St. Mary's High School of Perth Amboy). Down by five points in the last minute of play, the 1935 team won the Group II (since recategorized as Non-Public A) state title with a 32–31 win against St. Peter's in overtime.

The baseball team won the Non-Public Group B North state championship in 1962 and 1968, won the Non-Public C title in 1976 (vs. St. Peter the Apostle High School of New Brunswick) and 1977 (defeating St. Joseph High School of Hammonton in the tournament finals), and won the Non-Public A title in 1998 (vs. Sacred Heart High School) and 2019 (vs. Gloucester Catholic High School). The 1998 team finished the season with a 22–5 record after winning the Group B title with a 7–6 victory against Sacred Heart in the championship game.

The football team won the Non-Public B North state sectional title in 1976 and 1980, and the Non-Public Group I title in 2006. The 1976 team finished the season 10-0 after winning the Parochial B North sectional title with a 49–14 win in the championship game against a Pope John XXIII Regional High School team that had won 24 consecutive games and hadn't lost in 43 games, the state's longest streak at the time. The 1980 team won the Parochial B North state title with a 6–0 victory against Pope John XXIII after scoring a touchdown in double overtime to finish the season with an 8-0-1 record. The team won the 2006 Non-Public Group I sectional title with a 20–13 win in the championship game against Paterson Catholic High School, a team that hadn't lost all season coming into the game.

The softball team won the Non-Public B state championship in 1998 to finish the season with a 31–2 record after defeating St. Joseph High School by a score of 3–2 in the tournament final in extra innings.

The wrestling team was recognized as the winner of the 2007 team wrestling tournament for the Non-Public, North B state sectional championship. The wrestling team moved on to win the NJSIAA 2007 team wrestling Non-Public Group B state championship, topping Bishop George Ahr High School, 53–19. This was the Gaels fourth consecutive state championship, beating St. Augustine Preparatory School in 2004, Holy Cross High School in 2005 and St. Joseph High School in 2006 in the previous three finals. The Gaels had won six consecutive Non-Public North B state sectional titles (from 2002 to 2007), three District 16 titles and three BCSL National titles. St. Mary High School had filed a complaint against Queen of Peace High School with the NJSIAA, claiming that a new wrestling program run by former Gaels coach Scot Weaver at Queen of Peace would induce St. Mary's wrestlers to transfer schools. The NJSIAA ruled in 2007 that Queen of Peace would be restricted from competing in championships at any level of competition for two years.

== Administration ==
Core members of the school's administration are:

- Rev. Michael Kreder, Pastor
- Frank Viteritti, Principal

== Notable alumni ==
- Nick Boyd (born 2001), college basketball player for the Wisconsin Badgers
- Bob DeMarco (born 1938, class of 1956), football center who played 15 seasons in the National Football League for four teams
- Logi Gunnarsson (born 1981), basketball player for Njarðvík of the Icelandic Úrvalsdeild karla and a former member of the Icelandic national basketball team
- Wayne Johnsen (born 1977), boxer
- Hugh A. Kelly Jr. (1923–1999), politician who served in the New Jersey Senate for a single term representing District 3B
- Robert Leckie (1920–2001), author
- Da'Mon Merkerson (born 1989), football cornerback who is a two-time Arena Football League ArenaBowl winner with the Arizona Rattlers
- Mary Zeiss Stange (1950–2024), academic and writer, who was a professor of women's studies and religious studies at Skidmore College
- Stan Walters (born 1948), offensive tackle who played for 12 seasons in the NFL
