= Sam Perry (athlete) =

American track and field athlete

Personal information
- National team: United States
- Born: Sam Perry

Sport
- Country: United States
- Sport: Track and field
- Event: sprint
- Updated on 28 February 2016

Sam Perry (born 26 September 1945) was an American track and field athlete who held the world record for the 60 y sprint and who was twice United States champion at that event.

== Track career ==
Perry ran for the Fordham University track team.

In 1965, Perry, equalled the world record of 5.9 s for 60 yards of Bob Hayes whilst running for his college track team at the Millrose Games.

In 1963 and 1965, Perry became national indoor champion at 60 y.

== Accolades and awards ==
In 1977, Perry was inducted into the hall of fame of the Fordham University Rams.

In 1995, Perry's old high school, Passaic High School, named their new track after him

== Personal life ==
Perry was also a graduate of Columbia Law School.

In later life, Perry became an attorney and a city councilman in Passaic, New Jersey.
