= Steven R. Goldstein =

American inventor, author and professor

- Born: Passaic, New Jersey
- Occupations: Inventor, author and professor
- Website: goldsteinmd.com

Steven R. Goldstein is an American inventor, author and a tenured professor of obstetrics and gynecology at New York University Grossman School of Medicine.

== Early life and education ==
Born and raised in Passaic, New Jersey, Goldstein graduated from Passaic High School in 1967 where one of his best friends and classmates was the actor, Alan Rosenberg.

He is a magna cum laude graduate of Colgate University with a Baccalaureate degree in biology. He graduated from New York University School of Medicine in 1975.

== Career ==
After graduating from the New York University School of Medicine in 1975, he completed an internship in obstetrics and gynecology at Parkland Memorial Hospital in Dallas, Texas from 1975-1976. He then completed a residency in obstetrics and gynecology at NYU Affiliated Hospitals/Bellevue Hospital Center from 1976 to 1980. In 1980 he joined the faculty of the Department of Obstetrics and Gynecology at NYU School of Medicine, and became a full professor with tenure. He also maintains a half-time private practice as a generalist in obstetrics and gynecology and is affiliated with at NYU Langone Medical Center. Clinically, his practice has evolved, focusing more on menopausal and perimenopausal medicine with particular emphasis in ultrasound applications both for adnexal masses and abnormal bleeding.

Goldstein is a fellow and past president of the American Institute of Ultrasound in Medicine. He is a past president of the North American Menopause Society as well as the International Menopause Society. He served on the board of directors of the American Registry of Diagnostic Medical Sonographers, having prepared the test and administered policy for the certification of over 40,000 sonographers nationwide. He is a past chairman of the American College of Obstetrics and Gynecology, New York Section. He was author of their technical bulletin Ultrasound in Gynecology as well as the author of their practice guidelines on SERMs (Selective Estrogen Receptor Moderators). He served as the liaison physician from the American College of Obstetrics and Gynecology to the Women’s Health Imaging Panel of the American College of Radiology. He has been an examiner for the American Board of Obstetrics and Gynecology. He holds two patents in the medical device arena.

== Writing ==
Goldstein has authored such textbooks as Endovaginal Ultrasound and Ultrasound in Gynecology. Gynecologic Ultrasound: A Problem Based Approach, Imaging in the Infertile Couple and Textbook of Perimenopausal Gynecology. He has written books for the lay audience including Could It Be Perimenopause? and The Estrogen Alternative. He is the author of more than 60 chapters in textbooks and over 150 original research articles. His work has gained him recognition worldwide, and he is one of the most highly regarded individuals in the field of vaginal probe ultrasound. Because of his expertise, Dr. Goldstein has been invited to serve in roles such as guest faculty member, invited speaker, visiting professor, and course director over 400 times in the United States and across the world.

== Honors and awards ==
In 2014, Goldstein was made an honorary fellow of the Royal College of Obstetricians and Gynecologists in London. Only 26 Americans have received this honor since 1946. Also in 2014, the Association of Professors in Gynecology and Obstetrics bestowed upon him the Excellence in Teaching award in obstetrics and gynecology for the NYU School of Medicine, where he served as the associate director of the clinical clerkship. The Bellevue Obstetrical and Gynecological Society bestowed the Distinguished Alumnus Award in 2014.

In 2016, he received the Clarkson Award from North American Menopause Society for lifetime achievement in menopause research.

In 2019, he received the Joseph H. Holmes Clinical Pioneer Award from the American Institute of Ultrasound in Medicine (AIUM).

In 2023, the AIUM awarded him the William J. Fry Memorial Lecture Award in recognition of his distinguished career and contributions to the growth and development of medical ultrasound. Also in 2023, he received the Ian Donald Gold Medal from the International Society of Ultrasound in Obstetrics and Gynecology.

== Clinical research ==
In 1990, Goldstein was the first to suggest that a thin, distinct endometrial echo on transvaginal ultrasound in postmenopausal bleeding did not indicate the need for biopsy. He was also first to warn against unnecessary biopsy in non-bleeding postmenopausal patients with an incidental finding of thick endometrial lining on vaginal sonogram. Both of these assertions were affirmed by the American College of Obstetricians and Gynecologists (ACOG) in its Committee Opinion in 2009, and, ultimately, reaffirmed in 2023.

== Pharmaceutical advisory ==
Goldstein has a long history as an advisor and consultant to the pharmaceutical industry. He has been on gynecologic advisory boards and/or consulted for Amgen, Bayer, Boehringer Ingelheim, Eli Lilly, Merck, GlaxoSmithKline, Novo Nordisk, Wyeth, Procter & Gamble, Warner Chilcott, Shionogi, QuatRx, Depomed, and Pfizer. He has represented Eli Lilly, Forendo, Astellas Pharm, Acella Pharmaceuticals, Scynexis, Myovant Sciences, Avion Pharmaceuticals, L'Oréal, Cosmetique Active, Vichy, Peppy, Cooper Surgical, AbbVie, Mithra, Mylan, Shield, Pfizer and Mirabilis Medical and their appearances before FDA Advisory Boards. He has designed studies of uterine safety for Eli Lilly, Wyeth, Pfizer, and Glaxo Smith Kline. He has been a director of a publicly traded ultrasound company, Sonosite, Inc. from its inception until its sale to Fuji Medical in 2012.

== Personal life ==
Goldstein resides in New York City and Saltaire, New York.
