= Mary Zeiss Stange =

American writer

- Born: Mary Martha Zeiss; July 5, 1950; New Jersey, U.S.
- Died: July 6, 2024 (age 74); Lake Helena, Montana, U.S.
- Other name: Mary Zeiss Stewart
- Occupations: College professor, writer, rancher

Mary Martha Zeiss Stange (July 5, 1950 – July 6, 2024) was an American academic and writer. She was a professor of Women's Studies and Religious Studies at Skidmore College from 1990 to 2016. She often wrote on women and hunting, and on women and firearms.

== Early life and education ==
Mary Zeiss Stange was from Rutherford, New Jersey, the daughter of Frank A. Zeiss and Agatha V. Fiste Zeiss. Her father was a supermarket manager, born in Germany. Her mother was a public health nurse who served in the United States Navy Nurse Corps in World War II. She attended St. Mary High School.

She earned three degrees at Syracuse University, including a bachelor's degree in English literature in 1972, and her master's degree and Ph.D. in religion, in 1974 and 1982. She was a member of Phi Beta Kappa. Her dissertation was titled "The Procession of the Time-Bearing Gods: Soul-History in Autobiography" (1982).

== Career ==
From 1990 to 2016, Stange was a professor of women's studies and religion at Skidmore College. She was the first director of the Women's Studies program at Skidmore, and also served as director of Skidmore's Religious Studies program. She was the school's Edwin R. Moseley Faculty Lecturer in the 2004–2005 academic year. She retired with emeritus status in 2016. Stange also taught at Clarkson University, Black Hills State University, Dana College, Eastern Montana College, and Central Michigan University.

In addition to her academic work, Stange and her husband operated a bison ranch in Montana. She often wrote on women and hunting, or on women and firearms. "That doesn't mean that I think every woman should be heading for the hills," she explained in a 1997 interview. "Hunting is not for everybody any more than childbirth is, any more than a career in the military is." In 2018, she was the Democratic Party's nominee for a seat in the Montana Senate.

== Publications ==
Stange's work appeared in academic journals including Journal of Feminist Studies in Religion, Women's Studies Quarterly, Montana: The Magazine of Western History, and The Women's Review of Books. She also wrote op-ed pieces for the Los Angeles Times, the Chicago Tribune, USA Today and other newspapers. In addition to books and journal articles, Stange contributed to several encyclopedias, including The Routledge International Encyclopedia of Women (2000), International Encyclopedia of Women and Sports (2001), Guns in American Society: An Encyclopedia (2002), Encyclopedia of Protestantism (2004), and Encyclopedia of Religion and Nature (2005).

- "Treading the Narrative Way between Myth and Madness: Maxine Hong Kingston and Contemporary Women's Autobiography" (1987)
- "Jessica Hahn's Strange Odyssey from PTL to Playboy" (1990)
- "The Once and Future Heroine: Paleolithic Goddesses and Popular Imagination" (1993)
- "How the Media Encourages Violence, Yet Discourages Women from Owning Guns" (1994)
- Woman the Hunter (1998)
- "Arms and the Woman: A Feminist Reappraisal" (1995, 1999)
- Gun Women: Firearms and Feminism in Contemporary America (2000, with Carol K. Oyster)
- "The Political Intolerance of Academic Feminism" (2002)
- Heart Shots: Women Write about Hunting (2003, editor)
- "No More Raping: When Some Women Are Armed, Are All of Us Safer?" (2004)
- "The White Man’s Wounded Knee,’ Or Whose Holy War Is This, Anyway? A Cautionary History" (2004)
- "Women and Hunting in the West" (2005)
- "From Domestic Terrorism to Armed Revolution: Women’s Right to Self-defense as an Essential Human Right" (2006)
- Hard Grass: Life on the Crazy Woman Bison Ranch (2010)
- The Encyclopedia of Women in Today’s World (2011, co-editor, with Carol K. Oyster and Jane E. Sloan)
- "Hunting the Edges" (2014)
- "Hunting/Human/Nature" (2015)
- Hunting: A Cultural History (2022, with Jan E. Dizard)

== Personal life and legacy ==
Mary Zeiss Stange was married twice. Her first husband was another Syracuse graduate student, Jefferson Allen Stewart; they married in 1973. Her second husband was outdoorsman and magazine editor Douglas C. Stange. She died in 2024, at the age of 74, after a few years living with dementia in Lake Helena, Montana. Skidmore College has a Mary Zeiss Stange Award in Religion, "awarded annually to an outstanding senior student majoring in religion".
