= Gaye Tuchman =

American sociologist

- Born: 1943 (age 82–83)
- Citizenship: USA
- Education: Brandeis University
- Awards: I. Peter Gellman Award, 1981
- Scientific career
- Fields: Sociology, feminist studies, media studies
- Workplaces: University of Connecticut (1990-2011) Queens College, C.U.N.Y. (1972-1990)

Gaye Tuchman is an American sociologist. She is a professor emerita of sociology at the University of Connecticut. Tuchman is best known for her 1978 book, Making News: A Study in the Construction of Reality, about the sociology of news production. She is a past president of the Eastern Sociological Society.

== Early life and education ==
Tuchman grew up in Passaic, New Jersey. She attended Passaic High School, where she was editor-in-chief of the school newspaper. She earned an undergraduate degree in English and American Literature from Brandeis University in 1964. She went on to earn master's (1967) and doctorate (1969) degrees in sociology, also from Brandeis. Her doctoral dissertation was titled News, the Newsman's Reality.

== Career ==
Tuchman was an assistant professor at State University of New York at Stony Brook from 1969 to 1972. After that she worked as a professor of sociology at Queens College until 1990. From 1990 onwards, she was a professor of sociology at the University of Connecticut. In 2012 she earned the title of emeritus professor.

Tuchman has served as president of the Eastern Sociological Society, vice-president of Sociologists for Women in Society (she was one of 18 co-founders), a member of the council of the American Sociological Association, and the Board of Directors of Society for the Study for Social Problems.

== Research ==
Tuchman is mostly known for her book Making News: A Study in the Construction of Reality that applies the concepts of social constructivism and framing in a qualitative study of media production in New York City. Tuchman describes how

News is a window of the world. Through its frame, American learn of themselves and others, of their institutions, leaders, and life styles, and those of other nations and their peoples […] But, like any frame that delineates a world, the news frame may be considered problematic. The view through a window depends upon whether the window is large or small, has many panes or few, whether the glass is opaque or clear, whether the window faces a street or a backyard.

Together with Herbert Gans' Deciding What's News and Todd Gitlin's The Whole World is Watching, Tuchman's Making News has become one of the seminal texts for the sociology of news production in mass media. She was the first to describe, built on in-depth qualitative analysis, how news are the product of institutions, especially of journalists' strategies to manage their work, how news value is not an inherent property of events but a negotiated social process in which organisations select events from the daily abundance of potential news. In her perspective, the self-legitimation of media through the usage of visual codes, narrative and visual conventions through which they "radiate an aura of representation", but at the same time add to legitimizing dominant institutions and individuals, and the media's self-perception as committed to claims of objectivity, are important parts of this process, as well as scandalization as active management of social controversies to attract attention.

Tuchman has also studied the role of gender in cultural and media production

Since the 1990s, Tuchman has been mainly active in the sociologies of culture (including media), gender, and higher education, using ethnographic methods and occasionally historical methods in sociology.

== Publications ==
- Edging Women Out: Victorian Novelists, Publishers, and Social Change. Yale University Press. 1989. ISBN 9780300043167.
- Tuchman, Gaye (1994). Denzin, N. K.; Lincoln, Y. S. (eds.). "Historical social science: Methodologies, methods, and meanings". Handbook of Qualitative Research. Sage Publications: 306–323.
- Wannabe U: Inside the Corporate University. University of Chicago Press. 2009.
