= Rosemarie Fisher =

American gastroenterologist

- Born: Rosemarie Louise Lucianin; Passaic, New Jersey
- Spouse: John D. Fisher (m. 1969)

Academic background
- Education: BS, University of Toledo; MD, 1971, Tufts University

Academic work
- Institutions: Yale University

Rosemarie Louise Lucianin Fisher, RCPSC is an American gastroenterologist. She is the Professor Emeritus of Medicine and Deputy Title IX Coordinator at Yale University.

== Early life and education ==
Fisher was born to parents Stella and Walter Lucianin in Passaic, New Jersey, where she attended Passaic High School. She earned her Bachelor of Science degree from the University of Toledo before enrolling at the Wayne State University School of Medicine. After marrying John D. Fisher in 1969, she transferred to Tufts University for her medical degree and completed her medical internship at the Montefiore Medical Center.

== Career ==
Fisher later received a fellowship from the Royal Free Hospital in London and a second fellowship at Yale-New Haven Hospital (YNHH). Upon completing her gastroenterology fellowship, Lucianin Fisher came to Yale University for her digestive diseases fellowship in 1974. She had chosen Yale as her husband was completing a fellowship in cardiology at Montefiore Medical Center, and New Haven was "reasonable commute for Fisher for two years." She earned a faculty position in 1975 and was named chief of gastroenterology at the VA CT Healthcare System in 1977.

As the director of graduate education at YNHH, Fisher expanded Yale's residency program into 100 programs with about 1100 trainees. She oversaw the establishment of medical programs and became the first woman in the department to become a Full professor. In recognition of her "exemplary leadership; dedication to promoting the professional, ethical, and personal development of residents; and commitment to safe and appropriate care of patients," Fisher was the recipient of the inaugural 2006 Courage to Lead Award from the Accreditation Council for Graduate Medical Education. She was later the recipient of the Dema Daley Founders Award from the Association of Program Directors of Internal Medicine in honour of her international recognition as an educator, innovator, and leader.

In 2017, Fisher was elected to receive the Distinguished Service Membership from the American Association of Medical Colleges "for her contributions to advancing AAMC's mission, and her dedication to AAMC and the Council of Faculty and Academic Societies." The following year, Yale School of Medicine established the "Rosemarie L. Fisher, M.D., Graduate Medical Education (GME) Leadership Award" in recognition of her work. She was also elected a Fellow of the Royal College of Physicians. In 2020, the Connecticut Chapter of the American College of Physicians named their inaugural Female Physician Leadership Award in her honor and bestowed upon her its first recipient.
