= Passaic High School =

High school in Passaic County, New Jersey, US

Location
- 170 Paulison Avenue; Passaic, Passaic County, New Jersey 07055; United States; 40.855985°N 74.127401°W

Information
- Type: Public high school
- School district: Passaic City School District
- NCES School ID: 341254004836
- Principal: Jennifer Barker
- Faculty: 173.0 FTEs
- Grades: 9-12
- Enrollment: 2,580 (as of 2023–24)
- Student to teacher ratio: 14.9:1
- Colors: Scarlet and Navy Blue
- Athletics conference: Big North Conference (general); North Jersey Super Football Conference (football)
- Team name: Indians
- Rival: Clifton High School
- Accreditation: Middle States Association of Colleges and Schools
- Website: passaicschools.org/phs/

Passaic High School is a four-year community public high school serving students in ninth through twelfth grades from Passaic, in Passaic County, in the U.S. state of New Jersey, operating as part of the Passaic City School District. The school has been accredited by the Middle States Association of Colleges and Schools Commission on Elementary and Secondary Schools since 1927; the school's accreditation status extends until July 2031.

As of the 2023–24 school year, the school had an enrollment of 2,580 students and 173.0 classroom teachers (on an FTE basis), for a student–teacher ratio of 14.9:1. There were 2,525 students (97.9% of enrollment) eligible for free lunch and none eligible for reduced-cost lunch.

== History ==
Passaic High School's first graduating class, in 1873, had eight students, who attended the Acquackanonk District School. The first Passaic High School was constructed in 1886–87 at the corner of Lafayette Avenue and Bloomfield Avenue (now Broadway). The district's second high school was built in 1910 across the street from the original building on Lafayette Avenue. The present high school on Paulison Avenue was completed in May 1957.

The Paulison Avenue campus closed in July 2025 in order for work to begin on a new school with 490,000 square feet (46,000 m^{2}) of space which will be constructed at a cost of $328 million and take its place beginning in 2028. While the former Passaic High is being demolished and the new school constructed, classes will be held at two former elementary schools that were closed when an educational complex was opened on Dayton Avenue.

== Administration ==
The school's principal is Jennifer Barker. Core members of the school's administration are the two assistant principals.

== Extracurricular activities ==
Passaic High School NJROTC

Passaic High School hosts one of the largest Navy Junior Reserve Officers' Training Corps (NJROTC) programs in the country. In 2004 the unit was awarded the Navy's Unit Achievement award, and in both the 2005-2006 and 2006-2007 school years was recognized with the Distinguished Unit Award. Also in 2006 and 2007, the unit's Color Guard drill team won First Place at the National JROTC Championship in Daytona Beach, Florida.

Passaic High School Marching Band In 2006, at the USSBA National Championships at Navy–Marine Corps Memorial Stadium in Annapolis, Maryland, Passaic High School was recognized with the Best Percussion National Championship title and the Best Color Guard National Championship title in Class V. Also winning Nationals at USBANDS National Championship, 2004, 2005,2012, and most recently in 2021

=== Athletics ===
The Passaic High School Indians compete in the Big North Conference, which is comprised of public and private high schools in Bergen and Passaic counties, and was established following a reorganization of sports leagues in Northern New Jersey by the New Jersey State Interscholastic Athletic Association. For the 2009–10 school year, the school was part of the North Jersey Tri-County Conference, a conference established on an interim basis to facilitate the realignment. Prior to the realignment in 2009, the school competed in Division B of the Northern New Jersey Interscholastic League (NNJIL) which included public and private high schools located in Bergen and Passaic counties. With 2,396 students in grades 10-12, the school was classified by the NJSIAA for the 2019–20 school year as Group IV for most athletic competition purposes, which included schools with an enrollment of 1,060 to 5,049 students in that grade range. The football team competes in the Liberty Blue division of the North Jersey Super Football Conference, which includes 112 schools competing in 20 divisions, making it the nation's biggest football-only high school sports league. The school was classified by the NJSIAA as Group V North for football for 2024–2026, which included schools with 1,317 to 5,409 students.

The boys' basketball team won the Group IV state championship in 1920-1922 (defeating Trenton Central High School in the tournament final in each of the three years), 1923 (vs. Asbury Park High School), 1925 (vs. Union Hill High School) and 1929 (vs. Atlantic City High School); the four consecutive state championships won from 1920 to 1923 are tied for the most by any public school program in the state. A crowd of 3,000 watched the 1925 championship game at the Newark Armory, where the team won the Class A (since recategorized as Group IV) title with a 32–25 win against Union Hill. The 1929 team won the state title in Class A (now Group IV) with a 34–25 win against Atlantic City in the championship game, in a match-up that was close at the half until Passaic pulled away with a third quarter in which they outscored Atlantic City by an 11-1 margin. The team won the 2001 North I, Group IV state sectional championship, edging Teaneck High School 64–62 in the tournament final.

The boys cross country running team won the All-Group Public state championship in 1924, 1925 and 1927, won the Group A state championship in 1928-1931 and won the All-Group state title in 1932-1934 and 1944. The program's eight state titles are ranked ninth in the state.

The football team won the North I Group IV state championship in 1981-1983, 1985 and 1989. The 1981 team finished the season with a record of 11–0 after winning the North I Group IV sectional title with a 29–0 win in the championship game against Bayonne High School played at Giants Stadium. Craig Heyward scored all of his team's points and took the state scoring title as the 1982 team defeated North Bergen High School by a score of 21–0 in the championship game to win the North I Group IV sectional title and finish the season at 9–2. Behind three touchdowns by Heyward, the 1983 team finished the season 11-0 and was ranked third in the nation by USA Today after winning the North I Group IV title with a 24–13 win against North Bergen in front of a crowd of ten thousand in the championship game. The school has maintained a rivalry with Clifton High School, which was listed by The Record as one of the best in Bergen and Passaic counties; though the schools first faced each other before then, from 1950 through the 2017 season, Clifton is ahead with a 39-20-2 record in games between the two schools.

The boys track team won the Group IV spring / outdoor track state championship in 1986.

== Awards, recognition and rankings ==
The school was the 317th-ranked public high school in New Jersey out of 339 schools statewide in New Jersey Monthly magazine's September 2014 cover story on the state's "Top Public High Schools", using a new ranking methodology. The school had been ranked 282nd in the state of 328 schools in 2012, after being ranked 313th in 2010 out of 322 schools listed. The magazine ranked the school 312th in 2008 out of 316 schools. The school was ranked 310th in the magazine's September 2006 issue, which surveyed 316 schools across the state.

== Notable alumni ==
Notable alumni of Passaic High School include:

- Rita Deanin Abbey (1930–2021), multidisciplinary abstract artist who was among the first art professors at the University of Nevada, Las Vegas
- Jim Castiglia (1918-2007), fullback who played in the National Football League for the Washington Redskins and the Philadelphia Eagles
- Ronald Durham (class of 1968), civil rights activist, pastor and minister
- George Feifer (1934–2019), journalist, novelist, and historian, known for his autobiographical novels chronicling life in the Soviet Union
- Nicholas Felice (1927–2021), politician who represented the 40th Legislative District in the New Jersey General Assembly from 1982 to 2002
- Amod Field (born 1967), former NFL wide receiver who played one season with the Phoenix Cardinals
- Rosemarie Fisher, gastroenterologist
- John Knowles Fitch (1880–1969), founder of Fitch Ratings
- Louis J. Gill (1940–2020), politician who served in the New Jersey General Assembly
- Steven R. Goldstein (class of 1967), inventor and author who is a professor of obstetrics and gynecology
- Rafe Gomez (born c. 1962), business writer, sales support consultant, lecturer, music producer and DJ
- Hezekiah Griggs (1988–2016), entrepreneur, philanthropist and investor
- Helen Lee Gruehl (1902–1983), immunologist
- Steve Hamas (1907–1974), professional football player in the National Football League who turned to professional boxing, defeating former heavyweight champions Tommy Loughran and Max Schmelling
- Art Harris:(1949–1970), running back at Marshall University who was killed in the 1970 Marshall University Football team plane crash
- Stan Herman (born 1928), fashion designer who was President of the Council of Fashion Designers of America
- Craig Heyward (1966–2006), a running back who was a Heisman Trophy candidate in 1987 and played for the New Orleans Saints, Chicago Bears, Atlanta Falcons, St. Louis Rams, and Indianapolis Colts in an 11-year National Football League career
- Joseph Hirkala (1923–1987), politician who served in the New Jersey General Assembly from 1968 to 1972 and New Jersey State Senate from 1972 until 1987
- Dennis Johnson (born 1951), former NFL defensive tackle who played for the Washington Redskins and Buffalo Bills
- Ivan Paul Kaminow (1930–2013, class of 1948), electrical engineer and scientific researcher
- Augie Lio (1918–1989), football player, who was elected to the College Football Hall of Fame in 1979
- Paul J. Lioy (1947–2015), environmental health scientist who worked in the field of exposure science
- William J. Martini (born 1947), United States district court judge who represented New Jersey's 8th congressional district in Congress
- Nick Mike-Mayer (born 1950), football placekicker who played in the NFL for the Atlanta Falcons, Philadelphia Eagles and the Buffalo Bills
- Ron Mikolajczyk (born 1950), retired professional American football offensive lineman and retired professional wrestler, who played in the NFL for the New York Giants
- Bill Mokray (1907–1974), basketball historian and statistician enshrined in the Basketball Hall of Fame in 1965 as a contributor to the sport
- Roland Moss (born 1946), former American football tight end who played for three seasons in the NFL
- Connie Newman (class of 1970), endocrinologist and physician-scientist who served as president of the American Medical Women's Association
- Morris Pashman (1912–1999), Justice of the New Jersey Supreme Court, and before that a judge on New Jersey Superior Court and Mayor of Passaic, New Jersey
- Sam Perry (born c. 1945), track and field athlete who held the world record for the 60-yard dash and who was twice United States champion at that event
- Stuart Rabner (born 1960), Chief Justice of the New Jersey Supreme Court
- John Roosma (1900–1983), captain of Ernest Blood's "Wonder Teams" who became the first college player to total 1,000 points for his career while at the United States Military Academy
- Alan Rosenberg (born 1950, class of 1968), actor best known for portraying the character Eli Levinson in both American legal drama series Civil Wars and L.A. Law
- Mark Rosenberg (1948–1992, class of 1966), film producer whose works included The Killing Fields
- Víctor Santos (born 1976), starting pitcher who has played for the Cincinnati Reds, Detroit Tigers, Colorado Rockies, Texas Rangers and Milwaukee Brewers
- Zalman Shapiro (1920–2016, class of 1938), chemist and inventor who played a key role in the development of the reactor that powered the world's first nuclear powered submarine, Nautilus
- The Shirelles, the first major female vocal group of the rock and roll era and the first girl group to have a number one single on the Billboard Hot 100
- Nathan Sonenshein (1915–2001, class of 1933), rear admiral in the United States Navy
- Mark Stevens (born 1962), former professional football quarterback who played in the CFL for the Montreal Concordes / Alouettes and the NFL for the San Francisco 49ers
- Tyronne Stowe (born 1965), former NFL linebacker
- Jack Tatum (1948–2010), former American football defensive back who played ten seasons from 1971 to 1980 for the Oakland Raiders and Houston Oilers in the National Football League
- Alvin Tresselt (1916–2000, class of 1934), author of children's books and editor of Humpty Dumpty magazine
- Paul L. Troast (1894–1972, class of 1908), building contractor, chairman of the New Jersey Turnpike Authority during its construction, and failed gubernatorial candidate in 1953
- Gaye Tuchman (born 1943, class of 1960), sociologist best known for her 1978 book, Making News: A Study in the Construction of Reality
- Rahshon Turner (born 1975), professional basketball player who is a veteran of the European leagues, playing for teams in the Netherlands, France, Israel, and Spain

== Notable staff ==
- Between 1915 and 1924, Ernest Blood coached the school's basketball team to a 200–1 record. Passaic was unbeaten for 159 games over more than five seasons, a feat which is considered to be the longest winning streak in basketball history.
