= John Roosma =

American basketball player

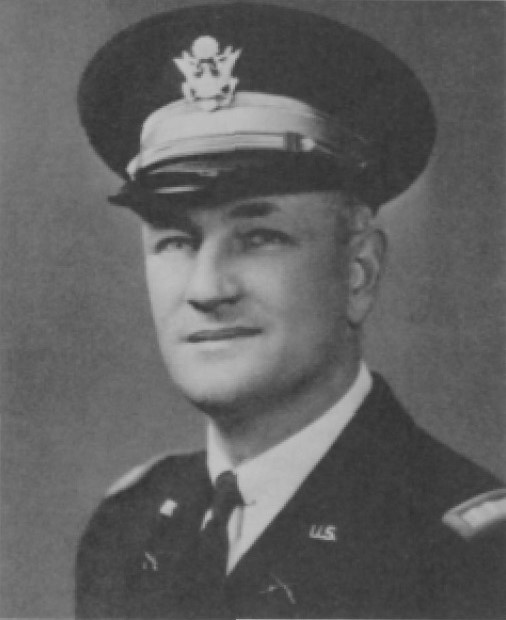
John Roosma as an Army captain (late 1930s)

John Sieba Roosma (September 3, 1900 – November 13, 1983) was an amateur basketball player during the 1920s. He played for the United States Military Academy for five years, graduating in 1926. The Passaic, New Jersey native was a prolific scorer and became the first college player to total 1,000 points for his career.

As a member of Ernest Blood's Passaic "Wonder Teams" Roosma gained almost legendary status already in high school on a team that won 179 consecutive games. Roosma captained the team and led them as scorer in three state tournaments (1919–21). After graduating from Passaic High School in 1921, General Douglas MacArthur recruited Roosma to play for the Army Black Knights. In five years the Roosma-led Black Knights compiled a 73–13 record and won 33 consecutive games at one point. After a 74-game career, Roosma totaled 1,126 points, being the first college player to score more than 1,000 in his career (Christian Steinmetz held the record with 950 points, in 40 games played in three years overall). Roosma was inducted to the Basketball Hall of Fame in 1961. West Point's basketball Most Valuable Player award is named after him.

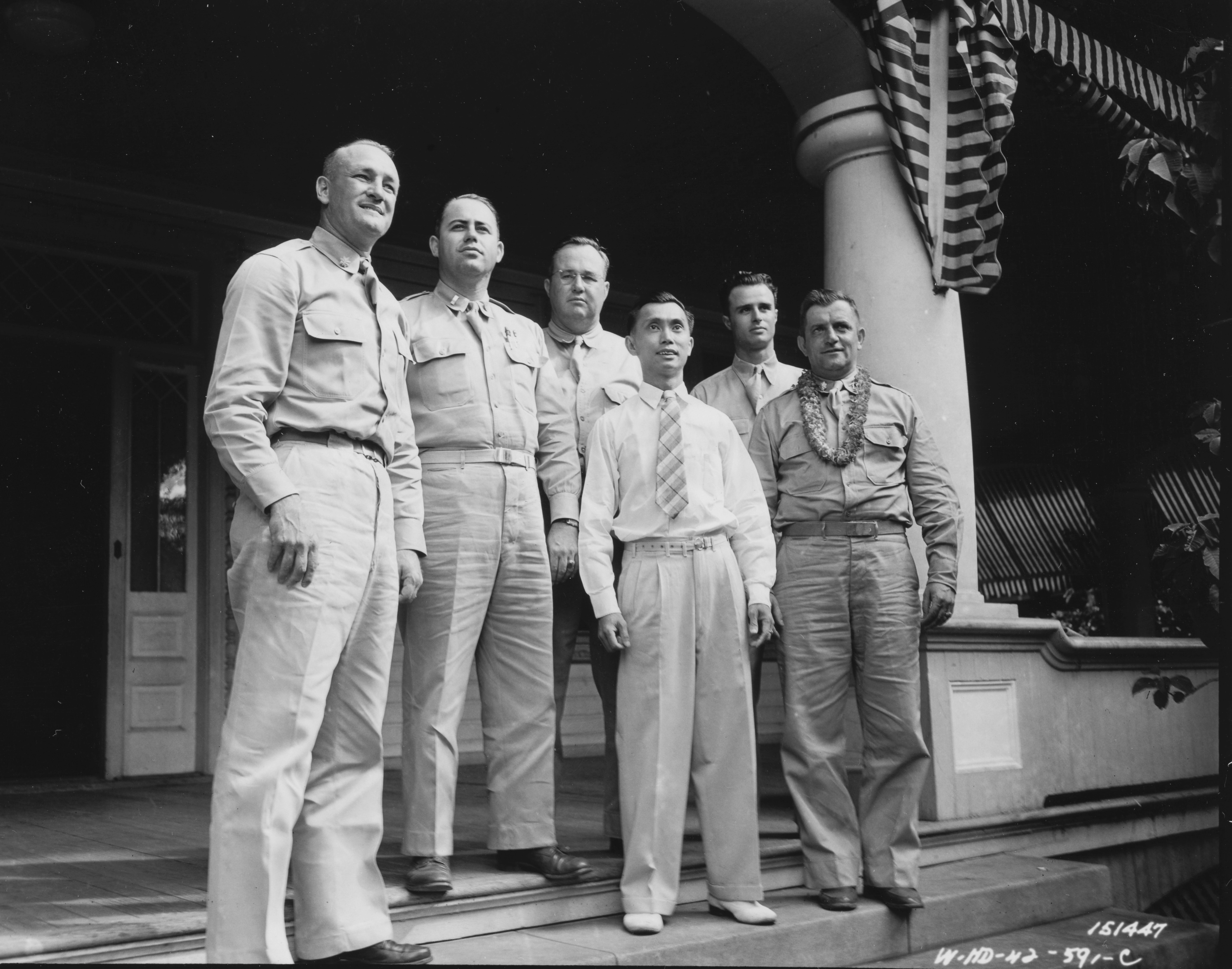
Col. John Roosma (left) in Hawaii (1942)

Roosma became a colonel in the US Army. He was stationed in Hawaii when the Japanese attacked at Pearl Harbor and then went on to lead the 334th Combat Infantry Regiment into Germany. Roosma retired in 1956 after thirty years of military service.

Roosma married Marjorie Perine Henion on August 3, 1926, in Passaic, New Jersey. They had three sons, all of whom attended West Point. The eldest, John Jr., left before graduating and joined the United States Air Force, retiring as a colonel. The twins, Garret and William, graduated in 1958. William became a career Army officer, retiring as a major general. Garret served in the army and Army Reserve, and retired as a colonel. Roosma and his wife had seven grandchildren.

After retirement, Roosma served several years as the commandant of cadets at the Bordentown Military Institute. He died in his home in Verona, New Jersey on November 13, 1983. Roosma and his wife were buried at the West Point Cemetery. In 2006, he became an inaugural member of the National Collegiate Basketball Hall of Fame.
