= William A. Roosma =

U.S. Army major general

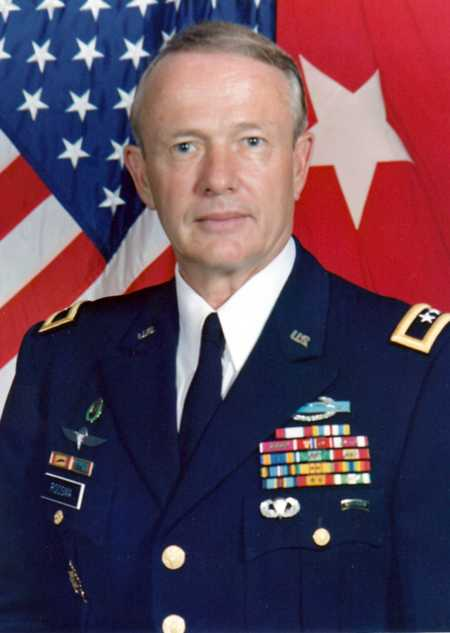
- Roosma as deputy commander of XVIII Airborne Corps in 1991
- Born: April 18, 1935; Governors Island, New York, U.S.
- Died: April 29, 2011 (aged 76); Fairfax Station, Virginia, U.S.
- Burial place: Arlington National Cemetery
- Alma mater: United States Military Academy; Auburn University at Montgomery; Armed Forces Staff College; Air War College
- Spouse: Sandra Youmans (m. 1962–2011)
- Children: 2
- Relatives: John Roosma (father)
- Military career
- Service: United States Army
- Service years: 1958–1991
- Rank: Major General
- Service number: 083450
- Unit: U.S. Army Infantry Branch
- Commands: Headquarters and Headquarters Company, 1st Battalion, 3rd Training Brigade; Military Science Department, Culver Military Academy; 4th Battalion, 10th Infantry Regiment, 193rd Infantry Brigade; Jungle Operations Training Center, Fort Sherman, Panama; 2nd Infantry Brigade, 25th Infantry Division; Armed Forces Inaugural Committee; XVIII Airborne Corps (acting)
- Wars: Vietnam War; Operation Just Cause
- Awards: Army Distinguished Service Medal; Defense Superior Service Medal; Legion of Merit (5); Bronze Star Medal (2); Meritorious Service Medal (4); Air Medal (2); Army Commendation Medal (3)

William A. Roosma (April 18, 1935 – April 29, 2011) was a career officer in the United States Army. A veteran of the Vietnam War and Operation Just Cause, he attained the rank of major general and his command assignments included: Headquarters and Headquarters Company, 1st Battalion, 3rd Training Brigade; the Military Science Department at Culver Military Academy; 4th Battalion, 10th Infantry Regiment; the 193rd Infantry Brigade, the Jungle Operations Training Center at Fort Sherman, Panama; 2nd Infantry Brigade, 25th Infantry Division; the Armed Forces Inaugural Committee that coordinated U.S. military participation in the Second inauguration of Ronald Reagan; and acting commander of XVIII Airborne Corps.

A 1958 graduate of the United States Military Academy (West Point), Roosma's additional civilian education included a master's degree in public relations and a master's degree in public administration, both from Auburn University at Montgomery. His military education included graduation from the Armed Forces Staff College and Air War College. His awards included the Army Distinguished Service Medal, Defense Superior Service Medal, five awards of the Legion of Merit, two awards of the Bronze Star Medal, four awards of the Meritorious Service Medal, two awards of the Air Medal, and three awards of the Army Commendation Medal.

== Early life ==
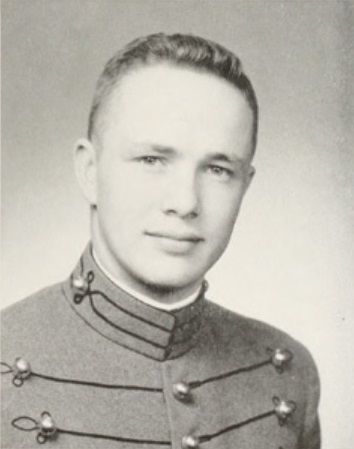
Roosma as a senior at the United States Military Academy, 1958

William Arnoux Roosma was born on Governors Island, New York on April 18, 1935, a son of army officer John Roosma and Marjorie (Henion) Roosma. The Roosma family was residing at Schofield Barracks, Hawaii when Japan's Attack on Pearl Harbor took place in December 1941, and the six-year-old Roosma was a witness to the event.

Roosma was raised at military posts in the United States and overseas, attended The Hill School, and was a 1953 graduate of Heidelberg High School. From 1953 to 1954, he attended the Braden School in Cornwall-on-Hudson, New York, an academy that prepared prospective students for the entrance exams at the United States Military Academy (West Point). Roosma was a resident of Passaic, New Jersey when he was appointed to West Point in 1954.

While at the academy, Roosma played soccer and baseball in addition to being a member of the wrestling team. He was also a member of the German language and weightlifting clubs, chapel choir, and debate council. He graduated in 1958, and received his commission as a second lieutenant of Infantry.

== Start of career ==
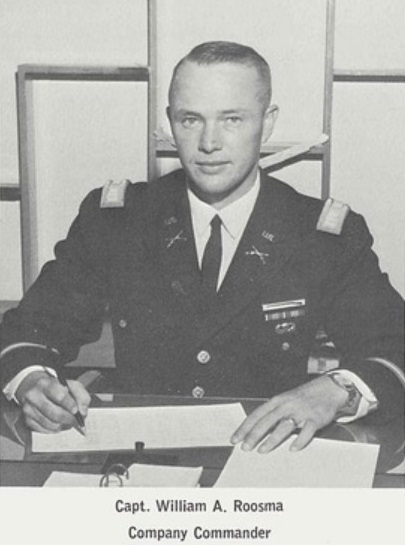
Roosma as a captain in 1966

After receiving his commission, Roosma completed the Infantry Officer Basic Course at Fort Benning, Georgia. This was followed by completion of Ranger School at Fort Benning, then Fort Benning's Airborne Course. While attending his initial training, Roosma's classmates included Colin Powell, with whom he maintained a lifelong friendship.

After his Infantry, Ranger, and Airborne training, Roosma was assigned to Company C, 1st Battle Group, 15th Infantry Regiment in Bamberg, West Germany. After returning from West Germany, Roosma was assigned as an instructor at the Ranger School. He completed the Infantry Officer Advanced Course in 1964, after which he was assigned to Fort Ord, California as commander of Headquarters and Headquarters Company, 1st Battalion, 3rd Training Brigade. From 1966 to 1967, Roosma performed Vietnam War duty with the 196th Light Infantry Brigade, first as the brigade's assistant operations officer (Assistant S-3), and later as operations officer (S-3) of the brigade's 3rd Battalion. He was promoted to major in December 1966.

== Continued career ==
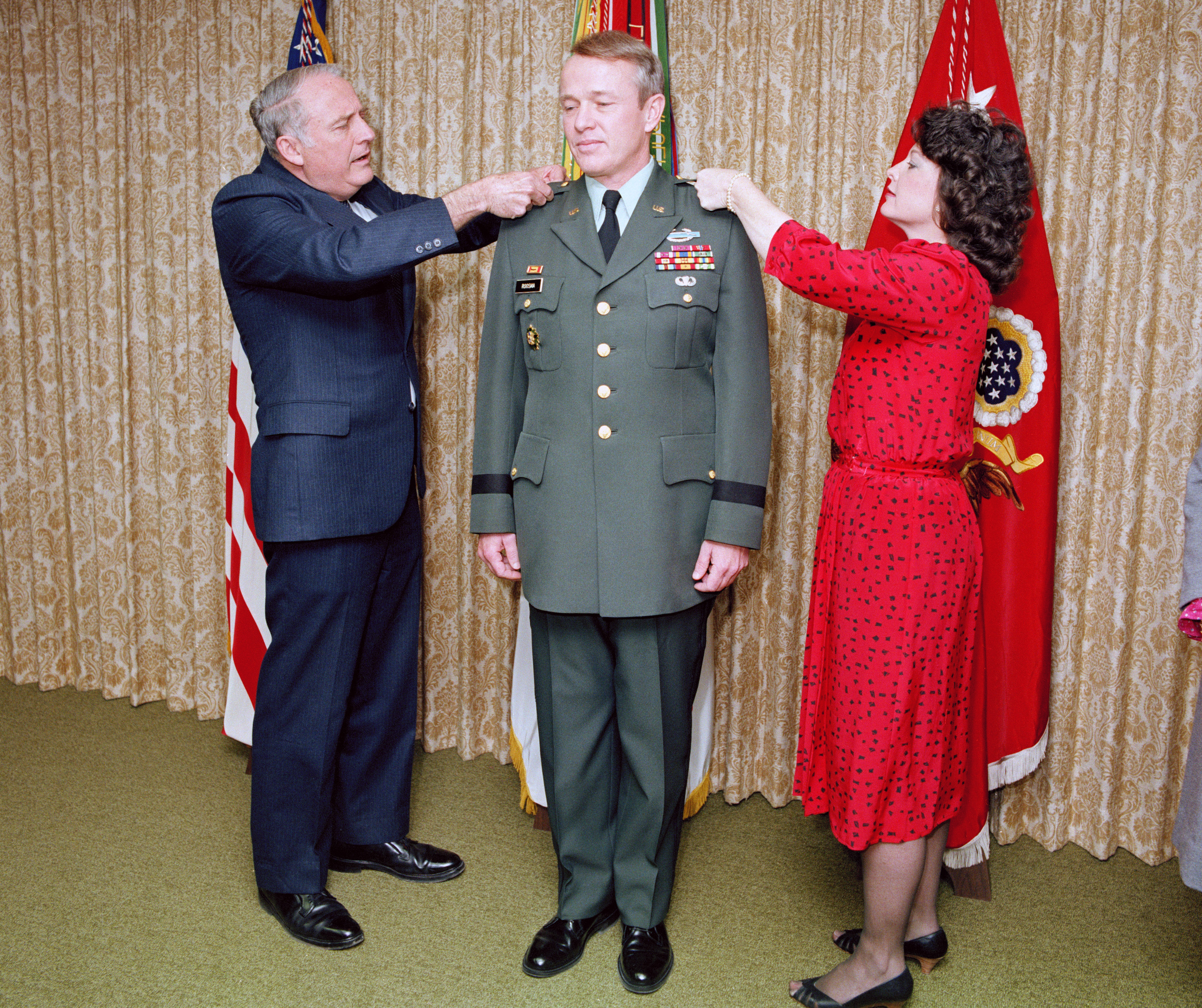
Roosma receives his brigadier general's stars from Army Secretary John O. Marsh Jr. in 1984

After returning from Vietnam, Roosma was assigned as head of the Military Science Department at Indiana's Culver Military Academy. Roosma then completed the program of instruction at the Armed Forces Staff College. He was next assigned to the staff of the Chief of Staff of the United States Army, and he was promoted to lieutenant colonel in 1973. Roosma served in Panama as commander of 4th Battalion, 10th Infantry Regiment, 193rd Infantry Brigade, then commandant of the Jungle Operations Training Center at Fort Sherman.

In 1977, Roosma graduated from the Air War College. He also completed his Master of Arts degree in Public Relations and Master of Science degree in Public Administration, both at Auburn University at Montgomery. He was subsequently assigned as inspector general of III Armored Corps at Fort Hood, Texas, followed by his 1980 selection to command 2nd Infantry Brigade, 25th Infantry Division at Schofield Barracks, Hawaii. In 1982, Roosma was assigned as executive officer in the Office of the Secretary of the Army.

== Later career ==
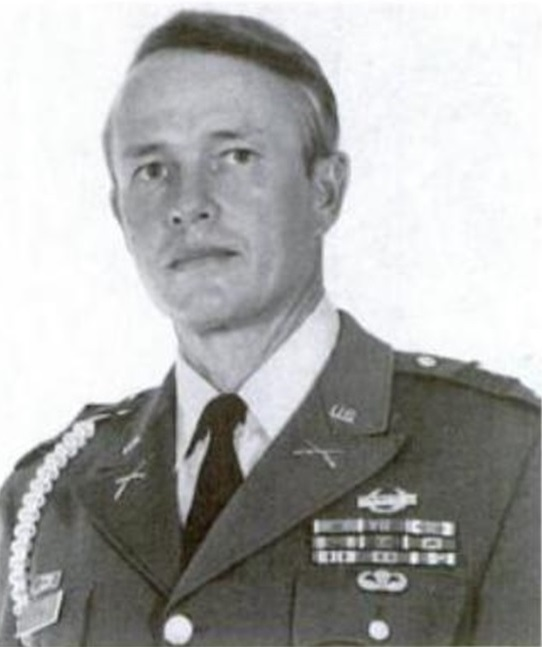
Roosma as a brigadier general in 1985

In January 1984, Roosma was promoted to brigadier general. In 1984 and 1985, he served as director of the Armed Forces Inaugural Committee that coordinated U.S. military activity that took place during the Second inauguration of Ronald Reagan. In 1985 and 1986, Roosma served as assistant division commander of the 7th Infantry Division.

After promotion to major general in 1986, Roosma was assigned as deputy commander of the XVIII Airborne Corps. In this assignment, Roosma commanded troops via an Airborne Command and Control Communications Platform during Operation Just Cause. In addition, he acted as commander of the corps in 1990 during the U.S. deployment of troops to the Middle East for Operation Desert Shield and Operation Desert Storm. He retired in June 1991.

== Retirement and death ==
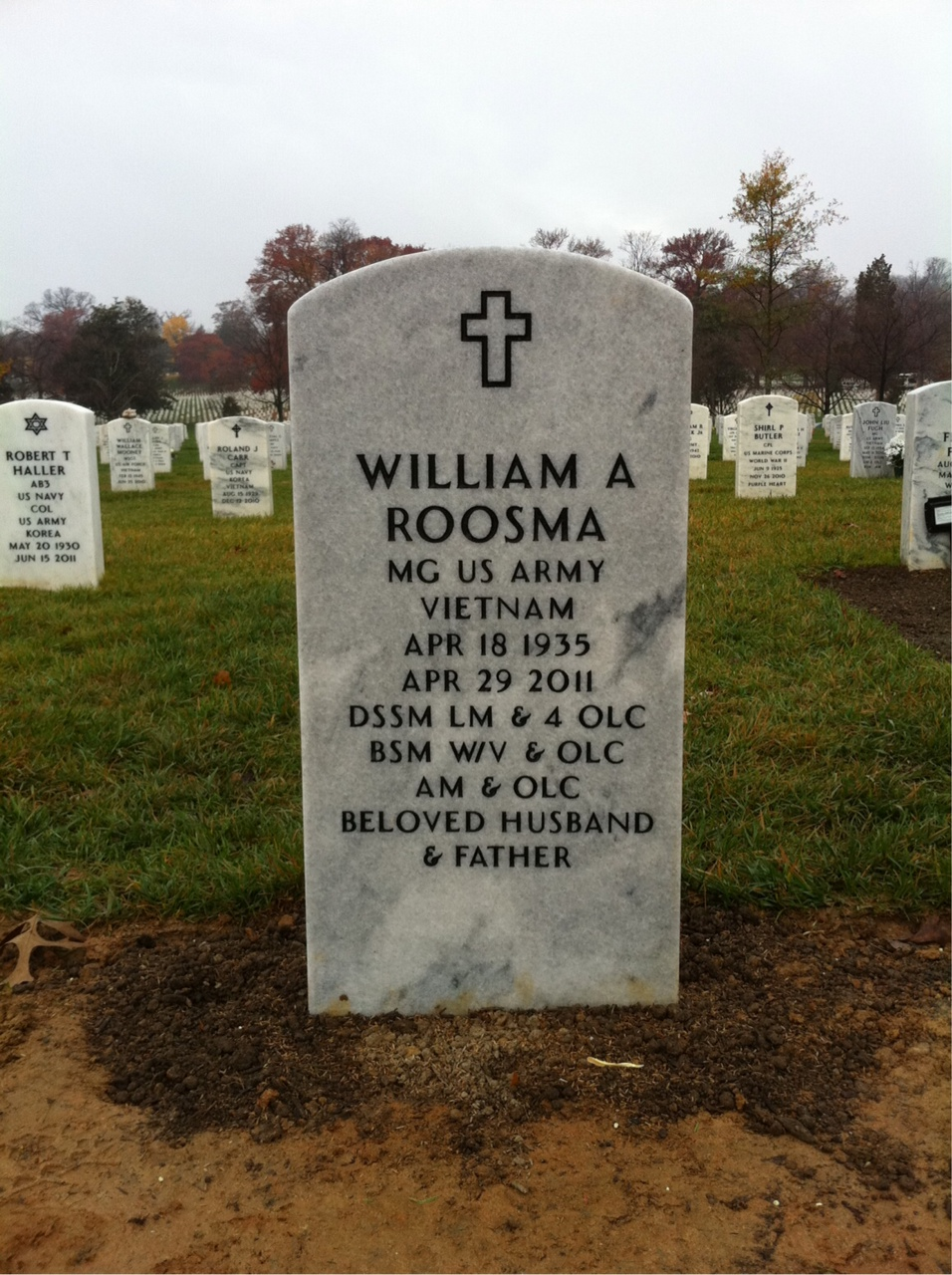
Roosma's headstone at Arlington National Cemetery

In retirement, Roosma was a resident of Fairfax Station, Virginia. Among his post-military pursuits was consulting work for corporations including McDonnell Douglas and Boeing. He died in Fairfax Station on April 29, 2011. Roosma was buried at Arlington National Cemetery.

== Awards ==
Roosma's major awards and decorations included:

- Army Distinguished Service Medal
- Defense Superior Service Medal
- Legion of Merit with 4 oak leaf clusters
- Bronze Star Medal with "V" device and oak leaf cluster
- Meritorious Service Medal with three oak leaf clusters
- Air Medal with oak leaf cluster
- Army Commendation Medal with two oak leaf clusters

In addition, Roosma received the following qualification badges and tabs:

- Combat Infantryman Badge
- Expert Infantryman Badge
- Parachutist Badge
- Ranger tab
- Army Staff Identification Badge

== Family ==
In 1962, Roosma married Sandra Youmans of Estill, South Carolina. They were the parents of two children, Tracey and Kelsey.

Roosma's siblings included an older brother, John S. Roosma (1929–2020), who was a career officer in the United States Air Force and retired as a colonel. In addition, Roosma had a fraternal twin, Garret, who was also a member of the West Point class of 1958. Garret Roosma served in the U.S. Army and Army Reserve, and retired as a colonel.
