= Rita Deanin Abbey =

American artist and educator (1930–2021)

- Abbey in 1976
- Born: Rita Deanin; July 20, 1930; Passaic, New Jersey, U.S.
- Died: March 20, 2021 (aged 90); Las Vegas, Nevada, U.S.
- Notable work: Wall of Creation (1970–71); Bridge Mountain (1974); Spirit Tower (1993)
- Movement: Abstract Expressionism
- Spouses: Edward Abbey (m. 1952; div. 1965) Dr. Robert R. Belliveau (m. 1985)
- Website: ritadeaninabbeymuseum.org

Rita Deanin Abbey (July 20, 1930 – March 20, 2021) was a multidisciplinary abstract artist and among the first art professors at the University of Nevada, Las Vegas (UNLV). Born in New Jersey to Polish immigrants, she moved to Las Vegas, Nevada, in 1965 to teach, living there for 56 years and contributing several large-scale public artworks. She was an artist-in-residence at the studios of many artists and institutions, had over 60 individual exhibitions, and participated in over 160 national and international group exhibitions.

Abbey was known for her many and various uses of media, including painting, drawing, printmaking, sculpture, porcelain enamel fired on steel, stained glass, and computer art. A year after her death, the Rita Deanin Abbey Art Museum opened in Las Vegas. The museum displays her outdoor sculptures and a selection of her extensive body of work.

== Early life and education ==
Rita Deanin was born in 1930 in Passaic, New Jersey and graduated from Passaic High School in 1948, where she was voted "most talented" by her fellow graduates. She studied at Goddard College in Vermont from 1948 to 1950 before moving to Albuquerque, New Mexico, to receive a Bachelor of Fine Arts degree in 1952 and a Master of Arts degree in 1954 from the University of New Mexico, Albuquerque. In the summers of 1952 and 1954, she studied under Hans Hofmann at the Hans Hofmann School of Fine Arts in Massachusetts.

== Style and influences ==
While living in Albuquerque, Abbey developed a strong affinity for the landscape of the American Southwest. The desert became a primary influence in her work.

Abbey took inspiration from various aspects of nature to augment her creative process. In developing her individual theory of perception, she learned "how to see what is out there." Abbey's emotional responses to the natural environment were recorded in highly expressive works. She studied the line, pattern, color, space, light, form, and texture of geological formations and recreated the spirit and essence of the desert in abstract compositions. In a review for "Dance Eternal", Las Vegas local arts administrator Dan Skea wrote the piece "demonstrates Abbey's excellence as a draftsman. Her line, always bold and rhythmic, is bursting with supple eloquence"

Abbey wrote and published poetry, welded, and learned a number of obscure crafts as well as traditional art media, influenced by a desire to "conquer every medium."

== Notable work ==
Wall of Creation, 1970–71, 20 ft × 40 ft (6 m × 12 m), polyester resin and fiberglass

=== Public art ===
Abbey's works on display around Las Vegas include stained glass windows and large-scale sculptures, as well as a bust of Flora Dungan in the Humanities building at UNLV and a plexiglass mural in a University Medical Center building.

In 1971 Abbey completed Wall of Creation, a 20-by-40-foot (6.1 m × 12.2 m) mural made of polyester resin and fiberglass, for Temple Beth Sholom in Las Vegas. The rear-illuminated, translucent mural consists of twenty-three panels and uses the Menorah, a Judaic symbol of enlightenment, as the basis for its shape. When Temple Beth Sholom moved in 2000, Abbey was again commissioned to design a 16-piece series of stained glass windows for the main sanctuary of the new temple. The series, titled "Isaiah Stained Glass Windows", was later published by Abbey as a book of prints. Wall of Creation was preserved from the original temple and is currently on display in the Rita Deanin Abbey Art Museum.

The Las Vegas–Clark County Library District commissioned Abbey in 1993 to create a sculpture for the Summerlin Library and Performing Arts Center, Spirit Tower. At 20 feet (6.1 m) tall and weighing over 10 tons (9 t), Spirit Tower became Abbey's largest-ever sculpture. In designing it, Abbey aimed to emulate the mountains visible on the horizon in Summerlin.

Due to its size and location at a public library, Spirit Tower has become Abbey's most locally well-recognized piece. In an early 2020 poll, Nevada Public Radio named Spirit Tower as among the best public art off of the Strip.

=== Paintings ===
Abbey's painting Dawn at Arches (1957) is mentioned in her first husband's novel The Brave Cowboy and appears in the background of the film adaptation starring Kirk Douglas.

Rita Deanin Abbey working on Bridge Mountain, a 10 ft × 30 ft (3 m × 9 m) mural

Bridge Mountain (1974), a five-panel, 10-by-30-foot (3.0 m × 9.1 m) mural was on display in the lobby of The Judy Bayley Theatre at UNLV for 20 years. Abbey intended the piece to evoke the motion of the female figure and the notion of recurring rhythmic cycles. After the painting was reported to have been damaged, Abbey requested its return to her collection. The mural is now on permanent display in the Rita Deanin Abbey Art Museum.

== Awards and exhibitions ==
In 1986, Abbey received the Governor's Seventh Annual Visual Arts Award for the State of Nevada. After her nearly five decades of working in Las Vegas, the City of Las Vegas Office of Cultural Affairs Las Vegas Arts Commission awarded her a Lifetime Achievement Award for Excellence in the Arts in 2012.

Other awards include

- Ueno Royal Museum, Tokyo, Japan, International Exhibition of Enameling Art in Japan prize award, 1987
- Citizen Alert: Environmental Artist of the Year Award Las Vegas, May 7, 1993
- Women's History Month: Recognized for her contributions to the Arts by the Mayor and Members of the Las Vegas City Council, Las Vegas, March 2008
- University of Las Vegas, College of Fine Art, Las Vegas, NV, 20th Annual College of Fine Arts Hall of Fame Award, April 3, 2024

=== Rita Deanin Abbey 35 Year Retrospective ===
The Palm Springs Desert Museum (now Palm Springs Art Museum) has four of her works in its permanent collection, and also commissioned a limited print edition by Abbey, "Spirit Mover" (1987), for its 60th anniversary.

In 1988, the University of Nevada, Las Vegas, Marjorie Barrick Museum, and the Palm Springs Desert Museum collaborated to present the "Rita Deanin Abbey 35 Year Retrospective," a 20-piece exhibition held for five months at UNLV in February to March and the Palm Springs Desert Museum in March through June.

== Personal life ==
In 1952, Deanin married environmental author Edward Abbey. They had two children, Joshua, and Aaron Paul Abbey. The couple divorced after 13 years.

Abbey moved to Las Vegas in 1965 and was hired as a teacher at Nevada Southern University. When Nevada Southern University became the University of Nevada, Las Vegas (UNLV) in 1969, Abbey was the only female faculty member in the art department. She taught drawing, painting, and color theory classes and developed interdisciplinary classes with the science department. She retired and became a professor emeritus of art in 1987 after 22 years of teaching. She married pathologist Dr. Robert R. Belliveau in 1985.

== Legacy ==
My energies have always gone into making art rather than promoting it.

— Abbey on avoiding publicity

Abbey limited her exposure to the public during her lifetime. In 2011, The Las Vegas Sun described Abbey as a "Somewhat reclusive artist who has spent decades creating a massive collection of sculptures—unseen by all but a lucky few." In The Las Vegas Review-Journal's obituary, Clark County cultural observer Patrick Gaffey called her "the most important unknown artist in Southern Nevada." The Las Vegas Clark County Library District acknowledged her death online and stated their Spirit Tower as an example of her "impressive legacy."

=== The Rita Deanin Abbey Art Museum ===
Rita Deanin Abbey Art Museum
- Former name: Desert Space Museum
- Established: 2022
- Location: 5850 North Park Street, Las Vegas, Nevada, United States
- Coordinates: 36.267359°N 115.302287°W
- Type: Art museum
- Director: Laura Sanders
- Curator: Katherine Hough
- Website: ritadeaninabbeymuseum.org

In the final years of her life, Abbey oversaw the construction of a museum on her property in the (then-undeveloped) northwest area of Las Vegas called Desert Space. The 10,500 square feet (980 m^{2}) facility was built on a 10-acre (4.0 ha) plot using her designs and specifications. Following her death in 2021, the non-profit Robert Bealleveau and Rita Deanin Abbey Foundation completed Desert Space and renamed it the Rita Deanin Abbey Art Museum. The museum opened to the public in 2022. Abbey's home and studio are also on the property but not open to the public.

==== History ====
Abbey planned to build a gallery on her property from as early as 2000. The area northwest of the Las Vegas metropolitan area was largely undeveloped during her lifetime, leaving the desert mountains in plain view and contributing to her association with the western aesthetic. Construction began in 2011 under the name Desert Space Museum. In addition to designing the architecture, Abbey personally arranged the floor tiling of the museum, and crafted the museum's doors.

Former Palm Spring Art Museum director Katherine Hough joined as the museum's curator during construction, originally as co-curator with Abbey. Laura Sanders, Abbey's archivist from 1990 to 2006, joined as museum director in 2022.

The museum displays a curated selection of works by Abbey from a collection of over 4,000 artworks. It includes paintings, porcelain enamels on steel, drawings, assemblages, prints, carved wood, cut Plexiglass, and outdoor sculptures. Several of the 12 rooms in the gallery focus only on a single series or period of art. In explaining the museum's potential, Hough called it "the reintroduction of a serious, one-of-a-kind artist who spent so many productive years off the grid. She hasn't really been discovered... And this will be discovered."

== Publications ==
- Abbey, Rita Deanin (1977). Rivertrip. Flagstaff, AZ: Northland Press. ISBN 9780873581523.
- Fiero, G. William; Abbey, Rita Deanin (1986). Art and Geology: Expressive Aspects of the Desert. Layton, UT: Peregrine Smith Books, Inc. ISBN 9780879052010.
- Abbey Deanin, Rita (1996). Rio Grande Series. Las Vegas, NV: Gan Or. ISBN 9780965287005.
- Abbey, Rita Deanin (2000). In Praise of Bristlecone Pines: A hand-printed artist's book of twenty-four engravings and a narrative poem. Johannesburg (presently White River), South Africa: The Artists' Press. ISBN 9780620253482.
- Abbey, Rita Deanin (2002). Isaiah Stained-Glass Windows. Las Vegas, NV: Gan Or. ISBN 9780965287012.
- Abbey, Rita Deanin (2013). Seeds Yet Ever Secret: Poems and Images. Las Vegas, NV: Gan Or. ISBN 9780965287029.
