= Ron Mikolajczyk =

American football player (born 1950)

No. 62
- Position: Offensive tackle

Personal information
- Born: June 2, 1950 (age 76); Passaic, New Jersey, U.S.
- Listed height: 6 ft 3 in (1.91 m)
- Listed weight: 275 lb (125 kg)

Career information
- High school: Passaic (NJ)
- College: Marshall; Tampa
- NFL draft: 1973: 5th round, 127th overall pick

Career history
- Toronto Argonauts (1972–1973); Memphis Southmen (1974–1975); New York Giants (1976–1979); Tampa Bay Bandits (1983); Memphis Showboats (1984–1985); Orlando Renegades (1985)

Awards and highlights
- First-team Little All-American (1971)

Career NFL statistics
- Games played: 32
- Games started: 26
- Fumble recoveries: 1
- Stats at Pro Football Reference

Ronald K. Mikolajczyk (born June 2, 1950) is an American former professional football offensive tackle and retired professional wrestler. He attended the University of Tampa, graduating in 1971.

Mikolajczyk grew up in Passaic, New Jersey where he attended Passaic High School.

== Career ==
Mikolajczyk began his professional career in 1972, with the Toronto Argonauts of the Canadian Football League. He was subsequently drafted in the fifth round of the National Football League's 1973 player draft by the Oakland Raiders. He ended up playing the 1973 season with the Argonauts, and was released after that year.

Mikolajczyk then played the 1974 and 1975 seasons in the World Football League, with the Memphis Southmen.

In 1976, he joined the NFL's New York Giants, playing for four seasons.

After four years out of football, he joined the United States Football League, playing for the Tampa Bay Bandits, Memphis Showboats and Orlando Renegades.

During off season, and during his four-year break from football, Mikolajczyk was a professional wrestler, entering the business due to his friendship with Jerry Lawler.

== See also ==
- List of gridiron football players who became professional wrestlers
