= Amod Field =

American gridiron football player and coach (born 1967)

No. 81, 6
- Positions: Wide receiver, defensive back

Personal information
- Born: October 11, 1967 (age 59); Passaic, New Jersey, U.S.
- Listed height: 5 ft 11 in (1.80 m)
- Listed weight: 186 lb (84 kg)

Career information
- High school: Passaic (New Jersey)
- College: Montclair State (1985–1989)
- NFL draft: 1990: undrafted

Career history

Playing
- Phoenix Cardinals (1990–1991); San Diego Chargers (1992)*; BC Lions (1992); Tampa Bay Storm (1993); Massachusetts Marauders (1994); San Jose SaberCats (1995–1996); Orlando Predators (1996); Connecticut Coyotes (1996); New York CityHawks (1997); New Jersey Red Dogs (1997)
- * Offseason or practice squad member only

Coaching
- Montclair State Red Hawks (1996–1998) Assistant; New Jersey Red Dogs (1999–2000) Assistant

Awards and highlights
- ArenaBowl champion (1993); Second-team All-Arena (1995)

Career AFL statistics
- Receptions: 113
- Receiving yards: 1,325
- Receiving TDs: 18
- Tackles: 63.5
- Interceptions: 3
- Stats at ArenaFan.com
- Stats at Pro Football Reference

Amod Lloyd Field (born October 11, 1967) is an American former professional football player who played one season with the Phoenix Cardinals of the National Football League (NFL). He played college football at Montclair State University. He also played in the Canadian Football League for the BC Lions and in the Arena Football League (AFL) for the Tampa Bay Storm, Massachusetts Marauders, San Jose SaberCats, Orlando Predators, Connecticut Coyotes, New York CityHawks and New Jersey Red Dogs.

== Early life ==
Amod Lloyd Field was born on October 11, 1967, in Passaic, New Jersey. He attended Passaic High School in Passaic.

== College career ==
Field was a member of the Montclair State Red Hawks football team from 1985 to 1989. He caught 108 passes for 1,941 yards and 24 touchdowns during his college career. He also participated in track and field at Montclair State. He won the outdoor NCAA Division III title in the 400 meter hurdles twice and was a Division III track and field All-American eight times. Field played one year of basketball as well, leading the team in points per game with 15.4 and also averaging nearly five rebounds per game. He was inducted into the Montclair State Athletics Hall of Fame in 2000.

== Professional career ==
After going undrafted in the 1990 NFL draft, Field signed with the Phoenix Cardinals on April 30, 1990. He was released on September 3, signed to the Cardinals' practice squad on October 2, released again on October 10, and signed to the practice squad again on October 16. He was promoted to the active roster on December 5, 1990, but did not appear in any games for the team during the 1990 season. Field became a free agent after the season and re-signed with the Cardinals. He was released on August 26, 1991, but re-signed the next day. He played in two games for the Cardinals during the 1991 season before being released on September 18, 1991. He was listed as a wide receiver while with the Cardinals.

Field was signed by the San Diego Chargers on April 10, 1992. He was released on May 7, 1992.

He played in nine games for the BC Lions of the Canadian Football League in 1992, totaling three receptions for 55 yards, two interceptions, 33 kick returns for 672 yards, five punt returns for 25 yards, nine defensive tackles, and three special teams tackles. He was listed as a defensive back while with the Lions.

Field appeared in three games for the Tampa Bay Storm of the Arena Football League (AFL) in 1993, catching seven passes for 122 yards and two touchdowns. On August 21, 1993, the Storm beat the Detroit Drive in ArenaBowl VII.

He played in 11 games for the Massachusetts Marauders of the AFL in 1994, recording 30 receptions for 358 yards and two touchdowns, 23 solo tackles, six assisted tackles, two pass breakups, and one fumble recovery. He played both offense and defense during his time in the AFL as the league played under ironman rules.

Field appeared in nine games for the AFL's San Jose SaberCats in 1995, accumulating 24 catches for 305 yards and eight touchdowns, 16 solo tackles, one assisted tackle, two interceptions, and two pass breakups. He earned second-team All-Arena honors that season as a wide receiver/defensive back. He played in two games for the SaberCats during the 1996 season, catching nine passes for 101 yards and posting one solo tackle.

On June 7, 1996, Field and Chris Barber were traded to the Orlando Predators for Ben Bennett. Field played in three games for the Predators in 1996, totaling nine receptions for 69 yards and one touchdown, and seven rushing attempts for 37 yards and two touchdowns.

Field later appeared in two games for the Connecticut Coyotes of the AFL in 1996 as well, recording three catches for 32 yards, two solo tackles, two assisted tackles, and two kick returns for 32 yards.

He played in three games for the New York CityHawks of the AFL in 1997, totaling eight receptions for 106 yards and two touchdowns, three solo tackles, and two kick returns for 25 yards.

In June 1997, Field and Craig Taylor were traded to the New Jersey Red Dogs for Patrick Jackson and Franklin Stephens. Field played in nine games for the Red Dogs during the 1997 season, accumulating 23 receptions for 232 yards and three touchdowns, 12 solo tackles, four assisted tackles, one sack, one interception, three pass breakups, and one fumble recovery.

== Coaching career ==
Field was an assistant coach for the Montclair State Red Hawks from 1996 to 1998 and for the New Jersey Red Dogs from 1999 to 2000.

== Personal life ==
Field's son Da'Mon Merkerson also spent time with the Cardinals and in the AFL.
