= Edith E. Sproul =

American physician

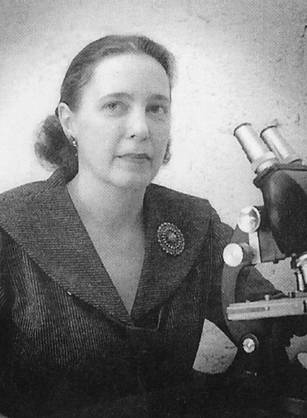
- Born: October 17, 1907; Passaic, New Jersey
- Died: January 19, 1999 (aged 91)
- Education: Barnard College; Columbia University
- Known for: Development of the pap smear test
- Medical career
- Profession: Pathologist
- Institutions: Columbia University; American University of Beirut; Roswell Park Comprehensive Cancer Center

Edith E. Sproul, M.D. (October 17, 1907 – January 19, 1999) was an American pathologist whose work with Georgios Papanikolaou of the Cornell University Medical School in New York led to the development of the pap smear. Sproul described the relationship between thrombophlebitis and pancreatic cancer and characteristics of early prostatic cancer.

== Life and career ==
Edith E. Sproul was born in 1907 in Passaic, New Jersey. She graduated from Barnard College of Columbia University in 1927, followed by Columbia's College of Physicians and Surgeons in 1931. After a two-year internship at Strong Memorial Hospital in Rochester, New York and a residency in pathology at Presbyterian Hospital, Sproul returned to Columbia as instructor in pathology at the College of Physicians and Surgeons. She remained at Columbia for twelve years and was promoted to the position of associate professor before her departure in 1946. She then moved to the American University of Beirut in Lebanon, where she was appointed full professor and served as acting chair of the department of pathology.

Sproul returned to Columbia in 1950 and was offered a full professorship in 1961. However, she left the university to join her husband, Arnold Mittelman, M.D. at Roswell Park Comprehensive Cancer Center in Buffalo, New York. Here, she served as Associate Chief of Cancer Research and, in 1969, was appointed chair of the department of experimental pathology and Clinical Professor of Pathology.

After her death in 1999, her former student from the American University of Beirut, Dr. Henry A. Azar, wrote, "She was for most of us the first and only woman-teacher or woman-in-authority we knew until then, and she was dazzlingly brilliant. Ours seemed, on the surface, a male-dominated world. . . she undoubtedly was a pioneer in a daring and noble form of feminism."

== Publications ==
The following is a partial list of publications by Sproul:

- Sproul, E.E. (1980) Acid phosphatase and prostate cancer: historical overview. The Prostate, 1(4), 411–413.
- Sproul, E.E. (1973) Projected multidisciplinary lymphoma study group. Journal of Surgical Oncology, 5(6), 581–582.
- Sproul, E.E. (1963) Wegener's and Lethal Midline Granulomatosis. JAMA: The Journal of the American Medical Association, 177(13), 921–922.
- Hudson, P.B., Sanger, G., Sproul E.E. (1959) Effective system of bactericidal conditioning for hospitals. Journal of the American Medical Association, 169(14), 1549–1556.
- Bickerman, H.A., Sproul, E.E., Barach, A.L. (1959) Effective system of bactericidal conditioning for hospitals. Diseases of the Chest, 33(4), 347.
- Fiala, A., Fiala, S., Sproul, E.E. (1956) The Action of Corticotropin (ACTH) on Nucleic Acids and Subcellular Elements of the Adrenal Cortex. The Journal of Biophysical and Biochemical Cytology, 2(2), 115–126.
- Fiala, S., Sproul, E.E., Blutinger, M.E., Fiala, A.E. (1955) Basophilic chromidia and mitochondria in normal and in tumor tissue. The Journal of Histochemistry and Cytochemistry, 3(3), 212–226.
- Hudson, P.B., Finkle, A.L., Hopkins, J.A., Sproul, E.E., Stout, A.P. (1954) Prostatic cancer. XI. Early prostatic cancer diagnosed by arbitrary open perineal biopsy among 300 unselected patients. Cancer, 7(4), 690–703.
- Hudson, P.B., Finkle, A.L., Trifilio, A., Jost, H.M., Sproul E.E., Stout, A.P., (1954) Prostatic Cancer: VII. Detection of unsuspected adeno carcinoma in the aging male population. The Journal of the American Medical Association, 155(5), 426–429.
- Lattes, R., McDonald, J.J., Sproul, E.E. (1954) Non-chromaffin paraganglioma, of carotid body and orbit; report of a case. Annals of surgery, 139(3), 382–384.
- Lenz, M., Sproul, E.E. (1934) Carcinoma of the tongue with generalized metastases. The American Journal of Surgery, 25(1), 102–106.
