= Hezekiah Griggs =

Hezekiah Griggs III
- Born: October 27, 1988; Passaic, New Jersey, U.S.
- Died: December 22, 2016 (aged 28); Jacksonville, Florida, U.S.
- Occupations: Entrepreneur; Investor

Hezekiah Griggs III (October 27, 1988 – December 22, 2016) was an American entrepreneur, philanthropist, and investor. He was the founder and managing partner of H360Capital, an early-stage venture capital firm, making him the youngest African-American venture capitalist at the time. He was also a college lecturer and motivational speaker.

In 2011, Griggs was recognized by the White House for his philanthropy and public-private partnerships with urban communities. He was named a "Legend in the Making" at the 55th anniversary of the Montgomery bus boycott.

Griggs died at age 28 in a car accident.

== Early life ==
Griggs was born and raised in Passaic, New Jersey. He attended and played sports at Passaic High School. He grew up in a single-parent household while facing the conflicts of inner-city poverty. He often attributed his humble beginnings as a major factor in his entrepreneurial mindset.

By age 12, Griggs had started several small businesses. He started publishing magazines shortly before attending high school. He has been referred to as "America's Youngest Media Mogul," after developing an umbrella corporation, HG3media, that published several free magazines for teens. Although Griggs had a lot of success as a teenager, he also experienced business failures. In an interview with Black Enterprise magazine, he asserted, "Failure is valuable," and continued creating businesses until his early twenties.

== H360 Capital ==
Griggs founded H360capital after noticing the plight of minority (specifically African-American) entrepreneurs seeking funding. In his role as managing partner, he led the partner operations and investment strategy of the firm. The firm committed to raising a $100 million fund when Griggs officially announced its launch. Griggs also led a multimillion-dollar public-private partnership initiative launched by the firm with urban cities and public institutions.

== Other projects ==
Griggs was the Chief Ambassador for Ambassadors for Leadership an organization that he founded to help train, develop, and mentor youth. The organization actively engages youth in urban cities, with Griggs participating in anti-violence initiatives and public events.

Griggs was one of 20 entrepreneurs featured in the cult entrepreneur-focused documentary, The Y.E.S. Movie. A prominent African-American businessman, Griggs was often rumored to be associated with many major projects and initiatives in the African-American community.

Griggs was a major proponent for mentorship as he actively mentored athletes, celebrities, and youth.

Griggs participated in a panel discussion with Ralph Nader and Cornel West.

In 2012, Griggs served as a judge in the NYC Pitchfest.

== Death ==
Griggs was killed on Thursday, December 22, 2016, in an early morning accident on Interstate 95 in Jacksonville, Florida. A crash report said he died when his Mercedes was hit by a tractor-trailer about 12:30 a.m. His car was parked in the safety zone between the right lane of the interstate and the exit ramp to Old St. Augustine Road. The driver of the tractor trailer told state troopers he was in the exit lane but tried to merge onto the interstate when he hit the rear of Griggs' car. Griggs died at the scene.
