= Da'Mon Merkerson =

American football player (born 1989)

No. 9, 29
- Position: Cornerback

Personal information
- Born: April 5, 1989 (age 37); New Jersey, U.S.
- Listed height: 6 ft 1 in (1.85 m)
- Listed weight: 195 lb (88 kg)

Career information
- High school: Rutherford (NJ) St. Mary
- College: Syracuse
- NFL draft: 2011: undrafted

Career history
- Arizona Cardinals (2011)*; Arizona Rattlers (2012–2014)
- * Offseason or practice squad member only

Awards and highlights
- 2× ArenaBowl champion (2012, 2013)

Career AFL statistics
- Tackles: 14
- Interceptions: 1
- Pass breakups: 3
- Stats at ArenaFan.com

Da’Mon Teshone Merkerson (born April 5, 1989) is an American former football cornerback. He was signed by the Arizona Cardinals as an undrafted free agent in 2011. He played college football at Syracuse University.

== Early life ==
Merkerson grew up in Passaic, New Jersey and attended St. Mary High School in Rutherford, where he was a three-sport athlete. He played football, basketball and track. He was All county in football and track and field (400 Meter Dash). After switching back from wide receiver to cornerback in his senior season he found a home at cornerback. Tied for 8th in the Big East with passes defended. Merkerson helped lead the orange to victory against Kansas State in the Inaugural New Era Pinstripe Bowl.

== Professional career ==
=== Arizona Cardinals ===
Merkerson signed with the Arizona Cardinals in July 2011, but he was released just 3 days later.

=== Arizona Rattlers ===
From 2012 to 2014, Merkerson had been a member of the Arizona Rattlers of the Arena Football League (AFL), helping the team win back-to-back ArenaBowl Championships.

== Personal life ==
Merkerson's father Amod Field also spent time with the Cardinals and in the AFL.
