= FUJIFILM Sonosite =

FUJIFILM Sonosite, Inc. ("Fujifilm Sonosite") is a US medical device company headquartered in Bothell, Washington, that develops and manufactures point-of-care ultrasound (POCUS) systems, ultrasound transducers, and related imaging technologies. The company is a wholly owned subsidiary of Fujifilm Holdings Corporation.

== History ==
Founded in 1998 as SonoSite, Inc., the company was to commercialize portable ultrasound systems based on technology originally developed through DARPA-funded research conducted by parent company ATL Ultrasound. SonoSite became one of the pioneers of point-of-care ultrasound, helping expand the use of ultrasound imaging beyond traditional radiology departments and into emergency medicine, critical care, anesthesiology, and other bedside clinical applications. The company developed portable ultrasound systems designed for use at the patient's bedside and contributed to the growth of point-of-care ultrasound across a variety of medical specialties.

In December 2011, FUJIFILM Holdings announced an agreement to acquire SonoSite for approximately $995 million. The acquisition was completed in March 2012, making SonoSite a wholly owned subsidiary of Fujifilm.

== Products and Technology ==
Fujifilm Sonosite develops point-of-care ultrasound (POCUS) systems, ultrasound transducers, software, and related technologies used for diagnostic imaging and ultrasound-guided procedures. Its products are designed for use in emergency medicine, anesthesiology, critical care, vascular access, musculoskeletal medicine, perioperative care, and other clinical specialties.

Since its founding, the company has introduced several generations of portable ultrasound machines, including the Titan, MicroMaxx, M-Turbo, Edge, X-Porte, SII, and PX systems. These systems were developed to enable diagnostic imaging at the patient's bedside and have supported the expansion of point-of-care ultrasound across emergency medicine, anesthesia, critical care, and procedural guidance. In 2017, the company introduced the SonoSite SII, a portable ultrasound platform featuring its DirectClear transducer technology, while continuing development of the X-Porte platform. In 2020, Fujifilm Sonosite launched the Sonosite PX, featuring a redesigned workflow, new transducer family, and improved image quality. The system received coverage from multiple independent medical imaging publications following its introduction. In 2025, the company introduced PIV Assist, an artificial intelligence-enabled software feature intended to assist clinicians performing ultrasound-guided peripheral intravenous (PIV) access procedures. In 2026, Fujifilm Sonosite launched Sonosite iLOOK, a compact ultrasound system developed specifically for vascular access. The system combines a wireless linear transducer with a dedicated user interface and supports arterial, venous, and peripheral intravenous examinations. The system received U.S. Food and Drug Administration 510(k) clearance in March 2026 and was commercially launched in July 2026.
