= George Feifer =

American journalist (1934–2019)

- Born: September 8, 1934; Paterson, New Jersey, U.S.
- Died: November 12, 2019 (aged 85); Los Angeles, California, U.S.
- Education: Passaic High School; Harvard College
- Occupations: Journalist; novelist; historian

George Feifer (September 8, 1934 – November 12, 2019) was an American journalist, novelist, and historian. Known for his autobiographical novels chronicling life in the Soviet Union, he also wrote three books on the Battle of Okinawa. His novel The Girl from Petrovka was adapted into a film starring Anthony Hopkins and Goldie Hawn.

He was born in Paterson, New Jersey, in 1934, and lived in Manhattan before moving to Passaic, New Jersey, with his mother and attending Passaic High School, where he edited the school's newspaper. He attended Harvard College.

Feifer died in Los Angeles, California, in 2019.

== Bibliography ==
- Justice in Moscow (1964)
- The Girl from Petrovka (1971)
- Moscow Farewell (1977)
- Tennozan: The Battle of Okinawa and the Atomic Bomb (1994)
- Breaking Open Japan: Commodore Perry, Lord Abe, and American Imperialism in 1853 (2006)
- The Battle of Okinawa: The Blood and the Bomb (2011)
