= Ivan Paul Kaminow =

American researcher (1930-2013)

- Born: 3 March 1930; Union City, New Jersey
- Died: 18 December 2013. San Francisco
- Education: Harvard University
- Occupation: Researcher
- Scientific career
- Fields: Electrical Engineering
- Workplaces: Bell Labs

Ivan Paul Kaminow (3 March 1930 - 18 December 2013) was an American electrical engineer and scientific researcher.

== Early life and education ==
He was born on 3 March 1930 in Union City, New Jersey. Raised in Passaic, New Jersey, he graduated in 1948 from Passaic High School.

He completed his bachelor's degree from Union College and earned his MS in electrical engineering, from University of California, Los Angeles in 1954. He completed his PhD at Harvard University, where his thesis was on ferromagnetic resonance at microwave frequencies and high pressures was supervised by C. Lester Hogan and later R. Victor Jones.

== Career ==
He retired from Bell Labs in 1996 after a 42-year long career lasting from 1954 to 1996, mostly in lightwave research.

At Bell Labs, he did seminal research on electrooptic modulators and materials, Raman scattering in ferroelectrics, integrated optics (including titanium-diffused lithium niobate modulators) and semiconductor lasers.

== Death ==
He died in San Francisco on 18 December 2013.

== Awards and honors ==
He received many awards for his contributions to photonics, including:

- 1995 Charles Hard Townes Award
- 2010 Photonics Award
- 2011 Frederic Ives Medal from the Optical Society (OSA)
- 2013 Edison Medal from the IEEE
- 1997 John Tyndall Award from IEEE/OSA.

== See also ==
- Bell Labs
- Photonics
