= Helen Lee Gruehl =

American biochemist

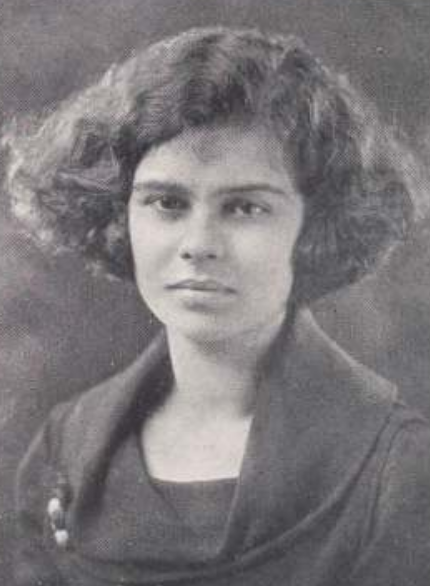
- Helen Lee Gruehl, from the 1924 yearbook of Mount Holyoke College
- Born: December 20, 1902; Passaic, New Jersey, United States
- Died: September 23, 1983 (aged 80); Concord, Massachusetts, United States
- Other names: Helen Aikman
- Occupations: Biochemist, immunologist

Helen Lee Gruehl Aikman (December 20, 1902 – September 1983) was an American immunologist.

== Early life and education ==
Gruehl was born in Passaic, New Jersey, the daughter of Edward Charles Gruehl and Susan Ramsay Mason Gruehl. Her father was manager of a rubber factory; her mother was a teacher and clubwoman. Gruehl graduated from Passaic High School in 1920, and from Mount Holyoke College in 1924. Her major was chemistry, and her minor was in mathematics; she was also known as a dancer during her college years.

== Career ==
Gruehl taught in the immunology department of Bellevue Hospital Medical College, New York University, while doing research on anaphylaxis. She co-authored over a dozen scientific articles on protein sensitivity, allergies and asthma. Her work appeared in scholarly journals including Experimental Biology and Medicine, Journal of Immunology, American Journal of Diseases of Children, Journal of Clinical Investigation, American Journal of Epidemiology, and Archives of Pediatrics and Adolescent Medicine.

== Publications ==
- "The anaphylactogenic character of horse dander and its crossed relationship to horse serum" (1925, with Bret Ratner and Holmes C. Jackson)
- "Active and passive protein sensitization in utero" (1926, with Bret Ratner and Holmes C. Jackson)
- "Transmission of protein hypersensitiveness from mother to offspring" (1927, with Bret Ratner and Holmes C. Jackson)
- "Ocular Manifestations in Anaphylaxis" (1927, with Bret Ratner and Holmes C. Jackson)
- "Respiratory Anaphylaxis: Sensitization, Shock, Bronchial Asthma, and Death Induced in the Guinea Pig by the Nasal Inhalation of Dry Horse Dander" (1927, with Bret Ratner and Holmes C. Jackson)
- "Investigations of Methods in the Study of Anaphylaxis" (1928, with Bret Ratner)
- "Is Respiratory Anaphylaxis (Asthma) the Result of a Local or General Sensitization?" (1928, with Bret Ratner)
- "Congenital Hypersensitiveness Transmitted to the Third Generation" (1929, with Bret Ratner)
- "The Sensitizing Dose in Respiratory Anaphylaxis (Asthma)" (1929, with Bret Ratner)
- "Respiratory Anaphylaxis (Asthma) and Ricin Poisoning Induced with Castor Bean Dust"
- "Identity of Animal Anaphylaxis and Human Allergy (Protein Hypersensitiveness)" (1930, with Bret Ratner)
- "Congenital Protein Hypersensitiveness in Two Generations" (1931, with Bret Ratner)
- "Passage of native proteins through the normal gastro-intestinal wall" (1934, with Bret Ratner)
- "Anaphylactogenic properties of milk: Immunochemistry of the purified proteins and antigenic changes resulting from heat and acidification" (1935, with Bret Ratner)
- "Anaphylactogenic properties of malted sugars and corn syrup" (1935, with Bret Ratner)

== Personal life ==
Gruehl married building contractor Edgerton Ladd Aikman in 1930. They had a daughter, Beverley. Her husband died in 1973, and she died in 1983, in Concord, Massachusetts, at the age of 81.
