= Ronald Durham =

- Born: L. Ronald Durham; Daytona Beach, Florida, U.S.
- Occupations: Baptist minister civil rights/social justice activist
- Years active: 1983–present

L. Ronald Durham is an American civil rights activist, pastor and a Baptist minister. He has been a pastor at First Baptist Church in Anderson, New Jersey, First Mt. Zion Baptist Church in Newark, New Jersey, and Greater Friendship Baptist Church in Daytona Beach, Florida. He also helped organize the local chapter of the local National Action Network in Daytona Beach, and has been in ministry for over fifty years.

== Early life ==
Durham was born and raised in Passaic, New Jersey, where he graduated in 1968 from Passaic High School. He began his ministry at the age of 16, having been licensed by Rev. T. H. Alexander of Union Baptist Church in Passaic.

He attended Shaw University in Raleigh, North Carolina for four years on a full scholarship provided to him by a complete stranger, graduating in 1972. He went on to Evangel Christian University in Monroe, Louisiana where he earned his Doctoral degree.

== Activism ==
He has been an activist against wrongdoings and injustices at a broader level. He met the Rev. Al Sharpton during a protest of racial profiling on the New Jersey Turnpike by the New Jersey State Police and he has been working together with Sharpton for two decades.

Durham along with Rev. Sharpton organized the rally held at Fort Mellon Park in Sanford, Florida on March 21, 2012, after the slaying of young Trayvon Martin by George Zimmerman. Working with local churches, Durham selected the park as the location after meeting with Sanford city officials. It was estimated that more than 30,000 people from all over the United States and visitors from around the world were in attendance. The demonstration was peaceful.

== President of Volusia County Democratic Black Caucus ==
Durham was elected as president of Volusia County Democratic Black Caucus. As a new president, he stated his commitment to the people that their voices would be heard. He said that Volusia County Democratic Black Caucus has been very functional in highlighting the issues of the community and he would play his part in this regard, keeping this fact in mind that community's interest would be the superior of all other interests.

Addressing the conference Durham said that voter education is necessary because without this neither the party nor the caucus will be able to address the issues like poverty, rights of women, civil rights, healthcare, and affordable housing. During his speech, he said that balance of power is necessary and it would only be possible if we succeed in educating the voters regarding the value of their votes. He further said that selection of a right candidate and reaching the millennial is more important and we need to focus on these things.

== Sports connection ==
In 1988, Durham and his wife were the hosts of the National Baseball Card Collectors Convention at the Atlantic City Convention Center in Atlantic City, New Jersey. Some of the guests included Joe DiMaggio, Pete Rose, Booby Thompson, Ralph Branca, and other baseball greats.

== Achievements ==
He started assistance programs that provide free food and clothing to anyone in need and created Friendship Academy. The academy is a childcare learning center for preschoolers that are going to gradually add kindergarten through fifth-grade classes.

Durham is the past co-chairman of the FAITH (Fighting Against Injustice Toward Harmony).
