= Fred R. Low =

American mechanical engineer

Fred R. Low (April 3, 1860 – January 22, 1936) was an American mechanical engineer, long-time editor of the journal Power, and an international figure in journalism and engineering.

Born in Chelsea, Massachusetts, Low received regular schooling until the age of 14, when it was stopped due to a severe illness. He was a self-made man, who started his career in the industry in 1874 as a clerk in the Boston office of the Western Union Telegraph Company, where he was taught telegraphing and stenography. He made it chief editor of the engineering journal Power in 1888 and served on that post for 42 years.

After serving on the city council from 1901 to 1903 and council president from 1905 to 1906, Low served as mayor of Passaic, New Jersey, in the year 1908–09. He was president of the American Society of Mechanical Engineers in 1924-25 and was awarded an honorary doctor of engineering from Rensselaer Polytechnic Institute. Low died at his home in Passaic, New Jersey, after being critically ill for several years.

== Selected publications ==
- Fred R. Low, Power Resources, Present and Prospective. 1924.
