= Bill Mokray =

American basketball statistician and historian

William G. Mokray (June 6, 1907 – March 21, 1974) was an American basketball statistician and historian.

Born and raised in Passaic, New Jersey, Mokray's love of basketball stats began while attending Passaic High School. After graduating from Rhode Island State College (now the University of Rhode Island), he worked as a public relations director first for his alma mater and, beginning from 1946, for the Boston Celtics basketball team. He founded and was the editor for The Official NBA Guide, authored the history of basketball article for the Encyclopædia Britannica and wrote a 900-page Ronald Basketball Encyclopedia. He was considered the number one authority on basketball's history and owned what was considered to be the world's largest basketball library, most of which was donated to the Basketball Hall of Fame. He was enshrined into the Basketball Hall of Fame in 1965 as a contributor.
