= Dennis Johnson (defensive tackle) =

American football player (born 1951)

No. 61, 75
- Positions: Defensive end, defensive tackle

Personal information
- Born: October 22, 1951; Passaic, New Jersey, U.S.
- Died: March 15, 1996 (aged 44)
- Listed height: 6 ft 4 in (1.93 m)
- Listed weight: 260 lb (118 kg)

Career information
- High school: Passaic (NJ)
- College: Delaware
- NFL draft: 1973: 13th round, 337th overall pick

Career history
- Washington Redskins (1974–1977); Buffalo Bills (1978); Toronto Argonauts (1979–1980)

Awards and highlights
- Delaware Sports Museum and Hall of Fame

Career NFL statistics
- Sacks: 22
- Fumble recoveries: 6
- Interceptions: 2
- Stats at Pro Football Reference

Dennis Leroy Johnson (born October 22, 1951) was an American professional football defensive lineman in the National Football League (NFL) for the Washington Redskins and Buffalo Bills. He played college football at the University of Delaware and was drafted in the thirteenth round of the 1973 NFL draft.

Johnson played high school football at Passaic High School.

The Delaware Sports Museum and Hall of Fame inducted Johnson in 2006.
