= VA New York Harbor Healthcare System =

- New York/New Jersey VA Health Care Network
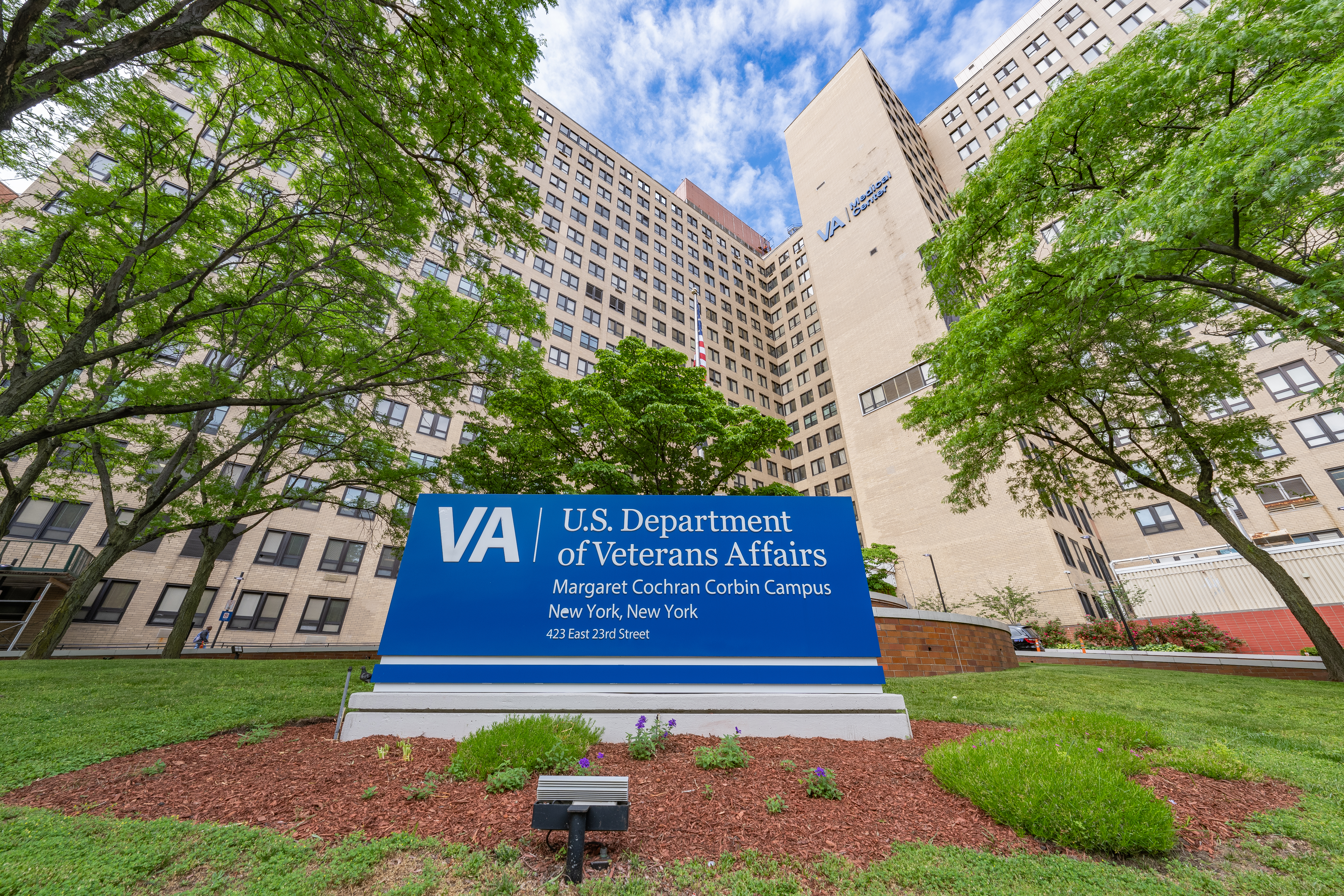
- Margaret Cochran Corbin VA Campus in Manhattan (2026)

Geography
- Location: New York City, New York, United States

Organization
- Care system: Governmental
- Type: District
- Network: New York/New Jersey VA Health Care Network

Links
- Website: www.nyharbor.va.gov
- Lists: Hospitals in New York State

The VA New York Harbor Healthcare System is a set of hospitals run by the United States Department of Veterans Affairs in the New York City area. It comprises three medical centers, two community outpatient clinics, and three veterans centers. The system is a component of the much larger VA Health Care Network.

In June 2021, the system's Manhattan Campus was renamed after Margaret Cochran Corbin, who fought in the Battle of Fort Washington during the American Revolutionary War. It was the first such facility in the United States to be named after a woman veteran. A bill to rename the facility was introduced to Congress by Senator Kirsten Gillibrand and Congresswoman Carolyn Maloney; the bill was signed into law in January 2021.

== Locations ==
The New York Harbor Healthcare System has five major locations across four of the five boroughs of New York:

- Brooklyn Medical Center, located at 800 Poly Place in Dyker Heights, Brooklyn
- Margaret Cochran Corbin Campus, located at 423 East 23rd Street in Kips Bay, Manhattan
- St. Albans Medical Center, located at 179-00 Linden Boulevard in St. Albans, Queens
- Harlem Clinic, located at 55 West 125th Street in Harlem, Manhattan
- Staten Island Community Clinic, located at 1150 South Avenue in Bloomfield, Staten Island
