= Mark Stevens (gridiron football) =

American football player (born 1962)

No. 7
- Position: Quarterback

Personal information
- Born: February 19, 1962 (age 64); Passaic, New Jersey, U.S.

Career information
- College: Utah

Career history
- Montreal Concordes / Alouettes (1985–1986); San Francisco 49ers (1987)

Career statistics
- Passing attempts: 4
- Passing completions: 2
- TD–INT: 1–0
- Passing yards: 52
- Rushing yards: 45
- Rushing touchdowns: 1
- Stats at Pro Football Reference

Career CFL statistics
- TD–INT: 4–2
- Passing yards: 484

Mark Stevens (born February 19, 1962) is an American former professional football player who was a quarterback in the National Football League (NFL) and Canadian Football League (CFL). He played college football for the Purdue Boilermakers and Utah Utes.

Stevens played in the CFL for the Montreal Concordes / Alouettes for two seasons and the NFL for the San Francisco 49ers as a replacement player during the 1987 players' strike. During the Niners' first game of the strike against the New York Giants, Stevens entered the game at halftime for starter Bob Gagliano, rushing for a touchdown and throwing for another in a 41–21 victory. In the game, head coach Bill Walsh notably operated the wishbone offense, which had become extremely rare in the NFL since the 1970's, with Stevens at the helm. Regular quarterback Joe Montana crossed the picket line to return to the team before the Niners' next game, a win over the Atlanta Falcons, though Stevens did make an appearance, rushing for nine yards in his second and final NFL game.

Raised in Passaic, New Jersey, Stevens attended Passaic High School.
