= Ernest Blood =

American basketball coach

Personal information
- Born: October 4, 1872 Manchester, New Hampshire, U.S.
- Died: February 5, 1955 (aged 82) New Smyrna Beach, Florida, U.S.
- Coaching career: 1915–1950

Career highlights
- Seven New Jersey state high school championships; Five New Jersey prep school championships; 159-game high school winning streak (1919–1925)
- Basketball Hall of Fame
- Basketball Hall of Fame

Ernest Artel Blood (October 4, 1872, Manchester, New Hampshire – February 5, 1955) was a high school and college men's basketball coach. He was best known for his "Wonder Teams" at New Jersey's Passaic High School, which lost only one game in the span of a decade and set an American high school record for most consecutive victories.

As a basketball innovator who focused on team play and a clean lifestyle in which players were prohibited from drinking or smoking, Blood emphasized the fast break, well-controlled passing and the full-court press over individual performance. Known as the "Professor", he was also a showman who would wrestle the team's bear cub mascot at halftime and could toss a 16-pound shot put into the air and catch it on the back of his neck.

Between 1915 and 1924 he coached Passaic High School to a remarkable 200–1 record, winning seven state basketball championships during his tenure, though the team's success on the court created conflict between Blood and the school's principal, Arnold D. Arnold, who thought that the team's overwhelming athletic accomplishments were distracting students from their academics. Passaic High's 1921–22 basketball team finished the season with a record of 33–0 and outscored its opponents by a margin of 2,293–612, scoring almost four times as many points as their foes did in each game. Passaic was unbeaten for more than five seasons, and won 159 consecutive games from 1919 to 1925, a feat which considered to be the longest winning streak in high school basketball history in the United States. The streak ended on February 6, 1925, after Blood had already left Passaic High, in a game the Hilltoppers lost 39–35 to the Hackensack High School Comets. The game, played at the Hackensack Armory, was said to have been designed to slow down the Passaic High fast break through the placement of sawdust on the playing surface.

Blood coached St. Benedict's Prep from 1925 to 1950 to a 421–128 record, winning five prep-school state championships during his quarter-century at the school. He briefly coached at United States Military Academy (West Point) and Potsdam Normal School (predecessor of SUNY Potsdam as well as at Clarkson Universityl.

He won a grand total of 1,200 games over the span of his 50 years in basketball, coaching YMCA, high school, prep school and college teams. In recognition of all of his accomplishments as a basketball coach, Blood was one of ten individuals inducted into the Basketball Hall of Fame in Springfield, Massachusetts with the class of 1960, the second year of the Hall's existence (in the same class with John Wooden, who was initially enshrined as a player and only later as a coach).

Blood died in New Smyrna Beach, Florida on February 5, 1955 from a cerebral hemorrhage.
