= 1987 Denver Dynamite season =

Arena Football League team season

- Owner: Sidney Shlenker
- Head coach: Tim Marcum
- Home stadium: McNichols Sports Arena

Results
- Record: 4–2
- Division place: 1st
- Playoffs: Won ArenaBowl I (Gladiators) 45–16

The 1987 Denver Dynamite season was the first season for the Denver Dynamite. Businessman and owner of the Denver Nuggets, Sidney Shlenker announced the forming of the Denver Dynamite. The franchise played in the inaugural four-team "demonstration" season of 1987. Despite the team and league's doubters, the Dynamite tied for the best record in the league with the Pittsburgh Gladiators, going 4–2. On August 1, 1987, the team participated in ArenaBowl I, which they won 45–16 over the Gladiators. The Dynamite were led on offense by quarterback Whit Taylor, and wide receiver Gary Mullen (Mullen won ArenaBowl I MVP). After winning the ArenaBowl, Head Coach Tim Marcum was named the league's first ever Coach of the Year. After leading the Dynamite to the Despite averaging the league's best attendance with over 12,000 a game, it did not return for the league's second season due to Shlenker refusing to abide by the AFL's financial rules.

== Regular season ==
=== Schedule ===
Week	Date	Opponent	Results		Game site
Week	Date	Opponent	Final score	Team record	Game site
1	June 20	at Chicago Bruisers	W 52–44 (OT)	1–0	Rosemont Horizon
2	June 27	at Washington Commandos	L 20–36	1–1	Capital Centre
3	July 3	Washington Commandos	W 73–57	2–1	McNichols Sports Arena
4	July 11	Pittsburgh Gladiators	L 32–49	2–2	McNichols Sports Arena
5	July 17	at Pittsburgh Gladiators	W 32–31	3–2	Civic Arena
6	July 24	Chicago Bruisers	W 52–35	4–2	McNichols Sports Arena

=== Standings ===
1987 Arena Football League standings
Team	W	L	T	PCT	PF	PA	PF (Avg.)	PA (Avg.)	STK
y-Pittsburgh Gladiators	4	2	0	.667	268	199	44.6	33.1	L 2
x-Denver Dynamite	4	2	0	.667	261	252	43.5	42	W 2
Washington Commandos	2	4	0	.333	288	273	48	45.5	W 1
Chicago Bruisers	2	4	0	.333	217	310	36.1	51.6	L 1

y – clinched regular-season title

x – clinched playoff spot

== Playoffs ==
Round	Date	Opponent	Results		Game site
Round	Date	Opponent	Final score	Team record	Game site
ArenaBowl I	August 1	at Pittsburgh Gladiators	W 45–16	1–0	Civic Arena

== Roster ==
1987 Denver Dynamite roster
Quarterbacks: 2 Stuart Mitchell; 10 Marty Mornhinweg; -- Whit Taylor; Wide Receivers/Defensive Backs: 21 William Cotman; 1 Gary Mullen; -- Richard Rodgers; -- Clyde Skipper; 40 Steve Trimble	Running Backs/Linebackers: 26 Chris Brewer; -- Rob DeVita; 34 Richard Prather; -- Durell Taylor; Offensive Linemen/Defensive Linemen: 50 Patrick Cain; -- Phil Forte; 60 Chuck Harris; -- Kelly Kirchbaum; -- Jon Norris; 82 Keith Smith	Wide Receivers/Linebackers: 20 Larry Friday; Kickers: -- Marty Coyne; -- Lazlo Mike-Mayer; -- Marco Morales; Rookies in italics Roster updated February 1, 2013; 22 Active, 0 Inactive, 0 PS → More rosters

== Stats ==
=== Offense ===
==== Quarterback ====
Player	Comp.	Att.	Comp%	Yards	TD's	INT's	Rating
Whit Taylor	76	138	55.1	1050	21	8	93.6
Stuart Mitchell	30	74	40.5	419	7	2	71.8
Marty Mornhinweg	3	4	75	30	0	0	95.8

==== Running backs ====
Player	Car.	Yards	TD's
Chris Brewer	12	56	1
Durell Taylor	8	39	0
Stuart Mitchell	13	34	3
Whit Taylor	11	23	1
Richard Prather	6	23	2
Marty Mornhinweg	1	9	0
Steve Trimble	1	−3	0

==== Wide receivers ====
Player	Rec.	Yards	TD's
Gary Mullen	26	502	11
Durell Taylor	25	283	6
Chris Brewer	21	255	4
Steve Trimble	20	340	5
Richard Prather	8	65	1
Richard Rodgers	7	49	1
William Cotman	1	7	0
Whit Taylor	1	−2	0

=== Defense ===
Player	Tackles	Solo	Assisted	Sack	INT	Yards	TD's
William Cotman	26.5	24	5	0	1	10	0
Keith Smith	23	22	2	5	0	0	0
Gary Mullen	21	20	2	0	2	23	0
Steve Trimble	19	17	4	0	1	0	0
Richard Prather	16	15	2	0	0	0	0
Rob DeVita	12.5	9	7	6	0	0	0
Clyde Skipper	12	12	0	0	2	10	0
Chris Brewer	12	9	6	0	0	0	0
Kelly Kirchbaum	11	9	4	0	0	0	0
Chuck Harris	9	6	6	3	0	0	0
Patrick Cain	7	7	0	3	0	0	0
Richard Rodgers	6.5	5	3	0	2	23	0
Larry Friday	6.5	6	1	0	0	0	0
Jon Norris	5	4	2	2	0	0	0
Phil Forte	3	3	0	1	0	0	0
Durell Taylor	2	2	0	0	0	0	0
Lazlo Mike-Mayer	2	2	0	0	0	0	0
Marco Morales	1	1	0	0	0	0	0

=== Special teams ===
==== Kick return ====
Player	Ret	Yards	TD's
Durell Taylor	28	516	0
Chris Brewer	7	85	0
Steve Trimble	4	18	0
Gary Mullen	2	18	0
William Cotman	1	30	0
Phil Forte	1	5	0
Clyde Skipper	1	0	0
Kelly Kirchbaum	0	0	0

==== Kicking ====
Player	FGM	4pg	FGA	Pct.	XPM	2pt	XPA	Pct.	Pts.
Marco Morales	2	0	12	16.7	11	0	18	61.1	17
Lazlo Mike-Mayer	0	0	8	0.0	8	0	11	72.7	8
Marty Coyne	0	0	2	0.0	0	0	5	0	0

== Awards ==
Position	Player	Award	All-Arena team
Head coach	Tim Marcum	Coach of the Year	–
Fullback/Linebacker	Chris Brewer	none	1st
Wide Receiver/Defensive Back	Gary Mullen	none	1st
Quarterback	Whit Taylor	none	2nd
Fullback/Linebacker	Durell Taylor	none	2nd
Offensive/Defensive Lineman	Patrick Cain	none	2nd
Offensive/Defensive Lineman	Kelly Kirchbaum	none	2nd
