= 1987 Chicago Bruisers season =

Arena Football League team season

- Head coach: Ray Jauch
- Home stadium: Rosemont Horizon

Results
- Record: 2–4
- Division place: 4th
- Playoffs: did not qualify

The 1987 Chicago Bruisers season was the first season for the arena football franchise. The Bruisers took a chance with a young team that averaged 25 years of age. The Bruisers' lost their first game in franchise history, 44–52 in overtime, to the Denver Dynamite. The Bruisers struggled in their second game, giving up 45 points in the first half before losing 23–60 to the Pittsburgh Gladiators. Despite getting off to a 2–3 start, the Bruisers had an opportunity to make it to ArenaBowl I with a win in the final week of the season against the Dynamite. The Bruisers however would lose 35–52. They finished with a record of 2–4 and failed to qualify for the playoffs.

== Schedule ==
| Week | Date | Opponent | Results | | Game site |
| Week | Date | Opponent | Final score | Team record | Game site |
|---|---|---|---|---|---|
| 1 | June 20 | Denver Dynamite | L 44–52 (OT) | 0–1 | Rosemont Horizon |
| 2 | June 22 | Pittsburgh Gladiators | L 23–60 | 0–2 | Rosemont Horizon |
| 3 | July 2 | at Pittsburgh Gladiators | L 14–49 | 0–3 | Civic Arena |
| 4 | July 10 | Washington Commandos | W 37–36 | 1–3 | Rosemont Horizon |
| 5 | July 16 | at Washington Commandos | W 64–61 | 2–3 | Capital Centre |
| 6 | July 24 | at Denver Dynamite | L 35–52 | 2–4 | McNichols Sports Arena |

=== Standings ===
1987 Arena Football League standings
| Team | W | L | T | PCT | PF | PA | PF (Avg.) | PA (Avg.) | STK |
|---|---|---|---|---|---|---|---|---|---|
| y-Pittsburgh Gladiators | 4 | 2 | 0 | .667 | 268 | 199 | 44.6 | 33.1 | L 2 |
| x-Denver Dynamite | 4 | 2 | 0 | .667 | 261 | 252 | 43.5 | 42 | W 2 |
| Washington Commandos | 2 | 4 | 0 | .333 | 288 | 273 | 48 | 45.5 | W 1 |
| Chicago Bruisers | 2 | 4 | 0 | .333 | 217 | 310 | 36.1 | 51.6 | L 1 |

y – clinched regular-season title

x – clinched playoff spot

== Roster ==
1987 Chicago Bruisers roster
| Quarterbacks: 10 Mike Hold, Jr.; 2 Sean Payton; Wide Receivers/Defensive Backs: 34 Stephen Finch; -- Daryl Hart; 21 Troy Hill; 40 Terry Hinn; -- Mike McDade; 21 Durwood Roquemore; -- Ken Sanders; 1 Reggie Smith | Running Backs/Linebackers: 82 Osia Lewis; -- Reggie Oliver; 25 Eddie Phillips; 32 Billy Stone; -- Fred Stone; -- Dennis Washington; Offensive Linemen/Defensive Linemen: 42 Dane Griffin; 65 Brent Johnson; 60 Eric Larkin; -- William Logan; -- Mike McCurry; -- Mark Rodenhauser | Wide Receivers/Linebackers: 25 Richard Rodgers; Kickers: 20 Nick Mike-Mayer; Rookies in italics Roster updated February 5, 2013 |

== Stats ==
=== Offense ===
==== Passing ====
| Player | Comp. | Att. | Comp% | Yards | TD's | INT's | Rating |
|---|---|---|---|---|---|---|---|
| Mike Hold, Jr. | 66 | 139 | 47.5 | 787 | 16 | 4 | 82 |
| Sean Payton | 5 | 14 | 35.7 | 47 | 0 | 3 | 6.3 |

==== Rushing ====
| Player | Car. | Yards | TD's |
|---|---|---|---|
| Billy Stone | 25 | 139 | 4 |
| Mike Hold, Jr. | 25 | 97 | 2 |
| Eddie Phillips | 13 | 65 | 1 |
| Mike McDade | 1 | 1 | 0 |
| Terry Hinn | 1 | 0 | 0 |
| Sean Payton | 1 | −16 | 0 |

==== Receiving ====
| Player | Rec. | Yards | TD's |
|---|---|---|---|
| Reggie Smith | 18 | 185 | 3 |
| Stephen Finch | 12 | 160 | 3 |
| Mike McDade | 12 | 120 | 2 |
| Durwood Roquemore | 11 | 99 | 1 |
| Richard Rodgers | 7 | 135 | 4 |
| Ken Sanders | 3 | 31 | 1 |
| Daryl Hart | 2 | 57 | 2 |
| Terry Hinn | 2 | 14 | 0 |
| Mike Hold, Jr. | 1 | 12 | 0 |
| Eddie Phillips | 1 | 8 | 0 |
| Billy Stone | 1 | 7 | 0 |
| Troy Hill | 1 | 6 | 0 |

=== Defense ===
| Player | Tackles | Solo | Assisted | Sack | INT | Yards | TD's |
|---|---|---|---|---|---|---|---|
| Fred Stone | 37 | 26 | 22 | 3 | 0 | 0 | 0 |
| Durwood Roquemore | 36 | 35 | 2 | 0 | 2 | 21 | 0 |
| Daryl Hart | 23.5 | 18 | 11 | 0 | 3 | 47 | 0 |
| Terry Hinn | 23 | 22 | 2 | 5 | 1 | 2 | 0 |
| Stephen Finch | 20 | 16 | 8 | 0 | 2 | 45 | 1 |
| Brent Johnson | 19 | 17 | 4 | 0 | 0 | 0 | 0 |
| Osia Lewis | 16 | 14 | 4 | 3 | 0 | 0 | 0 |
| Richard Rodgers | 16 | 14 | 4 | 0 | 0 | 0 | 0 |
| Mike McDade | 14 | 14 | 0 | 0 | 0 | 0 | 0 |
| Troy Hill | 10.5 | 8 | 5 | 0 | 0 | 0 | 0 |
| Eddie Phillips | 10.5 | 7 | 7 | 0 | 0 | 0 | 0 |
| Mike McCurry | 8.5 | 6 | 5 | 3 | 0 | 0 | 0 |
| Dane Griffin | 8 | 5 | 6 | 2 | 0 | 0 | 0 |
| Dennis Washington | 6 | 5 | 2 | 0 | 0 | 0 | 0 |
| Reggie Smith | 5 | 4 | 2 | 0 | 1 | 14 | 0 |
| Eric Larkin | 4.5 | 2 | 5 | 0 | 0 | 0 | 0 |
| Reggie Oliver | 3.5 | 3 | 1 | 0 | 0 | 0 | 0 |
| Ken Sanders | 3 | 3 | 0 | 0 | 0 | 0 | 0 |
| Mark Rodenhauser | 1 | 1 | 0 | 0 | 0 | 0 | 0 |
| Nick Mike-Mayer | 1 | 1 | 0 | 0 | 0 | 0 | 0 |
| William Logan | 0 | 0 | 0 | 0 | 0 | 0 | 0 |

=== Special teams ===
==== Kick return ====
| Player | Ret | Yards | TD's |
|---|---|---|---|
| Reggie Smith | 19 | 305 | 1 |
| Terry Hinn | 8 | 153 | 0 |
| Stephen Finch | 5 | 85 | 0 |
| Mike McDade | 4 | 34 | 0 |
| Troy Hill | 2 | 25 | 0 |
| Richard Rodgers | 2 | 18 | 0 |
| Dennis Washington | 1 | 9 | 0 |
| Billy Stone | 1 | 8 | 0 |
| Durwood Roquemore | 1 | 0 | 0 |
| Daryl Hart | 1 | 0 | 1 |

==== Kicking ====
| Player | FGM | 4pg | FGA | Pct. | XPM | 2pt | XPA | Pct. | Pts. |
|---|---|---|---|---|---|---|---|---|---|
| Nick Mike-Mayer | 7 | 0 | 26 | 26.9 | 19 | 0 | 24 | 79.2 | 40 |
| Mike Hold, Jr. | 0 | 0 | 1 | 0.0 | 0 | 1 | 1 | 0.0 | 2 |

== Awards ==
| Position | Player | Award | All-Arena team |
|---|---|---|---|
| Fullback/linebacker | Billy Stone | Ironman of the Year | 1st |
| Offensive/Defensive lineman | Brent Johnson | none | 1st |
| Kicker | Nick Mike-Mayer | none | 1st |
| Wide receiver/defensive back | Reggie Smith | none | 2nd |
