= 1987 Pittsburgh Gladiators season =

Arena Football League team season

- Head coach: Joe Haering
- Home stadium: Pittsburgh Civic Arena

Results
- Record: 4–2
- League place: 1st
- Playoffs: Lost ArenaBowl I (Dynamite) 16-45
- Team MVP: Russell Hairston

The 1987 Pittsburgh Gladiators season was the first season for the Gladiators. They finished 4–2 and lost a 45–16 game against the Denver Dynamite in ArenaBowl I.

== Regular season ==
=== Schedule ===
| Week | Date | Opponent | Results | | Game site |
| Week | Date | Opponent | Final score | Team record | Game site |
|---|---|---|---|---|---|
| 1 | June 19 | Washington Commandos | W 48–46 | 1–0 | Civic Arena |
| 2 | June 26 | at Chicago Bruisers | W 60–23 | 2–0 | Rosemont Horizon |
| 3 | July 2 | Chicago Bruisers | W 49–14 | 3–0 | Civic Arena |
| 4 | July 11 | at Denver Dynamite | W 49–32 | 4–0 | McNichols Sports Arena |
| 5 | July 17 | Denver Dynamite | L 31–32 | 4–1 | Civic Arena |
| 6 | July 23 | at Washington Commandos | L 31–52 | 4–2 | Capital Centre |

=== Standings ===
1987 Arena Football League standings
| Team | W | L | T | PCT | PF | PA | PF (Avg.) | PA (Avg.) | STK |
|---|---|---|---|---|---|---|---|---|---|
| y-Pittsburgh Gladiators | 4 | 2 | 0 | .667 | 268 | 199 | 44.6 | 33.1 | L 2 |
| x-Denver Dynamite | 4 | 2 | 0 | .667 | 261 | 252 | 43.5 | 42 | W 2 |
| Washington Commandos | 2 | 4 | 0 | .333 | 288 | 273 | 48 | 45.5 | W 1 |
| Chicago Bruisers | 2 | 4 | 0 | .333 | 217 | 310 | 36.1 | 51.6 | L 1 |

y – clinched regular-season title

x – clinched playoff spot

== Playoffs ==
| Round | Date | Opponent | Results | | Game site |
| Round | Date | Opponent | Final score | Team record | Game site |
|---|---|---|---|---|---|
| ArenaBowl I | August 1 | Denver Dynamite | L 16–45 | 0–1 | Civic Arena |

== Roster ==
1987 Pittsburgh Gladiators roster
| Quarterbacks: 7 Brendan Folmar; 9 Mike Hohensee; -- Kevin Russell; -- Stan Yagiello; Wide receivers/defensive backs: 95 Greg Best; 23 Russell Hairston; 31 John McClennon; 8 Ricky Mitchell; 28 Jim Rafferty; 29 Rodney Richmond; 30 Mike Stoops | Running backs/linebackers: 45 Creig Federico; -- Mike Powell; Offensive/defensive linemen: 85 Earnest Adams; 9_ Scott Dmitrenko; -- George Miller; 54 Craig Walls; 67 Thomas Weaver; -- Willis Yates | Wide receivers/linebackers: None; Kickers: -- Lee Larson; Rookies in italics Roster updated February 4, 2013; 20 active, 0 inactive, 0 PS → More rosters |

== Stats ==
=== Offense ===
==== Quarterback ====
| Player | Comp. | Att. | Comp% | Yards | TD's | INT's | Rating |
|---|---|---|---|---|---|---|---|
| Brendan Folmar | 119 | 205 | 58.0 | 1349 | 21 | 9 | 85.2 |
| Mike Hohensee | 32 | 55 | 58.2 | 483 | 7 | 1 | 111.4 |
| Kevin Russell | 2 | 3 | 66.7 | 11 | 0 | 0 | 72.9 |
| Stan Yagiello | 0 | 3 | 0.0 | 0 | 0 | 0 | 39.6 |

==== Running backs ====
| Player | Car. | Yards | TD's |
|---|---|---|---|
| Creig Federico | 10 | 21 | 1 |
| Brendan Folmar | 14 | 13 | 2 |
| Mike Hohensee | 3 | 11 | 1 |
| Scott Dmitrenko | 3 | 6 | 1 |
| Mike Stoops | 1 | 3 | 0 |
| John McClennon | 1 | 2 | 0 |
| Ricky Mitchell | 2 | 1 | 0 |
| Mike Powell | 1 | −1 | 0 |
| Stan Yagiello | 2 | −3 | 0 |

==== Wide receivers ====
| Player | Rec. | Yards | TD's |
|---|---|---|---|
| Russell Hairston | 67 | 1126 | 18 |
| Mike Stoops | 22 | 232 | 3 |
| John McClennon | 22 | 131 | 1 |
| Jim Rafferty | 20 | 170 | 2 |
| Creig Federico | 12 | 54 | 2 |
| Mike Powell | 5 | 81 | 2 |
| Kevin Russell | 2 | 11 | 0 |
| Ricky Mitchell | 1 | 21 | 0 |
| Greg Best | 1 | 11 | 0 |
| George Miller | 1 | 6 | 0 |

=== Defense ===
| Player | Tackles | Solo | Assisted | Sack | INT | Yards | TD's |
|---|---|---|---|---|---|---|---|
| Rock Richmond | 31 | 29 | 4 | 3 | 4 | 31 | 1 |
| Craig Walls | 19 | 15 | 8 | 13 | 0 | 0 | 0 |
| Russell Hairston | 17.5 | 16 | 0 | 0 | 4 | 50 | 1 |
| Creig Federico | 17 | 12 | 10 | 3 | 0 | 0 | 0 |
| Scott Dmitrenko | 15 | 13 | 4 | 3 | 0 | 0 | 0 |
| Mike Stoops | 14.5 | 11 | 7 | 0 | 1 | 0 | 0 |
| John McClennon | 12.5 | 9 | 7 | 0 | 1 | 5 | 0 |
| Ricky Mitchell | 11 | 10 | 2 | 2 | 0 | 0 | 0 |
| Jim Rafferty | 10.5 | 8 | 2 | 0 | 2 | 4 | 0 |
| Thomas Weaver | 9 | 7 | 4 | 3 | 1 | 2 | 0 |
| Earnest Adams | 8 | 6 | 4 | 5 | 0 | 0 | 0 |
| Mike Powell | 6 | 5 | 2 | 0 | 0 | 0 | 0 |
| Greg Best | 6 | 6 | 0 | 0 | 0 | 0 | 0 |
| Willis Yates | 5 | 4 | 2 | 6 | 0 | 0 | 0 |
| Lee Larsen | 2.5 | 2 | 1 | 0 | 0 | 0 | 0 |

=== Special teams ===
==== Kick return ====
| Player | Ret | Yards | TD's |
|---|---|---|---|
| Ricky Mitchell | 24 | 464 | 2 |
| Jim Rafferty | 10 | 69 | 0 |
| John McClennon | 5 | 80 | 0 |
| Scott Dmitrenko | 1 | 26 | 0 |
| Mike Stoops | 1 | 5 | 0 |

==== Kicking ====
| Player | FGM | 4pg | FGA | Pct. | XPM | 2pt | XPA | Pct. | Pts. |
|---|---|---|---|---|---|---|---|---|---|
| Lee Larsen | 6 | 0 | 21 | 28.6 | 13 | 0 | 28 | 46.4 | 31 |

== Awards ==
| Position | Player | Award | All-Arena team |
|---|---|---|---|
| Wide receiver/defensive back | Russell Hairston | Most Valuable Player | 1st |
| Offensive/defensive lineman | Craig Walls | none | 1st |
| Wide receiver/defensive back | Mike Stoops | none | 2nd |
