= Stuart Mitchell (American football) =

American football player (born 1964)

No. 2
- Position: Quarterback

Personal information
- Born: November 2, 1964 (age 62)
- Listed height: 6 ft 2 in (1.88 m)
- Listed weight: 205 lb (93 kg)

Career information
- High school: McBurney (Manhattan, New York)
- College: Cornell
- NFL draft: 1987: undrafted

Career history
- Denver Dynamite (1987); Pittsburgh Gladiators (1988)

Awards and highlights
- ArenaBowl champion (1987)

Career AFL statistics
- Comp. / Att.: 34 / 84
- Passing yards: 443
- TD–INT: 7–2
- QB rating: 68.70
- Total TDs: 12
- Stats at ArenaFan.com

Stuart A. Mitchell (born November 2, 1964) is an American former professional football quarterback who played two seasons in the Arena Football League (AFL) with the Denver Dynamite and Pittsburgh Gladiators. He played college football at Cornell University.

== Early life ==
Stuart A. Mitchell was on November 2, 1964. He played high school football at McBurney School in Manhattan, New York, as a quarterback.

== College career ==
Mitchell played college football for the Cornell Big Red of Cornell University. He mostly played tight end and special teams but also spent some time at quarterback. He was not a full-time starter at tight end until his senior year in 1986. Mitchell also played basketball at Cornell, appearing in 25 games during the 1982–83 season as a guard while averaging 2.7 points, 1.9 assists, and 2.3 rebounds per game. He graduated from Cornell with a degree in business management in May 1987.

== Professional career ==
After going undrafted in the 1987 NFL draft, Mitchell tried out for the Toronto Argonauts and Hamilton Tiger-Cats of the Canadian Football League but was not offered a contract. He then signed with the Denver Dynamite of the upstart Arena Football League. He started at quarterback during the first game in Dynamite history on June 20, 1987, completing 21 of 42 passes for 298 yards and six touchdowns while also rushing for 26 yards and two touchdowns in a nationally televised game on ESPN. Denver won 52–44 against the Chicago Bruisers and Mitchell was named the game's MVP. Due to contracting flu, he did not start the team's next game on June 27 against the Washington Commandos. However, after Denver quarterback Marty Mornhinweg suffered a season-ending knee injury, Mitchell entered the game and completed 8 of 27 passes. Whit Taylor started Denver's next game and set an AFL record with 10 touchdowns. Mitchell remained the backup to Taylor as the Dynamite won ArenaBowl I.

Mitchell played in nine games for the AFL's Pittsburgh Gladiators in 1988, recording four completions on ten pass attempts for 24 yards, ten receptions for 79 yards and two touchdowns, two carries for one yard, two kick returns for 40 yards, 17 solo tackles, eight assisted tackles, one defensive interception, and one fumble recovery.
