= Larry Friday =

American football player (born 1958)

No. 20, 31, 39, 27, 40
- Position: Defensive back

Personal information
- Born: January 23, 1958 (age 68); Jackson, Mississippi, U.S.
- Listed height: 6 ft 4 in (1.93 m)
- Listed weight: 215 lb (98 kg)

Career information
- High school: Callaway (Jackson)
- College: Mississippi State
- NFL draft: 1981: 11th round, 298th overall pick

Career history
- Cleveland Browns (1981); Montreal Concordes (1982); Baltimore Colts (1983)*; San Francisco 49ers (1983)*; Pittsburgh Maulers (1984); Birmingham Stallions (1985); Denver Dynamite (1987); Buffalo Bills (1987); Detroit Drive (1988); New England Steamrollers (1988)
- * Offseason or practice squad member only

Awards and highlights
- 2× ArenaBowl champion (1987, 1988)

Career NFL statistics
- Games played: 1
- Stats at Pro Football Reference

Career AFL statistics
- Tackles: 18
- Pass break-ups: 1
- Stats at ArenaFan.com

Lawrence D. Friday (born January 23, 1958) is an American former professional football player who was a defensive back in the National Football League (NFL). He saw action in one game for the Buffalo Bills in 1987. He played college football for the Mississippi State Bulldogs.
