= Jon Norris =

American football player and coach (born 1962)

No. 65, 98
- Position: Defensive end

Personal information
- Born: November 1, 1962 (age 64); Port Talbot, Wales
- Listed height: 6 ft 3 in (1.91 m)
- Listed weight: 260 lb (118 kg)

Career information
- High school: Stratford (Stratford, Connecticut, U.S.)
- College: American International
- NFL draft: 1985: undrafted

Career history

Playing
- New England Patriots (1985); Denver Dynamite (1987); Chicago Bears (1987); Denver Dynamite (1990–1991); Sacramento Attack (1992)

Coaching
- Adams State (1993–1996) Defensive coordinator; Oklahoma Panhandle State (1997–1999) Head coach; Tulsa Talons (2000) Head coach; Oklahoma Wranglers (2001) Assistant head coach and line coach; Dallas Desperados (2002–2004) Line coach and special teams coach; Austin Wranglers (2005–2006) Defensive coordinator and line coach; Bossier–Shreveport Battle Wings (2007–2010) Head coach; New Orleans VooDoo (2011) Head coach

Operations
- New Orleans VooDoo (2011–2012) Vice president and general manager

Awards and highlights
- ArenaBowl champion (1987)

Career NFL statistics
- Interceptions: 1
- Stats at Pro Football Reference

Jonathan Richard Norris (born November 1, 1962) is an American former football player and coach. He served as the head football coach at Oklahoma Panhandle State University in Goodwell, Oklahoma from 1997 to 1999.

A 1985 graduate of American International College, Norris was signed out of college by the New England Patriots where he spent the 1985 NFL season on injured reserve during New England's run through the 1985–86 NFL playoffs and appearance in Super Bowl XX. Norris played as a defensive lineman for the Chicago Bears in 1987.

== Coaching career ==
Norris was the defensive coordinator at Adams State from 1993 to 1996.

He was then the head coach at Oklahoma Panhandle State from 1997 to 1999.

Norris was the head coach of the Tulsa Talons of the af2 during their inaugural season in 2000.

He was then the assistant head coach and line coach for the Oklahoma Wranglers of the Arena Football League (AFL) in 2001.

He was the line coach and special teams coach for the Dallas Desperados of the AFL from 2002 to 2004.

Norris was the defensive coordinator and line coach for the AFL's Austin Wranglers from 2005 to 2006.

He was then the head coach of the Bossier–Shreveport Battle Wings of the af2 and AFL from 2007 to 2010.

He was hired as the vice president and general manager of the New Orleans VooDoo of the AFL in 2010. In June 2011, he resigned to become the team's interim head coach during the final four games of the 2011 season. Afterwards, he returned to his front office role with the team. Norris was released by the VooDoo in August 2012.

== Head coaching record ==
Year	Team	Overall	Conference	Standing	Bowl/playoffs
Oklahoma Panhandle State Aggies (NAIA Independent) (1997–1998)
1997	Oklahoma Panhandle St	3–7			
1998	Oklahoma Panhandle St	3–7			
Oklahoma Panhandle St:		6–14			
Total:		6–14			
