= Richard Rodgers Sr. =

American football player and coach (born 1961)

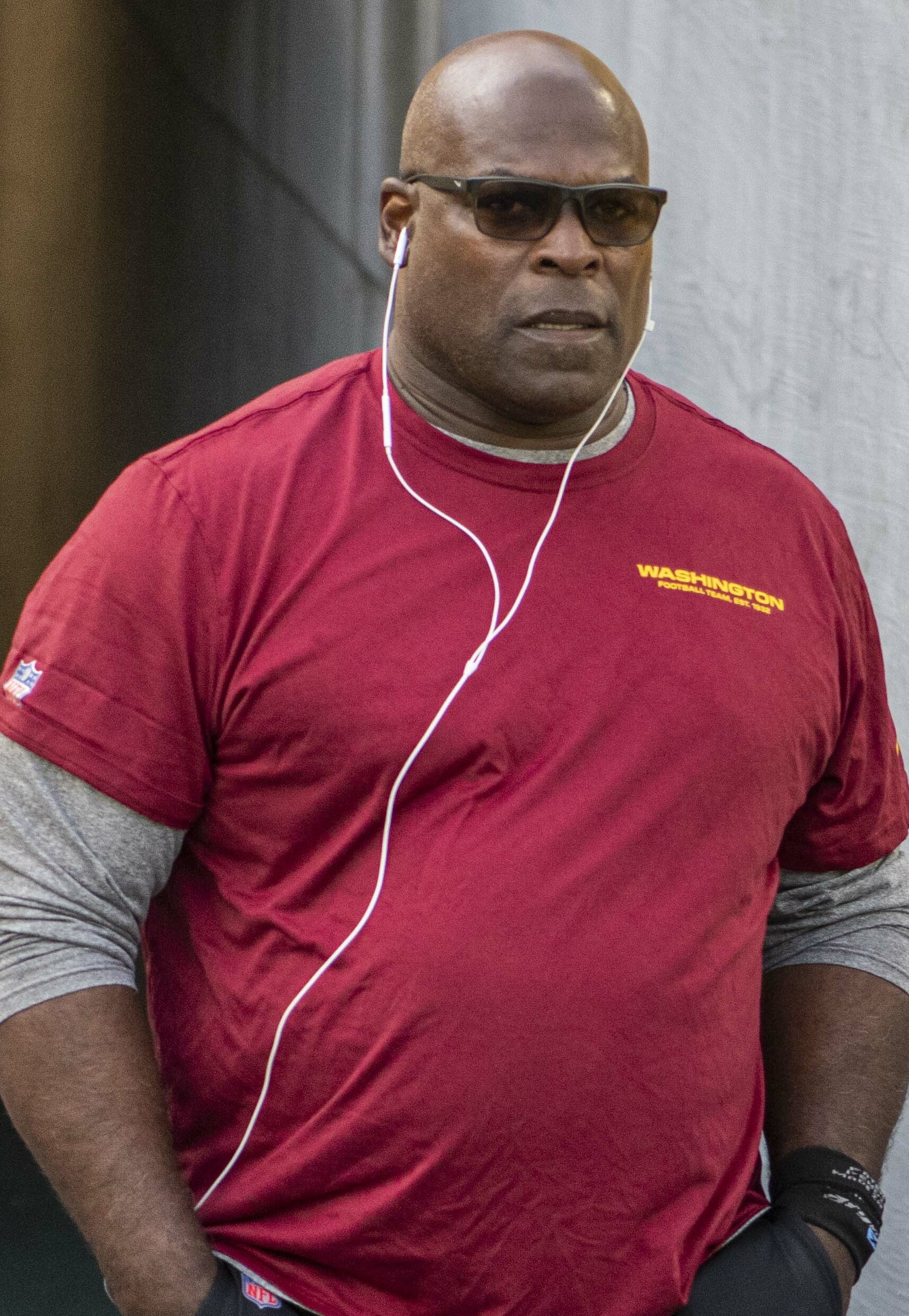
- Rodgers in 2021

UCLA Bruins
- Title: Special assistant to the Head Coach

Personal information
- Born: October 28, 1961 (age 65)
- Listed height: 6 ft 0 in (1.83 m)
- Listed weight: 200 lb (91 kg)

Career information
- Position: Wide receiver/Linebacker
- College: California

Career history

Playing
- Chicago Bruisers (1987); Denver Dynamite (1987); Los Angeles Cobras (1988); Sacramento Attack (1992)

Coaching
- Diablo Valley Community College (1989–1994) Assistant coach; San Jose State (1995–1996) Secondary and special teams assistant; Portland State (1997–2000) Secondary and special teams coach; New Mexico State (2001–2004) Secondary coach; Holy Cross (2005–2011) Defensive coordinator & secondary coach; Carolina Panthers (2012) Assistant special teams coach; Carolina Panthers (2012–2014) Special teams coordinator; Carolina Panthers (2015–2017) Assistant defensive backs & safeties coach; Carolina Panthers (2018) Secondary coach; Carolina Panthers (2019) Safeties coach; Washington Football Team / Commanders (2020–2022) Assistant defensive backs coach; Washington Commanders (2023) Senior defensive assistant/safeties coach; James Madison (2025) Associate head coach; UCLA (2026–present) Special assistant to the Head Coach

Awards and highlights
- ArenaBowl champion (1987); Second-team All-Pac-10 (1983)
- Stats at ArenaFan.com

Richard Rodgers Sr. (born October 28, 1961) is an American football coach and former Arena Football League (AFL) player. He is currently an assistant coach at UCLA, following head coach Bob Chesney there after serving on Chesney's staff at James Madison.

== Playing career ==
Rodgers played college football for the California Golden Bears and earned all-conference honors as a defensive back. As a junior, he became known for being a part of "The Play" against Stanford, where he handled two of the five laterals that resulted in a miraculous game-winning touchdown as time expired.

Rodgers spent time in the Canadian and Arena football leagues after college.

== Coaching career ==
Rodgers began coaching as soon as he retired from the AFL as a player. Rodgers coached at the college level for 24 seasons before joining the NFL ranks in 2012. In 2014, he was part of the Pro Bowl staff and the following year, Rodgers coached in Super Bowl 50 with the NFC Champion Carolina Panthers. He later coached for the Washington Commanders before returning to college coaching in 2025.

Rodgers is the father of five children, including former NFL tight end Richard Rodgers. Like his father, the younger Rodgers played for the California Golden Bears and later also became known for being a part of a miraculous game-ending score while a member of the Green Bay Packers, when he caught a Hail Mary pass from Aaron Rodgers in a play that became known as the Miracle in Motown.
