= Marco Morales (American football) =

American football player (born 1962)

No. 3
- Position: Placekicker

Personal information
- Born: January 7, 1962 (age 64); Mexicali, Mexico
- Listed height: 6 ft 0 in (1.83 m)
- Listed weight: 195 lb (88 kg)

Career information
- High school: Castle Park (Chula Vista, California, U.S.)
- College: Southwestern (CA) (1980–1981); San Diego State (1982–1983)

Career history
- New York Jets (1984)*; Denver Gold (1985)*; Denver Dynamite (1987); Chicago Bruisers (1988); San Francisco 49ers (1989)*; Dallas Texans (1990); New Orleans Night (1991–1992)
- * Offseason or practice squad member only

Awards and highlights
- ArenaBowl champion (1987); First-team All-Arena (1988); Second-team All-Arena (1991)
- Stats at ArenaFan.com

Marco Morales (born January 7, 1962) is a Mexican former professional American football placekicker who played five seasons in the Arena Football League (AFL) with the Denver Dynamite, Chicago Bruisers, Dallas Texans and New Orleans Night. He played college football at Southwestern College and San Diego State University.

== Early life ==
Morales was born on January 7, 1962, in Mexicali, Mexico. He attended Castle Park High School in Chula Vista, California, where he played soccer and football. Morales earned first-team all-Mission Conference honors as both a kicker and punter at Southwestern College in Chula Vista, converting on 20 of 28 field goal attempts in two seasons for the Apaches, before transferring to San Diego State as a walk-on. In 1982, he tied an NCAA record with four field goals in a half against UNLV.

== Professional career ==
Morales signed with the New York Jets of the National Football League (NFL) after going undrafted in the 1984 NFL draft. However, he was later released.

Morales signed with the Denver Gold of the United States Football League (USFL) for the 1985 USFL season. He was released on January 21, 1985.

Morales played in three games for the Denver Dynamite of the Arena Football League (AFL) during the AFL's inaugural 1987 season, converting two of 12 field goals and 11 of 18 extra points while also posting one solo tackle, one forced fumble, and one pass breakup. The Dynamite finished the season with a 4–2 record. On August 1, 1987, the Dynamite beat the Pittsburgh Gladiators in ArenaBowl I by a score of 45–16.

Morales appeared in 12 games for the Chicago Bruisers of the AFL in 1988, recording six of 31 field goals, 50 of 67 extra points, one successful two-point field goal, eight solo tackles, and three assisted tackles. The Bruisers finished the year 10–1–1 and lost to the Detroit Drive in ArenaBowl II. Morales was named first-team All-Arena for his performance during the 1988 season.

Morales signed with the San Francisco 49ers of the NFL in 1989, but was later released.

Morales played in seven games for the AFL's Dallas Texans in 1990, totaling six of 21 field goals, 18 of 24 extra points, and three solo tackles. The Texans finished the 1990 season with a 6–2 record. Morales advanced to his third ArenaBowl in three AFL seasons, all with different franchises. The Texans lost to the Detroit Drive in ArenaBowl IV.

Morales played in all ten games for the New Orleans Night of the AFL in 1991, converting 17 of 45 field goals, 27 of 38 extra points, eight solo tackles, and two assisted tackles as the Night finished 4–6. Morales earned second-team All-Arena honors for the 1991 season. He appeared in five games for New Orleans in 1992, making five of 18 field goals and 12 of 15 extra points.
