= 1987 Washington Commandos season =

Arena Football League team season

- Head coach: Bob Harrison
- Home stadium: Capital Centre

Results
- Record: 2–4
- Division place: 3rd
- Playoffs: did not qualify

The 1987 Washington Commandos season was the first season for the Commandos.

The Commandos had the honor of playing in the first AFL regular season game on June 19, 1987, losing to the Pittsburgh Gladiators 46-48 at the Civic Arena. The Commandos picked up their first win in franchise history the following week, when they defeated the Denver Dynamite, by a score of 36-20 in their home opener. The Commandos finished the season with a 2-4 record, a disappointment, but the team was in every game except one, losing 3 games by a total of 6 points.

== Regular season ==
=== Schedule ===
| Week | Date | Opponent | Results | | Game site |
| Week | Date | Opponent | Final score | Team record | Game site |
|---|---|---|---|---|---|
| 1 | June 19 | at Pittsburgh Gladiators | L 46–48 | 0–1 | Civic Arena |
| 2 | June 27 | Denver Dynamite | W 36–20 | 1–1 | Capital Centre |
| 3 | July 3 | at Denver Dynamite | L 57–73 | 1–2 | McNichols Sports Arena |
| 4 | July 10 | at Chicago Bruisers | L 36–37 | 1–3 | Rosemont Horizon |
| 5 | July 16 | Chicago Bruisers | L 61–64 | 1–4 | Capital Centre |
| 6 | July 23 | Pittsburgh Gladiators | W 52–31 | 2–4 | Capital Centre |

=== Standings ===
1987 Arena Football League standings
| Team | W | L | T | PCT | PF | PA | PF (Avg.) | PA (Avg.) | STK |
|---|---|---|---|---|---|---|---|---|---|
| y-Pittsburgh Gladiators | 4 | 2 | 0 | .667 | 268 | 199 | 44.6 | 33.1 | L 2 |
| x-Denver Dynamite | 4 | 2 | 0 | .667 | 261 | 252 | 43.5 | 42 | W 2 |
| Washington Commandos | 2 | 4 | 0 | .333 | 288 | 273 | 48 | 45.5 | W 1 |
| Chicago Bruisers | 2 | 4 | 0 | .333 | 217 | 310 | 36.1 | 51.6 | L 1 |

y – clinched regular-season title

x – clinched playoff spot

== Roster ==
1987 Washington Commandos roster
| Quarterbacks: -- Mike Calhoun; -- Rich Ingold; Wide Receivers/Defensive Backs: 29 Nathan Creer; -- Dwayne Dixon; 28 Richard DuPree; -- Steve Griffin; -- Rex Motes; -- Lenny Taylor | Running Backs/Linebackers: -- Walter Holman; -- Peter Stubbs; -- Brett Wilson; -- Michael Witteck; -- Fernando McWherter; Offensive Linemen/Defensive Linemen: -- Sean McInerney; 67 Jon Roehlk; -- Kendall Walls; 68 Wes Walton | Wide Receivers/Linebackers: -- Robert Goins; Kickers: -- Dale Castro; Rookies in italics Roster updated February 4, 2013; 18 Active, 0 Inactive, 0 PS → More rosters |

== Stats ==
=== Offense ===
==== Quarterback ====
| Player | Comp. | Att. | Comp% | Yards | TD's | INT's | Rating |
|---|---|---|---|---|---|---|---|
| Rich Ingold | 149 | 235 | 63.4 | 1726 | 29 | 5 | 107.5 |
| Mike Calhoun | 4 | 12 | 33.3 | 50 | 1 | 1 | 33.3 |

==== Running backs ====
| Player | Car. | Yards | TD's |
|---|---|---|---|
| Brett Wilson | 15 | 42 | 1 |
| Walter Holman | 12 | 25 | 1 |
| Mike Calhoun | 5 | 5 | 0 |
| Richard DuPree | 2 | 3 | 0 |
| Rich Ingold | 20 | −3 | 0 |

==== Wide receivers ====
| Player | Rec. | Yards | TD's |
|---|---|---|---|
| Dwayne Dixon | 68 | 810 | 11 |
| Lenny Taylor | 44 | 531 | 8 |
| Steve Griffin | 22 | 242 | 4 |
| Richard DuPree | 7 | 61 | 2 |
| Rex Motes | 4 | 84 | 1 |
| Walter Holman | 4 | 9 | 4 |
| Brett Wilson | 3 | 28 | 0 |
| Nathan Creer | 1 | 11 | 0 |

=== Defense ===
| Player | Tackles | Solo | Assisted | Sack | INT | Yards | TD's |
|---|---|---|---|---|---|---|---|
| Rex Motes | 26 | 24 | 4 | 0 | 0 | 0 | 0 |
| Nathan Creer | 25.5 | 24 | 3 | 0 | 0 | 0 | 0 |
| Walter Holman | 21 | 17 | 8 | 2 | 1 | 3 | 0 |
| Pete Stubbs | 19.5 | 18 | 3 | 3 | 0 | 0 | 0 |
| Michael Witteck | 16 | 14 | 4 | 2 | 0 | 0 | 0 |
| Jon Roehlk | 15 | 11 | 8 | 6 | 0 | 0 | 0 |
| Dwayne Dixon | 13 | 12 | 2 | 0 | 0 | 0 | 0 |
| Sean McInerney | 9 | 8 | 2 | 3 | 0 | 0 | 0 |
| Robert Goins | 9 | 9 | 0 | 0 | 0 | 0 | 0 |
| Richard DuPree | 8.5 | 6 | 5 | 0 | 0 | 0 | 0 |
| Brett Wilson | 8 | 7 | 2 | 0 | 0 | 0 | 0 |
| Wes Walton | 7 | 4 | 6 | 2 | 0 | 0 | 0 |
| Fernando McWherter | 5 | 5 | 0 | 0 | 0 | 0 | 0 |
| Mike Calhoun | 3 | 2 | 2 | 3 | 0 | 0 | 0 |
| Kendall Walls | 2 | 2 | 0 | 0 | 0 | 0 | 0 |
| Steve Griffin | 1 | 1 | 0 | 0 | 0 | 0 | 0 |

=== Special teams ===
==== Kick return ====
| Player | Ret | Yards | TD's |
|---|---|---|---|
| Rex Motes | 15 | 269 | 0 |
| Lenny Taylor | 8 | 115 | 0 |
| Pete Stubbs | 4 | 41 | 1 |
| Richard DuPree | 2 | 36 | 0 |
| Dwayne Dixon | 2 | 15 | 0 |
| Nathan Creer | 1 | 29 | 0 |
| Mike Calhoun | 1 | 16 | 0 |
| Kendall Walls | 1 | 15 | 0 |
| Walter Holman | 1 | 0 | 0 |

==== Kicking ====
| Player | FGM | 4pg | FGA | Pct. | XPM | 2pt | XPA | Pct. | Pts. |
|---|---|---|---|---|---|---|---|---|---|
| Dale Castro | 12 | 0 | 21 | 57.1 | 16 | 0 | 31 | 51.6 | 52 |

== All-Arena team members ==
| Position | Player | All-Arena team |
|---|---|---|
| Quarterback | Rich Ingold | 1st |
| Wide Receiver/Defensive Back | Dwayne Dixon | 1st |
| Offensive/Defensive Lineman | Jon Roehlk | 1st |
| Fullback/Linebacker | Walter Holman | 2nd |
| Wide Receiver/Defensive Back | Lenny Taylor | 2nd |
| Offensive/Defensive Lineman | Michael Witteck | 2nd |
| Kicker | Dale Castro | 2nd |
