= Steve Trimble =

American football player (1958–2011)

No. 37, 47, 40
- Position: Defensive back

Personal information
- Born: May 11, 1958; Cumberland, Maryland, U.S.
- Died: July 11, 2011 (aged 53); Arlington, Virginia, U.S.
- Listed height: 5 ft 10 in (1.78 m)
- Listed weight: 181 lb (82 kg)

Career information
- High school: Fort Hill (Cumberland)
- College: Maryland
- NFL draft: 1981: undrafted

Career history
- Denver Broncos (1981–1983); Denver Gold (1984-1985); Denver Dynamite (1987); Chicago Bears (1987); Detroit Drive (1988)

Awards and highlights
- 2× ArenaBowl champion (1987, 1988); ArenaBowl Ironman of the Game (1987)
- Stats at Pro Football Reference
- Stats at ArenaFan.com

Steve Trimble (May 11, 1958 – July 11, 2011) was an American professional football player who was a defensive back in the National Football League (NFL), United States Football League (USFL), and Arena Football League (AFL). He played college football for the Maryland Terrapins, and high school at Fort Hill in Cumberland, Maryland.

Trimble was the head coach of Bishop Denis J. O'Connell High School in Arlington, Virginia from 2002 through 2010. He also coached in the NFL, Arena Football League, and college football.

Trimble died of a heart attack at O'Connell High School on July 11, 2011.

== Personal life ==
Trimble is survived on by his daughter, four sons, and wife Gretchen.
