= Durell Taylor =

American football player (born 1962)

No. 42
- Positions: Wide receiver, defensive back

Personal information
- Born: September 21, 1962 (age 64)
- Listed height: 5 ft 10 in (1.78 m)
- Listed weight: 185 lb (84 kg)

Career information
- College: Lincoln (MO)

Career history
- Denver Dynamite (1987); Seattle Seahawks (1987); Chicago Bruisers (1988)

Awards and highlights
- ArenaBowl champion (1987); Second-team All-Arena (1987)
- Stats at ArenaFan.com

Durell Taylor (born September 21, 1962) is an American former professional football player who played two seasons in the Arena Football League (AFL) with the Denver Dynamite and Chicago Bruisers. He played college football at Lincoln University.

== Early life and college ==
Durrell Taylor was born on September 21, 1962. He played college football for the Lincoln Blue Tigers of Lincoln University. He earned first-team All-MIAA honors.

== Professional career ==
Taylor played in all six games for the Denver Dynamite of the Arena Football League (AFL) during the league's inaugural 1987 season, totaling 25 catches for 283 yards and six touchdowns, eight carries for 39 yards, 28 kick returns for 516 yards, two solo tackles, and one pass breakup. He played both offense and defense during his time in the AFL as the league played under ironman rules. Taylor was named second-team All-Arena as a fullback/linebacker that year. The Dynamite finished the season with a 4–2 record and beat the Pittsburgh Gladiators in ArenaBowl I.

On September 24, 1987, Taylor signed with the Seattle Seahawks during the 1987 NFL players strike as a wide receiver. He was waived on October 9, 1987, before playing in a game.

On April 21, 1988, it was reported that Taylor had signed with the Chicago Bruisers of the AFL. He appeared in two games in 1988, recording two solo tackles and one kick return for 24 yards.
