= Rob DeVita =

American football player (born 1965)

No. 32, 58
- Position: Linebacker

Personal information
- Born: November 29, 1965 (age 60); Winfield, Illinois, U.S.
- Listed height: 6 ft 2 in (1.88 m)
- Listed weight: 222 lb (101 kg)

Career information
- High school: Central (Wheaton, Illinois)
- College: Eastern Illinois, Benedictine
- NFL draft: 1987: undrafted

Career history
- Denver Dynamite (1987); Seattle Seahawks (1987); Los Angeles Cobras (1988)

Awards and highlights
- ArenaBowl champion (1987)
- Stats at Pro Football Reference
- Stats at ArenaFan.com

Robert Gerard DeVita (born November 29, 1965) is an American former professional football linebacker who played one season with the Seattle Seahawks of the National Football League (NFL). He played college football at Eastern Illinois University and Illinois Benedictine College. DeVita was also member of the Denver Dynamite and Los Angeles Cobras of the Arena Football League (AFL).

== Early life and college ==
Robert Gerard DeVita was born on November 29, 1965, in Winfield, Illinois. He attended Wheaton Central High School in Wheaton, Illinois.

DeVita first played college football for the Eastern Illinois Panthers of Eastern Illinois University. He studied biology/health sciences while at Eastern Illinois. He then transferred to play for the Benedictine Eagles of Illinois Benedictine College, with his final year being in 1986.

== Professional career ==
After going undrafted in the 1987 NFL draft, DeVita signed with the Denver Dynamite of the Arena Football League (AFL). He played in three games for the Dynamite during the 1987 AFL season, recording nine solo tackles, seven assisted tackles, six sacks, and one fumble recovery. He was a fullback/linebacker during his time in the AFL as the league played under ironman rules. The Drive finished the season with a 4–2 record and won ArenaBowl I against the Pittsburgh Gladiators by a score of 45–16.

On September 27, 1987, DeVita was signed by the Seattle Seahawks of the National Football League (NFL) during the 1987 NFL players strike. He played in one game for the Seahawks, and was released after the strike ended.

DeVita signed with the Los Angeles Cobras of the AFL in 1988. He appeared in five games during the 1988 season, posting three solo tackles and four assisted tackles while also rushing four times for five yards.

== Personal life ==
DeVita became a financial advisor after his football career.
