= Patrick Cain =

American football player (1962–2016)

No. 50, 65
- Positions: Center, guard

Personal information
- Born: October 1, 1962; Denver, Colorado, U.S.
- Died: March 14, 2016 (aged 53); Superior, Colorado, U.S.
- Listed height: 6 ft 2 in (1.88 m)
- Listed weight: 260 lb (118 kg)

Career information
- High school: Pomona (Arvada, Colorado)
- College: Wichita State

Career history
- Denver Dynamite (1987); Detroit Lions (1987); Los Angeles Cobras (1988); Washington Commandos (1990)

Awards and highlights
- ArenaBowl champion (1987); Second-team All-Arena (1987)
- Stats at Pro Football Reference
- Stats at ArenaFan.com

Patrick James Cain Sr. (October 1, 1962 – March 14, 2016) was an American professional football offensive lineman who played one season with the Detroit Lions of the National Football League (NFL). He played college football at Wichita State University.

== Early life and college ==
Patrick James Cain was born on October 1, 1962, in Denver, Colorado. He attended Pomona High School in Arvada, Colorado. He lettered in wrestling, track, and football at Pomona High, and graduated in 1986.

Cain played college football for the Wichita State Shockers of Wichita State University. He graduated in 1986 with a bachelor's degree in psychology.

== Professional career ==
Cain played in all six games for the Denver Dynamite of the Arena Football League (AFL) during the league's inaugural 1987 season, recording seven solo tackles and three sacks, as the Dynamite finished 4–2. He was an offensive lineman/defensive lineman during his time in the AFL as the league played under ironman rules. On August 1, 1987, the Dynamite won ArenaBowl I against the Pittsburgh Gladiators by a score of 45–16. Cain was named second-team All-Arena for his performance during the 1987 season.

On September 23, 1987, Cain signed with the Detroit Lions of the National Football League (NFL) during the 1987 NFL players strike. He appeared in three games, starting two, for the Lions before being released on October 19, 1987, after the strike ended.

Cain signed with the Los Angeles Cobras of the AFL in 1988. He was placed on injured reserve in June 1988 and did not play in any games that year.

Cain played in all eight games for the AFL's Washington Commandos in 1990, totaling six solo tackles, seven assisted tackles, and two fumble recoveries.

== Personal life ==
Cain graduated from the University of Denver in 1998 with a master’s degree in social work. He worked as a licensed clinical social worker. He also sold real estate with his wife. Cain died on March 14, 2016, of lung cancer in Superior, Colorado.
