= Brendan Folmar =

American football player (born 1964)

No. 10
- Position: Quarterback

Personal information
- Born: April 2, 1964 (age 62); Birmingham, Alabama, U.S.
- Listed height: 6 ft 1 in (1.85 m)
- Listed weight: 200 lb (91 kg)

Career information
- High school: California (Coal Center, Pennsylvania)
- College: California (PA) (1983–1986)
- NFL draft: 1987: undrafted

Career history
- Pittsburgh Gladiators (1987–1988, 1990); Detroit Lions (1987)

Career AFL statistics
- Comp. / Att.: 313 / 559
- Passing yards: 3,504
- TD–INT: 54–26
- Passer rating: 79.63
- Rushing TDs: 5
- Stats at ArenaFan.com
- Stats at Pro Football Reference

Brendan Arthur Folmar (born April 2, 1964) is an American former professional football quarterback who played three seasons with the Pittsburgh Gladiators of the Arena Football League (AFL). He played college football at California University of Pennsylvania. He was also a member of the Detroit Lions of the National Football League (NFL).

== Early life ==
Brendan Arthur Folmar was born on April 2, 1964, in Birmingham, Alabama. He attended California Area High School in Coal Center, Pennsylvania, graduating in 1982. He was a two-time team MVP in both football and basketball.

== College career ==
Folmar was a member of the California Vulcans football team from 1983 to 1986. He was the backup to All-American Kevin Russell from 1983 to 1984. He completed two of four passes for 15 yards and one touchdown in 1984. He was then the team's starter from 1985 to 1986. In 1985, Folmar passed for 1,891 yards and 11 touchdowns while also rushing for 365 yards and six touchdowns, earning second-team All-Pennsylvania State Athletic Conference (PSAC) honors. His senior year in 1986, Folmar completed 176 of 338 passes (52%) for 2,245 yards and 18 touchdowns and also scored seven rushing touchdowns, leading the PSAC in total offense. He garnered All-PSAC and Associated Press honorable mention All-American recognition that season. Folmar graduated with a bachelor's degree in elementary education in 1986. He was inducted into the California University of Pennsylvania Athletics Hall of Fame in 2001.

== Professional career ==
After going undrafted in the 1987 NFL draft, Folmar signed with the Pittsburgh Gladiators of the newly-formed Arena Football League (AFL). He began the AFL's inaugural 1987 season as the backup to Mike Hohensee but became the starter after Hohensee was injured early in the season. Folmar played in all six regular season games, completing 119 of 205 passes (58.0%) for 1,349 yards, 21 touchdowns, and nine interceptions while rushing for two touchdowns as well. The Gladiators finished the regular season with a 4–2 record, clinching homefield advantage in ArenaBowl I. Hohensee returned as the starter in the ArenaBowl but was benched for Folmar after the Denver Dynamite went ahead 18–0. The Gladiators eventually lost 45–16.

On September 23, 1987, Folmar signed with the Detroit Lions of the National Football League (NFL) during the 1987 NFL players strike. He played in one game for the Lions without recording any statistics. He was released on October 19, 1987, after the strike ended.

Folmar returned to the Gladiators in 1988 and played in all 12 games for them, splitting time with Mike Hohensee. Folmar totalled 101 completions on 195 passing attempts (51.8%) for 1,126 yards, 22 touchdowns, and nine interceptions, and one rushing touchdown. The Gladiators finished with a 6–6 record and lost to the Detroit Drive in the first round of the playoffs. Folmar appeared in all eight games for the Gladiators in 1990, splitting time with Larry Barretta. Folmar completed 93 of 159 passes (58.5%) for 1,029 yards, 11 touchdowns, and eight interceptions while scoring two rushing touchdowns as well. The Gladiators finished with a 3–5 record and lost to the Drive in the first round of the playoffs for the second consecutive season.

== Personal life ==
Folmar spent time playing flag football after his pro career and was the starter for the Tuner’s Tavern Flag Football team from Richmond, Virginia that were state and national finalists in 1997 and 1998. He was also an education coordinator at Poplar Springs Hospital in Virginia.
