= Foster Trophy =

U.S. football trophy

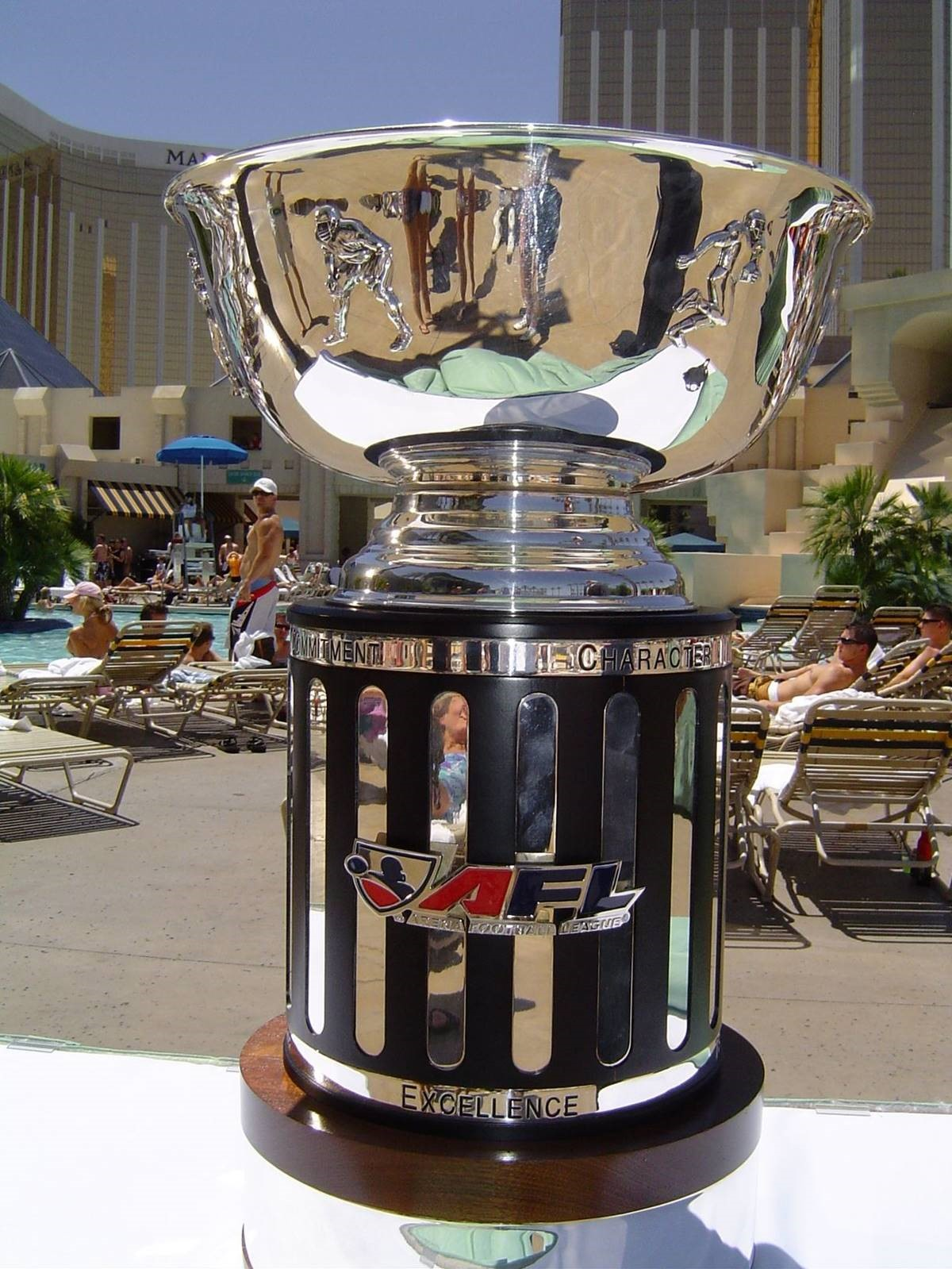
- The Jim Foster Trophy
- Sport: Arena football
- Awarded for: Winning the ArenaBowl, the championship game of the Arena Football League (1987–2019)
- Country: United States
- Presented by: Arena Football League

History
- First award: August 22, 1992; 33 years ago
- First winner: Denver Dynamite
- Most wins: Arizona Rattlers (5)
- Most recent: Albany Empire 1st title

The Foster Trophy was the official trophy given to the winning team of the championship game of the Arena Football League (AFL), the ArenaBowl. It was first awarded in 1992 and continued to be awarded until the league's folding in 2019. The name was used for two different trophies: one from 1992 to 2003, and from 2004 onwards (see below). It was named after Jim Foster, the inventor of the sport of arena football and the principal founder of the AFL, also serving as the sport's first commissioner.

== History ==
The bas-relief football players on the trophy were originally sculpted in Azbro Wax by Massachusetts sculptor James Linehan for the company New England Pewter. In 2004, the design was modified by Zweigle Advertising, Inc. of St. Louis Park, Minnesota.

When the San Jose SaberCats won ArenaBowl XVIII, the franchise ceased operations just months later. After disbanding, the franchise kept the Foster Trophy, not returning the property to the league. Thus, the AFL began handing out a new and smaller version of the trophy.

== Appearance ==
The 2004 version of the trophy stood 28 inches tall, weighed 60 pounds, and was worth nearly $50,000 ($85,227 in 2025 dollars). A 16-inch hand crafted hard wood column finished in stain black ebony held the AFL Championship Bowl. The black ebony column was accented with inlaid vertical sterling silver and two surface mounted horizontal sterling silver bands that were engraved with the words, "Character, Commitment, Excellence and Teamwork." The AFL logo was affixed to the front of the column. The base of the trophy was made of American Walnut and featured a sterling silver band that was engraved with every ArenaBowl champion.
