= AFL Hall of Fame =

AFL Hall of Fame may refer to:

- Arena Football Hall of Fame, arena football hall of fame
- Australian Football Hall of Fame, Australian rules football hall of fame
