= Chris Brewer =

American football player (born 1962)

No. 32, 26
- Position: Running back

Personal information
- Born: January 23, 1962 (age 64); Denver, Colorado, U.S.
- Listed height: 6 ft 2 in (1.88 m)
- Listed weight: 203 lb (92 kg)

Career information
- High school: George Washington (Denver)
- College: Arizona
- NFL draft: 1984: 9th round, 245th overall pick

Career history
- Denver Broncos (1984–1985); Denver Dynamite (1987); Chicago Bears (1987); New England Steamrollers (1988)

Awards and highlights
- ArenaBowl champion (1987); First-team All-Arena (1987); Second-team All-Pac-10 (1983)

Career NFL statistics
- Rushing yards: 83
- Rushing average: 2.4
- Rushing touchdowns: 2
- Stats at Pro Football Reference
- Stats at ArenaFan.com

Christopher Brewer (born January 23, 1962) is an American former professional football player who was a running back for two seasons in the National Football League (NFL) with the Denver Broncos and Chicago Bears. He was selected by the Broncos in the ninth round of the 1984 NFL draft. He played college football for the Arizona Wildcats. Brewer was also a member of the Denver Dynamite and New England Steamrollers of the Arena Football League (AFL).

== Early life ==
Brewer attended George Washington High School in Denver, Colorado.

== Professional career ==
Brewer was selected by the Arizona Wranglers in the 1984 USFL territorial draft.

Brewer was selected by the Denver Broncos with the 245th pick in the 1984 NFL draft and played in thirteen games for the team during the 1984 season. He was released by the Broncos on September 2, 1985.

In May 1986, the Arizona Outlaws traded Brewers' USFL rights to the Memphis Showboats.

Brewer played for the Denver Dynamite during the 1987 season, earning First-team All-Arena honors. The Dynamite won ArenaBowl I against the Pittsburgh Gladiators on August 1, 1987.

Brewer played in three games, starting one, for the Chicago Bears in 1987.

Brewer played for the New England Steamrollers in 1988.
