= Mike Hold =

American football player, coach, and executive (born 1963)

No. 10, 11
- Position: Quarterback

Personal information
- Born: March 16, 1963 (age 63); Phoenix, Arizona, U.S.
- Listed height: 6 ft 0 in (1.83 m)
- Listed weight: 190 lb (86 kg)

Career information
- High school: Corona del Sol (Tempe, Arizona)
- College: South Carolina
- NFL draft: 1986: undrafted

Career history

Playing
- Denver Broncos (1986)*; Chicago Bruisers (1987); Tampa Bay Buccaneers (1987); Maryland Commandos (1989); Denver Dynamite (1990–1991); Sacramento Attack (1992); Orlando Predators (1993); Connecticut Coyotes (1995); Arizona Rattlers (1996); Houston ThunderBears (1998–2000)
- * Offseason or practice squad member only

Coaching
- Augusta Stallions (2001–2002) Head coach; Carolina Cobras (2003) Head coach

Career NFL statistics
- Passing TD–INT: 2–1
- Passing yards: 123
- Passer rating: 61.6
- Stats at Pro Football Reference

Career AFL statistics
- Passing TD–INT: 118–47
- Passing yards: 7,140
- Stats at ArenaFan.com

James Michael Hold Jr. (born March 16, 1963) is an American former professional football player who was a quarterback in the National Football League (NFL) and Arena Football League (AFL). He played for the Chicago Bruisers, Tampa Bay Buccaneers, Maryland Commandos, Denver Dynamite, Sacramento Attack, Orlando Predators, Connecticut Coyotes, Arizona Rattlers and Houston ThunderBears. He later was the head coach of the Augusta Stallions, Carolina Cobras, Las Vegas Gladiators and Mahoning Valley Thunder. He played college football at Mesa Community College prior to transferring to the South Carolina Gamecocks football.

Hold made a cameo appearance in the 1998 sports comedy film The Waterboy, where he plays a quarterback for the Central Kentucky Football team.

Hold is currently the Executive Athletic Director of Newberry College.
