= Whit Taylor (American football) =

American football player (born 1960)

Profile
- Position: Quarterback

Personal information
- Born: January 8, 1960 (age 66); Shelbyville, Tennessee, U.S.
- Listed height: 5 ft 11 in (1.80 m)
- Listed weight: 185 lb (84 kg)

Career information
- College: Vanderbilt
- NFL draft: 1983: undrafted

Career history
- Michigan Panthers (1983–1984); San Antonio Gunslingers (1985); Denver Dynamite (1987)

Awards and highlights
- ArenaBowl champion (1987); Second-team All-Arena (1987); First-team All-SEC (1982); Second-team All-SEC (1981); SEC Football Legend (2003)

Career AFL statistics
- Attempts: 138
- Completions: 76
- Passing yards: 1,050
- Touchdowns: 21
- Interceptions: 8
- Stats at ArenaFan.com

Whit Taylor (born January 8, 1960) is a former college and professional football quarterback. He was an all-Southeastern Conference quarterback for Vanderbilt University from 1979–1982, a period which included a trip to the 1982 Hall of Fame Bowl. His career at Vanderbilt led in 2003 to his recognition as an SEC Football Legend.

After attempting a career in the National Football League (NFL), he became a backup quarterback for the Michigan Panthers of the United States Football League (USFL) and then became quarterback of the Denver Dynamite of the Arena Football League (AFL) in 1987. In that year he became the first player ever to pass for ten touchdowns in any professional game of American football, a record which stood for over a decade.

== Biography ==
=== Professional career ===
In 1987, Taylor lead the Denver Dynamite to a 45–16 victory over the Pittsburgh Gladiators in ArenaBowl I. Taylor threw four touchdowns during the game, three of them to future Arena Football Hall of Famer Gary Mullen.

=== After football ===
Taylor got his start in coaching at the collegiate level, serving as quarterbacks coach at the University of Tennessee at Chattanooga in 1988–1989. He worked as a high school football coach and teacher in the Middle Tennessee area at Shelbyville's Central High School, his high school alma mater.

In 2006, he left coaching to go into educational administration. He served as the Harris Middle School Assistant Principal for a few years. He was the Principal of Shelbyville Central High School. He was the vice principal of Eastside Elementary. Whit has now retired from his education career starting in the 2020–2021 school year
