= Lenny Taylor (American football) =

American football player (born 1961)

No. 84, 92
- Positions: Wide receiver, defensive back

Personal information
- Born: February 15, 1961 (age 65); Miami, Florida, U.S.
- Listed height: 5 ft 10 in (1.78 m)
- Listed weight: 185 lb (84 kg)

Career information
- High school: Miami Southridge
- College: Tennessee
- NFL draft: 1984: 12th round, 313th overall pick

Career history
- Green Bay Packers (1984); Washington Commandos (1987); Atlanta Falcons (1987); Detroit Drive (1988)

Awards and highlights
- ArenaBowl champion (1988); Second-team All-Arena (1987)

Career NFL statistics
- Receptions: 13
- Receiving yards: 179
- Touchdowns: 1
- Stats at Pro Football Reference

Career AFL statistics
- Receptions: 67
- Receiving yards: 732
- Touchdowns: 11
- Tackles: 18
- Interceptions: 1
- Stats at ArenaFan.com

Leonard Moore Taylor (born February 15, 1961) is an American former professional football player who was a wide receiver in the National Football League (NFL) and Arena Football League (AFL). He played college football for the Tennessee Volunteers.

== Biography ==
Taylor was born Leonard Moore Taylor on February 15, 1961, in Miami, Florida.

== Career ==
=== Green Bay Packers ===
Taylor was selected by the Green Bay Packers in the twelfth round of the 1984 NFL draft and played with the team that season.

=== Washington Commandos ===
After sitting out for two seasons, Taylor played for the Washington Commandos of the Arena Football League.

=== Atlanta Falcons ===
After two seasons away from the NFL, he played with the Atlanta Falcons during the 1987 NFL season as a scab during the 1987 NFL strike.

=== Detroit Drive ===
Taylor joined the Detroit Drive in 1988, helping the team win ArenaBowl II.

He played at the collegiate level at the University of Tennessee.
