= Brent Johnson (American football) =

American football player (born 1963)

No. 65, 53
- Position: Center

Personal information
- Born: May 16, 1963 (age 63); Chattanooga, Tennessee, U.S.
- Listed height: 6 ft 2 in (1.88 m)
- Listed weight: 255 lb (116 kg)

Career information
- High school: Red Bank (Red Bank, Tennessee)
- College: Chattanooga (1981–1985)
- NFL draft: 1986: undrafted

Career history
- Chicago Bruisers (1987–1988); Chicago Bears (1987)

Awards and highlights
- First-team All-Arena (1987)
- Stats at Pro Football Reference
- Stats at ArenaFan.com

Brenton Howell Johnson (born May 16, 1963) is an American former professional football center who played one season with the Chicago Bears of the National Football League. He played college football at the University of Tennessee at Chattanooga. He was also a member of the Chicago Bruisers of the Arena Football League (AFL).

== Early life ==
Brenton Howell Johnson was born on May 16, 1963, in Chattanooga, Tennessee. He played high school football at Red Bank High School in Red Bank, Tennessee and garnered all-state recognition as a senior.

== College career ==
Johnson was a four-year letterman for the Chattanooga Moccasins of the University of Tennessee at Chattanooga from 1982 to 1985. He was redshirted in 1981. He started every game for the team from 1982 to 1985, earning All-Southern Conference honors in 1984 and 1985. He was an Associated Press honorable mention All-American in 1984 and 1985 as well. He started at right guard, center, and tackle during his college career. Johnson was a team captain his senior year. He graduated from the University of Tennessee at Chattanooga with a Master's in Business Administration. He was inducted into the school's athletics hall of fame in 2011.

== Professional career ==
Johnson played in all six games for the Chicago Bruisers of the Arena Football League (AFL) during the league's inaugural 1987 season, totaling 17 solo tackles, four assisted tackles, and four sacks. He was named first-team All-Arena in 1987 as an offensive lineman/defensive lineman. He played both offense and defense during his time in the AFL as the league played under ironman rules.

On September 23, 1987, Johnson signed with the Chicago Bears of the National Football League (NFL) during the 1987 NFL players strike. He played in three games for the Bears before being released on October 19, 1987, after the strike ended. He was listed as a center while with the Bears.

Johnson returned to the Bruisers in 1988 and appeared in five games for the team that season, recording four solo tackles, one assisted tackle, one sack, one forced fumble, and one fumble recovery.

== Personal life ==
Johnson was later an account executive at BlueCross BlueShield of Tennessee after his football career.
