= Craig Walls =

American football player (born 1958)

No. 52, 54, 55, 60, 96
- Positions: Offensive lineman, defensive lineman

Personal information
- Born: December 24, 1958 (age 67); Pittsburgh, Pennsylvania, U.S.
- Listed height: 6 ft 1 in (1.85 m)
- Listed weight: 215 lb (98 kg)

Career information
- High school: Peabody (Pittsburgh)
- College: Indiana
- NFL draft: 1982: undrafted

Career history
- Pittsburgh Steelers (1982)*; Pittsburgh Maulers (1984); Denver Gold (1985); Ottawa Rough Riders (1986); Pittsburgh Gladiators (1987); Buffalo Bills (1987); Pittsburgh Gladiators (1988)
- * Offseason or practice squad member only

Awards and highlights
- 2× First-team All-Arena (1987, 1988); Arena Football Hall of Fame inductee (1998)

Career NFL statistics
- Games played: 3
- Stats at Pro Football Reference

Career AFL statistics
- Tackles: 28
- Sacks: 25
- Pass breakups: 10
- Forced fumbles: 4
- Fumble recoveries: 5
- Stats at ArenaFan.com

Craig S. Walls (born December 24, 1958) is an American former professional football player who was an offensive lineman/defensive lineman in the Arena Football League (AFL). He also played linebacker in the United States Football League (USFL) and the National Football League (NFL). He played college football at Indiana University.

In 1998, Walls was elected into the Arena Football Hall of Fame.

== College career ==
Walls attended Indiana University in Bloomington, Indiana, where he lettered a member of the football team from 1979 to 1981. Walls helped lead the Hoosiers to the 1979 Holiday Bowl. At the time of his graduation, Walls was the 3rd leading tackler in Indiana history with 342.
