= Reggie Smith (wide receiver) =

American football player (born 1956)

No. 16, 85
- Positions: Wide receiver, defensive back

Personal information
- Born: July 15, 1956 (age 70); Kinston, North Carolina, U.S.
- Listed height: 5 ft 4 in (1.63 m)
- Listed weight: 165 lb (75 kg)

Career information
- College: North Carolina Central
- NFL draft: 1980: undrafted

Career history
- Atlanta Falcons (1980–1981); Washington Federals (1983); Chicago Bruisers (1987–1989); New York Jets (1987); Albany Firebirds (1990); Orlando Predators (1991)

Awards and highlights
- 3× Second-team All-Arena (1987, 1988, 1990); First-team All-Arena (1990); Arena Football Hall of Fame (2002)

Career NFL statistics
- Punt returns: 41
- Punt return yards: 370
- Punt return avg.: 9
- Kickoff returns: 76
- Kickoff return yards: 1,715
- Kickoff return avg.: 22.6
- Stats at Pro Football Reference

Career AFL statistics
- Receptions: 150
- Receiving yards: 1,695
- Receiving TDs: 30
- Kickoff return yards: 2,699
- Kickoff return TDs: 4
- Stats at ArenaFan.com

Reggie "Super Gnat" Smith (born July 15, 1956) is a former Arena football wide receiver/defensive back in the Arena Football League (AFL). He played college football at North Carolina Central University.

In 2002, Smith was elected into the Arena Football Hall of Fame.
