= Billy Stone (American football, born 1963) =

American football player (born 1963)

No. 32
- Position: Fullback/linebacker

Personal information
- Born: February 25, 1963 (age 63)
- Listed height: 5 ft 10 in (1.78 m)
- Listed weight: 215 lb (98 kg)

Career information
- College: Adams State

Career history
- Chicago Bruisers (1987–1988)

Awards and highlights
- AFL Ironman of the Year (1987); First-team All-Arena (1987)

Career AFL statistics
- Rushes–Yards: 61–280
- Rushing TDs: 9
- Tackles: 9
- Sacks: 2
- Forced Fumbles: 1
- Stats at ArenaFan.com

William Stone (born February 25, 1963) is an American former football fullback in the Arena Football League for the Chicago Bruisers. He is also a former NFL running back for the Los Angeles Rams (Signed with the Rams as a free agent in 1985). He played college football at Adams State University. Stone was the first ever Ironman of the Year in the AFL.
