= Mike Witteck =

American football player (1964–1990)

- Witteck in 1987

No. 55
- Position: Linebacker

Personal information
- Born: February 21, 1964; Queens, New York, U.S.
- Died: March 15, 1990 (aged 26); Floral Park, New York, U.S.
- Listed height: 6 ft 2 in (1.88 m)
- Listed weight: 225 lb (102 kg)

Career information
- High school: Valley Stream North (Franklin Square, New York])
- College: Northwestern
- NFL draft: 1986: undrafted

Career history
- Washington Commandos (1987); New York Jets (1987)

Awards and highlights
- Second-team All-Arena (1987)
- Stats at Pro Football Reference
- Stats at ArenaFan.com

Michael Robert Witteck (February 21, 1964 – March 15, 1990) was an American professional football linebacker who played one season with the New York Jets of the National Football League (NFL). He played college football at Northwestern University. He was also a member of the Washington Commandos of the Arena Football League (AFL).

== Early life and college ==
Michael Robert Witteck was born on February 21, 1964, in Queens, New York. He attended Valley Stream North High School in Franklin Square, New York.

Witteck was a two-year letterman for the Northwestern Wildcats of Northwestern University from 1984 to 1985. He recorded two interceptions for 71 yards and one touchdown his senior year in 1985.

== Professional career ==
Witteck played in four games for the Washington Commandos of the Arena Football League (AFL) during the league's inaugural season in 1987, totaling 14 solo tackles, four assisted tackles , two sacks, four pass breakups, and one blocked kick. He was a fullback/linebacker during his time in the AFL as the league played under ironman rules. Witteck was named second-team All-Arena for his performance during the 1987 season.

On September 23, 1987, Witteck signed with the New York Jets during the 1987 NFL players strike. He played in all three strike games for the Jets before being released on October 19, 1987, after the strike ended. After his release, Witteck said he had no regrets and that he would be going to Hawaii for a vacation.

== Personal life ==
Witteck died on March 15, 1990, in Floral Park, New York. The Michael Witteck Memorial MVP award was established at Valley Stream North High School in 1990.
