= George Miller (American football) =

American football coach

Coaching career (HC unless noted)
- 1906: Kansas Wesleyan

Head coaching record
- Overall: 0–1

George Miller was an American football coach. He was the second head football coach at Kansas Wesleyan University in Salina, Kansas, serving for one season, in 1906, and compiling a record of 0–1.
