= Bob Harrison (American football coach) =

American football player and coach (1941–2022)

Biographical details
- Born: September 9, 1941; Cleveland, Ohio, U.S.
- Died: April 15, 2022 (aged 80)

Playing career
- 1961–1963: Kent State
- Position(s): End

Coaching career (HC unless noted)
- 1964–1966: John Adams HS (asst.)
- 1967–1968: John Adams HS
- 1969–1970: Kent State (DL)
- 1971–1973: Iowa (OE/WR)
- 1974: Cornell (OL)
- 1975–1976: NC State (TE/OT)
- 1977–1982: Tennessee (WR)
- 1983–1986: Atlanta Falcons (WR)
- 1987: Washington Commandos
- 1988–1991: Georgia (WR)
- 1992–1993: Pittsburgh Steelers (WR)
- 1994–1996: Boston College (WR)

Administrative career (AD unless noted)
- 1998–c. 2011: Atlanta Falcons (scout)

Accomplishments and honors

Awards
- Second-team All-Mid-American Conference (1963); NFC Scout of the Year (2011)

Robert Harrison (September 9, 1941 – April 15, 2022) was an American football player and coach. He played college football at Kent State and later served as a coach for John Adams High School, Kent State, Iowa, Cornell, NC State, Tennessee, the Atlanta Falcons, the Washington Commandos, Georgia, the Pittsburgh Steelers and Boston College.

Upon being hired by the Washington Commandos in 1987, Harrison became the second black head coach in modern professional football history (after Willie Wood).

== Early life and education ==
Harrison was born on September 9, 1941, in Cleveland, Ohio. He attended John Adams High School and joined Kent State University in 1960. He earned varsity letters in three years (1961–1963) and recorded 27 receptions for 350 yards as an end on the football team. As a senior, Harrison was named second-team All-Mid-American Conference. After graduating, he attempted a professional football career but a knee injury ended his playing career.

== Coaching career ==
In 1964, Harrison accepted a position as an assistant coach at John Adams High School. He served as head coach in his final two years with the school (1967–1968).

In 1969, Harrison became an assistant coach at his alma mater, Kent State University. He served in that position for two years before being named offensive ends and receivers coach at Iowa in January 1971. After serving three years at Iowa, Harrison was named offensive line coach at Cornell in January 1974.

In January 1975, Harrison was named assistant coach at North Carolina State. After two years there as offensive tackles coach and tight ends coach, Harrison was hired as Tennessee wide receivers coach in 1977. He spent six years with Tennessee before being named wide receivers coach of the Atlanta Falcons in the National Football League (NFL) on February 16, 1983. After four seasons with the Falcons, he was fired in December 1986 along with several other of the coaches.

In 1987, Harrison accepted a position as head coach of the Washington Commandos in the Arena Football League (AFL). The move made him the second black head coach in modern professional football history, after Willie Wood. Washington compiled a 2–4 record with Harrison as head coach.

In March 1988, it was announced that Harrison had been hired by Georgia to become the wide receivers coach. He served with them until being hired by the Pittsburgh Steelers in 1992 to coach the receivers. He was fired in January 1994. Harrison was later named receivers coach at Boston College, where he served from 1994 to 1996.

== Later life and death ==
Harrison later served as an Atlanta Falcons scout, being named NFC Scout of the Year in 2011.

Harrison died on April 15, 2022, at the age of 80, after a long illness.
