= Gary Mullen (American football) =

American football player (born 1963)

No. 80, 30, 1
- Positions: Wide receiver, defensive back

Personal information
- Born: February 1, 1963 (age 63); McKeesport, Pennsylvania, U.S.
- Listed height: 5 ft 11 in (1.80 m)
- Listed weight: 174 lb (79 kg)

Career information
- High school: Clairton (Clairton, Pennsylvania)
- College: West Virginia
- NFL draft: 1985: undrafted

Career history
- Detroit Lions (1985)*; Pittsburgh Steelers (1986)*; Denver Dynamite (1987); Chicago Bears (1987); Los Angeles Cobras (1988); Detroit Drive (1989–1992); Cincinnati Rockers (1993); Milwaukee Mustangs (1995)
- * Offseason or practice squad member only

Awards and highlights
- 4× ArenaBowl champion (1987, 1989, 1990, 1992); ArenaBowl MVP (1987); 3× First-team All-Arena (1987, 1988, 1990); 2× Second-team All-Arena (1990, 1991); AFL All-Star (1993); Arena Football Hall of Fame (1998); All ArenaBowl Team (1999); AFL Second-team 15th Anniversary Team (2001); AFL 20 Greatest Players - #17 (2006); AFL 25 Greatest Players - #25 (2012)

Career NFL statistics
- Receptions: 2
- Receiving yards: 33
- Stats at Pro Football Reference

Career AFL statistics
- Receptions: 254
- Receiving yards: 4,014
- Receiving touchdowns: 74
- Tackles: 123
- Interceptions: 7
- Stats at ArenaFan.com

Gary Mullen (born February 1, 1963) is an American former professional football player who was a wide receiver and defensive back for eight seasons for the Denver Dynamite, Chicago Bears, Los Angeles Cobras, Detroit Drive, Cincinnati Rockers, and Milwaukee Mustangs. He was elected into the Arena Football Hall of Fame in 1998. He played college football for the West Virginia Mountaineers.

== Early life ==
Mullen attended Clairton High School in Clairton, Pennsylvania. While at Clairton, Mullen was a standout member of the football and basketball teams. Playing under the guidance of Head Coach Pat Risha, Mullen served as the quarterback and a defensive back for the Bears' football team. As a senior in 1980, Mullen lead the team to the WPIAL Class A football championship game, with a 29–8 victory over Shenango High School, but the Bears would lose in the championship game to Laurel High School. After the team's title run, Mullen was named The Pittsburgh Press Class A Player of the Year. As a senior on the basketball team, Mullen help lead the Bears to a runner up finish in the WPIAL Championship game. Mullen was recruited by West Virginia and Minnesota for football, and chose West Virginia because he stated, "it wasn't too far from home and the program was rebuilding."

== College career ==
Mullen attended West Virginia University after high school, where was a member of the Mountaineers football team from 1981 to 1984. After his freshman season, Mullen considered a transfer, but decided to stick it out after speaking with Risha. Mullen spent two years as a reserve wide receiver for the Mountaineers, but he continued to work hard to earn more playing time. Mullen earned playing time in 11 games during the 1983 season, amassing 19 receptions for 343 yards and three touchdowns. Mullen was also utilized as a kickoff returner, returning 12 kicks for 237 yards. Mullen's senior year at West Virginia was his most productive statistically, as he caught 31 passes for 557 yards and three touchdowns. In total, Mullen amassed 80 receptions for 1,332 yards and six touchdowns during his collegiate career. Gary was also part of three Mountaineer bowl game victories: the Peach Bowl in 1981, the Hall of Fame Classic Bowl in 1983, and the Bluebonnet Bowl in 1984.

== Professional career ==
After not hearing his name called during the 1985 NFL draft, Mullen was signed by the Detroit Lions, but was released before the season began. In the summer of 1986, Mullen signed with the Pittsburgh Steelers, but he was unable to shake a bad case of the flu; Mullen left the Steelers by his own will. Mullen made one final attempt to continue his football career, when he attended a tryout for the upstart Arena Football League. Going into the tryout, Mullen wanted to join the Pittsburgh Gladiators, as they were close to where he grew up.

=== Denver Dynamite ===
Just one day before Mullen was ready to quit on his football dream and join the U.S. Army, he received a phone call inviting him to try out to play for the Denver Dynamite of the Arena Football League. Mullen became a focal point for the Dynamite offense, but with the Arena Football League then making players play both ways, he was also a key player on defense. Mullen didn't take the lack of a defensive background as an excuse to not play hard on defense. Mullen had an outstanding season for the Dynamite, leading the team in receptions (26), receiving yards (502) and receiving touchdowns (11). The Dynamite tied for the best record in the AFL, which earned them a spot in ArenaBowl I. Mullen won ArenaBowl I MVP during his team's 45–16 victory over the Pittsburgh Gladiators.

=== Chicago Bears ===
Mullen's play during the 1987 season earned him a chance to play for the Chicago Bears during the 1987 NFL strike. He played in all three games that the strike lasted, making two career receptions for 33 yards.

=== Los Angeles Cobras ===
After the Dynamite suspended operations during the 1988 season, Mullen went to play for the expansion Los Angeles Cobras as they owned the rights to all Dynamite players. Mullen's one year of experience was heavily leaned on by the Cobras, and Mullen enjoyed being the main target for the Cobras. Mullen lead the Cobras with 61 receptions for 823-yards and 17 touchdowns. The Cobras finished in 4th place, which was good enough to earn them the 4th seed in the playoffs. They were matched against the 1 seed, Chicago Bruisers, with a chance to make it to ArenaBowl II. The Cobras lost 16–29, while Mullen paced the offense with 7 receptions for 78-yards and 1 touchdown. After the season ended, the Cobras, as well as other teams, folded and the league playing again in 1989 looked in doubt. When they league announced that they would be playing in May, Mullen said that he would not play in 1989 due to all the pay cuts he would be receiving.

=== Detroit Drive ===
After sitting out the 1989 regular season to get himself more established at his full-time job, Mullen signed with the Detroit Drive during their playoff run. The Drive won ArenaBowl III. Mullen returned to the Drive in 1991, and teamed with fellow WR/DB George LaFrance and QB Art Schlichter, the Drive's offense stood as one of the most challenging to defend. He helped the Drive to a three-peat with a 37-yard touchdown reception, when the Drive defeated the Dallas Texans 51-27 in ArenaBowl IV. In 1992, the Drive were again on their way to the ArenaBowl, this time they faced the Orlando Predators.

=== Cincinnati Rockers ===
Mullen was acquired by the Cincinnati Rockers for future considerations in 1993.

=== Milwaukee Mustangs ===
When the Milwaukee Mustangs were formed in 1994, Mullen was selected in their expansion draft. Mullen signed a contract with the Mustangs a few days later.

== Personal ==
Both of Gary's brothers played professional football. His younger brother Keith Mullen, played arena football in 1991 with the Columbus Thunderbolts, while his older brother Davlin Mullen played for the New York Jets.
