= Russell Hairston =

American football player (born 1964)

No. 27, 85
- Position: Wide receiver / Defensive back

Personal information
- Born: February 10, 1964 (age 62); Greenbelt, Maryland, U.S.
- Listed height: 6 ft 3 in (1.91 m)
- Listed weight: 205 lb (93 kg)

Career information
- College: Kentucky
- NFL draft: 1986: undrafted

Career history
- New England Patriots (1986)*; Pittsburgh Gladiators (1987); Pittsburgh Steelers (1987); Minnesota Vikings (1988)*; Pittsburgh Gladiators (1988); New England Steamrollers (1988); Washington Commandos (1990)
- * Offseason or practice squad member only

Awards and highlights
- AFL MVP (1987); First Team All-Arena – WR/DB (1987)

Career NFL statistics
- Games played: 3
- Receptions: 2
- Yards: 16
- Touchdowns: 1
- Stats at Pro Football Reference

Career AFL statistics
- Receptions-Yards: 116–1,766
- Receiving TDs: 29
- Tackles-Sacks: 50–0
- Touchdowns: 1
- Interceptions: 5
- Stats at ArenaFan.com

Russell Hairston (born February 10, 1964) is an American former professional football player who was a wide receiver in the National Football League (NFL) for the Pittsburgh Steelers. He also played in the Arena Football League (AFL) for the Pittsburgh Gladiators, New England Steamrollers and Washington Commandos. He played college football for the Kentucky Wildcats. Hairston was the first ever MVP of the AFL.
