= Arena Football Hall of Fame =

Hall of fame of the Arena Football League

- Established: 1998
- Website: www.arenafootball.com/hallfame

The Arena Football Hall of Fame was the official Hall of Fame of the Arena Football League (AFL). The inaugural class was announced in 1998 and the Hall was not formally organized until 2011. Prior to 2011, there were four classes: 1998–2000 and then another in 2002. The voting process consisted of fans and current Hall of Fame members voting on the finalists. The finalists were selected by the League Office in which they collected ballots from the Arena Football Hall of Fame Advisory Board, a group which consisted of former players, executives, journalists and media personnel with a long-time involvement in the league. After its decline in 2015, the hall stopped inducting new classes. The league folded for a second time in 2019. However, after the league's closure, ArenaFan, a long-running fan site, announced it had taken over operations of the Arena Football Hall of Fame.

== Qualifications ==
In order to be nominated for the Arena Football Hall of Fame, a candidate must have met at least one of four criteria (as of 2015, depending upon whether he is being considered as a player, a coach, or a contributor). A player who had played after the 1989 season must have played a minimum of three seasons. A player had to be retired for a minimum of three full seasons. A coach must have been active for a minimum of five seasons but did not need to be retired. There was no minimum number of seasons required for contributors but rather contribution to the significant advancement of the AFL in general.

== Location ==
Even before ArenaFan's takeover, there was no physical location for the Arena Football Hall of Fame. However, within the Pro Football Hall of Fame, a small exhibit features the history of the Arena Football League.

== Ceremony and Hall of Fame Game ==
Much like the Pro Football Hall of Fame, the Arena Football League had a weekend dedicated to the inductees and during a selected Hall of Fame Game the inductees would partake in a Hall of Fame ceremony. The ceremony took place prior to the game and would feature highlights as well as speeches from each of the inductees. In later years, Hall of Fame Games were aired on CBS Sports Network prior to the termination of the league's agreement with CBSN following the 2018 season.

== Inductees ==
The list is complete up to date with the 2014 Hall of Fame class.

Biographies and statistics can be referenced at the Hall of Fame web site.
Inductee	Class	Position	Team(s)	Years
Dwayne Dixon	1998	Wide receiver/Defensive back	Washington Commandos	1987
Dwayne Dixon	1998	Wide receiver/Defensive back	Detroit Drive	1988–1991
Jim Foster	1998	League Founder/Executive, Commissioner, Team Owner/President	N/A	N/A
Jim Foster	1998	League Founder/Executive, Commissioner, Team Owner/President	Commissioner	1987–1992
Jim Foster	1998	League Founder/Executive, Commissioner, Team Owner/President	Iowa Barnstormers	1995–2001
Jerry Kurz	1998	League Co-founder/Executive, Commissioner, President	N/A	N/A
Jerry Kurz	1998	League Co-founder/Executive, Commissioner, President	CEO (AF2)	2004–2009
Jerry Kurz	1998	League Co-founder/Executive, Commissioner, President	Commissioner	2010–2014
Jerry Kurz	1998	League Co-founder/Executive, Commissioner, President	President	2015–present
Tim Marcum	1998	Head coach	Denver Dynamite	1987
Tim Marcum	1998	Head coach	Detroit Drive	1988–1989, 1991–1993
Tim Marcum	1998	Head coach	Tampa Bay Storm	1995–2010
Tim Marcum	1998	Head coach	Kansas City Command	2011
Tim Marcum	1998	Head coach	New Orleans VooDoo (AHC)	2012
Tim Marcum	1998	Head coach	Orlando Predators (AHC/DC)	2013
Gary Mullen	1998	Wide receiver/Defensive back	Denver Dynamite	1987
Gary Mullen	1998	Wide receiver/Defensive back	Los Angeles Cobras	1988
Gary Mullen	1998	Wide receiver/Defensive back	Detroit Drive	1989–1992
Gary Mullen	1998	Wide receiver/Defensive back	Cincinnati Rockers	1993
Gary Mullen	1998	Wide receiver/Defensive back	Milwaukee Mustangs	1995
Tate Randle	1998	Defensive Specialist	Detroit Drive	1988, 1990–1992
Alvin Rettig	1998	Fullback/Linebacker	Detroit Drive	1988–1993
Craig Walls	1998	Offensive lineman/Defensive lineman	Pittsburgh Gladiators	1987–1988
Jay Gruden	1999	Quarterback	Tampa Bay Storm	1991–1996
Jay Gruden	1999	Quarterback	Orlando Predators	2002–2003
Durwood "Rock" Roquemore	1999	Defensive Specialist	Chicago Bruisers	1987–1988
Durwood "Rock" Roquemore	1999	Defensive Specialist	Albany Firebirds	1990
Durwood "Rock" Roquemore	1999	Defensive Specialist	Orlando Predators	1991–1996
Jon Roehlk	1999	Offensive lineman/Defensive lineman	Washington Commandos	1987
Jon Roehlk	1999	Offensive lineman/Defensive lineman	Detroit Drive	1988–1993
Jon Roehlk	1999	Offensive lineman/Defensive lineman	Miami Hooters	1994
Jon Roehlk	1999	Offensive lineman/Defensive lineman	Iowa Barnstormers	1995–1996
Gary Vitto	1999	General Manager	Detroit Drive	1988–1993
Ben Bennett	2000	Quarterback	Chicago Bruisers	1988–1989
Ben Bennett	2000	Quarterback	Dallas Texans	1990
Ben Bennett	2000	Quarterback	Orlando Predators	1991–1995
Ben Bennett	2000	Quarterback	San Jose SaberCats	1996
Ben Bennett	2000	Quarterback	Portland Forest Dragons	1997
Carl Aikens	2000	Wide receiver/Defensive back	Chicago Bruisers	1988–1989
Carl Aikens	2000	Wide receiver/Defensive back	Dallas Texans	1990–1991
Carl Aikens	2000	Wide receiver/Defensive back	Orlando Predators	1992–1993
Carl Aikens	2000	Wide receiver/Defensive back	Milwaukee Mustangs	1994
Hercules "Herkie" Walls	2000	Wide receiver/Defensive back	Orlando Predators	1991–1996
Joe March	2000	Offensive lineman/Defensive lineman	Denver Dynamite	1991
Joe March	2000	Offensive lineman/Defensive lineman	Sacramento Attack	1992
Joe March	2000	Offensive lineman/Defensive lineman	Milwaukee Mustangs	1993
Joe March	2000	Offensive lineman/Defensive lineman	Tampa Bay Storm	1993–1996
Joe March	2000	Offensive lineman/Defensive lineman	Nashville Kats	1997
Perry Moss	2000	Head coach	Chicago Bruisers	1988
Perry Moss	2000	Head coach	Detroit Drive	1990
Perry Moss	2000	Head coach	Orlando Predators	1991–1997
Glenn Mazula	2000	Team Owner	Albany/Indiana Firebirds	1990–2002
Danny White	2002	Head coach	Arizona Rattlers	1992–2004
Danny White	2002	Head coach	Utah Blaze	2006–2008
Mike Ilitch	2002	Team Owner	Detroit Drive	1988–1993
John Corker	2002	Offensive lineman/Defensive lineman	Detroit Drive	1988–1993
John Corker	2002	Offensive lineman/Defensive lineman	Miami Hooters	1994–1995
Fred Gayles	2002	Wide receiver/Defensive back	Denver Dynamite	1989
Fred Gayles	2002	Wide receiver/Defensive back	Albany Firebirds	1990–1997
Fred Gayles	2002	Wide receiver/Defensive back	New York CityHawks	1997
Fred Gayles	2002	Wide receiver/Defensive back	Grand Rapids Rampage	1998
Reggie Smith	2002	Offensive Specialist	Chicago Bruisers	1987–1989
Reggie Smith	2002	Offensive Specialist	Albany Firebirds	1990
Reggie Smith	2002	Offensive Specialist	Orlando Predators	1991
Barry Wagner	2011	Wide receiver/Defensive back	Orlando Predators	1992–1999, 2007
Barry Wagner	2011	Wide receiver/Defensive back	San Jose SaberCats	2000–2006
George LaFrance	2011	Offensive Specialist	Detroit Drive	1988–1993
George LaFrance	2011	Offensive Specialist	Tampa Bay Storm	1994–1999
George LaFrance	2011	Offensive Specialist	New Jersey Red Dogs	2000
Hunkie Cooper	2011	Wide receiver/Linebacker	Arizona Rattlers	1993–2005
Eddie Brown	2011	Offensive Specialist	Albany/Indiana Firebirds	1994–2003
Sylvester Bembery	2011	Offensive lineman/Defensive lineman	New England Steamrollers	1988
Sylvester Bembery	2011	Offensive lineman/Defensive lineman	Albany Firebirds	1990–1993
Sylvester Bembery	2011	Offensive lineman/Defensive lineman	Tampa Bay Storm	1994–1999, 2001
Sylvester Bembery	2011	Offensive lineman/Defensive lineman	Buffalo Destroyers	2000
Kurt Warner	2011	Quarterback	Iowa Barnstormers	1995–1997
Stevie Thomas	2011	Wide receiver/Linebacker	Tampa Bay Storm	1991–1999
Stevie Thomas	2011	Wide receiver/Linebacker	Orlando Predators	2000
Stevie Thomas	2011	Wide receiver/Linebacker	New Jersey Gladiators	2001
Sam Hernandez	2011	Offensive lineman/Defensive lineman	Charlotte Rage	1992
Sam Hernandez	2011	Offensive lineman/Defensive lineman	Las Vegas Sting/Anaheim Piranhas	1994–1997
Sam Hernandez	2011	Offensive lineman/Defensive lineman	San Jose SaberCats	1998–2005
Darren Arbet	2011	Head coach	San Jose SaberCats	1999–2008, 2010–present
Gene Nudo	2011	Executive	Chicago Bruisers/AFL League Office/Arizona Rattlers/Dallas Vigilantes/ Chicago Rush	1987–2011
Sherdrick Bonner	2012	Quarterback	Arizona Rattlers	1993–2007
Sherdrick Bonner	2012	Quarterback	Chicago Rush	2008
Mike Dailey	2012	Head coach	Albany/Indiana Firebirds	1997–2003
Mike Dailey	2012	Head coach	Colorado Crush	2004–2008
Clint Dolezel	2012	Quarterback	Milwaukee Mustangs	1995–1996
Clint Dolezel	2012	Quarterback	Texas Terror/Houston ThunderBears	1997–1999
Clint Dolezel	2012	Quarterback	Grand Rapids Rampage	2001–2003
Clint Dolezel	2012	Quarterback	Las Vegas Gladiators	2004–2005
Clint Dolezel	2012	Quarterback	Dallas Desperados	2006–2008
Randy Gatewood	2012	Wide receiver/Defensive back	Arizona Rattlers	1996–2007
Mike Hohensee	2012	Head coach	Washington Commandos	1990
Mike Hohensee	2012	Head coach	Albany Firebirds	1994–1996
Mike Hohensee	2012	Head coach	Anaheim Piranhas	1997
Mike Hohensee	2012	Head coach	New England Sea Wolves	1999–2000
Mike Hohensee	2012	Head coach	Chicago Rush	2001–2008, 2010
Mike Hohensee	2012	Head coach	Peoria Pirates (AF2)	2009
Mike Hohensee	2012	Head coach	Philadelphia Soul	2011
Mike Hohensee	2012	Head coach	Iowa Barnstormers	2012–2014
Mike Hohensee	2012	Head coach	Portland Thunder	2015
William Niro	2012	League Co-founder/Executive	N/A	N/A
Cory Fleming	2013	Wide receiver/Linebacker	Nashville Kats	1994–1995, 2006
Cory Fleming	2013	Wide receiver/Linebacker	Carolina Cobras	2002
Cory Fleming	2013	Wide receiver/Linebacker	Orlando Predators	2003–2005
Darryl Hammond	2013	Wide receiver/Linebacker	Albany Firebirds	1991–1994
Darryl Hammond	2013	Wide receiver/Linebacker	St. Louis Stampede	1995–1996
Darryl Hammond	2013	Wide receiver/Linebacker	Nashville Kats	1997–2001, 2005–2006
Darryl Hammond	2013	Wide receiver/Linebacker	Georgia Force	2003–2004
Darryl Hammond	2013	Wide receiver/Linebacker	Austin Wranglers	2004
Greg Hopkins	2013	Wide receiver/Linebacker	Albany/Indiana Firebirds	1996–2001
Greg Hopkins	2013	Wide receiver/Linebacker	Los Angeles Avengers	2002–2006
Bob McMillen	2013	Fullback/Linebacker	Arizona Rattlers	1995–2001
Bob McMillen	2013	Fullback/Linebacker	San Jose SaberCats	2001–2002
Bob McMillen	2013	Fullback/Linebacker	Chicago Rush	2003–2007
Carl Paganelli	2013	Official/Adviser/Contributor	N/A	N/A
Lawrence Samuels	2013	Wide receiver/Linebacker	Tampa Bay Storm	1994–2000, 2002–2010
Lawrence Samuels	2013	Wide receiver/Linebacker	New Jersey Gladiators	2001
Andre Bowden	2014	Fullback/Linebacker	Tampa Bay Storm	1991–1993, 1997–2001, 2003–2004
Andre Bowden	2014	Fullback/Linebacker	Carolina Cobras	2002
Damian Harrell	2014	Wide receiver	New England Sea Wolves/Toronto Phantoms	1999–2002
Damian Harrell	2014	Wide receiver	Colorado Crush	2003–2007
Damian Harrell	2014	Wide receiver	Chicago Rush	2008
Damian Harrell	2014	Wide receiver	Milwaukee Mustangs	2010–2011
Kyle Moore-Brown	2014	Offensive lineman/Defensive lineman	Albany/Indiana Firebirds	1995–2003
Kyle Moore-Brown	2014	Offensive lineman/Defensive lineman	Colorado Crush	2004–2008
Omarr Smith	2014	Wide receiver/Defensive back	San Jose SaberCats	2000–2002, 2004–2008
Omarr Smith	2014	Wide receiver/Defensive back	Tampa Bay Storm	2003

Class of 2015 Finalists:

- James Baron: Offensive lineman/Defensive lineman for the Nashville Kats from 1997 to 2001 and 2005 to 2007, and the Chicago Rush from 2002 to 2004 and 2008
- Craig Bornemeier: Executive
- Siaha Burley: Offensive Specialist for the Orlando Predators from 2001 to 2002, the Los Angeles Avengers from 2003, the Arizona Rattlers from 2004 to 2005, 2008, and 2010, and the Utah Blaze from 2006 to 2007
- B. J. Cohen: Offensive lineman/Defensive lineman for the Orlando Predators from 1999 to 2002 and 2008, the Tampa Bay Storm from 2003, the New Orleans VooDoo from 2004 to 2005, and the Kansas City Brigade from 2006 to 2007
- Mark Grieb: Quarterback for the Anaheim Piranhas from 1997, the Milwaukee Mustangs from 1997, and the San Jose SaberCats from 1999 to 2008 and 2011 to 2012
- Jay Gruden: Head coach for the Orlando Predators from 1998 to 2001 and 2004 to 2008. Gruden is already inducted for his playing career and thus would be the first to be inducted twice as the hall is currently configured.
- Kevin Guy: Head coach for the Tennessee Valley Vipers (AF2) from 2002 to 2004, the Rio Grande Valley Dorados (AF2) from 2005, and the Arizona Rattlers from 2008–present
- Kenny McEntyre: Defensive Specialist for the Orlando Predators from 1998 to 2006 and 2008 to 2012, and the Kansas City Brigade from 2007
- Steve Papin: Offensive Specialist for the San Jose SaberCats from 1997 to 2001, the New York Dragons from 2002 to 2003, and the San Diego Riptide (AF2) from 2003
- Will Pettis: Wide receiver/Defensive back for the Pensacola Barracudas (AF2) from 2002, the Dallas Desperados from 2003 to 2008, and the Dallas Vigilantes from 2010

These were the finalists for the 2015 Hall of Fame class; however, this was the year that began the decline of the league until its second bankruptcy in 2019. No future Hall of Fame announcements have been made since 2015.

=== AF2 Hall of Fame inductees ===
With the dissolvement of the AF2 developmental league, there was a single class of ten members inducted into the AF2 Hall of Fame. While this league was owned and run by the AFL, a separate Hall of Fame was created. AFL and AF2 creators Jim Foster and Jerry Kurz are the only previous members of both Halls. This Hall was designed to recognize individuals who significantly impacted the AF2. While some members have been involved with AFL teams, this group was inducted based only on their contributions to the AF2. No members have been inducted beyond the inaugural class.

Inductee	Class	Position	Team(s)	Years
Mitch Allner	2009	Wide receiver/Defensive back, Head coach	Quad City Steamwheelers	2000
Mitch Allner	2009	Wide receiver/Defensive back, Head coach	Iowa Barnstormers	2001
Mitch Allner	2009	Wide receiver/Defensive back, Head coach	Tulsa Talons	2002–? 2007–2011 (HC)
Jim Foster	2009	League Founder/Executive, Team Owner/President	N/A	2000–2009
Jim Foster	2009	League Founder/Executive, Team Owner/President	Iowa Barnstormers	1995–2001
Jim Foster	2009	League Founder/Executive, Team Owner/President	Quad City Steamwheelers	2000–2009
Skip Foster	2009	Head coach	Tulsa Talons	2000–2003
Skip Foster	2009	Head coach	Austin Wranglers (AFL)	2004–2006
Kevin Guy	2009	Head coach	New Jersey Red Dogs (AFL)	2003
Kevin Guy	2009	Head coach	Tennessee Valley Vipers	2002–2004
Kevin Guy	2009	Head coach	Rio Grande Valley Dorados	2005
Kevin Guy	2009	Head coach	Arizona Rattlers (AFL / IFL)	2008–present
Rich Ingold	2009	Head coach	Quad City Steamwheelers	2002–2004
Rich Ingold	2009	Head coach	Wilkes-Barre/Scranton Pioneers	2006–2009
Rich Ingold	2009	Head coach	Dallas Vigilantes (AFL)	2010
Jerry Kurz	2009	League Co-founder/Executive, Commissioner, President	N/A	2000–2009
Jerry Kurz	2009	League Co-founder/Executive, Commissioner, President	CEO	2004–2009
Dan Newman	2009	Owner/Team president, Team chairman, League executive	Bossier-Shreveport Battle Wings	2003–2010
Dan Newman	2009	Owner/Team president, Team chairman, League executive	New Orleans VooDoo (AFL)	2011–2015
Jim Foster	2009	Offensive specialist	Carolina Cobras (AFL)	2002
Jim Foster	2009	Offensive specialist	Memphis Xplorers	2003–2005
Jim Foster	2009	Offensive specialist	Las Vegas Gladiators (AFL)	2006–2007
Matthew Sauk	2009	Quarterback	Tennessee Valley Vipers	2001, 2003
Matthew Sauk	2009	Quarterback	Los Angeles Avengers (AFL)	2001
Matthew Sauk	2009	Quarterback	Louisville Fire	2004–2005
Matthew Sauk	2009	Quarterback	Philadelphia Soul (AFL)	2006
Matthew Sauk	2009	Quarterback	Grand Rapids Rampage (AFL)	2007
Matthew Sauk	2009	Quarterback	Arizona Rattlers (AFL)	2008
Craig Strickland	2009	Quarterback	Tulsa Talons	2000–2001, 2003
Craig Strickland	2009	Quarterback	Dallas Desperados (AFL)	2004
Craig Strickland	2009	Quarterback	Oklahoma City Yard Dawgz	2004–2006

== Pro Football Hall of Fame ==
Joe DeLamielleure was the first Pro Football Hall of Fame inductee to ever play with an Arena Football Team; as an apparent publicity stunt, he played two games for the Charlotte Rage in the 1992 season, seven years after he had retired from professional football.

Kurt Warner, who played three seasons with the Iowa Barnstormers from 1995 to 1997 was inducted into the Arena Football Hall of Fame in 2011. He was the first player with substantial arena football experience to make the Pro Football Hall of Fame, as well as the first to be inducted into both halls. Warner was inducted into the Pro Football Hall of Fame in 2017.

The ownership group of the Colorado Crush has also been inducted: John Elway was inducted as a player in 2004, while Pat Bowlen was inducted as an owner in 2019. Both Elway and Bowlen were inducted almost entirely for their contributions to the NFL's Denver Broncos.

== See also ==
- Pro Football Hall of Fame
- Canadian Football Hall of Fame
- Indoor Football League Hall of Fame
