= Tim Marcum =

American football player and coach (1944–2013)

Profile
- Position: Quarterback

Personal information
- Born: February 10, 1944; Roscoe, Texas, U.S.
- Died: December 5, 2013 (aged 69); Citrus County, Florida, U.S.

Career information
- High school: Snyder (Snyder, Texas)
- College: McMurry
- NFL draft: 1967: undrafted

Career history
- Ranger (1976–1977) Assistant coach; Ranger (1978–1979) Head coach; Rice (1980–1983) Defensive backs coach; San Antonio Gunslingers (1984–1985) Defensive coordinator & linebackers coach; Denver Dynamite (1987) Head coach; Detroit Drive (1988–1989) Head coach; Florida (1990) Inside linebackers coach; New York/New Jersey Knights (1991–1992) Assistant head coach; Detroit Drive (1991–1993) Head coach; Tampa Bay Storm (1995–2010) Head coach; New Orleans VooDoo (2012) Assistant head coach; Orlando Predators (2013) Assistant head coach & defensive cooridinator

Awards and highlights
- 2× AFL Coach of the Year (1987 & 1998); 7× ArenaBowl champion (1987, 1988, 1989, 1992, 1995, 1996 & 2003); AFL Hall of Fame Inductee (1998)

Head coaching record
- Regular season: 184–87 (.679)
- Postseason: 27–12 (.692)
- Career: 211–99 (.681)

Tim Marcum (February 10, 1944 – December 5, 2013) was an American football coach, best known for his long and successful career in the Arena Football League (AFL). He was the head coach of the AFL's Denver Dynamite in 1987, the Detroit Drive from 1988 to 1992 and the Tampa Bay Storm from 1995 to 2010. Marcum also served as an assistant coach in the NJCAA, NCAA, United States Football League, World Football League, NFL and the Arena Football League.

Marcum head coached in eleven ArenaBowl championship games, winning seven. Marcum was one of two men to win seven ArenaBowls (the other being Omarr Smith, who was a member of Marcum's 2003 championship team); and the only man to win seven ArenaBowls as a head coach (no other head coach won more than four). He was inducted into the AFL Hall of Fame in 1998. Marcum was one of the most successful coaches in the history of the sport of indoor football, and is considered the greatest coach in the Arena Football League's 32-year history.

== Early life and education ==
Marcum was born February 10, 1944, in Roscoe, Texas. He attended Snyder High School.

Marcum attended McMurry University in Abilene, Texas, where he quarterbacked the Indians. Under the guidance of future College Football Hall of Fame coach Grant Teaff, Marcum started the 1965 and 67 seasons for the Indians, leading them to a 5–13–2 record.

== Career ==
Following a largely unremarkable early coaching career serving primarily as a collegiate and USFL assistant, Marcum became the coach of the Denver Dynamite, one of the original AFL franchises, and led them to the championship of the first-ever ArenaBowl, but the team suspended operations after its initial season in 1987. Not waiting for the Dynamite to resume operations (which they later did for three years starting in 1989), he then went on to coach the Detroit Drive for that team's entire existence save 1990, when he was an assistant with the University of Florida. This team became the AFL's first dynasty, playing in the ArenaBowl during every year of its existence. However, this team likewise folded, but Marcum's success with them became the basis for his hiring and tenure with the most successful Arena team ever, the Tampa Bay Storm, where he achieved his greatest fame, and arguably the greatest fame of any Arena coach (as of 2014), winning four more ArenaBowl championships, including another back-to-back run (1995 and 1996).

On February 17, 2011, Marcum resigned as head coach and general manager of the Tampa Bay Storm after 15 seasons with the team, less than a month before the season was set to begin. His resignation came after it was revealed that in a deposition given in a lawsuit between himself and former team owner Robert Nucci, Marcum had admitted to receiving and forwarding via his work e-mail account material that was pornographic and racially insensitive. Marcum stated that he would not be able to go forward as head coach as the controversy would cause too much of a distraction. It was reported that Marcum may have been fired had he not resigned. Marcum went on to serve as an assistant coach with the New Orleans Voodoo in 2012 and the Storm's fiercest rivals, the Orlando Predators, in 2013.

== Death ==
On December 5, 2013, Marcum died at a hospice in Citrus County, Florida. The Arena Football League dedicated its 2014 Hall of Fame Weekend to Marcum's memory, with each player uniform bearing a navy and gold "TM" patch.

== See also ==
- List of professional gridiron football coaches with 200 wins
