= 1987 Arena Football League season =

- League: Arena Football League
- Sport: Arena football
- Duration: June 19, 1987 – August 1, 1987

Regular season
- Season champions: Pittsburgh Gladiators
- Season MVP: Russell Hairston, PIT

ArenaBowl I
- Champions: Denver Dynamite
- Runners-up: Pittsburgh Gladiators
- Finals MVP: Gary Mullen, DEN

AFL seasons
- 1988 →

AFL teams

The 1987 Arena Football League season was the first season, also known as the "demonstration season", of the Arena Football League (AFL). The league champions were the Denver Dynamite, who defeated the Pittsburgh Gladiators in ArenaBowl I.

== Events ==
The Arena Football League played its inaugural season in 1987 with four teams to introduce the sport to the American public. The Chicago Bruisers, Denver Dynamite, Pittsburgh Gladiators and Washington Commandos comprised the four-team league that ran a schedule from June 19 to August 1. The AFL drew an impressive average of 11,000 fans per game and TV coverage on ESPN. The four teams Pittsburgh (12,856), Denver (12,098/game), Washington (11,525) and Chicago (8,638) drew fairly well in their respective facilities; Washington and Chicago both managed to outdraw the 1984 averages of their respective USFL franchises, the Federals and Blitz. Denver played at the old McNichols Arena, Pittsburgh at the Civic Arena, Washington at the Capital Centre in Landover, Maryland, and Chicago at the Rosemont Horizon in Rosemont, Illinois (now the Allstate Arena and the only one of the initial AFL venues still extant As of 2018).

A fifth arena football team, the Miami Vise, played one exhibition game in 1987, later dubbed the "Showcase Game." The Vise defeated the Bruisers, 33–30, on February 26 but did not carry over to the regular season that summer. The AFL formally kicked off on Friday, June 19, 1987, when the host Pittsburgh Gladiators hosted the Washington Commandos at the Civic Arena in Pittsburgh before 12,177 fans.

AFL football officially began at 7:37 pm EDT that night when Washington's Dale Castro kicked the ball into the slack net (the mesh between the field goal posts) resulting in a touchback. The Gladiators took over on their own five-yard line. The very first play from scrimmage saw Pittsburgh quarterback Mike Hohensee hit WR/DB Russell Hairston on a 45-yard touchdown pass; the play would set the tone for the league's wide-open, high-scoring mandate that the game's inventor, James Foster, envisioned. The Gladiators, featuring future Arena Football League Hall of Famer Craig Walls playing against his brother Kendall, went on to win the game 48–46.

The head coaches of the four AFL teams in 1987 were former CFL great Ray Jauch (Chicago), future longtime AFL coach Tim Marcum (Denver), Joe Haering (Pittsburgh) and Bob Harrison (Washington).

Some of the notable performers for Chicago in 1987 included QB Mike Hold, Jr., FB/LB Billy Stone, WR Reggie Smith, DB Durwood Roquemore and future NFL head coach QB Sean Payton, before he was traded to Pittsburgh and later signed with Ottawa of the CFL.

The Denver Dynamite would also feature a backup QB that would go on to an NFL head coaching career: Marty Mornhinweg, who backed up Whit Taylor. Also on the Dynamite roster that year was FB/LB Rob DeVita, WR Durrell Taylor and future AFL Hall of Fame WR Gary Mullen.

Continuing the theme of quarterbacks who would go on to future coaching opportunities was Gladiators QB Mike Hohensee, who yielded the starting role with Pittsburgh early in the season to Brendan Folmar. Hohensee would return to the ArenaBowl nineteen years later in July 2006 by capturing ArenaBowl XX as head coach of the Chicago Rush.

Gladiators WR Russell Hairston had a 67 catches in 1987, good for 1,126 yards and 18 touchdowns (in just 6 games) and would go on to win AFL MVP honors. Also notable on the Pittsburgh roster was DB Mike Stoops who went on to coach the University of Arizona in 2005.

The Washington Commandos featured a high-scoring unit that had WR Dwayne Dixon (68 catches, 11 TDs) and QB Rich Ingold, who led the AFL with 29 TD passes and 1,726 yards.

ArenaBowl I that year featured the Gladiators hosting the Dynamite at Civic Arena; the Pittsburgh fans, however, went home disappointed as the Dynamite walked away with a 45–16 victory, a win that was the first of seven ArenaBowl titles for Denver coach Tim Marcum.

== Standings ==
1987 Arena Football League standings
Team	W	L	T	PCT	PF	PA	PF (Avg.)	PA (Avg.)	STK
y-Pittsburgh Gladiators	4	2	0	.667	268	199	44.6	33.1	L 2
x-Denver Dynamite	4	2	0	.667	261	252	43.5	42	W 2
Washington Commandos	2	4	0	.333	288	273	48	45.5	W 1
Chicago Bruisers	2	4	0	.333	217	310	36.1	51.6	L 1

y – clinched regular-season title

x – clinched playoff spot

== Playoffs ==
ArenaBowl I
1	Pittsburgh	16
2	Denver	45

== Awards and honors ==
=== Regular season awards ===
Award	Winner	Position	Team
Most Valuable Player	Russell Hairston	Wide Receiver/Defensive Back	Pittsburgh Gladiators
Ironman of the Year	Billy Stone	Fullback/Linebacker	Chicago Bruisers
Coach of the Year	Tim Marcum	Head coach	Denver Dynamite

=== All-Arena team ===
Position	First team	Second team
Quarterback	Rich Ingold, Washington	Whit Taylor, Denver
Fullback/Linebacker	Billy Stone, Chicago; Chris Brewer, Denver	Durell Taylor, Denver; Walter Holman, Washington
Wide receiver/Defensive back	Gary Mullen, Denver; Russell Hairston, Pittsburgh; Dwayne Dixon, Washington	Mike Stoops, Pittsburgh; Reggie Smith, Chicago; Lenny Taylor, Washington
Offensive lineman/Defensive lineman	Brent Johnson, Chicago; Craig Walls, Pittsburgh; Jon Roehlk, Washington	Kelly Kirchbaum, Denver; Patrick Cain, Denver; Michael Witteck, Washington
Kicker	Nick Mike-Mayer, Chicago	Dale Castro, Washington

== Team movement ==
# of Teams	Expansion Teams	Folded Teams	Suspended Teams	Returning Teams	Relocated Teams	Name Changes
4	Chicago Bruisers; Denver Dynamite; Pittsburgh Gladiators; Washington Commandos					
