= Chicago Bruisers =

Arena football team in Rosemont, Illinois, US

Logo

General information
- Founded: 1987
- Folded: 1989
- Headquartered: Rosemont Horizon in Rosemont, Illinois
- Colors: Black, light blue, white

Personnel
- Head coach: George Brancato

Team history
- Chicago Bruisers (1987–1989)

Home fields
- Rosemont Horizon (1987–1989)

League / conference affiliations
- Arena Football League (1987–1989)

Playoff appearances (2)
- 1988, 1989

The Chicago Bruisers were a professional arena football team based in Rosemont, Illinois. They were founded in 1987 as a charter member of the Arena Football League (AFL). They played their home games at Rosemont Horizon.

== History ==
=== Founding (1987) ===
The Bruisers were an outgrowth of the Chicago Politicians, a team put together by Jim Foster to play an exhibition game to prove the feasibility of the sport the previous year. The team logo depicted a bulldog. One of the founders of the Bruisers was former Chicago Bears linebacker and WSCR host Doug Buffone.

The Bruisers were part of the 1987 "Showcase Game", losing to the Miami Vise by a score of 33–30.

The Bruisers took a chance with a young team that averaged 25 years of age. The Bruisers' lost their first game in franchise history, 44–52 in overtime, to the Denver Dynamite. The Bruisers struggled in their second game, giving up 45 points in the first half before losing 23–60 to the Pittsburgh Gladiators. Despite getting off to a 2–3 start, the Bruisers had an opportunity to make it to ArenaBowl I with a win in the final week of the season against the Dynamite. The Bruisers however would lose 35–52. They finished with a record of 2–4 and failed to qualify for the playoffs.

The Bruisers' play-by-play announcer on radio and TV for all three of their seasons was Les Grobstein and their color commentator was Chicago Bears tight end Emery Moorehead.

=== Moss and ArenaBowl II (1988) ===
The Bruisers, like the Pittsburgh Gladiators but unlike the other two charter teams, the Denver Dynamite and the Washington Commandos, returned to play in the 1988 season. In February, the team hired Perry Moss as the franchise's second coach. Moss also served as general manager. The team competed in ArenaBowl II that year, losing 24–13 to the Detroit Drive.

=== End of the Bruisers (1989) ===
The Bruisers would be disbanded after competing in the 1989 season. The final two games they played were in exhibition games overseas against the Detroit Drive in Paris and then London in October 1989.

The rights to the Bruisers name and history were purchased by Arena Football 1 in December 2009, along with the rest of the Arena Football League. There was a possibility that the AF1's new expansion team in Chicago would adopt the Bruisers name, but said team instead decided to adopt the identity of the Chicago Rush instead. Since the Rush and the Bruisers never played at the same time, it was conceivable that the new Rush would adopt the history of both the old Rush and the Bruisers.

=== 2011 Honors ===
In 2011, the Chicago Rush celebrated its 10th season in the Arena Football League and honored the Chicago Bruisers.

In the Rush home opener on March 18, 2011 against the Philadelphia Soul, Chicago wore black uniforms similar to the Bruisers with a patch featuring the original Bruiser Bulldog. In the game, Chicago won the game 62–28. The Rush also adopted a real bulldog from a local Chicago pound that can be seen during games around the arena. Starting during the 2011 season, the Chicago Rush began wearing black uniforms more often over their traditional navy home jerseys the team has worn from 2001 to 2010 to honor the Bruisers.

== Notable players ==
=== Arena Football League Hall of Famers ===
Chicago Bruiser Hall of Famers
No.	Name	Year Inducted	Position(s)	Years w/ Bruisers
84	Carl Aikens, Jr.	2000	WR/DB	1988-89
5	Ben Bennett	2000	QB	1988-89
--	Perry Moss	2000	Head Coach	1988
21	Durwood Roquemore	1999	DS	1987-88
--	Reggie Smith	2002	OS	1987-89

=== Individual awards ===
AFL MVP
Season	Player	Position
1988	Ben Bennett	QB

AFL Ironman of the Year
Season	Player	Position
1987	Billy Stone	FB/LB
1989	Carl Aikens, Jr.	WR/DB

=== Chicago Bruisers All-Arena players ===
The following Bruisers players have been named to All-Arena Teams:

- QB Ben Bennett (1)
- FB/LB Billy Stone (1)
- WR/DB Reggie Smith (2), Carl Aikens, Jr. (2)
- OL/DL Brent Johnson (1), Jeff Faulkner (1), Osia Lewis (1)
- DS Durwood Roquemore (1)
- K Nick Mike-Mayer (1), Marco Morales (1)

=== Other notable players ===
- QB Jimbo Fisher (1988) – Threw just four passes for the Bruisers. He later served as the head coach of the Texas A&M Aggies from 2018 to 2023.

== Head coaches ==
Name	Term	Regular season				Playoffs		Awards
Name	Term	W	L	T	Win%	W	L	Awards
Ray Jauch	1987	2	4	0	.333	0	0	
Perry Moss	1988	10	1	1	.875	1	1	1988 AFL Coach of the Year
George Brancato	1989	1	3	0	.250	0	1	

== Season-by-season ==
Season records
Season	W	L	T	Finish	Playoff results
1987	2	4	0	3rd	--
1988	10	1	1	1st	Won Semifinals (Los Angeles 29-16); Lost ArenaBowl II (Detroit 23-14)
1989	1	3	0	4th	Lost Week 1 (Detroit 43-10)
Totals	13	8	1	(including playoffs)	

== Media ==
The Chicago Bruisers are also featured in the film Kinjite: Forbidden Subjects, directed by J. Lee Thompson and starring Charles Bronson. The game shown sees the Bruisers visit the Los Angeles Cobras. It was released in early 1989.

- The team appeared on the game EA Sports Arena Football as a hidden bonus team.
