= ArenaBowl =

Annual league championship game

The ArenaBowl
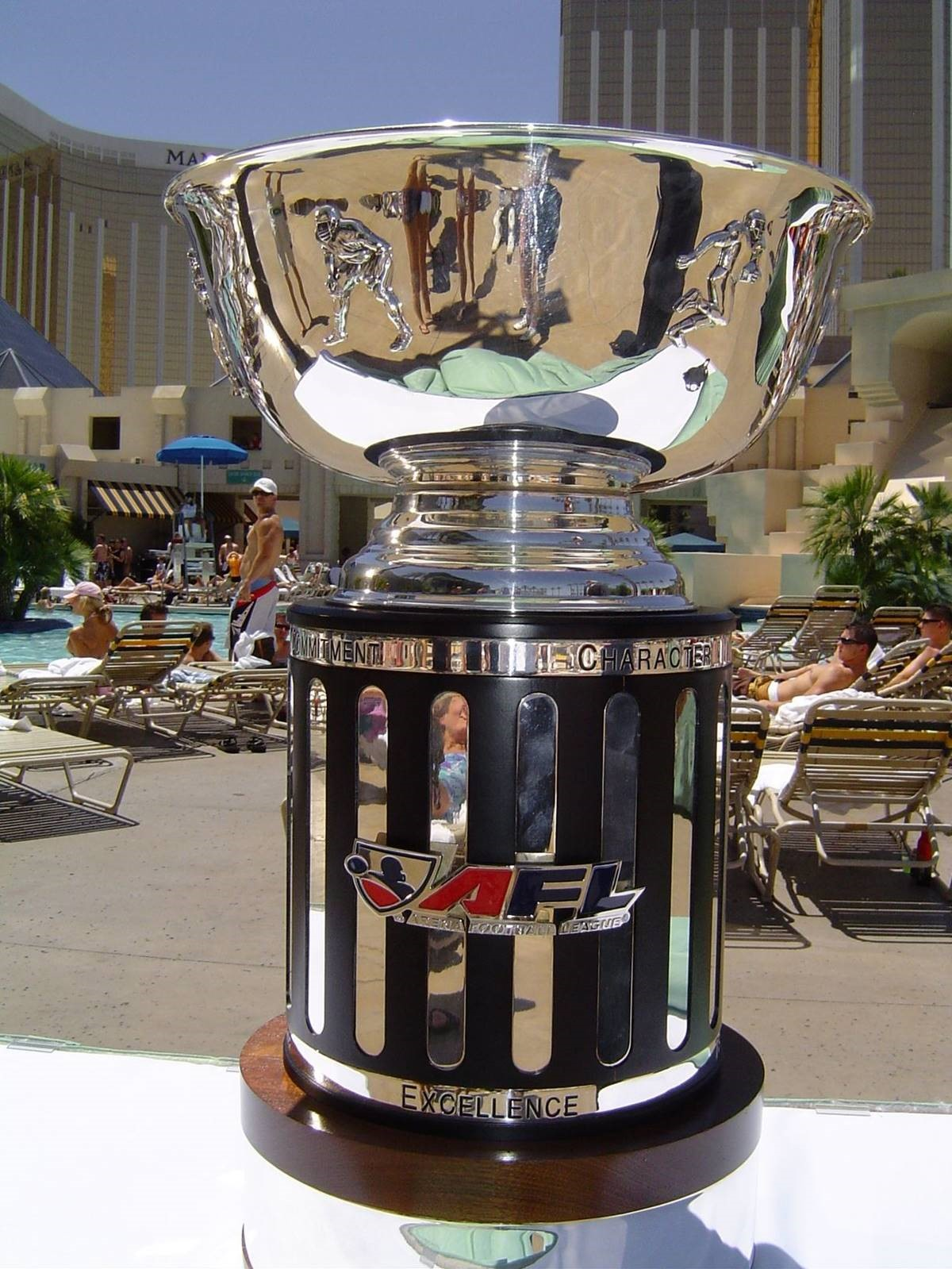
- The Foster Trophy is awarded to the ArenaBowl winner
- First played: August 1, 1987
- Last played: August 11, 2019
- Trophy: Foster Trophy

The ArenaBowl was the championship game of the Arena Football League (AFL). Originally hosted at Pittsburgh's Civic Arena based on home attendance during the inaugural 1987 season, save four years (2005–2008) the game was hosted by the team with the higher seed based on regular season performance. In 2005–2006 the league staged the game in Las Vegas, and in 2007–2008 New Orleans hosted the event. For the series final two games, regular season home attendance between the competing teams determined which would host.

Originally using year-based nomenclature ("ArenaBowl '87"), the league would begin consistently referring to the game using roman numerals beginning in 1994 ("ArenaBowl VIII"). The original Arena Football League's 2009 bankruptcy liquidation brought the league's existence to a close, but ArenaBowl XXIII would be staged in 2010 as the championship game of a new league which assumed the AFL's intellectual properties. The final ten games of the series would be staged under the "new" Arena Football League, concluding with ArenaBowl XXXII between the Albany Empire and Philadelphia Soul. The second AFL ultimately had the same fate as the first, ceasing operations after its 2019 season and undergoing Chapter 7 bankruptcy liquidation.

The intellectual property rights to the names of the Arena Football League and the ArenaBowl were sold through the league's bankruptcy proceeding in 2020. The ArenaBowl name was used in 2024 for ArenaBowl XXXIII.

== Results ==
Game	Date	Winning team		Losing team		MVP	Site	Attendance
ArenaBowl I	August 1, 1987	Denver Dynamite	45	Pittsburgh Gladiators	16	Gary Mullen	Pittsburgh Civic Arena	13,232
ArenaBowl II	July 30, 1988	Detroit Drive	24	Chicago Bruisers	13	Steve Griffin	Rosemont Horizon	15,018
ArenaBowl III	August 18, 1989	Detroit Drive	39	Pittsburgh Gladiators	26	George LaFrance	Joe Louis Arena	12,046
ArenaBowl IV	August 11, 1990	Detroit Drive	51	Dallas Texans	27	Art Schlichter	Joe Louis Arena	19,875
ArenaBowl V	August 17, 1991	Tampa Bay Storm	48	Detroit Drive	42	Stevie Thomas	Joe Louis Arena	20,357
ArenaBowl VI	August 22, 1992	Detroit Drive	56	Orlando Predators	38	George LaFrance (2)	Orlando Arena	13,680
ArenaBowl VII	August 21, 1993	Tampa Bay Storm	51	Detroit Drive	31	Jay Gruden	Joe Louis Arena	12,989
ArenaBowl VIII	September 2, 1994	Arizona Rattlers	36	Orlando Predators	31	Sherdrick Bonner	Orlando Arena	14,368
ArenaBowl IX	September 1, 1995	Tampa Bay Storm	48	Orlando Predators	35	George LaFrance (3)	ThunderDome	25,087
ArenaBowl X	August 26, 1996	Tampa Bay Storm	42	Iowa Barnstormers	38	Stevie Thomas (2)	Iowa Veterans Memorial Auditorium	11,411
ArenaBowl XI	August 25, 1997	Arizona Rattlers	55	Iowa Barnstormers	33	Donnie Davis	America West Arena	17,436
ArenaBowl XII	August 23, 1998	Orlando Predators	62	Tampa Bay Storm	31	Rick Hamilton	Ice Palace	17,222
ArenaBowl XIII	August 21,1999	Albany Firebirds	59	Orlando Predators	48	Eddie Brown	Pepsi Arena	13,652
ArenaBowl XIV	August 20, 2000	Orlando Predators	41	Nashville Kats	38	Connell Maynor	TD Waterhouse Centre	15,989
ArenaBowl XV	August 19, 2001	Grand Rapids Rampage	64	Nashville Kats	42	Terrill Shaw	Van Andel Arena	11,217
ArenaBowl XVI	August 18, 2002	San Jose SaberCats	52	Arizona Rattlers	14	John Dutton	HP Pavilion at San Jose	16,942
ArenaBowl XVII	June 22, 2003	Tampa Bay Storm	43	Arizona Rattlers	29	Lawrence Samuels	St. Pete Times Forum	20,469
ArenaBowl XVIII	June 27, 2004	San Jose SaberCats	69	Arizona Rattlers	62	Mark Grieb	America West Arena	17,391
ArenaBowl XIX	June 12, 2005	Colorado Crush	51	Georgia Force	48	Willis Marshall	Thomas & Mack Center*	10,822
ArenaBowl XX	June 11, 2006	Chicago Rush	69	Orlando Predators	61	Matt D'Orazio	Thomas & Mack Center*	13,476
ArenaBowl XXI	July 29, 2007	San Jose SaberCats	55	Columbus Destroyers	33	Mark Grieb (2)	New Orleans Arena*	17,056
ArenaBowl XXII	July 27, 2008	Philadelphia Soul	59	San Jose SaberCats	56	Matt D'Orazio (2)	New Orleans Arena*	17,244
ArenaBowl XXIII	August 20, 2010	Spokane Shock	69	Tampa Bay Storm	57	Kyle Rowley	Spokane Veterans Memorial Arena	11,017
ArenaBowl XXIV	August 12, 2011	Jacksonville Sharks	73	Arizona Rattlers	70	Aaron Garcia	US Airways Center	14,320
ArenaBowl XXV	August 10, 2012	Arizona Rattlers	72	Philadelphia Soul	54	Nick Davila	New Orleans Arena*	13,648
ArenaBowl XXVI	August 17, 2013	Arizona Rattlers	48	Philadelphia Soul	39	Rod Windsor	Amway Center*	12,039
ArenaBowl XXVII	August 23, 2014	Arizona Rattlers	72	Cleveland Gladiators	32	Nick Davila (2)	Quicken Loans Arena	18,410
ArenaBowl XXVIII	August 29, 2015	San Jose SaberCats	68	Jacksonville Sharks	47	Reggie Gray	Stockton Arena	9,115
ArenaBowl XXIX	August 26, 2016	Philadelphia Soul	56	Arizona Rattlers	42	Shaun Kauleinamoku	Gila River Arena	13,390
ArenaBowl XXX	August 26, 2017	Philadelphia Soul	44	Tampa Bay Storm	40	Darius Prince	Wells Fargo Center	13,648
ArenaBowl XXXI	July 28, 2018	Washington Valor	69	Baltimore Brigade	55	Arvell Nelson	Royal Farms Arena	8,183
ArenaBowl XXXII	August 11, 2019	Albany Empire	45	Philadelphia Soul	27	Tommy Grady	Times Union Center	12,042

* Neutral site

- The first seven ArenaBowls were known by the year in which they were played (i.e. ArenaBowl I was called ArenaBowl '87). ArenaBowl VIII was the first to carry a roman numeral, and all previous games were retconned to have roman numerals as well.
- The number in parentheses indicates the amount of ArenaBowl MVPs that player won.
- The Pittsburgh Gladiators relocated in 1991 to become the Tampa Bay Storm.
- The Nashville Kats relocated in 2002 to become the Georgia Force. The Kats were brought back as an expansion team in 2005 and assumed all former team history up to the point when the original Kats relocated to Georgia. The Force were regarded as a completely separate team and kept records from their establishment in 2002 to the team's demise in 2012, similar to the Cleveland Browns and Baltimore Ravens situation in the NFL.

=== Most championships won ===
Team	Championships	Winning years
Arizona Rattlers	5	1994, 1997, 2012, 2013, 2014
Tampa Bay Storm	5	1991, 1993, 1995, 1996, 2003
Detroit Drive	4	1988, 1989, 1990, 1992
San Jose SaberCats	4	2002, 2004, 2007, 2015
Philadelphia Soul	3	2008, 2016, 2017
Orlando Predators	2	1998, 2000
Albany Firebirds	1	1999
Chicago Rush	1	2006
Colorado Crush	1	2005
Denver Dynamite	1	1987
Grand Rapids Rampage	1	2001
Jacksonville Sharks	1	2011
Spokane Shock	1	2010
Washington Valor	1	2018
Albany Empire	1	2019

=== Standings ===
Team	W	L	PCT.	PF	PA	Last appearance
Arizona Rattlers	5	5	.500	500	482	2016
Tampa Bay Storm*	5	5	.500	402	434	2017
San Jose SaberCats	4	1	.800	300	215	2015
Detroit Drive	4	2	.667	243	203	1993
Philadelphia Soul	3	3	.500	279	303	2019
Orlando Predators	2	5	.286	316	337	2006
Albany Empire	1	0	1.000	45	27	2019
Albany Firebirds	1	0	1.000	59	48	1999
Chicago Rush	1	0	1.000	69	61	2006
Colorado Crush	1	0	1.000	51	48	2005
Denver Dynamite	1	0	1.000	45	16	1987
Grand Rapids Rampage	1	0	1.000	64	42	2001
Spokane Shock	1	0	1.000	69	57	2010
Washington Valor	1	0	1.000	69	55	2018
Jacksonville Sharks	1	1	.500	120	138	2015
Baltimore Brigade	0	1	.000	55	69	2018
Chicago Bruisers	0	1	.000	13	24	1988
Cleveland Gladiators	0	1	.000	32	72	2014
Columbus Destroyers	0	1	.000	33	55	2007
Dallas Texans	0	1	.000	27	51	1990
Georgia Force	0	1	.000	48	51	2005
Iowa Barnstormers	0	2	.000	71	97	1997
Nashville Kats	0	2	.000	80	105	2001

*Includes two appearances as Pittsburgh Gladiators (0–2, 42 points, 84 points allowed).

=== Coaching records ===
Coach	G	W	L	PCT.	Team(s)	Appearance(s)
Darren Arbet	5	4	1	.800	San Jose SaberCats	2002, 2004, 2007, 2008, 2015
Fran Curci	1	1	0	1.000	Tampa Bay Storm	1991
Mike Dailey	2	2	0	1.000	Albany Firebirds, Colorado Crush	1999, 2005
Clint Dolezel	4	2	2	.500	Philadelphia Soul	2013, 2016, 2017, 2019
John Gregory	2	0	2	.000	Iowa Barnstormers	1996, 1997
Jay Gruden	4	2	2	.500	Orlando Predators	1998, 1999, 2000, 2006
Kevin Guy	5	3	2	.600	Arizona Rattlers	2011, 2012, 2013, 2014, 2016
Joe Haering	1	0	1	.000	Pittsburgh Gladiators	1987*
Mike Hohensee	1	1	0	1.000	Chicago Rush	2006
Darrel Jackson	1	0	1	.000	Pittsburgh Gladiators	1989*
Ron James	1	0	1	.000	Tampa Bay Storm	2017
Doug Kay	1	0	1	.000	Columbus Destroyers	2007
Rob Keefe	2	2	0	1.000	Spokane Shock, Albany Empire	2010, 2019
Lary Kuharich	1	1	0	1.000	Tampa Bay Storm	1993
Tim Marcum	11	7	4	.636	Denver Dynamite, Detroit Drive, Tampa Bay Storm	1987, 1988, 1989, 1991, 1992, 1993, 1995, 1996, 1998, 2003, 2010
Benji McDowell	1	1	0	1.000	Washington Valor	2018
Les Moss	2	1	1	.500	Jacksonville Sharks	2011, 2015
Perry Moss	5	1	4	.200	Chicago Bruisers, Detroit Drive, Orlando Predators	1988, 1990, 1992, 1994, 1995
Bret Munsey	1	1	0	1.000	Philadelphia Soul	2008
Doug Plank	2	0	2	.000	Georgia Force, Philadelphia Soul	2005, 2012
Omarr Smith	1	0	1	.000	Baltimore Brigade	2018
Pat Sperduto	2	0	2	.000	Nashville Kats	2000, 2001
Ernie Stautner	1	0	1	.000	Dallas Texans	1990
Steve Thonn	1	0	1	.000	Cleveland Gladiators	2014
Michael Trigg	1	1	0	1.000	Grand Rapids Rampage	2001
Danny White	5	2	3	.400	Arizona Rattlers	1994, 1997, 2002, 2003, 2004

*Both Haering and Jackson coached the 1989 Pittsburgh Gladiators, but Jackson is credited with the postseason games.

== See also ==
- List of ArenaBowl broadcasters
- List of Arena Football League seasons
