= ArenaBowl I =

Denver Dynamite (2nd)	Pittsburgh Gladiators (1st)
45	16
	1	2	3	4	Total
DEN	12	6	14	13	45
PIT	0	0	0	16	16
- Date: August 1, 1987
- Stadium: Civic Arena; Pittsburgh, Pennsylvania
- MVP: Gary Mullen, WR/DB, Denver: Steve Trimble, WR/DB, Denver (Ironman of the Game)
- Attendance: 13,232
- Winning coach: Tim Marcum
- Losing coach: Joe Haering

TV in the United States
- Network: ESPN
- Announcers: Bob Rathbun, Lee Corso

Arena Bowl '87 (or Arena Bowl I) was the Arena Football League's first Championship Game. It was played on August 1, 1987, at the Civic Arena in Pittsburgh, Pennsylvania. In the game, the #2 Denver Dynamite defeated the #1 Pittsburgh Gladiators by a score of 45–16.

Coming into the game, with both teams finishing their seasons at 4–2, the Gladiators hosted the ArenaBowl due to their high attendance during the regular season. During the regular season the team split their games, with the Gladiators winning in Denver 49–32, but lost at home by a score of 32–31.

The first half of ArenaBowl I was not a competitive game, as the Dynamite came out leading at the half by a score of 18–0. The Dynamite scored the first 32 points and shut out the Gladiators for 3 quarters before Gladiators quarterback Mike Hohensee found Russell Hairston on an 11-yard pass. The Dynamite were paced on offense by wide receiver Gary Mullen, who had nine receptions for 123 yards and 3 touchdowns, earning him MVP honors.

== Game summary ==
The Dynamite got off to an early start with a fumble recovery for a touchdown by OL/DL Phil Forte, along with a two-yard touchdown run by FB/LB Richard Prather (with a failed two-point conversion) in the first quarter.

In the second quarter, Denver's domination continued with Quarterback Whit Taylor completing a 26-yard touchdown pass to WR/DB Gary Mullen (with another failed two-point conversion) for the only score of the period.

In the third quarter, the Dynamite continued their destruction with Taylor completing a 32-yard touchdown pass to WR/LB Richard Rodgers, along with WR/DB Steve Trimble returning an interception 47 yards for a touchdown.

In the fourth quarter, the Gladiators finally managed to score as Quarterback Mike Hohensee completed an 11-yard touchdown pass to WR/LB Russell Hairston (with a successful two-point conversion). Denver would wrap up the game with Taylor and Mullen hooking up with each other on a five-yard touchdown pass and even a 19-yard touchdown pass (failed PAT). Pittsburgh's final strike came from Quarterback Brendan Folmar to WR/DB Rodney Richmond.

Mullen was named the game's MVP for his performance.

== Scoring summary ==
1st Quarter

- DEN – Forte 0 Fumble Recovery (Morales kick failed)
- DEN – Prather 2 run (Taylor pass failed)

2nd Quarter

- DEN – Mullen 26 pass from Taylor (Taylor pass failed)

3rd Quarter

- DEN – Rodgers 32 pass from Taylor (Morales kick)
- DEN – Trimble 47 Interception Return (Morales kick)

4th Quarter

- PIT – Hairston 11 pass from Hohensee (Hohensee pass)
- DEN – Mullen 5 pass from Taylor (Morales kick)
- DEN – Mullen 19 pass from Taylor (Morales kick failed)
- PIT – Richmond 14 pass from Folmer (Folmer pass)
