= Denver Dynamite (arena football) =

American arena football team

Logo

General information
- Founded: 1987
- Folded: 1991
- Headquartered: McNichols Sports Arena in Denver, Colorado
- Colors: Blue, yellow, white

Personnel
- Owners: Sidney Shlenker; Gary Graham
- Head coach: Tim Marcum; Babe Parilli

Team history
- Denver Dynamite (1987, 1989–1991)

Home fields
- McNichols Sports Arena (1987, 1989–1991)

League / conference affiliations
- Arena Football League (1987, 1989–1991)

Championships
- League championships: 1: 1987

Playoff appearances (4)
- 1987, 1989, 1990, 1991

The Denver Dynamite were an arena football team based in Denver, Colorado. The team began play in 1987 as a charter member of the Arena Football League. The team was brought in by businessman Sidney Shlenker and the team achieved success instantly, winning the first ever ArenaBowl under future AFL Hall of Fame coach Tim Marcum. After sitting out the 1988 season, the Dynamite were purchased by investment banker Gary Graham for $125,000. Graham then hired former NFL and AFL coach Babe Parilli to lead the team. Under Parilli, the Dynamite would return to the playoffs every season, but failed to return to the ArenaBowl. After the 1991 season, the franchise was sued by their public relations firm and filed for bankruptcy. They played their home games at McNichols Sports Arena. The team's logo was a bundle of dynamite sticks with a burning fuse.

== History ==
=== 1987 ===
In 1987, businessman and then-owner of the Denver Nuggets Sidney Shlenker announced the forming of the Denver Dynamite. The franchise played in the inaugural four-team "demonstration" season of 1987. Despite the team and league's doubters, the Dynamite tied for the best record in the league with the Pittsburgh Gladiators, going 4–2. On August 1, 1987, the team participated in ArenaBowl I, which they won 45–16 over the Gladiators. The Dynamite were led on offense by quarterback Whit Taylor, and wide receiver Gary Mullen (Mullen won ArenaBowl I MVP). After winning the ArenaBowl, Head Coach Tim Marcum was named the league's first ever Coach of the Year. Despite averaging the league's best attendance with over 12,000 a game, it did not return for the league's second season due to Shlenker refusing to abide by the AFL's financial rules.

=== 1989 ===
The franchise was restarted in 1989, with the ownership purchased by Englewood, Colorado investment banker Gary Graham for $125,000. Graham's first move was to hire former NFL and AFL coach, Babe Parilli as the team's head coach. The team struggled to earn money during the 1989 season due to only hosting one home game. The team finished with a 3–1 regular season record, and lost in the first round of the playoffs, 37–39 to the Gladiators.

=== 1990 ===
With the same coaching staff in place from 1989, the Dynamite got off to a hot 4–1 start during the 1990 season. The Dynamite would finish the season with a record of 4-4, good enough to clinch the 3rd seed. The team lost 25–26 to the semi-finals to the Dallas Texans. The attendance had been steadily rising during the season, with the final home game's attendance listed at 10,587. This was later found to be skewed as around 3,000 people were admitted for free. The AFL stepped in and began to question the Dynamite operations and financial stability as some of the player's checks began to bounce during the season. Graham cited that the only problem came from a bookkeeping error.

=== 1991 ===
Despite the financial turmoil that occurred the season before, the Dynamite once again fielded a team in 1991. The team finished 6–4 during the regular season, again clinching the 3rd seed for the playoffs. The team lost to the relocated Gladiators, who became the Tampa Bay Storm, in the semi-finals. After the season, the franchise filed for bankruptcy after being sued by their public relations firm. When he learned of the situation in Denver, AFL commissioner Jim Foster has this to say, "Three things can happen. One, he finds a buyer, or we find him a buyer, and the team stays in Denver. Two, a buyer is found and moves to another city. Three, no one is interested and the franchise goes down." The Dynamite went up for sale, but with the city far more interested trying to attract investors to land a Major League Baseball franchise (Colorado Rockies), the team did not attract potential buyers.

=== Future of the Dynamite and arena football in Denver ===
The owners retained the rights to operate an arena football franchise, however, which they sold in 1996 to a Nashville, Tennessee-based group which started the first Nashville Kats franchise (later the Georgia Force) the next year.

Denver received a new arena football team in 2003, when the Colorado Crush, owned by Pat Bowlen and John Elway, was established. That franchise has since folded and the Crush name was acquired by the Indoor Football League team for its name change in 2015 from the Colorado Ice. In 2024, the Colorado Spartans of the National Arena League will be relocating to Denver from Loveland and play at the Denver Coliseum starting in 2025.

== Notable players ==
=== Arena Football Hall of Famers ===
Denver Dynamite Hall of Famers
No.	Name	Year Inducted	Position(s)	Years w/ Dynamite
??	Fred Gayles	2002	WR/DB	1989
1	Gary Mullen	1998	WR/DB	1987
73	Joe March	2000	OL/DL	1991
--	Tim Marcum	1998	Head Coach	1987

=== Individual awards ===
Kicker Player of the Year
Season	Player	Position
1991	Rusty Fricke	K

=== All-Arena players ===
The following Dynamite players were named to All-Arena Teams:

- QB Whit Taylor (1)
- FB/LB Chris Brewer (1), Durell Taylor (1)
- WR/DB Gary Mullen (1), Wayne Coffey (1)
- OL/DL Kelly Kirchbaum (1), Patrick Cain (1), Quinton Knight (2), Mitch Young (1), Joe March (1)
- DS Alvin Williams (1)
- K Gary Gussman (1), Rusty Fricke (1)

== Head coaches ==
Name	Term	Regular season				Playoffs		Awards
Name	Term	W	L	T	Win%	W	L	Awards
Tim Marcum	1987	4	2	0	.667	1	0	Coach of the Year
Babe Parilli	1989-1991	13	9	0	.591	0	3	Coach of the Year (1989)

== Media ==
- The team appeared on the game EA Sports Arena Football as a hidden bonus team.

== Season-by-season ==
ArenaBowl champions	ArenaBowl appearance	Playoff berth

Season	League	Regular season			Postseason results
Season	League	Finish	Wins	Losses	Postseason results
1987	AFL	2nd	4	2	Won ArenaBowl I (Pittsburgh) 45–16
1988	Inactive				
1989	AFL	2nd	3	1	Lost Semifinals (Pittsburgh) 39–37
1990	AFL	3rd	4	4	Lost Semifinals (Dallas) 26–25
1991	AFL	3rd	6	4	Lost Semifinals (Tampa Bay) 40–13
Total			17	11	(includes only regular season)
Total			1	3	(includes only the postseason)
Total			18	14	(includes both regular season and postseason)
