= 1988 New York Knights season =

Arena Football League team season

- Owner: Russell Berry
- Head coach: Jim Valek
- Home stadium: Madison Square Garden

Results
- Record: 2–10
- Division place: 6th
- Playoffs: Did not qualify

The 1988 New York Knights season was the first and only season for the Arena Football League franchise.

The Knights became an expansion team of the Arena Football League in 1988. The team announced Jim Valek as the first coach in franchise history. The team featured a couple of players from the 1987 New York Giants replacement team, including starting quarterback Jim Crocicchia and his primary receiver Edwin Lovelady, but its desire to fans was questioned before the team began playing games. The Knights won their first game in franchise history, 60–52 over the Los Angeles Cobras. During the Knights home opener, fight erumped in the stands, and items were thrown on the field. After winning the season opener, the Knights lost 4 straight games before returning home to a smaller crowd, losing 22–36 to the Cobras. The Knights would lose 8 straight games before they defeated the Cobras 40–30 in Los Angeles. The team folded after a disappointing 2–8 season.

== Regular season ==
=== Schedule ===
Week	Date	Opponent	Results		Game site
Week	Date	Opponent	Final score	Team record	Game site
1	April 30	at Los Angeles Cobras	W 60–52	1–0	Los Angeles Memorial Sports Arena
2	May 9	Detroit Drive	L 48–54	1–1	Madison Square Garden
3	May 14	at Chicago Bruisers	L 7–30	1–2	Rosemont Horizon
4	May 21	at New England Steamrollers	L 13–24	1–3	Providence Civic Center
5	May 27	at Pittsburgh Gladiators	L 36–46	1–4	Civic Arena
6	June 6	Los Angeles Cobras	L 22–36	1–5	Madison Square Garden
7	June 13	Chicago Bruisers	L 34–64	1–6	Madison Square Garden
8	June 18	New England Steamrollers	L 28–33	1–7	Madison Square Garden
9	June 23	Detroit Drive	L 9–49	1–8	Madison Square Garden
10	July 2	at Los Angeles Cobras	W 40–30	2–8	Los Angeles Memorial Sports Arena
11	July 11	Pittsburgh Gladiators	L 28–44	2–9	Madison Square Garden
12	July 15	at Detroit Drive	L 17–48	2–10	Joe Louis Arena

=== Standings ===
1988 Arena Football League standings
Team	W	L	T	PCT	PF	PA	PF (Avg.)	PA (Avg.)	STK
xy-Chicago Bruisers	10	1	1	.875	526	374	43.8	31.2	T 1
x-Detroit Drive	9	3	0	.750	472	310	39.3	25.8	W 7
x-Pittsburgh Gladiators	6	6	0	.500	507	491	42.3	40.9	L 1
x-Los Angeles Cobras	5	6	1	.458	463	449	38.6	37.4	T 1
New England Steamrollers	3	9	0	.250	335	511	27.9	42.6	W 1
New York Knights	2	10	0	.167	342	510	28.5	42.5	L 2

y – clinched regular-season title

x – clinched playoff spot

== Roster ==
1988 New York Knights roster
Quarterbacks: -- Mark Casale; 2 Jim Crocicchia; -- Stan Yagiello; Wide Receivers/Defensive Backs: -- Lewis Bennett; 25 Greg Best; -- Vince Courville; -- Elbert Gray; -- Stan Hunter; -- Edwin Lovelady; -- Jim Mauro; -- Pat Morrison; -- Rex Motes; -- Peter Raeford; -- Ken Sanders; -- Al Washington	Fullbacks/Linebackers: -- Derek Hughes; -- Al Neri; 32 Johnny Shepherd; Offensive Linemen/Defensive Linemen: -- Alec Gibson; -- Mark Grandy; 64 Walter Housman; -- Chris Jones; -- Quinton Knight; -- John Reed; -- A. J. Sebastianelli; -- Pete Walters	Wide Receivers/Linebackers: -- Mark Streeter; Kickers: -- Jack Kratochvil; -- Eric Schubert; Rookies in italics Roster updated February 27, 2013; 29 Active, 0 Inactive, 0 PS → More rosters

== Awards ==
Position	Player	Award	All-Arena team
Offensive/Defensive Lineman	Quinton Knight	none	1st
Wide Receiver/Defensive Back	Vince Courville	none	2nd
