= 1988 New England Steamrollers season =

Arena Football League team season

- Head coach: Babe Parilli
- Home stadium: Providence Civic Center

Results
- Record: 3–9
- Division place: 5th
- Playoffs: Did not qualify

The 1988 New England Steamrollers season was the first and only season for the Arena Football League franchise. Concert and fight promoter, Frank J. Russo, and jeweler, Robert Andreoli, purchased a limited partnership from the Arena Football League to own the rights to a Providence, Rhode Island team. The team's first move was the hiring of Head Coach Babe Parilli in March. After a 3–9 season, the Steamrollers didn't achieve the dollar amount that Russo and Andreoli thought they would, and the franchise folded.

== Regular season ==
=== Schedule ===
Week	Date	Opponent	Results		Game site
Week	Date	Opponent	Final score	Team record	Game site
1	April 29	Chicago Bruisers	L 35–60	0–1	Providence Civic Center
2	May 7	at Pittsburgh Gladiators	L 26–82	0–2	Civic Arena
3	May 13	Detroit Drive	L 24–29	0–3	Providence Civic Center
4	May 21	New York Knights	W 24–13	1–3	Providence Civic Center
5	May 26	at Los Angeles Cobras	L 20–27	1–4	Los Angeles Memorial Sports Arena
6	June 3	Chicago Bruisers	L 21–30	1–5	Providence Civic Center
7	June 11	Pittsburgh Gladiators	L 39–45	1–6	Providence Civic Center
8	June 18	at New York Knights	W 33–28	2–6	Madison Square Garden
9	June 25	Los Angeles Cobras	L 34–49	2–7	Providence Civic Center
10	July 1	at Chicago Bruisers	L 25–68	2–8	Rosemont Horizon
11	July 11	at Detroit Drive	L 10–46	2–9	Joe Louis Arena
12	July 16	at Pittsburgh Gladiators	W 44–34	3–9	Civic Arena

=== Standings ===
1988 Arena Football League standings
Team	W	L	T	PCT	PF	PA	PF (Avg.)	PA (Avg.)	STK
xy-Chicago Bruisers	10	1	1	.875	526	374	43.8	31.2	T 1
x-Detroit Drive	9	3	0	.750	472	310	39.3	25.8	W 7
x-Pittsburgh Gladiators	6	6	0	.500	507	491	42.3	40.9	L 1
x-Los Angeles Cobras	5	6	1	.458	463	449	38.6	37.4	T 1
New England Steamrollers	3	9	0	.250	335	511	27.9	42.6	W 1
New York Knights	2	10	0	.167	342	510	28.5	42.5	L 2

y – clinched regular-season title

x – clinched playoff spot

== Roster ==
1988 New England Steamrollers roster
Quarterbacks: 22 Matt Heidman; 8 Harold Smith; 7 Paul Williams; Wide receivers/Defensive backs: 30 Brian Allen; 23 Frank Bianchini; 9 Brian Gardner; 27 Russell Hairston; 46 David Hendley; 85 Jim Hockaday; -- Jason Oliver; 22 Jim Pratt; 28 Jim Rafferty; 27 Tony Slaton; 45 Alvin Williams	Running backs/Linebackers: 29 Chris Brewer; 44 Cletis Jones; Offensive linemen/Defensive linemen: 68 Sylvester Bembery; 98 Joe Felton; 63 Kim Johnson; 54 Kevin Murphy; 67 Mike Nease; 51 Steve O'Malley; 89 Jeff Oliver; 67 Donald Thompson; 88 Joe Williams; 56 ‘’Bill Birnbaum’’	Wide receivers/Linebackers: 29 Maurice Gravely; 31 Larry Friday; Kickers: 3 David Jacobs; 3 Bernie Ruoff; Rookies in italics Roster updated February 12, 2013; 29 Active, 0 Inactive, 0 PS

== Awards ==
Position	Player	Award	All-Arena team
Wide receiver/Defensive back	Jim Hockaday	none	2nd
Offensive/Defensive lineman	Kevin Murphy	none	2nd
Offensive/Defensive lineman	Sylvester Bembery	none	2nd
