= 1988 Los Angeles Cobras season =

Arena Football League team season

- Head coach: Ray Willsey
- Home stadium: Los Angeles Memorial Sports Arena

Results
- Record: 5–6–1
- Division place: 4th
- Playoffs: L semifinals vs. Chicago Bruisers 29–16

The 1988 Los Angeles Cobras season was the first and only season for the Cobras.

On March 16, 1988, it was announced that team would be nicknamed the Cobras, as well as the introduction of head coach Ray Willsey. The Cobras played their home games at the Los Angeles Sports Arena, which they shared with the Los Angeles Clippers of the National Basketball Association. The team's logo consisted of an interlocking "LA" in which the left upright of the "A" was formed by the hooded head and "neck" of a cobra.

The team debuted April 30, 1988, against the New York Knights. The Cobras started the season 0–3, but finished the season 5-3-1, clinching a playoff spot.

Despite a lineup that featured former NFL all-pro receiver Cliff Branch, ex-UCLA quarterback Matt Stevens and future Arena Football Hall of Fame Gary Mullen, Los Angeles drew dismal crowds: just 7,507 per game, second-worst in the AFL. The Cobras lost in the semifinals to the Chicago Bruisers, 29–16. It turned out to be their last game ever as the Cobras (as well as the New York Knights and the New England Steamrollers) folded after the 1988 season, temporarily cutting the league down to just three teams.

== Regular season ==
=== Schedule ===
Week	Date	Opponent	Results		Game site
Week	Date	Opponent	Final score	Team record	Game site
1	April 30	New York Knights	L 52–60	0–1	Los Angeles Memorial Sports Arena
2	May 6	at Chicago Bruisers	L 35–46	0–2	Rosemont Horizon
3	May 14	at Pittsburgh Gladiators	L 43–61	0–3	Civic Arena
4	May 21	Pittsburgh Gladiators	W 66–32	1–3	Los Angeles Memorial Sports Arena
5	May 26	New England Steamrollers	W 27–20	2–3	Los Angeles Memorial Sports Arena
6	June 6	at New York Knights	W 36–22	3–3	Madison Square Garden
7	June 10	at Detroit Drive	L 26–39	3–4	Joe Louis Arena
8	June 16	Detroit Drive	L 14–38	3–5	Los Angeles Memorial Sports Arena
9	June 25	at New England Steamrollers	W 49–34	4–5	Providence Civic Center
10	July 2	New York Knights	L 30–40	4–6	Los Angeles Memorial Sports Arena
11	July 9	at Chicago Bruisers	W 48–28	5–6	Rosemont Horizon
12	July 14	Chicago Bruisers	T 37–37 (OT)	5–6–1	Los Angeles Memorial Sports Arena

=== Standings ===
1988 Arena Football League standings
Team	W	L	T	PCT	PF	PA	PF (Avg.)	PA (Avg.)	STK
xy-Chicago Bruisers	10	1	1	.875	526	374	43.8	31.2	T 1
x-Detroit Drive	9	3	0	.750	472	310	39.3	25.8	W 7
x-Pittsburgh Gladiators	6	6	0	.500	507	491	42.3	40.9	L 1
x-Los Angeles Cobras	5	6	1	.458	463	449	38.6	37.4	T 1
New England Steamrollers	3	9	0	.250	335	511	27.9	42.6	W 1
New York Knights	2	10	0	.167	342	510	28.5	42.5	L 2

== Playoffs ==
Round	Date	Opponent	Results		Game site
Round	Date	Opponent	Final score	Team record	Game site
Semi-finals	July 23	at Chicago Bruisers	L 16–29	0–1	Rosemont Horizon

== Roster ==
1988 Los Angeles Cobras roster
Quarterbacks: 5 Eric Beavers; 18 Michael Mendoza; 10 Matt Stevens; Wide Receivers/Defensive Backs: 42 Mike Benson; 22 Cliff Branch; 26 Derrick Donald; 20 Joe Kelly; 1 Gary Mullen	Running Backs/Linebackers: 42 Rob DeVita; 65 Paul Green; 40 Yepi Pauu; 34 Richard Prather; 32 Ed Zeman; Offensive Linemen/Defensive Linemen: -- Eric Arrington; 55 Brian Clark; 60 Chuck Harris; 72 Dwayne Jackson; 84 Michael Jones; 80 Tony Palamara; 82 Louis Sorrentino; 64 Dester Stowers; 66 Wes Walton	Wide Receivers/Linebackers: 92 Wade Lockett; 93 Matthew McKnight; 25 Richard Rodgers; Kickers: 2 Nick Mike-Mayer; 2 Ken Olson; 2 Marty Zendejas; Rookies in italics Roster updated February 5, 2013; 28 Active, 0 Inactive, 0 PS → More rosters

== Awards ==
Position	Player	Award	All-Arena team
Wide Receiver/Defensive Back	Gary Mullen	none	1st
Quarterback	Matt Stevens	none	2nd
