= 1988 Detroit Drive season =

Arena Football League team season

- Head coach: Tim Marcum
- Home stadium: Joe Louis Arena

Results
- Record: 9–3
- Division place: 2nd
- Playoffs: Won Semi-Finals (Gladiators) 34-25; Won ArenaBowl II (Bruisers) 24–13

The 1988 Detroit Drive season was the first for the Drive.

The Drive began play in 1988 as a member of the Arena Football League. Under head coach Tim Marcum, the Drive finished the regular season 9–3 after starting the season 2–3. Two of the Drive's losses came at the hands of the Chicago Bruisers, who finished the season with one loss. The Drive would get a chance at revenge when they advanced to ArenaBowl II against the Bruisers, and they were able to defeat the Bruisers 24–13.

== Regular season ==
=== Schedule ===
Week	Date	Opponent	Results		Game site
Week	Date	Opponent	Final score	Team record	Game site
1	April 28	Pittsburgh Gladiators	L 51–57	0–1	Joe Louis Arena
2	May 9	at New York Knights	W 54–48	1–1	Madison Square Garden
3	May 13	at New England Steamrollers	W 29–24	2–1	Providence Civic Center
4	May 19	Chicago Bruisers	L 29–35	2–2	Joe Louis Arena
5	May 27	at Chicago Bruisers	L 31–36	2–3	Rosemont Horizon
6	June 2	Pittsburgh Gladiators	W 30–25	3–3	Joe Louis Arena
7	June 10	Los Angeles Cobras	W 39–26	4–3	Joe Louis Arena
8	June 16	at Los Angeles Cobras	W 38–14	5–3	Los Angeles Memorial Sports Arena
9	June 23	at New York Knights	W 49–9	6–3	Madison Square Garden
10	July 1	at Pittsburgh Gladiators	W 28–9	7–3	Civic Arena
11	July 9	New England Steamrollers	W 46–10	8–3	Joe Louis Arena
12	July 5	New York Knights	W 48–17	9–3	Joe Louis Arena

=== Standings ===
1988 Arena Football League standings
Team	W	L	T	PCT	PF	PA	PF (Avg.)	PA (Avg.)	STK
xy-Chicago Bruisers	10	1	1	.875	526	374	43.8	31.2	T 1
x-Detroit Drive	9	3	0	.750	472	310	39.3	25.8	W 7
x-Pittsburgh Gladiators	6	6	0	.500	507	491	42.3	40.9	L 1
x-Los Angeles Cobras	5	6	1	.458	463	449	38.6	37.4	T 1
New England Steamrollers	3	9	0	.250	335	511	27.9	42.6	W 1
New York Knights	2	10	0	.167	342	510	28.5	42.5	L 2

== Playoffs ==
Round	Date	Opponent	Results		Game site
Round	Date	Opponent	Final score	Team record	Game site
Semi-finals	July 22	Pittsburgh Gladiators	W 34–25	1–0	Joe Louis Arena
ArenaBowl II	July 30	at Chicago Bruisers	W 24–13	2–0	Rosemont Horizon

== Roster ==
1988 Detroit Drive roster
Quarterbacks: -- Mike Calhoun; -- Todd Hons; 9 Rich Ingold; Wide Receivers/Defensive Backs: -- David Evans; -- Larry Friday; 22 Steve Griffin; 27 George LaFrance; -- Nate Miller; -- Lenny Taylor; -- Steve Trimble	Running Backs/Linebackers: -- Tom Boyd; -- Jim Browne; 30 Walter Holman; -- Reggie Mathis; 44 Alvin Rettig; Offensive Linemen/Defensive Linemen: 88 John Corker; -- Craig Dumity; -- Greg Orton; 85 Kelly Quinn; 62 Jon Roehlk; -- Kim Stephens; -- Arland Thompson; 67 Jeff Wiska	Wide Receivers/Linebackers: 98 Dwayne Dixon; -- Tate Randle; Kickers: -- Novo Bojovic; Rookies in italics Roster updated February 12, 2013; 21 Active, 0 Inactive, 0 PS → More rosters

== Awards ==
Position	Player	Award	All-Arena team
Wide Receiver/Defensive Back	Dwayne Dixon	Ironman of the Year	1st
Fullback/Linebacker	Walter Holman	none	1st
Offensive Line/Defensive Line	Jon Roehlk	none	2nd
Defensive Secondary	Nate Miller	none	2nd
Kicker	Novo Bojovic	none	2nd
