= 1988 Chicago Bruisers season =

American football team season

- General manager: Perry Moss
- Head coach: Perry Moss
- Home stadium: Rosemont Horizon

Results
- Record: 10–1–1
- Division place: 1st
- Playoffs: Won Semi-finals (Cobras) 29-16; Lost ArenaBowl II (Drive) 24–13
- Team MVP: Ben Bennett

The 1988 Chicago Bruisers season was the second season for the Chicago Bruisers. The Bruisers finished 10–1–1 and lost ArenaBowl I to the Detroit Drive.

== Regular season ==
=== Schedule ===
Week	Date	Opponent	Results		Game site
Week	Date	Opponent	Final score	Team record	Game site
1	April 29	at New England Steamrollers	W 60–35	1–0	Providence Civic Center
2	May 6	Los Angeles Cobras	W 46–35	2–0	Rosemont Horizon
3	May 14	New York Knights	W 30–7	3–0	Rosemont Horizon
4	May 19	at Detroit Drive	W 35–29	4–0	Joe Louis Arena
5	May 27	Detroit Drive	W 36–31	5–0	Rosemont Horizon
6	June 3	at New England Steamrollers	W 30–21	6–0	Providence Civic Center
7	June 13	at New York Knights	W 64–34	7–0	Madison Square Garden
8	June 20	Pittsburgh Gladiators	W 46–25	8–0	Rosemont Horizon
9	June 24	at Pittsburgh Gladiators	W 54–47	9–0	Civic Arena
10	July 1	New England Steamrollers	W 68–25	10–0	Rosemont Horizon
11	July 9	Los Angeles Cobras	L 20–48	10–1	Rosemont Horizon
12	July 14	at Los Angeles Cobras	T 37–37 (OT)	10–1–1	Los Angeles Memorial Sports Arena

=== Standings ===
1988 Arena Football League standings
Team	W	L	T	PCT	PF	PA	PF (Avg.)	PA (Avg.)	STK
xy-Chicago Bruisers	10	1	1	.875	526	374	43.8	31.2	T 1
x-Detroit Drive	9	3	0	.750	472	310	39.3	25.8	W 7
x-Pittsburgh Gladiators	6	6	0	.500	507	491	42.3	40.9	L 1
x-Los Angeles Cobras	5	6	1	.458	463	449	38.6	37.4	T 1
New England Steamrollers	3	9	0	.250	335	511	27.9	42.6	W 1
New York Knights	2	10	0	.167	342	510	28.5	42.5	L 2

y – clinched regular-season title

x – clinched playoff spot

== Playoffs ==
Round	Date	Opponent	Results		Game site
Round	Date	Opponent	Final score	Team record	Game site
Semi-finals	July 23	Los Angeles Cobras	W 29–16	1–0	Rosemont Horizon
ArenaBowl II	July 30	Detroit Drive	L 13–24	1–1	Rosemont Horizon

== Roster ==
1988 Chicago Bruisers roster
Quarterbacks: 5 Ben Bennett; -- Jimbo Fisher; -- Willie Totten; Wide receivers/defensive backs: 84 Carl Aikens, Jr.; -- Rufus Bess; 26 Daryl Hart; -- Bruce McCray; -- Mike McDade; -- Ricky Mitchell; 21 Durwood Roquemore; -- Clyde Skipper; 1 Reggie Smith; -- Durell Taylor; 80 Steve Thonn	Fullbacks/linebackers: 82 Osia Lewis; -- Cliff Madison; -- Calvin Riggs; 32 Billy Stone; Offensive linemen/defensive linemen: -- Joe Bock; -- Mike Clark; -- Jeff Faulkner; 65 Brent Johnson; 66 Marc May; -- Mike McCurry; -- Billy Poe; -- Gene Rowell; -- Charles Tobias; 64 Keith Williams	Kickers: -- Marco Morales; Rookies in italics Roster updated February 25, 2013; 29 Active, 0 Inactive, 0 PS → More rosters

== Stats ==
=== Offense ===
==== Passing ====
Player	Comp.	Att.	Comp%	Yards	TD's	INT's	Rating
Ben Bennett	172	323	53.3	2304	49	13	97.3
Willie Totten	8	20	40.0	126	2	1	65.8
Jimbo Fisher	3	4	75.0	17	0	1	42.7
Marco Morales	0	1	0.0	0	0	0	39.6

==== Rushing ====
Player	Car.	Yards	TD's
Osia Lewis	64	206	5
Billy Stone	36	141	5
Calvin Riggs	22	73	3
Ben Bennett	21	54	2
Willie Totten	5	19	0
Cliff Madison	3	5	1
Jimbo Fisher	1	2	0

==== Receiving ====
Player	Rec.	Yards	TD's
Carl Aikens, Jr.	51	934	21
Reggie Smith	42	534	13
Daryl Hart	30	351	6
Steve Thonn	21	209	2
Clyde Skipper	18	249	5
Mike McDade	16	121	0
Jeff Faulkner	3	42	3
Osia Lewis	1	9	1
Ben Bennett	1	−2	0

==== Defense ====
Player	Tackles	Assisted	Sack	INT	Yards	TD's

=== Special teams ===
==== Kick returns ====
Player	Ret	Yards	TD's
Reggie Smith	34	733	2
Carl Aikens, Jr.	8	177	1
Clyde Skipper	7	89	0
Daryl Hart	4	73	0
Mike McDade	3	21	0
Durell Taylor	1	24	0
Ricky Mitchell	1	16	0
Steve Thonn	1	6	0
Osia Lewis	1	0	0

==== Kicking ====
Player	FGM	4pg	FGA	Pct.	XPM	2pt	XPA	Pct.	Pts.
Marco Morales	6	0	31	19.4	50	1	67	74.6	70

== Awards ==
Position	Player	Award	All-Arena team
Head coach	Perry Moss	Coach of the Year	--
Quarterback	Ben Bennett	Most Valuable Player	1st
Wide Receiver/Defensive Back	Carl Aikens, Jr.	none	1st
Offensive/Defensive Lineman	Jeff Faulkner	none	1st
Defensive Secondary	Durwood Roquemore	none	1st
Kicker	Marco Morales	none	1st
Fullback	Osia Lewis	none	2nd
Wide Receiver/Defensive Back	Reggie Smith	none	2nd
