= Mark Huyser-Wierenga =

Canadian lawyer (born 1961)

- Born: Mark Wierenga; 1961 (age 64–65); Edmonton, Alberta, Canada
- Education: Calvin College (BA); University of Alberta (LL.B.)
- Occupation: Crown Prosecutor
- Years active: 1989–present

Mark Huyser-Wierenga is a Canadian lawyer, currently a Crown Prosecutor for the Province of Alberta.

== Early life ==
Huyser-Wierenga was born in Edmonton, Alberta in 1961.

== Education ==
In 1983, Huyser-Wierenga received a Bachelor of Arts in history from Calvin College in Grand Rapids, Michigan. In 1987, he received a Bachelor of Laws from the University of Alberta in Canada. Huyser-Wierenga was called to the Bar of Alberta in 1989.

== Notable cases ==
In 2019 and 2020, Huyser-Wierenga prosecuted the trial of Matthew McKnight. The case drew considerable public attention in Canada due to the fact that McKnight was a well-known promoter at several nightlife establishments in the City of Edmonton including Oil City Roadhouse and the Old Strathcona Rack. The Globe and Mail and other news outlets referred to the trial as "the first major Canadian case of the #MeToo era". McKnight was found guilty on five of thirteen counts of sexual assault and sentenced to eight years in prison.

== Personal life ==
Huyser-Wierenga is blind due to choroideremia and has organized several fundraisers for finding a cure. In 2005, Ralph Witten wrote that Huyser-Wierenga had "raised over $130,000 CDN that will contribute to the beginnings of further research" on the disease.

In 2008, Huyser-Wierenga joined the board of Citizens for Public Justice.

In 2014, the Centre to End All Sexual Exploitation named Mark Huyser-Wierenga as a Men of Honour award recipient.

Mark Huyser-Wierenga is married to Debra Huyser-Wierenga who coauthored papers annually between 1989 and 1993 in the fields of neuro-oncology and radiation therapy.
