= Mike Busch (American football) =

American football player (born 1962)

No. 8
- Position: Quarterback

Personal information
- Born: February 8, 1962 (age 64); Huron, South Dakota, U.S.
- Listed height: 6 ft 4 in (1.93 m)
- Listed weight: 214 lb (97 kg)

Career information
- High school: Huron (SD)
- College: Idaho State; South Dakota State
- NFL draft: 1986: undrafted

Career history
- Atlanta Falcons (1986)*; New York Giants (1987); New York Knights (1988)
- * Offseason or practice squad member only

Career NFL statistics
- Passing attempts: 47
- Passing completions: 17
- Completion percentage: 36.2%
- TD–INT: 3–2
- Passing yards: 278
- Passer rating: 60.4
- Stats at Pro Football Reference

Mike Busch (born February 8, 1962) is an American former professional football player who played quarterback for the New York Giants.

Busch played NCAA Division I football for Idaho State where he was a member of the 1981 IAA National Championship football team before transferring to South Dakota State to finish his career. In 1984 he had a school-record 2,426 passing yards for the Jackrabbits, including a school-record 379 yards on September 15 against Morningside. The next season, he broke his own record with 2,554 passing yards, upset undefeated #1 USD, led the Jackrabbits to a 7–2 record for first place in the division, and was named MVP of the North Central Conference.

He was signed as an undrafted free agent by the Atlanta Falcons in 1986 and released. In 1987, he was signed by the New York Giants where he appeared in his only two professional games. In Week 3, he relieved Jim Crocicchia in the late third quarter, completing three of his six passes for two touchdowns and an interception in a lopsided loss to the San Francisco 49ers. He started the next week against Washington in his only other professional appearance, completing 14 of 41 passes for 183 yards, a touchdown, an interception, and six sacks. As of 2018 His 41 pass attempts and six sacks remain Giants rookie franchise records.
