= 1988 Pittsburgh Gladiators season =

Arena Football League team season

- Head coach: Joe Haering
- Home stadium: Civic Arena

Results
- Record: 6–6
- Division place: 3rd
- Playoffs: Lost semi-finals (Drive) 25–34

The 1988 Pittsburgh Gladiators season was the second season for the Arena Football League (AFL) franchise.

== Regular season ==
=== Schedule ===
Week	Date	Opponent	Results		Game site
Week	Date	Opponent	Final score	Team record	Game site
1	April 28	at Detroit Drive	W 57–51	1–0	Joe Louis Arena
2	May 7	New England Steamrollers	W 82–26	2–0	Civic Arena
3	May 14	Los Angeles Cobras	W 61–43	3–0	Civic Arena
4	May 21	Los Angeles Cobras	L 32–66	3–1	Los Angeles Memorial Sports Arena
5	May 27	New York Knights	W 46–36	4–1	Civic Arena
6	June 2	at Detroit Drive	L 25–30	4–2	Joe Louis Arena
7	June 11	at New England Steamrollers	W 45–39	5–2	Providence Civic Center
8	June 20	at Chicago Bruisers	L 25–46	5–3	Rosemont Horizon
9	June 24	Chicago Bruisers	L 47–54	5–4	Civic Arena
10	July 1	Detroit Drive	L 9–28	5–5	Civic Arena
11	July 11	at New York Knights	W 44–28	6–5	Madison Square Garden
12	July 16	New England Steamrollers	L 34–44	6–6	Civic Arena

=== Standings ===
1988 Arena Football League standings
Team	W	L	T	PCT	PF	PA	PF (Avg.)	PA (Avg.)	STK
xy-Chicago Bruisers	10	1	1	.875	526	374	43.8	31.2	T 1
x-Detroit Drive	9	3	0	.750	472	310	39.3	25.8	W 7
x-Pittsburgh Gladiators	6	6	0	.500	507	491	42.3	40.9	L 1
x-Los Angeles Cobras	5	6	1	.458	463	449	38.6	37.4	T 1
New England Steamrollers	3	9	0	.250	335	511	27.9	42.6	W 1
New York Knights	2	10	0	.167	342	510	28.5	42.5	L 2

y – clinched regular-season title

x – clinched playoff spot

== Playoffs ==
Round	Date	Opponent	Results		Game site
Round	Date	Opponent	Final score	Team record	Game site
Semi-finals	July 22	at Detroit Drive	L 25–34	0–1	Joe Louis Arena

== Roster ==
1988 Pittsburgh Gladiators roster
Quarterbacks: 7 Brendan Folmar; 9 Mike Hohensee; -- Stuart Mitchell; Wide Receivers/Defensive Backs: -- Carl Allen; -- Brad Calip; -- Russell Hairston; 28 Rob Minor; 31 Brian Moran; 29 Rodney Richmond; -- Cornelius Ross; -- Rick Shepas; -- Tony Slaton; 23 Keith Tinsley; 22 Lonnie Turner, Jr.	Running Backs/Linebackers: -- Fabray Collins; -- Creig Federico; 44 Mike Powell; Offensive Linemen/Defensive Linemen: 85 Earnest Adams; 98 Scott Dmitrenko; -- Cecil Fletcher; -- Pat Ogrin; 67 Dave Opfar; 54 Craig Walls; -- Kendall Walls	Wide Receivers/Linebackers: 27 Dan Burmeister; -- Kent Davis; 46 Julius Dawkins; Kickers: 3 Rusty Fricke; Rookies in italics Roster updated February 11, 2013; 28 Active, 0 Inactive, 0 PS → More rosters

== Awards ==
Position	Player	Award	All-Arena team
Offensive/Defensive Lineman	Craig Walls	none	1st
