= Michael Mendoza =

American gridiron football player

No. 18
- Position: Quarterback

Personal information
- Listed height: 6 ft 0 in (1.83 m)
- Listed weight: 200 lb (91 kg)

Career information
- High school: Bishop Montgomery (Torrance, California)
- College: Los Angeles Harbor (1981–1982); Northern Arizona (1983–1984)
- NFL draft: 1985: undrafted

Career history
- Los Angeles Raiders (1985)*; Ottawa Rough Riders (1986)*; Los Angeles Cobras (1988)
- * Offseason or practice squad member only

Career AFL statistics
- Comp. / Att.: 26 / 48
- Passing yards: 269
- TD–INT: 4–2
- QB rating: 74.05
- Stats at ArenaFan.com

Michael Mendoza is an American former football quarterback who played one season with the Los Angeles Cobras of the Arena Football League. He first enrolled at Los Angeles Harbor College before transferring to Northern Arizona University. He attended Bishop Montgomery High School in Torrance, California. Mendoza was also a member of the Los Angeles Raiders and Ottawa Rough Riders.

== Early life ==
Mendoza played high school football at Bishop Montgomery High School and was named the offensive player of the year in the Angelus League in 1981.

== College career ==
Mendoza played his first two seasons of college football for the Los Angeles Harbor Seahawks of Los Angeles Harbor College. He led the Seahawks to two Southern California Athletic Conference titles and a pair of post-season bowl berths. He then transferred to Northern Arizona University in 1983 to play for the Northern Arizona Lumberjacks and was named the Big Sky Conference's Newcomer of the Year. Mendoza completed 453 of 769 passes for 4,882 yards and 29 touchdowns during his two seasons as a starter at Northern Arizona. While attending NAU he was a member of Sigma Pi fraternity.

== Professional career ==
Mendoza spent time with the Los Angeles Raiders during training camp in 1985 after passing up an offer to play for the Denver Gold of the USFL. However, he was released before appearing in any preseason games.

Mendoza was a member of the Ottawa Rough Riders for a week before being released by the team on May 20, 1986.

Mendoza signed with the Los Angeles Cobras on June 9, 1988. He was placed on the team's taxi squad for his first game as a member of the Cobras on June 10 against the Detroit Drive. He was promoted to the active roster on June 23, 1988. Mendoza passed for 269 yards and four touchdowns in relief of starting quarterback Matt Stevens in a 37–37 tie against the Chicago Bruisers on July 14, 1988. Michael threw a 15-yard touchdown to Joe Kelly with 11 seconds left in regulation to tie the game. The Cobras' Nick Mike-Mayer then missed a 31-yard field goal with 46 seconds remaining in overtime. Mendoza appeared in the 1989 movie Kinjite: Forbidden Subjects as the movie contains a scene that is filmed during a live game between the Cobras and Bruisers. His name is audibly mentioned by the game's public address announcer. Michael worked as a loan representative prior to signing with the Cobras.
