= Ray Willsey =

American gridiron football player and coach (1928–2013)

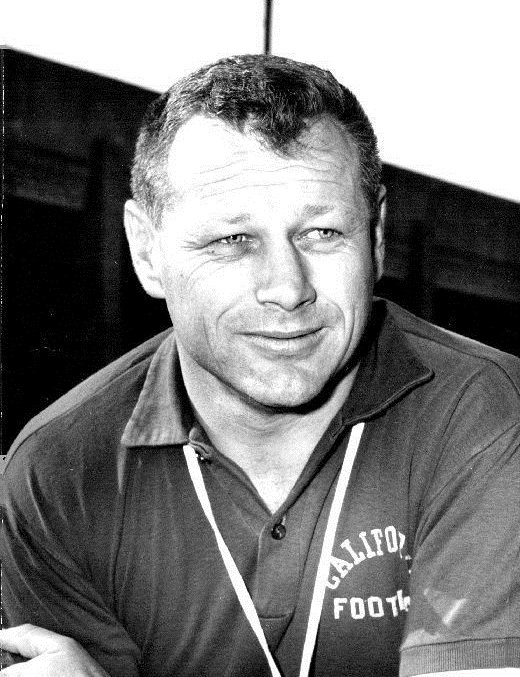
- Willsey in 1965

Biographical details
- Born: September 30, 1928; Regina, Saskatchewan, Canada
- Died: November 4, 2013 (aged 85); Hailey, Idaho, U.S.
- Education: California

Playing career
- 1953–1955: Edmonton Eskimos
- Position: Defensive back

Coaching career (HC unless noted)
- 1956: Washington Huskies (assistant)
- 1957–1959: Texas (assistant)
- 1960–1961: St. Louis Cardinals (DC/co-HC)
- 1963: Washington Redskins (DC)
- 1964–1971: California
- 1973–1977: St. Louis Cardinals (DC)
- 1978: Oakland Raiders (DB)
- 1979–1987: Oakland / Los Angeles Raiders (RB)
- 1988: Los Angeles Cobras
- 1989: Maryland Commandos
- 1991: London Monarchs (defensive)
- 1992: London Monarchs

Head coaching record
- Overall: 40–42–1 (.488)(college)

Ray Willsey (September 30, 1928 – November 4, 2013) was an American gridiron football player and coach. He was the head football coach at the University of California, Berkeley from 1964 to 1971. During his tenure he compiled a 40–42–1 record. He was inducted into the Orange County Sports Hall of Fame in 1993.

== Early life and playing career ==
Willsey was born in Regina, Saskatchewan, and played defensive back and quarterback at Tustin High School and Santa Ana College. He played for the California Golden Bears, helping the Bears win 26–0 against Stanford in 1952. He graduated from the University of California in 1953 with a degree in business. During 1953, Willsey toured Australia and New Zealand playing rugby league for the American All Stars. When the team landed in Australia, they did not know what the sport was. One week later, they played against the best players in the world in front of 65,453 people at the Sydney Cricket Ground. He then played for three years for the Edmonton Eskimos in Canada, but his playing career was ended by an elbow injury. He was a member of the Edmonton teams that won the 42nd Grey Cup and 43rd Grey Cup.

== Coaching career ==
Willsey's first assistant coaching job was at the age of 28 with the Washington Huskies under head coach Darrell Royal. He followed Royal to the University of Texas in 1957. His first NFL position was at defensive coordinator with the Saint Louis Cardinals in 1961, where he went 2–0 as co-head coach. Willsey coached the California Golden Bears from 1964 to 1971. His 1968 team finished 7–3–1, recording three shutout victories and holding eight of 12 opponents to 12 points or less, earning its defensive unit the nickname "The Bear Minimum." In 1971, Willsey resigned from Cal, and in 1973, he rejoined the Cardinals as defensive coordinator under head coach Don Coryell. He moved to the Oakland Raiders in 1977 as backfield coach. With the Raiders, Willsey was an assistant coach for Super Bowl-winning teams in 1980 (Super Bowl XV) and 1983 (Super Bowl XVIII), the latter of which Marcus Allen, whose position coach was Willsey, was named the MVP of Super Bowl XVIII. Allen mentioned Willsey as one of his favorite and most influential coaches during his Hall of Fame enshrinement speech.

In 1988, Willsey served as head coach of the Los Angeles Cobras during that team's only year of existence in the Arena Football League, in which his team compiled a 5–6–1 record. He was defensive coach of the London Monarchs when they won the World League title in 1991, and he became their head coach for the 1992 season. He was defensive coordinator for the Scottish Claymores in the mid-90s, and became director of personnel for NFL Europe in 1996. He was awarded the Glenn T. Seaborg Award in 2002, an annual honor given by Cal's football alumni association to a former Cal football player for his career accomplishments.

== Death ==
Willsey died on November 4, 2013, at the age of 85.

== Head coaching record ==
=== College ===
Year	Team	Overall	Conference	Standing	Bowl/playoffs
California Golden Bears (Pacific-8 Conference) (1964–1971)
1964	California	3–7	0–4	8th	
1965	California	5–5	2–3	T–5th	
1966	California	3–7	2–3	5th	
1967	California	5–5	2–3	6th	
1968	California	7–3–1	2–2–1	T–3rd	
1969	California	5–5	2–4	6th	
1970	California	6–5	4–3	T–2nd	
1971	California	6–5	4–3	T–3rd	
California:		40–42–1	18–25–1		
Total:		40–42–1			

=== Professional ===
League	Team	Year	Regular season					Postseason			
League	Team	Year	Won	Lost	Ties	Win %	Finish	Won	Lost	Win %	Result
NFL	STL	1961	2	0	0	1.000					
AFL	LA	1988	5	6	1	.458	4th Place	0	1	.000	Lost to Chicago Bruisers
WLAF	LON	1992	2	7	1	.250	3rd (Europe)				
Total			9	13	2	.417		0	1	.000	
Total			9	13	2	.417		0	1	.000	
