= List of Tarleton State Texans in the NFL draft =

This is a list of Tarleton State Texans football players in the NFL draft.

== Key ==
B	Back	K	Kicker	NT	Nose tackle
C	Center	LB	Linebacker	FB	Fullback
DB	Defensive back	P	Punter	HB	Halfback
DE	Defensive end	QB	Quarterback	WR	Wide receiver
DT	Defensive tackle	RB	Running back	G	Guard
E	End	T	Offensive tackle	TE	Tight end

= Pro Bowler
= Hall of Famer

== Selections ==
Year	Round	Pick	Player	Team	Position
1966	12	178	Randy Winkler	Detroit Lions	T
1967	23	364	Tommy Boyd	Dallas Cowboys	G
1999	6	191	James Dearth	Cleveland Browns	LS
2013	6	183	Rufus Johnson	New Orleans Saints	DE
2019	5	183	E. J. Speed	Indianapolis Colts	LB

== Notable undrafted players ==
Note: No drafts held before 1920

Debut year	Player name	Position	Debut NFL/AFL team	Notes
1987	Paul Williams	QB	Houston Oilers	
2006	Derrick Ross	FB	Kansas City Chiefs	
2007	Richard Bartel	QB	Dallas Cowboys	
2010	Garrett Lindholm	PK	Atlanta Falcons	
2012	Nick Stephens	QB	Tennessee Titans	
2014	Dashaun Phillips	CB	Dallas Cowboys	
2023	Benjie Franklin	DB	Jacksonville Jaguars	
2025	Darius Cooper	WR	Philadelphia Eagles	
