= Trial of Matthew McKnight =

R v. McKnight
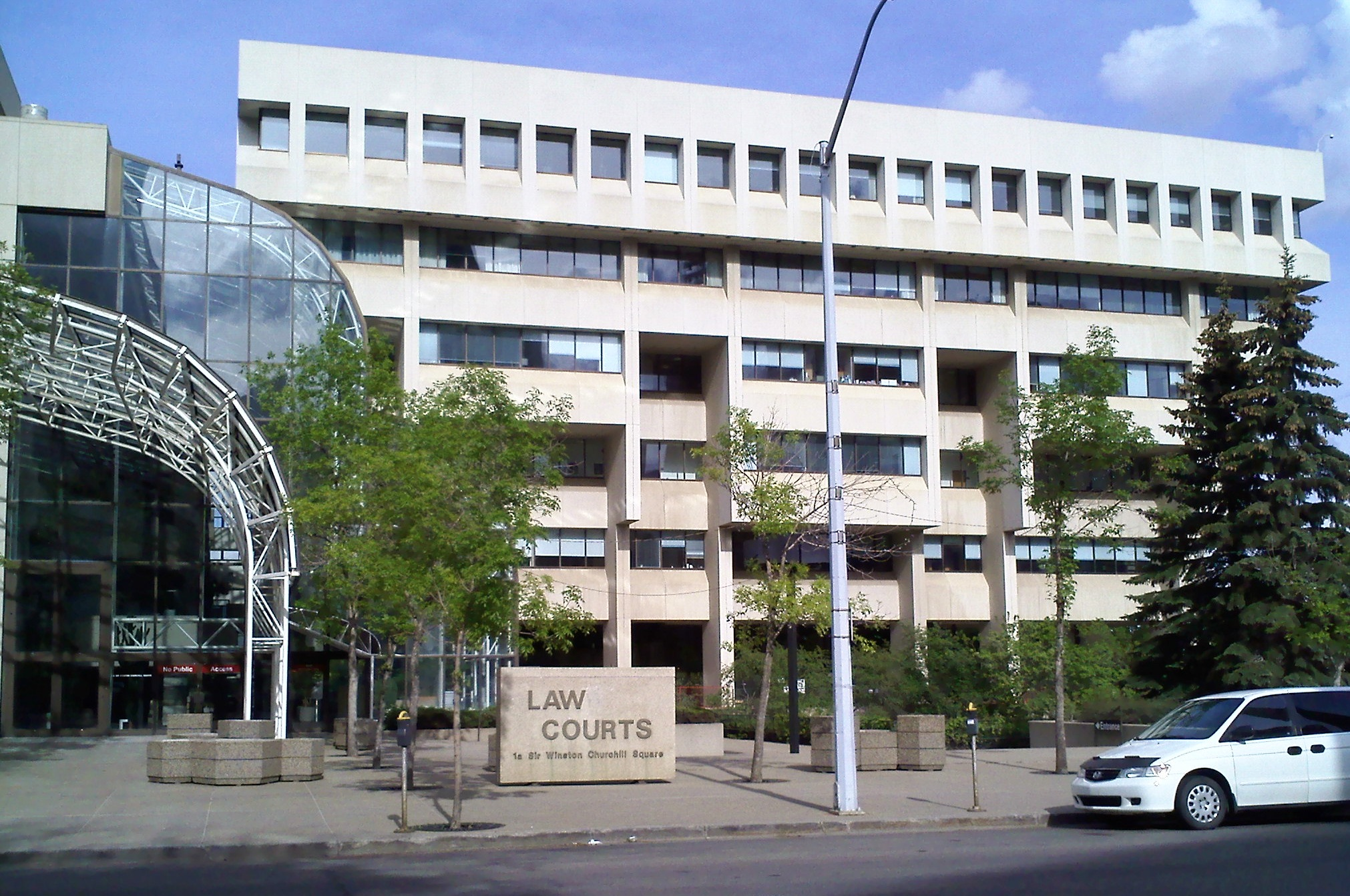
- Edmonton Law Courts, where the trial was held
- Court: Court of Queen's Bench of Alberta in Edmonton, Alberta
- Full case name: Her Majesty The Queen v. Matthew McKnight
- Decided: January 16, 2020
- Verdict: Guilty on five counts

Court membership
- Judge sitting: Doreen A. Sulyma, sitting with a Jury

Case opinions
- Decision by: Jury Verdict: Guilty on five counts

R v Matthew McKnight was a criminal prosecution of Matthew McKnight on thirteen charges of sexual assault, alleged to have been committed between 2010 and 2016.

On 10 August 2016, Matthew McKnight was charged with two counts of sexual assault, one count of sexual assault causing bodily harm, and one count of unlawful confinement. Following a public statement from the Edmonton Police Service, more complainants emerged. On 16 January 2020, McKnight was found guilty on five of thirteen counts of sexual assault. The case drew considerable public attention in Canada due to the fact that McKnight was a prominent entrepreneur and promoter at several nightlife establishments in the City of Edmonton including Oil City Roadhouse and the Old Strathcona Rack. The Globe and Mail referred to the trial as "the first major Canadian case of the #MeToo era."

== Crown prosecutors ==
R v. Matthew McKnight was prosecuted by Mark Huyser-Wierenga and Katherine Fraser. The Globe and Mail described Huyser-Wierenga as "one of the city’s most senior Crown prosecutors" and Fraser as "a young lawyer with an interest in sexual-assault prosecutions." Mark Huyser-Wierenga was called to the Bar of Alberta in 1989 and has worked the majority of his career in the Family Protection Unit within the Edmonton Crown Prosecutors’ Office, primarily prosecuting cases involving adult victims of domestic violence and child victims of sexual abuse. The Globe and Mail stated that "although Huyser-Wierenga was an experienced lawyer, the McKnight trial would be one of the largest and most complex of his career."

== Defence counsel ==
Lawyers Dino Bottos and Peter Sankoff defended the accused. The Globe and Mail referred to Bottos as "a prominent defence lawyer who’d been involved in a number of controversial and high-profile cases, including representing Bradley Barton in the death of Cindy Gladue in 2011."

== Judge ==
The Honourable Doreen A. Sulyma was selected as judge. Sulyma graduated from the University of Alberta Faculty of Law in 1975.

== Pre-trial ==
On 15 August 2016, McKnight was released from the Edmonton provincial law courts on $20,000 bail with conditions that he was to stay home from 21:00h each night until 7:00h the following morning. Additionally McKnight was prohibited from frequenting any businesses that serve alcohol and he was to regularly meet with an assigned police officer.

Initially there were 26 charges of sexual and physical assault from 21 different victims; however, some of the complainants decided they did not want to continue legal proceedings, and there were other charges on which the Crown decided not to proceed. Additionally, the Globe and Mail stated that "one woman couldn’t be located, and two cases would be heard separately." Thus McKnight was only tried on 13 of the original 26 charges.

== Jury selection ==
The trial of Matthew McKnight initially had a jury of 12 jurors; however, in the Globe and Mail, Jana G. Pruden wrote that "by the time closing arguments began in January, the McKnight trial had gone more than a month longer than planned, and the jury was down to 10. Losing another juror could put the case in serious jeopardy and even cause a mistrial."

== Prosecution's case ==
The prosecution questioned the accuracy of McKnight's memory; McKnight vividly described minute details of events that had taken place sometimes more than half a decade prior. Additionally, the Crown asked how McKnight could have "been struck by lightning 13 times," employing a metaphor for the 13 complainants. The Globe and Mail summarized that "the women didn’t know each other and had no connection to McKnight or any apparent reason to make up accusations about him. Many immediately told friends, family or boyfriends, and some searched for information about date-rape drugs, called the police or initiated sexual-assault examinations in the hours and days after leaving his apartment, even if they ultimately decided not to proceed."

== Defence's case ==
The Globe and Mail wrote that defence lawyer Dino Bottos "went over and over how many drinks [the complainants] had, what they said or didn’t say in earlier statements, questioning every detail they recalled and didn’t. He asked them about their lives, their bodies, even whether it was possible they showed signs of arousal that McKnight could have construed as consent. He zeroed in on gaps in their memories and inconsistencies in their stories, pulling at each detail and thread, picking at small holes until they gaped and glared."

== Expert witness testimony ==
Expert witnesses were called by the Crown including RCMP toxicologist Gillian Sayer and multiple sexual-assault nurse examiners. Sayer testified about the effects of the date rape drug GHB, specifically discussing memory loss, blackouts, and physical impairment.

== Closing arguments ==
In a longform piece in the Globe and Mail, Jana G. Pruden stated that the Crown's closing arguments "urged the jury to believe the women. Any inconsistencies or lapses in memory, they said, were entirely consistent with people who had experienced trauma and who were drinking and, in some cases, drugged. They argued the detailed and impeccable recollections of McKnight and his friends were not believable and were fabricated around the women’s testimony at the preliminary hearing." In contrast, the defence stated "went again through each allegation in minute detail. He argued a woman who had been telling people in the bar scene that McKnight drugged and raped women had become “patient zero” in a dangerous rumour, which exploded in the #MeToo environment, fuelled by gossip, social-media mobs and a shoddy police investigation. He said the announcement of the first three charges established McKnight as a threat and that the women who came forward after that were either lying or recasting their experiences, having 'buyer’s remorse' about an encounter with a man now publicly accused of being a predator."

== Jury instructions ==
Jana G. Pruden reported that the jury was instructed on "myths and stereotypes around sexual assault," and told that "factors such as how someone was dressed and what they did or didn’t do after the assault are no longer acceptable ways to discredit someone. It is to be accepted that there’s no one way a 'real victim' would act."

== Jury verdict ==
The jury found Matthew McKnight guilty of five charges and not guilty of the other eight charges.

== Sentencing ==
Matthew McKnight’s sentencing hearing began on 8 July 2020. The crown sought 22.5 years in jail. The defence presented their argument the week of 12 July 2020 arguing for five to nine years in jail. On 31 July 2020 McKnight was sentenced to eight years in jail.

== Public response ==
Edmonton Journal reporter Jonny Wakefield stated that "McKnight's case was Edmonton's highest-profile sexual assault trial of the Me Too era." Following the announcement of the guilty verdict, communication scientist Kristen Hedley responded via Twitter, asking "Am I missing something? Why hasn't anyone in the #yegmedia asked Urban Sparq Hospitality to make a comment re: Matthew McKnight's guilty verdict? Don't tell me that a culture of complicity wasn't a factor in the number of women impacted by this case."

In July 2020, the Globe and Mail's Jana G. Pruden called the trial of Matthew McKnight "the first major Canadian case of the #MeToo era" and John Doyle referred to Pruden's profile of the case as a "must read... superb."

== See also ==
- Me Too movement
