= Chris Jones (center) =

American football player (born 1964)

No. 90
- Position: Center

Personal information
- Born: June 26, 1964 (age 62); Norfolk, Virginia, U.S.
- Listed height: 6 ft 3 in (1.91 m)
- Listed weight: 263 lb (119 kg)

Career information
- High school: East Orange (East Orange, New Jersey)
- College: Delaware State (1982–1986)
- NFL draft: 1987: undrafted

Career history
- New York Giants (1987); New York Knights (1988)
- Stats at Pro Football Reference
- Stats at ArenaFan.com

Christopher Juan Jones (born June 26, 1964) is an American former professional football center who played one season with the New York Giants of the National Football League (NFL). He played college football at Delaware State University. He was also a member of the New York Knights of the Arena Football League (AFL).

== Early life and college ==
Christopher Juan Jones was born on June 26, 1964, in Norfolk, Virginia. He attended East Orange High School in East Orange, New Jersey.

He was a member of the Delaware State Hornets football team from 1982 to 1986.

== Professional career ==
Jones went undrafted in the 1987 NFL draft. On September 25, 1987, he signed with the New York Giants during the 1987 NFL players strike. He started three games for the team before the strike ended. Jones was released on October 19, 1987.

Jones played in five games for the New York Knights of the Arena Football League (AFL) in 1988. He was an offensive lineman/defensive lineman during his time with the Knights as the AFL played under ironman rules. He recorded five solo tackles, five assisted tackles, one sack, and one fumble recovery for the Knights.
