= Stan Yagiello =

American football player (born 1963)

No. 7
- Position: Quarterback

Personal information
- Born: May 4, 1963 (age 63); Livingston, New Jersey, U.S.
- Listed height: 6 ft 0 in (1.83 m)
- Listed weight: 195 lb (88 kg)

Career information
- High school: Livingston
- College: William & Mary
- NFL draft: 1986: undrafted

Career history
- Washington Redskins (1986)*; Toronto Argonauts (1987)*; Montreal Alouettes (1987)*; Pittsburgh Gladiators (1987); Dallas Cowboys (1987); New York Knights (1987-1988)
- * Offseason or practice squad member only

Awards and highlights
- UPI I-AA All-American (1985); All-ECAC (1985)

Career AFL statistics
- Games played: 6
- Completions-Attempts: 17-51
- Passing yards: 264
- TD–INT: 3-1
- Passer rating: 57.97
- Stats at ArenaFan.com

Stan Yagiello (born May 4, 1963) is an American former professional football player who was a quarterback in the National Football League (NFL) for the Dallas Cowboys. He also was a member of the Pittsburgh Gladiators and the New York Knights in the Arena Football League (AFL). He played college football for the William & Mary Tribe.

== Early life ==
Yagiello grew up in Livingston, New Jersey and attended Livingston High School. He was a member of the state champion baseball and football teams where he was first-team All-State in 1979 and 1980. He was selected by the Cleveland Indians in the 16th round of the 1981 MLB draft.

== College career ==
Yagiello chose to pass on professional baseball and accepted a football scholarship from The College of William & Mary. As a true freshman, he appeared in 3 games as a backup behind Chris Garrity, before being redshirted.

As a redshirt freshman in his first college start against Miami of Ohio Stan threw for 414 yards with 2 TD passes. After an injury in week 3 he platooned at quarterback until the sixth game of the season against Dartmouth College, when he took over the regular starting role.

As a sophomore, he had 18 out of 28 completions for 236 yards, 3 touchdown passes and one rushing touchdown, in a 28–12 win against the Virginia Military Institute.

As a junior, he had 261 completions (school record) out of 428 pass attempts (school record) for 2,801 passing yards (second in school history).

As a fifth year senior, he had 240 completions (second in school history) out of 413 pass attempts (second in school history) for 2,962 passing yards (school record), 23 touchdown passes (school record) and was ranked 11th nationally in passing efficiency. He made 24 completions for 405 yards (school record) and 2 touchdowns, in a 31–14 win against James Madison University. He had 345 passing yards (second in school history) against Norfolk State University.

He finished his college football career as the first four-year starter in school history. He also set career school records with 737 completions out of 1,246 pass attempts for 8,249 passing yards, 51 touchdown passes and twenty 200-yard passing games.

Yagiello also played college baseball, leading his team with a .437 batting average and a .470 on-base percentage as a junior in 1984.

In 1997, he was inducted into the William and Mary Athletics Hall of Fame.

== Professional career ==
=== Washington Redskins ===
Yagiello was signed as an undrafted free agent by the Washington Redskins after the 1986 NFL draft. On August 18 he was released to make room for quarterback Doug Williams, who was coming from the United States Football League.

=== Toronto Argonauts ===
On February 5, 1987, he signed with the Toronto Argonauts of the Canadian Football League. He was released on June 19.

=== Montreal Alouettes ===
In June 1987, after his release from the Argonauts, Yagiello signed with the Montreal Alouettes. He was released after Montreal withdrew from league due to bankruptcy.

=== Pittsburgh Gladiators (AFL) ===
On July 6, 1987, he was signed by the Pittsburgh Gladiators of the Arena Football League, to replace backup quarterback Kevin Russell.

=== Dallas Cowboys ===
After the NFLPA strike was declared on the third week of the 1987 season, those contests were canceled (reducing the 16-game season to 15) and the NFL decided that the games would be played with replacement players. On September 21, he was signed to be a part of the Dallas Cowboys replacement team. He was a backup quarterback behind Kevin Sweeney, Danny White and Loren Snyder. He was cut on October 7.

=== New York Knights ===
In 1987, he was signed by the New York Knights of the Arena Football League to be the backup quarterback. He was released on June 2, 1988.
