= Phyllis Schneider =

Communication scientist

- Born: 1952 (age 73–74)

Academic background
- Education: Northwestern University (PhD)

Academic work
- Institutions: University of Alberta

Phyllis Schneider is a developmental psycholinguist in the University of Alberta Department of Communication Sciences and Disorders at the University of Alberta Faculty of Rehabilitation Medicine.

== Background ==
Phyllis Schneider is a developmental psycholinguist in the University of Alberta Department of Communication Sciences and Disorders in the Faculty of Rehabilitation Medicine. Schneider received her PhD from Northwestern University in 1984. Schneider has published in the Journal of Linguistic Anthropology, Child Language Teaching and Therapy, and First Language.

== Bibliography ==
Per OCLC WorldCat.

- Text Production in Adolescence Formal Operations Skill vs. Explanation (1982)
- Children's ability to restore the referential cohesion of stories (1993)
- Interaction between Children with Developmental Delays and their Mothers during a Book‐sharing Activity (1995)
- Effectiveness of teaching story grammar knowledge to pre-school children with language impairment. An exploratory study (2000)
- Storytelling from pictures using the Edmonton Narrative Norms Instrument (2006)
- Who does what to whom: Introduction of referents in children's storytelling from pictures (2010)
