= Creig Federico =

American football player (born 1963)

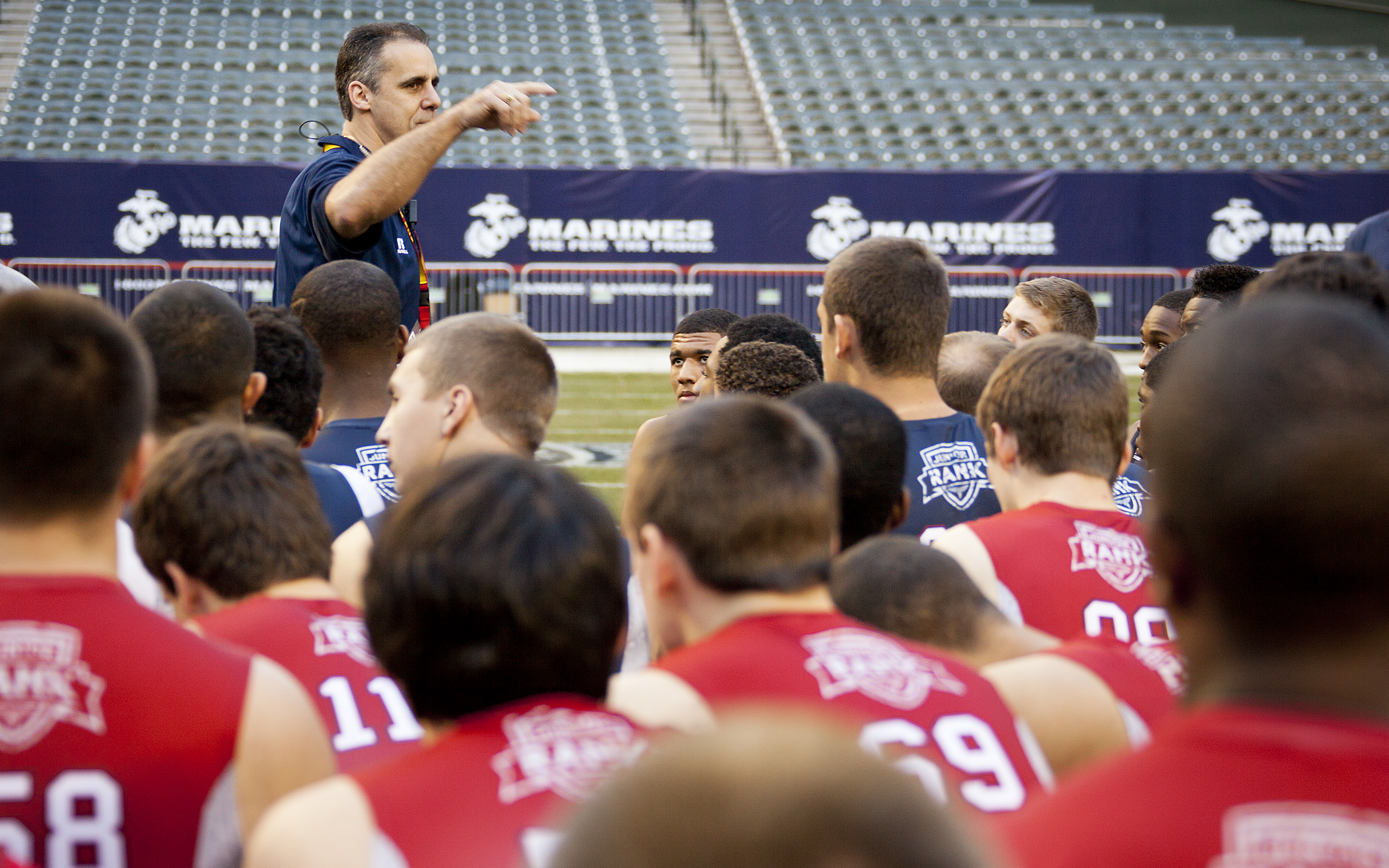
- Federico giving a motivational talk

No. 34
- Position: Strong safety

Personal information
- Born: May 7, 1963 (age 63); Chicago, Illinois, U.S.
- Listed height: 6 ft 2 in (1.88 m)
- Listed weight: 205 lb (93 kg)

Career information
- High school: James B. Conant
- College: Iowa Central CC; Illinois State
- NFL draft: 1986: undrafted

Career history
- Kansas City Chiefs (1986)*; Detroit Lions (1987); Pittsburgh Gladiators (1987–1988)
- * Offseason or practice squad member only

Career NFL statistics
- Sacks: 1
- Stats at Pro Football Reference

Creig Ronald Federico (born May 7, 1963) is an American former professional football player who was a defensive back for the Detroit Lions of the National Football League (NFL). He played college football for the Illinois State Redbirds. He also played for the Pittsburgh Gladiators.

He later became a coach.
