= Kristen Hedley =

Speech disorder researcher

- Born: Consort, Alberta

Academic background
- Education: University of Alberta

== Background ==
Kristen Hedley was raised in Consort, Alberta. In 2005, Hedley was awarded the 4-H Premier's Award. In 2012, Hedley obtained a Master of Science in Speech Language Pathology at the University of Alberta.

== Scholarship ==
Kristen Hedley's research is primarily concerned with phonological disorders and the implications such disorders may have in childhood education environments. Much of Hedley's scholarship employs the Alberta Education curriculum as a case study. In 2016, communication scientist Phyllis Schneider explained that

Hedley created a tool called the “SLP curriculum” for teachers and speech-language pathologists to use collaboratively, which identifies language demands within the curriculum. This tool used the learner specific outcomes from the Programs of Study for Mathematics, Social Studies, English Language Arts and Science for Grades K-3. The purpose was to identify key vocabulary, language skills and other skills that are embedded throughout the curriculum objectives for these Grades (including glossaries for “other language skills” and basic concepts). The present tool has been designed for Grades 4-6 and has been modified from the original work to include aspects and concepts that are more appropriate for older students. Modifications include changing definitions, adding skills and concepts and including a new glossary that codes skills that highlight increasing cognitive demands. The end result will be an expansion of the “SLP curriculum” that will hopefully be utilized within Alberta classrooms in order to enhance the education of students with language-learning difficulties.

— Phyllis Schneider, "Integrating Language Services and Curriculum"

In 2016, Hedley received the Horizon Award from the Alberta College Of Speech-Language Pathologists & Audiologists (ACSLPA).
