= Joe Williams (linebacker) =

American football player (born 1965)

No. 97
- Position: Linebacker

Personal information
- Born: March 5, 1965 (age 61); Baton Rouge, Louisiana, U.S.
- Listed height: 6 ft 4 in (1.93 m)
- Listed weight: 237 lb (108 kg)

Career information
- High school: McKinley (Baton Rouge)
- College: Grambling State
- NFL draft: 1987: undrafted

Career history
- Pittsburgh Steelers (1987); New England Steamrollers (1988); Denver Dynamite (1989)

Career NFL statistics
- Sacks: 1.0
- Stats at Pro Football Reference
- Stats at ArenaFan.com

Joseph Dennis Williams (born March 5, 1965) is an American former professional football player who was a linebacker for one season with the Pittsburgh Steelers of the National Football League (NFL). He played college football for the Grambling State Tigers. He was also a member of the New England Steamrollers and Denver Dynamite of the Arena Football League (AFL).

== Early life and college ==
Joseph Dennis Williams was born on March 5, 1965, in Baton Rouge, Louisiana. He attended McKinley Senior High School in Baton Rouge.

Williams was a member of the Tigers of Grambling State University from 1983 to 1986.

== Professional career ==
Williams signed with the Pittsburgh Steelers of the National Football League (NFL) on May 19, 1987, after going undrafted in the 1987 NFL draft. He was later released on August 31. On September 23, Williams signed with the Steelers again during the 1987 NFL players strike. He played in three games for the Steelers during the 1987 season and posted one sack. He was released after the strike ended.

Williams played in all 12 games for the New England Steamrollers of the Arena Football League (AFL) in 1988, recording 21 solo tackles, four assisted tackles, two sacks, three fumble recoveries, four carries for six yards and one touchdown, and one reception for one yard. He was an offensive lineman/defensive lineman during his time in the AFL as the league played under ironman rules. The Steamrollers finished the 1988 season with a 3–9 record.

Williams appeared in all four games for the Denver Dynamite of the AFL in 1989, posting one solo tackle and four sacks. The Dynamite went 3–1 and lost in the first round of the playoffs to the Pittsburgh Gladiators.
