= Harold Smith (gridiron football) =

American gridiron football player (born 1962)

No. 9
- Position: Quarterback

Personal information
- Born: January 5, 1962 (age 64); Houston, Texas, U.S.
- Listed height: 6 ft 3 in (1.91 m)
- Listed weight: 210 lb (95 kg)

Career information
- College: Texas Southern (1980–1984)
- NFL draft: 1985: undrafted

Career history

Playing
- Saskatchewan Roughriders (1985–1986); Cleveland Browns (1987); New England Steamrollers (1988); Edmonton Eskimos (1988); Denver Dynamite (1989); Albany Firebirds (1990)

Coaching
- Saskatchewan Roughriders (2000–2004); Receivers/quarterbacks (2000–2002); Quarterbacks (2003–2004)

Career AFL statistics
- Comp. / Att.: 200 / 404
- Passing yards: 2,288
- TD–INT: 34–19
- Passer rating: 68.38
- Rushing TDs: 10
- Stats at ArenaFan.com

Harold Jerone Smith (born January 5, 1962) is an American former professional football quarterback who played in the Canadian Football League (CFL) and Arena Football League (AFL). He played college football at Texas Southern University. He played for the Saskatchewan Roughriders and Edmonton Eskimos of the CFL, and the New England Steamrollers, Denver Dynamite and Albany Firebirds of the AFL. He was also a member of the Cleveland Browns during the 1987 NFL players strike.

== Early life and college ==
Harold Jerone Smith was born on January 5, 1962, in Houston, Texas. He was a member of the Texas Southern Tigers football team from 1980 to 1984. He was the MVP of the HBCU Freedom Bowl following his senior season.

== Professional career ==
Smith played in five games for the Saskatchewan Roughriders of the Canadian Football League (CFL) in 1985, completing 18 of 42 passes (42.9%) for 208 yards, one touchdown, and four interceptions. He appeared in eight games for the Roughriders in 1986, totaling nine completions on 24 passing attempts for 127 yards and two interceptions.

On October 14, 1987, Smith signed with the Cleveland Browns of the National Football League (NFL) during the 1987 NFL players strike. He did not appear in any games for the Browns and was released on October 19, 1987.

Smith played for the New England Steamrollers of the Arena Football League (AFL) in 1988, completing 187 of 351 passes (53.3%) for 2,071 yards, 31 touchdowns, and 18 interceptions while also rushing 25 times for 30 yards and six touchdowns. He also played in one game for the Edmonton Eskimos of the CFL in 1988 but did not record any statistics.

Smith played for the AFL's Denver Dynamite in 1989, recording 11 completions on 47 attempts (23.4%) for 196 yards, three touchdowns, and one interception while rushing 26 times for 83 yards and four touchdowns.

He completed two of six passes for 21 yards for the Albany Firebirds of the AFL in 1990.

== Coaching career ==
Smith returned to the Roughriders as a coach in 2000, serving as the receivers/quarterbacks coach from 2000 to 2002 and as quarterbacks coach from 2003 to 2004. He later returned to Texas Southern as co-quarterback coach and alumni liaison.
