= Mark Casale =

American gridiron football player (born 1962)

No. 17
- Position: Quarterback

Personal information
- Born: September 17, 1962 (age 64); Union, New Jersey, U.S.
- Listed height: 6 ft 3 in (1.91 m)
- Listed weight: 230 lb (104 kg)

Career information
- College: Montclair State (1980–1983)
- NFL draft: 1984: 9th round, 244th overall pick

Career history
- Chicago Bears (1984)*; Toronto Argonauts (1985); Miami Dolphins (1987)*; New York Knights (1988)
- * Offseason or practice squad member only

Career AFL statistics
- Comp. / Att.: 60 / 99
- Passing yards: 515
- TD–INT: 3–5
- Passer rating: 60.80
- Stats at ArenaFan.com

Mark Joseph Casale (born September 17, 1962) is an American former professional football quarterback who played one season with the Toronto Argonauts of the Canadian Football League (CFL). He was selected by the Chicago Bears in the ninth round of the 1984 NFL draft after playing college football at Montclair State College. Casale also played for the New York Knights of the Arena Football League (AFL).

== Early life ==
Mark Joseph Casale was born on September 17, 1962, in Union, New Jersey. He attended Union High School in Union.

== College career ==
Casale played college football for the Montclair State Indians of Montclair State College from 1980 to 1983. He was a backup during his freshman year in 1980, throwing for 35 yards total that season. He threw for over 2,000 yards his sophomore year in 1981 and led Montclair State to its first-ever NCAA postseason appearance. Casale passed for 2,300 yards, 17 touchdowns, and three interceptions his junior season in 1982, earning Kodak All-American honors. Casale completed over 50 percent of his passes during his college career for 6,096 passing yards. He was inducted into the school's athletics hall of fame in 1995.

== Professional career ==
Casale was selected by the Chicago Bears in the ninth round, with the 244th overall pick, of the 1984 NFL draft, and by the New Jersey Generals in the tenth round, with the 195th overall pick, of the 1984 USFL draft. He signed with the Bears on June 21. He was released on August 27, 1984.

Casale played in eight games for the Toronto Argonauts of the Canadian Football League in 1985, completing 65 of 110 passes (59.1%) for 637 yards, six touchdowns, and six interceptions while also scoring one rushing touchdown.

He signed with the Miami Dolphins of the NFL on February 5, 1987. He was released later that year.

Casale appeared in seven games for the New York Knights of the Arena Football League (AFL) in 1988, completing 60 of 99 passes (60.6%) for 515 yards, three touchdowns, and five interceptions.
