= Centre to Empower All Survivors of Exploitation and Trafficking =

Canadian non-profit organization

- Abbreviation: C.E.A.S.E.
- Formation: 1997 (P.A.A.F.E.); 2011 (Renamed)
- Type: Not-for-profit, charitable organization
- Location: Edmonton, Canada
- Website: www.ceasenow.org

The Centre to Empower All Survivors of Exploitation and Trafficking is a non-profit organization in Edmonton, Alberta, Canada.

== History ==
The Centre to Empower All Survivors of Exploitation (CEASE) and Trafficking was formerly named the Centre to End All Sexual Exploitation and before that the Prostitution Awareness and Action Foundation of Edmonton (PAAFE). In April 2011, CEASE replaced PAAFE. Kate Quinn has been the executive director of CEASE since 2011.

In the early 1990s, the City of Edmonton formed an organization named Communities for Controlled Prostitution, which was later renamed Communities for Changing Prostitution. Because of widespread prostitution in the Edmonton neighborhoods of Boyle Street and McCauley, the police chief of the City of Edmonton declared 1992 "The Year of The John." Mayor Jan Reimer and Police Chief Doug McNally subsequently launched the Action Group on Prostitution and the Mayor's Safer Cities Advisory Committee expanded to include Communities for Changing Prostitution. At this time, several Edmonton streets were converted to one-way travel in an attempt to restrict circling vehicles.

== Programs ==
In 1996, the City of Edmonton launched its Prostitution Offender Program (“John School”) which is now called STOP: Sex Trade Offender Program. CEASE continues to coordinate the Sex Trade Offender Program and manage the funds generated by the program.

== Activity ==
CEASE follows three strategies: heal the harm; build for the future; and champion social equality. The organization offers trauma recovery counselling sessions, peer support, education, ensuring survivors' income stability, and testification in court against offenders.

== Events ==
Each year, the Centre to Empower All Survivors of Exploitation and Trafficking hosts the Men of Honour ceremony, which recognizes men in society who show exemplary leadership to end gender discrimination and violence. For example: Mark Huyser-Wierenga and Amarjeet Sohi received the award in 2014 and 2015 respectively.

== See also ==
- Feminist views on prostitution
- Prostitution in Canada
