= Jim Crocicchia =

American football player (born 1964)

No. 2, 7, 9
- Position: Quarterback

Personal information
- Born: February 19, 1964 (age 62); Waterbury, Connecticut, U.S.
- Listed height: 6 ft 2 in (1.88 m)
- Listed weight: 209 lb (95 kg)

Career information
- High school: Holy Cross (Waterbury)
- College: Penn
- NFL draft: 1987: undrafted

Career history
- New York Giants (1987); New York Knights (1988)

Career NFL statistics
- Passing attempts: 15
- Passing completions: 6
- Completion percentage: 40.0%
- TD–INT: 1–0
- Passing yards: 89
- Passer rating: 82.4
- Stats at Pro Football Reference

Career AFL statistics
- Completions-Attempts: 111-238
- Passing yards: 1,601
- TD-INT: 26-9
- Passer rating: 80.53
- Stats at ArenaFan.com

James Francis Crocicchia (born February 19, 1964) is an American former professional football player who was a quarterback in the National Football League (NFL). He played college football for the Penn Quakers. Crocicchia was an NFL replacement player with the New York Giants in 1987. In 1988, Crocicchia played for the New York Knights of the Arena Football League (AFL).

== College career ==
Crocicchia played for the University of Pennsylvania, leading the Quakers to three straight Ivy League championships in 1984–86.

== Professional career ==
=== New York Giants ===
After going unselected in the 1987 NFL draft, Crocicchia was invited to training camp by the New York Giants. After being released, he was re-signed during the 1987 NFL strike and started for New York in Giants Stadium on Monday Night Football, October 5, 1987, against the San Francisco 49ers, making him the first ex-Penn quarterback to play in an NFL game since Pard Pearce in the 1920s. In his first and only NFL game, Crocicchia completed only six of fifteen passes for 89 yards and a touchdown and was replaced with Mike Busch after suffering an elbow injury in the fourth quarter. The Giants lost the game with a score of 41–21.

=== New York Knights ===
In 1988, Crocicchia played for the New York Knights of the Arena Football League. As the Knights starting quarterback, Crocicchia went 111-for-238 for 1,601 yards, with 26 touchdowns and nine interceptions. Crocicchia's favourite receiver, with 40 receptions, was Edwin Lovelady, who had played with him on the Giants. The Knights went just 2-10 under Crocicchia, however, and when the Knights folded at the end of the season, it spelled the end of the quarterback's professional career as well.

== Personal life ==
Crocicchia graduated from the Wharton School with a degree in economics. After his football career, he worked as a managing partner in an investment consulting firm.

His daughter Olivia Crocicchia is an actress famous for her role in the TV series Rescue Me.
