= Dave Jacobs =

American football player (born 1957)

No. 1, 10, 4
- Positions: Kicker, Punter

Personal information
- Born: July 15, 1957 (age 69); Scranton, Pennsylvania, U.S.
- Listed height: 5 ft 7 in (1.70 m)
- Listed weight: 150 lb (68 kg)

Career information
- High school: George Washington (Philadelphia, Pennsylvania)
- College: Syracuse
- NFL draft: 1979: 12th round, 325th overall pick

Career history
- Denver Broncos (1979)*; New England Patriots (1979)*; New York Jets (1979); Cleveland Browns (1981); Philadelphia Eagles (1982)*; New England Patriots (1982)*; New Jersey Generals (1983); Los Angeles Raiders (1984); Pittsburgh Maulers (1984)*; Syracuse Express (1985); Minnesota Vikings (1986)*; Detroit Lions (1987)*; Philadelphia Eagles (1987); New England Steamrollers (1988)
- * Offseason or practice squad member only

Awards and highlights
- First-team All-East (1977)

Career NFL statistics
- Field goal attempts: 26
- Field goals made: 12
- Extra points attempted: 25
- Extra points made: 21
- Stats at Pro Football Reference

David Joseph Jacobs (born July 15, 1957) is an American former professional football player who was a kicker and punter for 10 seasons. After playing college football for the Syracuse Orange, he spent time with the Denver Broncos, New York Jets, Cleveland Browns, and Philadelphia Eagles of the National Football League (NFL) before playing with the New Jersey Generals and Pittsburgh Maulers of the United States Football League (USFL). Afterwards he played a season with the Syracuse Express of the minor Empire Football League (EFL), before returning to the NFL with the Minnesota Vikings (1986) and making a second stint with the Philadelphia Eagles (1987). He finished his ten-year career by spending a year with the New England Steamrollers of the Arena Football League (AFL) in 1988.

== Early life ==
Jacobs was born on July 15, 1957, in Scranton, Pennsylvania. He went to high school at George Washington (PA).

== College career ==
Dave went to college at Syracuse University. In 1977 he was 16 for 29 on field goal attempts. He led all independent college teams for field goals made. He also was 22 for 22 on Extra Points. In 1978 he was 16 for 23 on field goal attempts. He was also 18 for 20 on Extra Points.

== Professional career ==
Denver Broncos

He was drafted in the 13th round (325) by the Denver Broncos but did not play for them.

New York Jets

Instead of playing for the Denver Broncos, he played for the New York Jets. He played in 4 games as a Jet, going 5 for 9 on Field goals and 10 for 11 on Extra Points. He played 4 games for the Jets.

Cleveland Browns

He was signed by the Cleveland Browns in 1981 after going unsigned in 1980. He played 5 games on the Browns. He was 4 for 12 on Field Goals and 9 for 10 on Extra Points.

Philadelphia Eagles

In 1982 he was signed by the Philadelphia Eagles but he did not make the roster.

New Jersey Generals

In 1983 he played for the New Jersey Generals of the USFL. He was 6 for 13 on Field Goals and 13 for 16 on Extra Points. He also was a punter for the Generals. He even had one rush attempt for -5 yards.

Pittsburgh Maulers

He was signed by the Pittsburgh Maulers in 1984 but did not play for them.

Syracuse Express

In 1985, he played for the Syracuse Express of the Empire Football League. He kicked a record 59-yard field goal with them.

Minnesota Vikings

He was signed by the Minnesota Vikings in 1986 but did not play with them.

Philadelphia Eagles (second stint)

In 1987, Jacobs played 3 games for the Philadelphia Eagles. He played Kicker and Punter. He was 3 for 5 on Field goals and 2 for 4 on Extra Points. He also had 10 punts for 369 yards and one blocked punt.

New England Steamrollers

Jacobs played his final season with the New England Steamrollers of the Arena Football League.
