= New England Steamrollers =

Arena football team

Logo

General information
- Founded: 1988
- Folded: 1988
- Headquartered: Providence Civic Center in Providence, Rhode Island
- Colors: Black, orange, white

Personnel
- Owners: Frank J. Russo; Robert Andreoli
- Head coach: Babe Parilli

Team history
- New England Steamrollers (1988)

Home fields
- Providence Civic Center (1988)

League / conference affiliations
- Arena Football League (1988)

The New England Steamrollers were an Arena Football League team based in Providence, Rhode Island. The team played in the AFL's 1988 season. The Steamrollers were one of four teams to enter the AFL in 1988, and along with the New York Knights and Los Angeles Cobras were folded following the season.

The Steamrollers were based out of Providence, Rhode Island and played their home games at the Providence Civic Center. They were the first professional football team of any kind to play in Providence since the Providence Steam Roller folded in 1931 and the first non-minor league professional sports franchise to play in the city since the NBA's Providence Steamrollers folded in 1949.

The coach of the Steamrollers was former Boston Patriots All-Pro quarterback Babe Parilli.

== History ==
In 1988, Concert and fight promoter, Frank J. Russo, and jeweler, Robert Andreoli, purchased a limited partnership from the Arena Football League to own the rights to a Providence, Rhode Island team. The team's first move was the hiring of Head Coach, Babe Parilli in March. After a 3-9 season, the Steamrollers didn't achieve the dollar amount that Russo and Andreoli thought they would, and the franchise folded.

== Notable players ==
=== Roster ===
1988 New England Steamrollers roster
Quarterbacks: 22 Matt Heidman; 8 Harold Smith; 7 Paul Williams; Wide receivers/Defensive backs: 30 Brian Allen; 23 Frank Bianchini; 9 Brian Gardner; 27 Russell Hairston; 46 David Hendley; 85 Jim Hockaday; -- Jason Oliver; 22 Jim Pratt; 28 Jim Rafferty; 27 Tony Slaton; 45 Alvin Williams	Running backs/linebackers: 29 Chris Brewer; 44 Cletis Jones; Offensive linemen/Defensive linemen: 68 Sylvester Bembery; 98 Joe Felton; 63 Kim Johnson; 54 Kevin Murphy; 67 Mike Nease; 51 Steve O'Malley; 89 Jeff Oliver; 67 Donald Thompson; 88 Joe Williams; 56 Bill Birnbaum	Wide receivers/linebackers: 29 Maurice Gravely; 31 Larry Friday; Kickers: 3 David Jacobs; 3 Bernie Ruoff; Rookies in italics Roster updated February 12, 2013; 29 Active, 0 Inactive, 0 PS

=== Arena Football League Hall of Famers ===
New England Steamrollers Hall of Famers
No.	Name	Year inducted	Position(s)	Years w/ Steamrollers
68	Sylvester Bembery	2011	OL/DL	1988

=== All-Arena players ===
The following Steamrollers players were named to All-Arena Teams:

- WR/DB Jim Hockaday
- OL/DL Sylvester Bembery, Kevin Murphy

== Head coaches ==
Name	Term	Regular season				Playoffs		Awards
Name	Term	W	L	T	Win%	W	L	Awards
Babe Parilli	1988	3	9	0	.250	0	0	

== Season-by-season ==
Season records
Season	W	L	T	Finish	Playoff results
1988	3	9	0	5th	--
