= Walt Housman =

American football player and coach (born 1962)

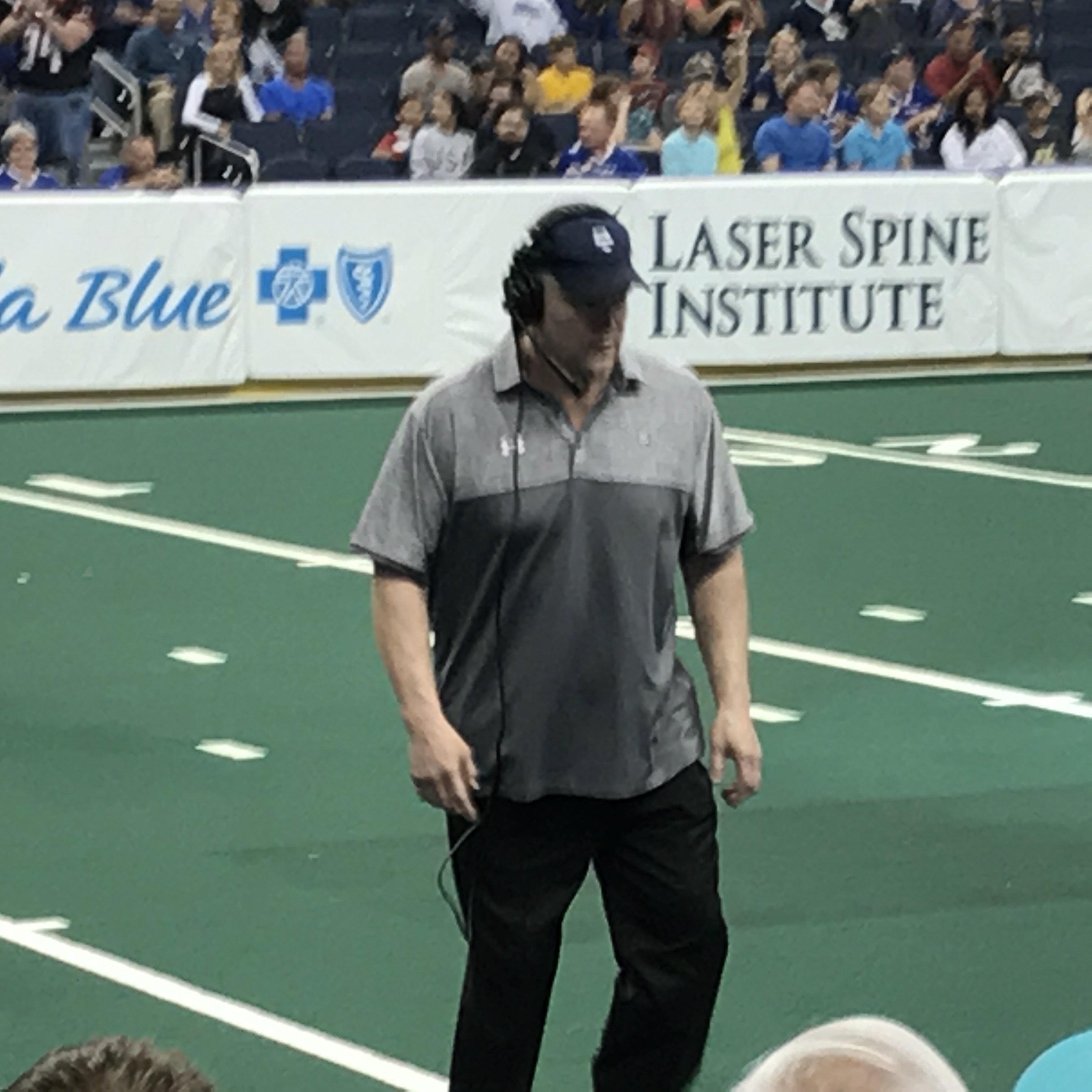
- Housman with the Baltimore Brigade in 2017

No. 68
- Position: Offensive tackle

Personal information
- Born: October 13, 1962 (age 64); Marshall, Missouri, U.S.
- Listed height: 6 ft 5 in (1.96 m)
- Listed weight: 285 lb (129 kg)

Career information
- High school: Merrimack (NH)
- College: Upsala
- NFL draft: 1987: undrafted

Career history

Playing
- New Orleans Saints (1987); New York Knights (1988); Denver Dynamite (1989–1990); New Orleans Night (1991)

Coaching
- Upsala College (1988) (Asst); Tulane (1991) (Vol. Asst); South Dakota (1992–1993) (DL); South Dakota (1994–1996) (DL / ST); South Dakota (1997–1998) (DC / ILB); Central Connecticut (1999) (DL); Saint Anselm (2000) (LB); Chicago Rush (2001–2008) (DC); Holy Cross (2009) (Vol. Asst / DE); Holy Cross (2010) (DL); Chicago Rush (2011–2013) (DC / Asst HC); Los Angeles Kiss (2014–2016) (DC / Asst HC); Baltimore Brigade (2017) (DC / Asst HC); Baltimore Brigade (2018–2019) (Asst HC)

Awards and highlights
- ArenaBowl champion (2006)

Career AFL statistics
- Tackles: 35.5
- Quarterback sacks: 7
- Forced fumbles: 1
- Pass breakups: 2
- Blocked kicks: 2
- Stats at ArenaFan.com
- Stats at Pro Football Reference

Walter Henry Housman III (born October 13, 1962) is an American former football player and coach. He played one season with the New Orleans Saints of the National Football League (NFL) as an offensive tackle. He played college football at the University of Iowa and Upsala College. Housman was also a member of the New York Knights, Denver Dynamite, and New Orleans Night of the Arena Football League (AFL). He was a college and AFL coach after his playing career.

== Early life and college ==
Housman attended Merrimack High School in Merrimack, New Hampshire.

Housman first played college football for the Iowa Hawkeyes for two years before injuring his knee. He transferred to play for the Upsala Vikings of Upsala College for three years, graduating in 1987 with a Bachelor's of Science in Business Administration. He also played basketball for one year.

== Professional career ==
Housman played in three games for the New Orleans Saints of the NFL in 1987. He played for the New York Knights of the AFL in 1988. He played for the AFL's Denver Dynamite from 1989 to 1990. Housman played for the New Orleans Night of the AFL in 1991.

== Coaching career ==
Housman was an assistant coach for the Upsala Vikings in 1988. He served as a volunteer assistant coach for the Tulane Green Wave in 1991. He was defensive line for the South Dakota Coyotes from 1992 to 1996. Housman was also special teams coach of the Coyotes from 1994 to 1996 and later served as defensive coordinator and inside linebackers coach from 1997 to 1998. He served as defensive line coach of the Central Connecticut Blue Devils in 1999. He was linebackers coach of the Saint Anselm Hawks of Saint Anselm College in 2000. Housman served as defensive coordinator of the AFL's Chicago Rush from 2001 to 2008. He also had previous coaching experience in the AFL with the New England Sea Wolves, Miami Hooters and New Orleans Night. He was a volunteer assistant and defensive ends coach for the Holy Cross Crusaders of the College of the Holy Cross in 2009. Housman later served as defensive line coach of the Crusaders in 2010. He served as defensive coordinator and assistant head coach of the Chicago Rush from 2011 to 2013. He was the defensive coordinator and assistant head coach of the Los Angeles Kiss of the AFL from 2014 to 2016. On March 7, 2017, Housman was named the defensive coordinator and assistant head coach for the Baltimore Brigade. In 2018, Cedric Walker became the Brigade's new defensive coordinator and Housman remained the assistant head coach.
