= Jeff Oliver =

American football player (born 1965)

No. 70
- Position: Offensive tackle / guard

Personal information
- Born: July 28, 1965 (age 61); Delhi, New York, U.S.
- Listed height: 6 ft 4 in (1.93 m)
- Listed weight: 265 lb (120 kg)

Career information
- College: Boston College

Career history
- New England Steamrollers (1988); Dallas Cowboys (1988)*; New York Jets (1989); Barcelona Dragons (1991–1992)
- * Offseason or practice squad member only

Awards and highlights
- 1987 Scanlan Award

Career NFL statistics
- Games: 1
- Starts: 0
- Touchdowns: 0
- Stats at Pro Football Reference

Career AFL statistics
- Receptions: 4
- Yards: 18
- Touchdowns: 1
- Stats at ArenaFan.com

Jeffrey Peter Oliver (born July 28, 1965) is an American former professional football player for one season with the New York Jets of the National Football League (NFL). He played college football for the Boston College Eagles.
