= Alec Gibson =

American football player (born 1963)

No. 96
- Position: Defensive end

Personal information
- Born: December 9, 1963 (age 62); Columbus, Ohio, U.S.
- Listed height: 6 ft 4 in (1.93 m)
- Listed weight: 240 lb (109 kg)

Career information
- High school: Burnsville (MN)
- College: Illinois
- NFL draft: 1986: undrafted

Career history
- Washington Redskins (1986–1987); New York Knights (1988)

Career NFL statistics
- Games played: 3
- Games started: 3
- Stats at Pro Football Reference

Career AFL statistics
- Tackles: 11
- Sacks: 2
- Passes defended: 1
- Forced fumbles: 1
- Stats at ArenaFan.com

Alec Raymond Gibson (born December 9, 1963) is an American former professional football player who was a defensive end for the Washington Redskins of the National Football League (NFL) in 1987. He played college football for the Illinois Fighting Illini.

== Career ==
In 1987, Gibson played in three games for the Washington Redskins as a replacement player. In 1988, Gibson played Arena football for the New York Knights. He played 11 of 12 games before injuring his right knee (ACL), which put an end to his career.

In 2018, Gibson was awarded a Super Bowl ring for playing for the Redskins in 1987, the year they won Super Bowl XXII.
