= Nate Miller (defensive back) =

American football player (born 1958)

No. 23
- Position: Defensive back

Personal information
- Born: March 21, 1958 (age 68); Leavenworth, Kansas, U.S.
- Listed height: 5 ft 10 in (1.78 m)
- Listed weight: 185 lb (84 kg)

Career information
- High school: Eisenhower (Rialto, California)
- College: San Bernardino (1976–1977); Cameron (1978–1979)
- NFL draft: 1980: undrafted

Career history
- Atlanta Falcons (1980)*; Denver Gold (1983–1985); BC Lions (1987)*; Detroit Drive (1988)
- * Offseason or practice squad member only

Awards and highlights
- ArenaBowl champion (1988); Second-team All-Arena (1988)
- Stats at ArenaFan.com

Nathaniel Antwyone Miller (born March 21, 1958) is an American former professional football defensive back who played three seasons with the Denver Gold of the United States Football League (USFL). He played college football at San Bernardino Valley College and Cameron University. He also played for the Detroit Drive of the Arena Football League (AFL).

== Early life and college ==
Nathaniel Antwyone Miller was born on March 21, 1958, in Leavenworth, Kansas. He attended Dwight D. Eisenhower High School in Rialto, California.

Miller first played college football at San Bernardino Valley College from 1976 to 1977. He then played for the Cameron Aggies of Cameron University from 1978 to 1979.

== Professional career ==
Miller signed with the Atlanta Falcons on May 10, 1980, after going undrafted in the 1980 NFL draft. He was released on July 24, 1980.

Miller signed with the Denver Gold of the United States Football League (USFL) on September 2, 1982. He played in 17 games, starting 11, for the Gold during the 1983 USFL season, recording two interceptions and one fumble recovery. He started all 18 games in 1984, recording one interception and one fumble recovery, as Denver went 9–9. In 1985, Miller totaled five interceptions for 76 yards and one fumble recovery during the USFL's final season. The Gold finished 11–7 and lost in the quarterfinals to the Memphis Showboats by a score of 48–7.

Miller was signed by the BC Lions of the Canadian Football League in 1987, but was later released.

He played in 11 games for the Detroit Drive of the Arena Football League (AFL) during the team's inaugural 1988 season, recording 43 solo tackles, ten assisted tackles, six interceptions for 39 yards, 11 pass breakups, two fumble recoveries, three receptions for 28 yards, and one kick return for 10 yards. On July 30, 1988, the Drive won ArenaBowl II against the Chicago Bruisers by a score of 24–13. Miller was named second-team All-Arena as a defensive specialist.
