= Keith Tinsley =

American football player (born 1965)

No. 84
- Position: Wide receiver

Personal information
- Born: March 31, 1965 (age 61); Detroit, Michigan, U.S.
- Listed height: 5 ft 9 in (1.75 m)
- Listed weight: 184 lb (83 kg)

Career information
- High school: Cooley (Detroit)
- College: Pittsburgh
- NFL draft: 1987: undrafted

Career history
- Los Angeles Rams (1987)*; Cleveland Browns (1987); Pittsburgh Gladiators (1988)
- * Offseason or practice squad member only

Career NFL statistics
- Receptions: 1
- Yards: 17
- Return yards: 31
- Stats at Pro Football Reference

Keith Anthony Tinsley (born March 31, 1965) is an American former professional football player who was a wide receiver for the Cleveland Browns of the National Football League (NFL) in 1987. He played college football for the Pittsburgh Panthers.
