= Dwayne Dixon =

American football player and coach (born 1962)

Profile
- Position: Wide receiver

Personal information
- Born: August 2, 1962 (age 64); Gainesville, Florida, U.S.
- Listed height: 6 ft 1 in (1.85 m)
- Listed weight: 205 lb (93 kg)

Career information
- High school: Santa Fe (Alachua, Florida)
- College: Florida
- NFL draft: 1984: undrafted

Career history

Playing
- Tampa Bay Buccaneers (1984); Washington Commandos (1987); Tampa Bay Buccaneers (1987); Detroit Drive (1988–1991)

Coaching
- Florida (1990–2004) AHC/WR/ST/PGC; NC State (2005–2006) Wide receivers coach; Ohio (2007–2023) Wide receivers coach

Awards and highlights
- 3× ArenaBowl champion (1988, 1989, 1990); AFL Ironman of the Year (1988); 2× First-team All-Arena (1987, 1988); AFL's 10th Anniversary Team (1996); Arena Football Hall of Fame; First-team All-SEC (1983); University of Florida Athletic Hall of Fame
- Stats at Pro Football Reference
- Stats at ArenaFan.com

Dwayne Keith Dixon (born August 2, 1962) is an American former professional football player who was a wide receiver in the National Football League (NFL) and Arena Football League (AFL). He played college football for the Florida Gators, and thereafter, played professionally for the Tampa Bay Buccaneers of the NFL, and the Washington Commandos and Detroit Drive of the AFL. Dixon was a college football coach from 1990 to 2023.

== Early life ==
Dixon was born in Gainesville, Florida in 1962. He attended Santa Fe High School in Alachua, Florida, where he was a standout prep football player for the Santa Fe Raiders high school football team.

== College career ==
Dixon accepted an athletic scholarship to attend the University of Florida in nearby Gainesville, where he was a wide receiver for coach Charley Pell's Gators from 1980 to 1983. Dixon led the Gators with 589 receiving yards as junior in 1982, and again with 596 yards as a senior in 1983. As a senior, he was also a first-team All-Southeastern Conference (SEC) selection, an Associated Press honorable mention All-American, and the recipient of the Gators' Fergie Ferguson Award, recognizing the senior who displayed "outstanding leadership, character and courage."

Dixon graduated from Florida with a bachelor's degree in criminal justice in 1985, and he was inducted into the University of Florida Athletic Hall of Fame as a "Gator Great" in 1997.

== Professional career ==
Dixon was signed by the Tampa Bay Buccaneers as an undrafted free agent in 1984, but he saw little action with the Buccaneers during the 1984 season. The Buccaneers re-signed him as a free agent in 1987, but again he received little playing time. Dixon also played for the Washington Commandos and Detroit Drive of the Arena Football League for five seasons from 1987 to 1991, and he accumulated 188 receptions and over 2,300 receiving yards with the Commandos and Drive.

== Coaching career ==
In 1990, Dixon returned to his alma mater to become the wide receivers coach for the Florida Gators under head coach Steve Spurrier, a position that he continued to hold under Spurrier's successor, Ron Zook. During his fifteen years as a Florida assistant, the Gators won six SEC championships (1991, 1993, 1994, 1995, 1996, 2000) and one national championship (1996). He was a 2001 finalist for the Broyles Award, given annually to the nation's top college football assistant coach. Dixon held the same position for the North Carolina State Wolfpack from 2005 to 2006, and until 2023, the wide receivers coach for the Ohio University Bobcats.

== Personal life ==
Dixon is married and has two children.

== See also ==
- Florida Gators
- Florida Gators football, 1980–89
- Florida Gators football, 1990–99
- History of the Tampa Bay Buccaneers
- List of University of Florida alumni
- List of University of Florida Athletic Hall of Fame members
- Ohio Bobcats
