= Johnny Shepherd =

American gridiron football player (born 1957)

Profile
- Position: Running back

Personal information
- Born: April 24, 1957 (age 69); La Grange, North Carolina, U.S.

Career information
- College: Liberty University; Livingston University

Career history
- 1983–86: Hamilton Tiger-Cats
- 1987: Buffalo Bills
- 1988: New York Knights

Awards and highlights
- Grey Cup champion (1986); Most Outstanding Rookie (1983)
- Stats at Pro Football Reference

Johnny Shepherd (born April 24, 1957) was an American star college football running back and the Rookie of the Year in the Canadian Football League (CFL).

== College career ==
Shepherd started his college career at Liberty University, where he was the team leading rusher in 1978 with 529 yards. He moved to Livingston University (now The University of West Alabama), where he was named Honorable Mention All-American in 1982, All-Gulf South Conference in 1981 and 1982 and is a member of UWA's Team of the Decade from the 1980s. He still sits atop the UWA career rushing chart with 2,057 yards on 387 carries and holds the career per-rush average (5.32). He also scored 26 rushing touchdowns in his career and scored 156 points. He owns the single-season record for rushing touchdowns with 13, rushing yards with 955, touchdowns scored with 15 and rushing attempts with 183. He also owns the single-game rushing record of 189 yards versus Tennessee-Martin in 1982. He was inducted into the UWA Hall of Fame in 1997.

== Professional career ==
Undrafted by the National Football League, Shepherd headed to the Canadian Football League in 1983, where he played with the Hamilton Tiger-Cats. Rushing for 1069 yards in his first season, he was an all-star and winner of the CFL's Most Outstanding Rookie Award. He played for two more seasons, but was hampered by injuries. Most notably, he scored a touchdown in 1985's 73rd Grey Cup, when Hamilton lost to the B.C. Lions.

In 1987, he played 2 games for the Buffalo Bills, as a strike replacement player, rushing 12 times for 42 yards and catching one pass. He finished his career in the Arena Football League, with the New York Knights in 1988, rushing 24 times for 85 yards, catching one pass, scoring 5 touchdowns, and making 29 tackles.

== Personal life ==
Shepherd now lives in Garner, North Carolina with his wife and two daughters Kanita and Jaraea
