= Child Language Teaching and Therapy =

- Discipline: computational linguistics/ Natural language processing
- Language: English
- Edited by: Judy Clegg

Publication details
- History: -1985-present
- Publisher: SAGE Publications (United Kingdom)
- Frequency: Triannual
- Impact factor: 0.553 (2010)

Standard abbreviations
- ISO 4: Child Lang. Teach. Ther.

Indexing
- ISSN: 0265-6590 (print); 1477-0865 (web)
- LCCN: 85642008
- OCLC no.: 42662298

Links
- Journal homepage; Online access; Online archive

Child Language Teaching and Therapy is a peer-reviewed academic journal that publishes papers in the fields of Linguistics and Education. The journal's editors are Judy Clegg (University of Sheffield) and Maggie Vance (University of Sheffield). It has been in publication since 1985 and is currently published by SAGE Publications.

== Scope ==
Child Language Teaching and Therapy focuses on children’s written and spoken language needs. The journal publishes research and review articles of relevance and which are of an inter-disciplinary nature. Child Language Teaching and Therapy publishes regular special issues on specific subject areas as well as keynote reviews of significant topics.

== Abstracting and indexing ==
Child Language Teaching and Therapy is abstracted and indexed in, among other databases: SCOPUS, and the Social Sciences Citation Index. According to the Journal Citation Reports, its 2010 impact factor is 0.553, ranking it 75 out of 141 journals in the category ‘Linguistics’. and 27 out of 36 journals in the category ‘Education, Special’.
