= Jim Hockaday =

American football player (born 1964)

Profile
- Positions: Wide receiver, linebacker

Personal information
- Born: March 7, 1964 (age 62); Nashville, Tennessee, U.S.
- Listed height: 6 ft 4 in (1.93 m)
- Listed weight: 215 lb (98 kg)

Career information
- High school: Brentwood (Brentwood, Tennessee)
- College: Georgia (1982–1985)
- NFL draft: 1986: undrafted

Career history
- New England Steamrollers (1988)

Awards and highlights
- Second-team All-Arena (1988)

Career AFL statistics
- Receptions: 69
- Receiving yards: 970
- Receiving TDS: 14
- Tackles: 27
- Interceptions: 1
- Stats at ArenaFan.com

James E. Hockaday (born March 7, 1964) is an American former professional football player who played one season with the New England Steamrollers of the Arena Football League. He played college football at the University of Georgia.

== Early life and college ==
James E. Hockaday was born on March 7, 1964, in Nashville, Tennessee. He played high school football at Brentwood Academy in Brentwood, Tennessee. He helped them win the Class AA state title in both 1980 and 1981. Hockaday caught 39 touchdowns during his high school career, which was the fourth-most all-time in the country. The Knoxville News Sentinel named Hockday the No. 1 prospect in Tennessee his senior year. In 2024, The Tennessean named Hockaday to their all-time Brentwood Academy football team.

Head coach Johnny Majors of the Tennessee Volunteers tried to recruit Hockaday to play college football at the University of Tennessee. However, a week after National Signing Day, Hockaday chose to enroll at the University of Georgia. He was a four-year letterman for the Georgia Bulldogs from 1982 to 1985. He caught one pass for ten yards in 1982, three passes for 83 yards and one touchdown in 1983, 14 passes for 143 yards and one touchdown in 1984, and eight passes for 161 yards and one touchdown in 1985.

== Professional career ==
Hockaday played in all 12 games for the New England Steamrollers of the Arena Football League in 1988, totaling 69 receptions for 970 yards and 14 touchdowns, 23 solo tackles, eight assisted tackles, one sack, one forced fumble, one interception, and two pass breakups. Hockaday was a wide receiver/linebacker during his time in the AFL as the league played under ironman rules. The Steamrollers finished the year with a 3–9 record. Hockaday was named second-team All-Arena for his performance during the 1988 season.
