= Frank Bianchini =

American football player (born 1961)

No. 30
- Positions: Running back, wide receiver, cornerback

Personal information
- Born: May 27, 1961 (age 65); East Islip, New York, U.S.
- Listed height: 5 ft 8 in (1.73 m)
- Listed weight: 190 lb (86 kg)

Career information
- High school: East Islip
- College: Hofstra
- NFL draft: 1983: undrafted

Career history
- New England Patriots (1987); New England Steamrollers (1988); Denver Dynamite (1989-1991); Charlotte Rage (1992)

Career NFL statistics
- Games played: 1
- Stats at Pro Football Reference

Career AFL statistics
- Games played: 23
- Rushes-yards: 26-50
- Receptions-yards: 17-170
- Stats at ArenaFan.com

Frank Bianchini (born May 27, 1961) is an American former professional football player who was a running back for one season with the New England Patriots of the National Football League (NFL). He also played in the Arena Football League (AFL) for the New England Steamrollers, Denver Dynamite, and Charlotte Rage. He played college football for the Hofstra Pride

== Early life and education ==
Bianchini was born on May 27, 1961, in East Islip, New York. He attended East Islip High School.

Bianchini played college football at Hofstra University from 1979 to 1982.

== Professional career ==
=== New England Patriots ===
In 1987, Bianchini was signed as a replacement player by the New England Patriots of the National Football League (NFL). He only played in week 6.

=== New England Steamrollers ===
In 1988, Bianchini played one game for the New England Steamrollers of the Arena Football League. On offense he had one pass attempt for 9 yards and a touchdown. He also had 5 rushes for 0 yards, and 2 catches for 13 yards. On defense he had two tackles.

=== Denver Dynamite ===
In 1989, Bianchini played 4 games for the Denver Dynamite. He had 9 rushes for 21 yards on offense. He also had one pass attempt which was completed for a 21-yard touchdown. On defense he had 8 tackles.

In 1990, he played 8 games. On offense he had 8 rushes for 24 yards and 9 catches for 75 yards. He also had one pass attempt which was completed for a 21-yard touchdown. On defense he had 17 tackles, a sack, and an interception that was returned three yards.

In 1991, he played 7 games. He had 4 catches for 69 yards and a touchdown. He even had one pass attempt, but it was intercepted. On defense he had a sack and 5 tackles.

=== Charlotte Rage ===
In 1992 he played 3 games for the Charlotte Rage. He had 4 rushes for 5 yards and 2 catches for 13 yards. He also had a pass attempt. On defense he had 9 tackles. The 1992 season was his final season.

== Later life ==
In 2007, Bianchini was inducted into the Minor League Football Hall of Fame.
