= Jim Valek =

American football player, coach, and executive (1928–2005)

Biographical details
- Born: January 25, 1928; Joliet, Illinois, U.S.
- Died: September 4, 2005 (aged 77); Columbia, South Carolina, U.S.

Playing career
- 1945–1948: Illinois
- Position: End

Coaching career (HC unless noted)
- 1952: Wichita (assistant)
- 1953–1958: LaSalle-Peru HS (IL)
- 1959–1960: Illinois (assistant)
- 1961–1965: Army (assistant)
- 1966: South Carolina (assistant)
- 1967–1970: Illinois
- 1973–1975: New England Patriots (ST)
- 1988: New York Knights

Administrative career (AD unless noted)
- 1976–1978: New England Patriots (assistant GM)

Head coaching record
- Overall: 8–32 (college); 2–10 (AFL)

James Joseph Valek (January 25, 1928 – September 4, 2005) was an American football player, coach, and executive. He served as the head football coach at the University of Illinois at Urbana–Champaign from 1967 to 1970, compiling a record of 8–32. Valek also coached the New York Knights, of the Arena Football League, to a 2–10 record in 1988.

== Head coaching record ==
=== College ===
Year	Team	Overall	Conference	Standing	Bowl/playoffs
Illinois Fighting Illini (Big Ten Conference) (1967–1970)
1967	Illinois	4–6	3–4	T–5th	
1968	Illinois	1–9	1–6	T–8th	
1969	Illinois	0–10	0–7	10th	
1970	Illinois	3–7	1–6	T–9th	
Illinois:		8–32	5–23		
Total:		8–32			
