= Walter Holman =

American football player (born 1959)

No. 30, 32
- Position: Running back / fullback / linebacker

Personal information
- Born: April 6, 1959 (age 67); Vaiden, Mississippi, U.S.
- Listed height: 5 ft 10 in (1.78 m)
- Listed weight: 215 lb (98 kg)

Career information
- College: West Virginia State

Career history
- Pittsburgh Maulers (1984); Washington Commandos (1987); Washington Redskins (1987); Detroit Drive (1988)

Awards and highlights
- ArenaBowl champion (1988); First-team All-Arena - FB/LB (1988); Second-team All-Arena - FB/LB (1987)

Career NFL statistics
- Games played: 3
- Attempts: 2
- Yards: 7
- Touchdowns: 0
- Stats at Pro Football Reference

Career AFL statistics
- Rush Attempts-Yards: 51-173
- Receptions-Yards: 11-76
- Tackles-Sacks: 35-2
- Touchdowns: 12
- Interceptions: 1
- Stats at ArenaFan.com

Walter Ree Holman (born April 6, 1959) is an American former professional football player who was a running back for the Washington Redskins of the National Football League (NFL). He also played in the United States Football League (USFL) for the Pittsburgh Maulers and in the Arena Football League (AFL) for the Washington Commandos and the Detroit Drive. He played college football for the West Virginia State Yellow Jackets.
