= Osia Lewis =

American football player (1962–2020)

- Lewis while at Vanderbilt

Profile
- Position: Fullback / Linebacker

Personal information
- Born: December 3, 1962; Anchorage, Alaska, U.S.
- Died: May 31, 2020 (aged 57); Nashville, Tennessee, U.S.
- Listed height: 5 ft 11 in (1.80 m)
- Listed weight: 235 lb (107 kg)

Career information
- High school: Tucson (Tucson, Arizona)
- College: Oregon State
- NFL draft: 1986: undrafted

Career history

Playing
- Chicago Bruisers (1987–1989); Albany Firebirds (1990)

Coaching
- Oregon State (1987–1988) Graduate assistant; Western Oregon State (1989–1990) Linebackers coach; Oregon State (1991–1992) Special teams coordinator & outside linebackers coach; Oregon State (1993–1996) Inside linebackers coach; Illinois (1997–2000) Defensive line coach; Illinois (2001–2002) Linebackers coach; New Mexico (2003–2005) Defensive coordinator & defensive line coach; New Mexico (2006–2007) Defensive coordinator & linebackers coach; UTEP (2008–2009) Defensive coordinator; Hartford Colonials (2010) Defensive coordinator; San Diego State (2011–2015) Defensive line coach; Vanderbilt (2016–2020) Outside linebackers coach

Awards and highlights
- Second-team All-Arena (1988); Second-team All-Pac-10 (1985)
- Stats at ArenaFan.com

Osia Lewis (December 3, 1962 – May 31, 2020) was an American football player and coach. He played college football at Oregon State University, and professionally in the Arena Football League (AFL) for four seasons with the Chicago Bruisers and Albany Firebirds. He was a football coach from 1987 to 2020.

== Early life and college ==
Lewis attended Tucson High School in Tucson, Arizona.

Lewis was a four-year letterman for the Oregon State Beavers from 1982 to 1985. He primarily played linebacker but also saw time at quarterback, safety and wide receiver for the Beavers. As a senior in 1985, he was named the team's Most Inspirational Player, served as team captain and earned All-Pac-10 and honorable mention All-America honors by the Associated Press. Lewis set school records for single-season defensive points, season fumble recoveries with four and career fumble recoveries with eight.

== Professional career ==
Lewis played for the Chicago Bruisers from 1987 to 1989, earning second-team All-Arena honors in 1988. He played for the Albany Firebirds in 1990.

== Coaching career ==
Lewis was an assistant coach for the Western Oregon Wolves of Western Oregon State College from 1989 to 1990.

He served as an assistant coach for the Oregon State Beavers of Oregon State University, working with linebackers and special teams from 1991 to 1996.

He was defensive line coach for the Illinois Fighting Illini of the University of Illinois at Urbana–Champaign from 1997 to 2000 before serving as linebackers coach from 2001 to 2002.

Lewis was defensive coordinator of the New Mexico Lobos of the University of New Mexico from 2003 to 2007 while also serving stints as defensive line and linebacker coach.

He served as defensive coordinator of the UTEP Miners of the University of Texas at El Paso from 2008 to 2009.

He was defensive coordinator of the Hartford Colonials of the United Football League in 2010.

Lewis served as defensive line coach of the San Diego State Aztecs of San Diego State University from 2011 to 2015.

In February 2016, he joined the Vanderbilt Commodores of Vanderbilt University as a senior defensive assistant and outside linebackers coach.

== Death ==
Lewis died May 31, 2020, from liver cancer. He was 57 years old.
