= Vince Courville =

American football player (born 1959)

No. 44, 83, 81, 21
- Position: Wide receiver

Personal information
- Born: December 5, 1959 (age 66); Galveston, Texas, U.S.
- Listed height: 5 ft 9 in (1.75 m)
- Listed weight: 170 lb (77 kg)

Career information
- High school: Ball (Galveston)
- College: Rice
- NFL draft: 1983: undrafted

Career history
- Montreal Concordes (1983)*; Los Angeles Raiders (1983)*; Houston Gamblers (1984–1985); New Jersey Generals (1986)*; Atlanta Falcons (1986)*; Dallas Cowboys (1986–1987); New York Knights (1988); Buffalo Bills (1988)*; Houston Oilers (1989)*; New York/New Jersey Knights (1991); Ohio Glory (1992)*
- * Offseason or practice squad member only

Awards and highlights
- Second-team All-Arena (1988)

Career NFL statistics
- Games played: 2
- Stats at Pro Football Reference

Career AFL statistics
- Games played: 12
- Receptions: 28
- Tackles: 48
- Pass deflections: 10
- Touchdowns: 5
- Stats at ArenaFan.com

Vincent Eric Courville (born December 5, 1959) is an American former professional football player who was a wide receiver in the National Football League (NFL) for the Dallas Cowboys. He was also a member of the Houston Gamblers in the United States Football League (USFL) and the New York Knights in the Arena Football League (AFL). He played college football for the Rice Owls.

== Early life ==
Courville attended Ball High School, where he practiced football and track. He enrolled at Ranger College. After one year he transferred to Texas Southern University, where he practiced football and track. As a sophomore, he was voted the Southwest Athletic Conference Track Man of the Year.

He transferred to Rice University after his sophomore season. As a junior, he was a reserve wide receiver, making 11 receptions for 218 yards (third on the team), a 19.8-yard average (third on the team) and 5 touchdowns (second on the team). He also was the Southwest Conference 100 metres champion. As a senior, he had 6 receptions for 103 yards (fifth on the team), a 17.2-yard average (tied for third on the team) and 2 touchdowns.

== Professional career ==
=== Montreal Concordes ===
In 1983, he signed with the Montreal Concordes of the Canadian Football League. He was released before the start of the season.

=== Los Angeles Raiders ===
Courville was signed as an undrafted free agent by the Los Angeles Raiders after the 1983 NFL draft because he had elite speed. He was viewed more as an athlete than a football player and had trouble catching the football. He was waived before the start of the season on August 29.

=== Houston Gamblers ===
On October 24, 1983, he signed with the Houston Gamblers of the United States Football League. The team used the run and shoot offense and had Jim Kelly as its starting quarterback.

In 1984, he was a reserve wide receiver, appearing in 8 games, while registering 4 receptions for 83 yards (ninth on the tam), a 20.8-yard average (led the team), one touchdown and 9 kickoffs for 171 yards. In 1985, he appeared in 18 games with one start, making 25 receptions for 473 yards (seventh on the team), a 18.9-yard average (led the team) and 4 touchdowns (fifth on the team).

On July 8, 1986, he was signed by the New Jersey Generals, but he would never play for the team after the league folded.

=== Dallas Cowboys ===
On December 20, 1986, he was signed as a free agent by the Dallas Cowboys. He was released on August 31, 1987.

After the NFLPA strike was declared on the third week of the 1987 season, those contests were canceled (reducing the 16 game season to 15) and the NFL decided that the games would be played with replacement players. He was signed to be a part of the Dallas replacement team that was given the mock name "Rhinestone Cowboys" by the media. He played in 2 games as a backup wide receiver and did not record any statistic. He was released on October 20.

=== New York Knights ===
In 1988, he played for the New York Knights of the Arena Football League and earned second-team All-Arena honors. He finished with 28 receptions for 313 yards, 3 touchdowns and 53 tackles.

=== Buffalo Bills ===
On August 1, 1988, he was signed by the Buffalo Bills. He was released on August 12.

=== Houston Oilers ===
On May 4, 1989, he was signed by the Houston Oilers. He was released on September 4.

=== New York/New Jersey Knights ===
On May 15, 1991, he signed with the New York/New Jersey Knights of the World League of American Football, where he was converted into a cornerback. He was released on April 17, 1992.

=== Ohio Glory ===
On May 19, 1992, he signed with the Ohio Glory of the World League of American Football. He was released before the start of the season.
