= Quinton Knight =

American football player (born 1963)

No. 65
- Position: Offensive lineman / Defensive lineman

Personal information
- Born: October 28, 1963 (age 63)
- Listed height: 6 ft 0 in (1.83 m)
- Listed weight: 265 lb (120 kg)

Career information
- College: Cal State Fullerton

Career history
- Toronto Argonauts (1987)*; New York Knights (1988); Denver Dynamite (1989–1990); Orlando Predators (1991); Detroit Drive (1992); Massachusetts Marauders (1994); Tampa Bay Storm (1994–1995); Miami Hooters (1995)
- * Offseason or practice squad member only

Awards and highlights
- ArenaBowl champion (1992); 3× First-team All-Arena (1988–1990)
- Stats at ArenaFan.com

Quinton Knight (born October 28, 1963) is an American former professional football lineman who played seven seasons in the Arena Football League (AFL) with the New York Knights, Denver Dynamite, Orlando Predators, Detroit Drive, Massachusetts Marauders, Tampa Bay Storm, and Miami Hooters. He played college football at Pasadena City College, Sam Houston State University, and California State University, Fullerton.

== Early life and college ==
Quinton Knight was born on October 28, 1963. He attended Clearwater High School in Clearwater, Florida.

Due to poor grades, Knight had to first play college football at Pasadena City College. He played at Pasadena for two years. He then transferred to Sam Houston State University, where he played one year for the Bearkats. Knight transferred again, this time to California State University, Fullerton. He redshirted his first season with the Cal State Fullerton Titans. During his final season of college football, Knight led the Titans in sacks with nine and also posted 57 tackles.

== Profesional career ==
Knight signed with the Toronto Argonauts of the Canadian Football League in 1987 after going undrafted in the 1987 NFL draft. However, he was soon released, with Knight stating "Two days before I was to leave, they called and said that they had oversigned and I was released."

Knight played in all 12 games for the New York Knights of the Arena Football League (AFL) in 1988, posting 13 solo tackles, seven assisted tackles, and nine sacks as the Knights finished 2–10. He was an offensive lineman/defensive lineman during his time in the AFL as the league played under ironman rules. Knight was named first-team All-Arena for his performance during the 1988 season.

Knight appeared in all four games for the Denver Dynamite of the AFL in 1989, recording two solo tackles, two assisted tackles, two sacks, one forced fumble, one fumble recovery, one pass breakup, and one blocked kick. The Dynamite finished the year with a 3–1 record and lost in the first round of the playoffs to the Pittsburgh Gladiators by a score of 39–37. Knight earned first-team All-Arena honors for the 1989 season. He played in all eight games for Denver in 1990, totaling 14 solo tackles, three assisted tackles, 5.5 sacks, two forced fumbles, and one fumble recovery. The Dynamite finished the season 4–4 and lost in the first round of the playoffs to the Dallas Texans 26–25. Knight was named first-team All-Arena for the third consecutive season.

Knight played in nine games for the AFL's Orlando Predators during the 1991 season, accumulating eight solo tackles, four assisted tackles, three sacks, and one pass breakup.

Knight appeared in nine games for the Detroit Drive in 1992, recording six solo tackles, one assisted tackle, 0.5 sacks, one forced fumble, and one fumble recovery. On August 22, 1992, the Drive won ArenaBowl VI against Knight's former team, the Predators, by a score of 56–38.

Knight began the 1994 AFL season by playing in five games for the Massachusetts Marauders, posting seven solo tackles, three assisted tackles, one sack, one fumble recovery, and one pass breakup.

Knight was signed by the Tampa Bay Storm near the end of the 1994 AFL season. He appeared in one game for the Storm that year but did not record any statistics. Tampa Bay lost in the first round of the playoffs to the Massachusetts Marauders 58–51. Knight re-signed with the Storm in early March 1995. He was placed on injured reserve in May 1995 before the start of the season.

On June 9, 1995, it was reported that Knight had been traded to the Miami Hooters for future considerations. He played in three games for the Hooters and recorded one forced fumble. He was waived on July 7, 1995.
