= Paul Williams (quarterback) =

American football player (born 1963)

Profile
- Position: Quarterback

Personal information
- Born: April 14, 1963 (age 63); Houston, Texas, U.S.
- Listed height: 6 ft 0 in (1.83 m)
- Listed weight: 195 lb (88 kg)

Career information
- High school: Marian Christian (Houston)
- College: Tarleton State

Career history
- Houston Oilers (1987); New England Steamrollers (1988); Maryland Commandos (1989)

Career AFL statistics
- Comp. / Att.: 43 / 93
- Passing yards: 464
- TD–INT: 4–7
- QB rating: 40.79
- Stats at ArenaFan.com

Paul Lewis Williams (born April 14, 1963) is an American former professional football quarterback who played two seasons in the Arena Football League (AFL) with the New England Steamrollers and Maryland Commandos. He played college football at Cisco Junior College, Stephen F. Austin State University, and Tarleton State University.

== Early life and college ==
Paul Lewis Williams was born on April 14, 1963, in Houston Texas. He played high school football at Marian Christian High School in Houston and earned all-state honors.

Williams first played college football at Cisco Junior College. He then transferred to play for the Stephen F. Austin Lumberjacks of Stephen F. Austin State University. He finished his college career with the Tarleton State Texans of Tarleton State University.

== Professional career ==
After his college career, Williams was reportedly invited to try out for the Dallas Cowboys but could not attend due to a leg injury he had suffered during his senior year at Tarleton State. He began the 1987 season playing semi-pro football for the Galveston Islanders. On September 23, 1987, he signed with the Houston Oilers of the National Football League (NFL) during the 1987 NFL players strike. He did not play in any games for the Oilers and was waived on October 7, 1987. Williams finished the 1987 season with the Islanders.

Williams played in 11 games for the New England Steamrollers of the Arena Football League (AFL) in 1988, completing 27 of 47 passes (57.4%) for 308 yards, three touchdowns, and four interceptions.

Williams played in two games for the Maryland Commandos of the AFL during the 1989 season, completing 16 of 46 passes (34.8%) for 156 yards, one touchdown, and three interceptions.
