= Jeff Faulkner =

US Virgin Islands gridiron football player (born 1964)

No. 90, 94, 93, 96
- Position: Defensive lineman

Personal information
- Born: April 4, 1964 (age 62); St. Thomas, U.S. Virgin Islands
- Listed height: 6 ft 4 in (1.93 m)
- Listed weight: 305 lb (138 kg)

Career information
- High school: American (Hialeah, Florida)
- College: Southern
- NFL draft: 1987: undrafted

Career history
- Kansas City Chiefs (1987); Chicago Bruisers (1988); Minnesota Vikings (1988–1989)*; Miami Dolphins (1990); Indianapolis Colts (1990); Phoenix Cardinals (1991–1992); New Orleans Saints (1993); Washington Redskins (1993); Tampa Bay Buccaneers (1995)*; New York Jets (1996); Orlando Predators (1997); Milwaukee Mustangs (1998); Orlando Predators (1998)
- * Offseason or practice squad member only

Awards and highlights
- ArenaBowl champion (1998); First-team All-Arena (1988)

Career NFL statistics
- Tackles: 81
- Sacks: 5.5
- Stats at Pro Football Reference

Career AFL statistics
- Tackles: 20
- Sacks: 1
- Receptions: 6
- Receiving yards: 70
- Touchdowns: 5
- Stats at ArenaFan.com

Jeffrey E. Faulkner (born April 4, 1964) is an American Virgin Islander former professional football defensive lineman in the National Football League (NFL) for the Kansas City Chiefs, Indianapolis Colts, Phoenix Cardinals, New Orleans Saints, Washington Redskins, and the New York Jets. He also played in the Arena Football League (AFL) for the Chicago Bruisers, Orlando Predators, and the Milwaukee Mustangs. He played college football at Southern University. He is distinguished as being the first Virgin Islander and St. Thomian to play in the NFL.
