= Lewis Bennett =

American football player (born 1963)

No. 87
- Position: Wide receiver

Personal information
- Born: August 4, 1963 (age 63); Jacksonville, Florida, U.S.
- Listed height: 5 ft 11 in (1.80 m)
- Listed weight: 175 lb (79 kg)

Career information
- High school: William M. Raines
- College: Florida A&M

Career history
- Tampa Bay Bandits (1986)*; New York Giants (1987)
- * Offseason or practice squad member only
- Stats at Pro Football Reference

Lewis Bonaparte Bennett II (born August 4, 1963) is an American former professional football player who was a wide receiver for the New York Giants of the National Football League (NFL). He played college football for the Florida A&M Rattlers. He also played in the Arena Football League for the New York Knights.

In 1988, he was charged with murdering his wife.
