= Urban Lounge =

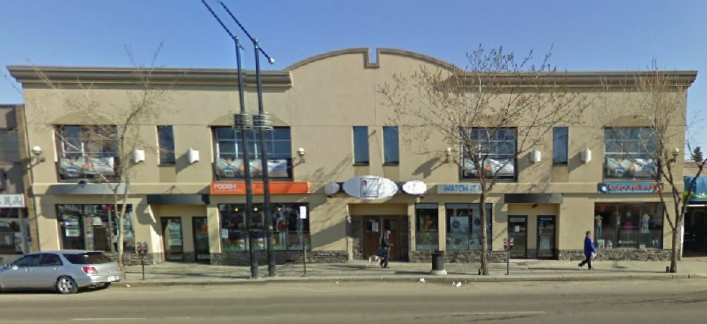
- Urban Lounge in 2008

General information
- Type: Bar, live music venue
- Location: Edmonton, Alberta, 8111 105 St (1996-2005); 10544 82 Ave (2005-2012)
- Coordinates: 53.518371°N 113.502378°W
- Opened: 1996; Relocated 2005
- Owner: Tim Fuhr

Other information
- Seating capacity: 600

Urban Lounge was a historic live music venue in Edmonton, Alberta, Canada.

== Background ==
Urban Lounge first opened at 8111 105 St in 1996. Beginning in the late 1990s, Urban Lounge became a prominent music venue in Edmonton with a weekly open mic and one of the largest stages for the city's local music scene. The venue was owned by Edmonton entrepreneur Tim Fuhr.

== Construction and specs ==
The initial 8111 105 St building was a standalone west-facing structure with a patio. In 2005, Urban Lounge relocated to the second floor of Old Strathcona's 10544 82 Avenue building.

The venue's original location was not as well-equipped for live music as the second location. For example, in December 2000, Canadian band Our Lady Peace was scheduled to perform at Urban Lounge as part of a "small club tour" promoting their album Spiritual Machines; several days before the concert however, the Edmonton Journal wrote that "according to Sony, the Urban Lounge was too small to accommodate the band's equipment and stage gear," so the concert changed venues.

The 10544 82 Avenue building was made of reinforced concrete and had four tenant businesses on the main floor. In March 2007, the roof of Urban Lounge collapsed requiring extensive repair and renovation. When Urban Lounge reopened in 2007 following renovations, owner Tim Fuhr stated "we brought in a $300,000 sound-and-light show. It's all state-of-the-art production. It'll probably be the best live room of its size in Western Canada, if not all of Canada."

== Concert history ==
In the late 1990s, Urban Lounge hosted performances by Alannah Myles, Lawrence Gowan of Styx, and Alfie Zappacosta amongst others. The early 2000s saw performances from artists such as Joel Plaskett, Wide Mouth Mason, Nick Walsh, Rich Hope, Ann Vriend, Robin Black, Thornley, and Mocking Shadows.

Following the roof decay in March 2007, the venue hosted a grand reopening in October 2007. For the grand reopening, the venue booked a week of concerts featuring Danko Jones, Marianas Trench, Sloan, Default, and Ten Second Epic. In 2008, Maceo Parker closed the Edmonton International Jazz Festival at Urban Lounge.

From 1998 to 2008, Urban Lounge was a venue at Edmonton International Fringe Festival. In 1999, the Edmonton Journal ranked Urban Lounge as one of the "worst venues" at the Edmonton Fringe because "bar noise distracted from the productions. In 2005, the Edmonton Journal rated Urban Lounge Edmonton's "best place for loud, live music." In November 2005, the venue was fined $4000 CAD for overcrowding.

== Partnerships ==
Throughout the early 2000s, Calgary's CJAY-FM party bus regularly took patrons to Urban Lounge.

== Notable patrons ==
- Rahim Jaffer
- Gene Zwozdesky
- Raj Pannu

== Aftermath ==
=== The Old Strathcona Rack (2012–2017) ===
In 2012, Urban Lounge was sold and renamed The Old Strathcona Rack, under the management of Oil City Hospitality Group.

=== Beercade (2017 – present) ===
As of 2017, the establishment has been rebranded as Beercade. Unlike Urban Lounge, Beercade follows the Barcade format and features many arcade games.
