= Matt Stevens (quarterback) =

American football player (born 1964)

- Stevens in 2026

No. 1, 11
- Position: Quarterback

Personal information
- Born: July 30, 1964 (age 62); Sulphur, Louisiana, U.S.
- Listed height: 6 ft 0 in (1.83 m)
- Listed weight: 190 lb (86 kg)

Career information
- High school: Fountain Valley (Fountain Valley, California)
- College: UCLA
- NFL draft: 1987: undrafted

Career history
- Kansas City Chiefs (1987); Los Angeles Cobras (1988)

Awards and highlights
- Second-team All-Arena (1988)

Career NFL statistics
- Passing attempts: 57
- Passing completions: 32
- Completion percentage: 56.1%
- TD–INT: 1–1
- Passing yards: 315
- Passer rating: 70.4
- Stats at Pro Football Reference

Career AFL statistics
- Attempts: 361
- Completions: 199
- Passing yards: 2,535
- TD-INT: 50-13
- Passer rating: 96.9
- Stats at ArenaFan.com

Matthew Anthony Stevens (born July 30, 1964) is an American former professional football player who was a quarterback in the National Football League (NFL) and Arena Football League (AFL). He played one season in the NFL for the Kansas City Chiefs during the 1987 NFL strike. He played in three games for the Chiefs, starting two of them. He played high school football at Fountain Valley High School and college football for the UCLA Bruins.

== Career ==
In the 1986 UCLA vs. USC game, Karl Dorrell was on the receiving end of a play from Stevens that the Los Angeles Times dubbed "Hail Mary, and in your face.." On the last play of the first half, UCLA quarterback Stevens threw a Hail Mary pass, which was tipped into the hands of the flanker—Dorrell—to put the Bruins up 31–0 at the half. The Bruins went on to win 45–25.

Stevens was the quarterback for UCLA in the 1986 Rose Bowl in which the Bruins defeated the Iowa Hawkeyes 45–28. Stevens was 16–26 for 169 yards and one touchdown.

Stevens is currently the football color analyst on UCLA's flagship radio station. In 2001, Stevens was voted "Color Analyst of the Year" by the Southern California Broadcasters Association.
