= Oil City (Alberta) =

Epithet used in Alberta, Canada

Oil City is an epithet in the province of Alberta, Canada, derived from the province's first major oil well and subsequently used to refer to Northern Albertan cities such as Edmonton and Fort McMurray. The epithet has been employed in the branding of businesses throughout the province, and as of 2021, yellow pages in Alberta show that at least twenty businesses continue to use the epithet in their business names.

== Waterton ==
In 1892, the site of western Canada's first producing oil well in Waterton Lakes National Park was named Oil City. Oil was struck just over 300 meters below the surface. Although the site was named in 1892, it was not until 1901 that extensive extraction took place under the leadership of Allan P. Patrick and John Leeson with the Rocky Mountain Development Company. By 1906 the oil well had stopped producing.

In 2010, Ernest George Mardon wrote that "Oil City in Waterton National Park was a thriving community in 1902, but has totally disappeared."

In 1968, Waterton's Oil City was designated as a National Historic Site of Canada. The restoration of the site included the construction of a replica oil rig monument in memory of Oil City's historic advancement of Alberta's oil industry.

== Edmonton ==
Edmonton's slogan "The Oil Capital of Canada" was instituted in 1947 and is the city's only slogan to be officially adopted by Edmonton City Council. As of 2020, a number of businesses in the Edmonton metropolitan region continue to employ the oil city nomenclature such as Oil City Crane Service, Oil City Energy, Oil City Signs, and Oil City Vapes. Since 2005, the city has hosted the Oil City Roller Derby.

=== Hockey teams ===
Edmonton's historic designation as "Oil City" is also related to the fact that both of Edmonton's hockey teams are named in connection with Alberta's oil industry: the Edmonton Oilers and the Edmonton Oil Kings. The history of the team names are as follows: On 1 November 1971, the Edmonton Oilers got one of the 12 existing WHA establishments. The first proprietor was Bill Hunter. When Hunter was deciding on a name for his WHA team in 1972, he first called it the Alberta Oilers. Oil is one of Alberta's most prevalent natural resources; the province has the world's third-largest reserves behind Venezuela and Saudi Arabia. Oilers was a nickname for Hunter's Junior A team in Edmonton, the Oil Kings. In 1973, the team's name was changed to the Edmonton Oilers. In 1979, when four teams from the WHA were absorbed by the NHL, the Oilers retained their name.

=== Oil City Roadhouse ===
Oil City Roadhouse, formerly located at 10736 on Jasper Avenue, was one of many Edmonton businesses employing the reference to Edmonton as Oil City. Oil City was owned and operated by the Oil City Hospitality Group. The Edmonton Journal wrote that "the country-themed room, located in the old Saveco building between 107th and 108th Streets, was one of the most notorious venues in downtown Edmonton." In 2012, Oil City Roadhouse closed and was replaced by an establishment named Knoxville's Tavern.

== Other cities ==
Business such as Oil City Press and Oil City Express have offices in Calgary. Fort McMurray has also been referred to as Oil City due to its proximity to the Athabasca oil sands.

== Responses ==
The phrase "Oil City" and its relationship to Alberta's oil and gas industry and the sociology of place identity continues to be discussed in scholarship. In a paper published in Environmental Ethics titled "This is Oil Country: The Alberta Tar Sands and Jacques Ellul's Theory of Technology," philosopher Nathan Kowalsky and sociologist Randolph Haluza-DeLay discuss the relationship between cultural identity and the oil industry in Alberta. In a section titled “I Am Alberta Oil: the Naturalization of Technical Identity" Kowalsky and Haluza-DeLay write that in Alberta, "tar sands advocates imply that oil is a necessary component of one’s own identity."

Alberta's "oil identity" has also been discussed by writers Andrew Nikiforuk and Stephanie LeMenager. In her essay, "Imaginary Alberta: Is It A More Appealing Place," Edmontonian writer Linda Goyette similarly discusses frustration while filling up with gas in Edmonton and asking oneself "why can't I write about a more appealing Alberta?"

== See also ==
- Athabasca oil sands
- Edmonton Oil Kings
- Edmonton Oilers
- Economy of Alberta
- List of city nicknames and slogans in Alberta
- Petroleum industry in Canada
