= Los Angeles Cobras =

Arena football team

Logo

General information
- Founded: 1988
- Folded: 1988
- Headquartered: Los Angeles Sports Arena in Los Angeles, California
- Colors: Navy, goldenrod, white

Personnel
- Head coach: Ray Willsey

Team history
- Los Angeles Cobras (1988)

Home fields
- Los Angeles Memorial Sports Arena (1988)

League / conference affiliations
- Arena Football League (1988)

Playoff appearances (1)
- 1988

The Los Angeles Cobras were a professional arena football team based in Los Angeles, California that played one season (1988) in the Arena Football League.

== History ==
On March 16, 1988, it was announced that team would be nicknamed the Cobras, as well as the introduction of head coach Ray Willsey. The Cobras played their home games at the Los Angeles Sports Arena, which they shared with the Los Angeles Clippers of the National Basketball Association. The team's logo consisted of an interlocking "LA" in which the left upright of the "A" was formed by the hooded head and "neck" of a cobra.

The team debuted April 30, 1988 against the New York Knights. The Cobras started the season 0–3, but finished the season 5–3–1, clinching a playoff spot.

Despite a lineup that featured former NFL all-pro receiver Cliff Branch, ex-UCLA quarterback Matt Stevens and future Arena Football Hall of Famer Gary Mullen, Los Angeles drew dismal crowds: just 7,507 per game, second-worst in the AFL. The Cobras lost in the semifinals to the Chicago Bruisers, 29–16. It turned out to be their last game ever as the Cobras folded after the 1988 season, temporarily cutting the league down.

== Season-by-season ==
Season records
Season	W	L	T	Finish	Playoff results
1988	5	6	1	4th	Lost Week 1 (Chicago 29-16)
Totals	5	7	1	(including playoffs)	

== Notable players ==
=== Roster ===
1988 Los Angeles Cobras roster
Quarterbacks: 5 Eric Beavers; 28 Michael Mendoza; 10 Matt Stevens; Wide receivers/Defensive backs: 42 Mike Benson; 22 Cliff Branch; 26 Derrick Donald; 20 Joe Kelly; 1 Gary Mullen	Running backs/Linebackers: 42 Rob DeVita; 65 Paul Green; 40 Yepi Pauu; 34 Richard Prather; 32 Ed Zeman; Offensive linemen/Defensive linemen: -- Eric Arrington; 55 Brian Clark; 60 Chuck Harris; 72 Dwayne Jackson; 84 Michael Jones; 80 Tony Palamara; 82 Louis Sorrentino; 64 Dester Stowers; 66 Wes Walton	Wide receivers/Linebackers: 92 Wade Lockett; 93 Matthew McKnight; 25 Richard Rodgers; Kickers: 2 Nick Mike-Mayer; 2 Ken Olson; 2 Marty Zendejas; Rookies in italics Roster updated February 5, 2013; 28 Active, 0 Inactive, 0 PS

=== Arena Football League Hall of Famers ===
Los Angeles Cobras Hall of Famers
No.	Name	Year inducted	Position(s)	Years w/ Cobras
1	Gary Mullen	1995	WR/DB	1988

=== All-Arena players ===
The following Cobras players were named to All-Arena Teams:

- QB Matt Stevens
- WR/DB Gary Mullen

== Notable coaches ==
=== Head coaches ===
Name	Term	Regular season				Playoffs		Awards
Name	Term	W	L	T	Win%	W	L	Awards
Ray Willsey	1988	5	6	1	.458	0	1	

=== Staff ===
- Head coach: Ray Willsey
- Assistant coach: Lew Erber
- Running back & special teams coach: Russ Steele
- Football operations coordinator: Larry Westbrook
- Trainer: Nick Ortenzo
- Equipment manager: Marty Hopkins

== Media ==
- The Cobras are also featured in the film Kinjite: Forbidden Subjects starring Charles Bronson. One scene takes place during a Cobras/Bruisers game, presumably the final regular season contest played July 14, 1988 (this game also had the distinction of ending 37-37, making it the first tie game in arena football history). The film was released in early 1989.
- The Cobras were also featured as an unlockable team in EA Sports' Arena Football.
