= ArenaBowl II =

Detroit Drive (2nd)	Chicago Bruisers (1st)
24	13
	1	2	3	4	Total
DET	7	14	0	3	24
CHI	7	0	0	6	13
- Date: July 30, 1988
- Stadium: Rosemont Horizon; Rosemont, Illinois
- MVP: Steve Griffin, WR/DB, Detroit: Dwayne Dixon, WR/LB, Detroit (Ironman of the Game)
- Attendance: 15,018
- Winning coach: Tim Marcum
- Losing coach: Perry Moss

TV in the United States
- Network: ESPN
- Announcers: Roger Twibell and Steve Raible

Arena Bowl '88 (or Arena Bowl II) was the Arena Football League's second championship game. The game featured the number 2 Detroit Drive (9–3) against the number 1 Chicago Bruisers (10–1–1). With 37 combined points it is the lowest-scoring ArenaBowl in history. Chicago's 13 points are the fewest points by a single team in Arenabowl history.

== Game summary ==
The Drive scored first when Quarterback Rich Ingold on a one-yard touchdown run, while the Bruisers scored with Quarterback Ben Bennett completing a three-yard touchdown pass to WR/DB Mike McDade.

In the second quarter, Detroit took control with FB/LB Walter Holman getting an eight-yard touchdown run, while fellow FB/LB Jim Browne got a two-yard touchdown run.

After a scoreless third quarter, Chicago managed to respond with FB/LB Billy Stone getting a 10-yard touchdown run (with a failed two-point conversion).

Afterwards, the Drive wrapped up its first ArenaBowl title with kicker Novo Bojovic getting a 17-yard field goal.

== Scoring summary ==
1st Quarter

- DET - Ingold 1 run (Bojovic kick)
- CHI - McDade 3 pass from Bennett (Morales kick)

2nd Quarter

- DET - Holman 8 run (Bojovic kick)
- DET - Browne 2 run (Bojovic kick)

4th Quarter

- CHI - Stone 10 run (Morales kick failed)
- DET - FG Bojovic 5
