= New York Knights (arena football) =

Arena football team

Logo

General information
- Founded: 1988
- Folded: 1988
- Headquartered: Madison Square Garden in New York City, New York
- Colors: Navy, red, black, white

Personnel
- Owner: Russell Berry
- Head coach: Jim Valek

Team history
- New York Knights (1988)

Home fields
- Madison Square Garden (1988)

League / conference affiliations
- Arena Football League (1988): East Division (1988)

The New York Knights were an Arena Football League (AFL) team based in New York City. They played in the league for one season, 1988. They played their home games at Madison Square Garden. After going 2–10 overall in their only season the team ceased operations. The league then went several years before attempting to re-enter the nation's largest media market with the New York CityHawks.

== History ==
The Knights became an expansion team of the Arena Football League in 1988. The team announced Jim Valek as the first coach in franchise history. The team featured a couple of players from the 1987 New York Giants replacement team, including starting quarterback Jim Crocicchia and his primary receiver Edwin Lovelady, but its desire to fans was questioned before the team began playing games. The Knights won their first game in franchise history, 60–52 over the Los Angeles Cobras. During the Knights home opener, a fight erupted in the stands, and items were thrown on the field. After winning the season opener, the Knights lost 4 straight games before returning home to a smaller crowd, losing 22–36 to the Cobras. The Knights would lose 8 straight games before they defeated the Cobras 40–30 in Los Angeles. The team folded after a disappointing 2–8 season.

== Notable players ==
=== Roster ===
New York Knights roster
Quarterbacks: -- Mark Casale; 2 Jim Crocicchia; -- Stan Yagiello; Wide receivers/Defensive backs: -- Lewis Bennett; 25 Greg Best; -- Vince Courville; -- Elbert Gray; -- Stan Hunter; -- Edwin Lovelady; -- Jim Mauro; -- Pat Morrison; -- Rex Motes; -- O'Donovan Murphy; -- Ken Sanders; -- Al Washington	Fullbacks/Linebackers: -- Derek Hughes; -- Al Neri; 32 Johnny Shepherd; Offensive linemen/Defensive linemen: -- Alec Gibson; -- Mark Grandy; 64 Walter Housman; -- Chris Jones; -- Quinton Knight; -- John Reed; -- A. J. Sebastianelli; -- Pete Walters	Wide receivers/Linebackers: -- Mark Streeter; Kickers *** Patrick Ragusa *** Injured Reserve: -- Jack Kratochvil; -- Eric Schubert; Rookies in italics Roster updated February 27, 2013; 29 Active, 0 Inactive, 0 PS → More rosters

=== All-Arena players ===
The following Knights players were named to All-Arena Teams:

- WR/DB Vince Courville
- OL/DL Quinton Knight

== Head coaches ==
Name	Term	Regular season				Playoffs		Awards
Name	Term	W	L	T	Win%	W	L	Awards
Jim Valek	1988	2	10	0	.167	0	0	

== Season results ==
ArenaBowl champions	ArenaBowl appearance	Division champions	Playoff berth

Season	League	Conference	Division	Regular season			Postseason results
Season	League	Conference	Division	Finish	Wins	Losses	Postseason results
New York Knights
1988	AFL	-	—	6th	2	10	
Total					2	10	(includes only regular season)
Total					0	0	(includes only the postseason)
Total					2	10	(includes both regular season and postseason)
