= 1988 Arena Football League season =

- League: Arena Football League
- Sport: Arena football
- Duration: April 28, 1988 – July 30, 1988

Regular season
- Season champions: Chicago Bruisers
- Season MVP: Ben Bennett (CHI)

League postseason
- 1 vs 4 Semifinals champions: Chicago Bruisers
- 1 vs 4 Semifinals runners-up: Los Angeles Cobras
- 2 vs 3 Semifinals champions: Detroit Drive
- 2 vs 3 Semifinals runners-up: Pittsburgh Gladiators

ArenaBowl II
- Champions: Detroit Drive
- Runners-up: Chicago Bruisers
- Finals MVP: Steve Griffin (DET)

AFL seasons
- ← 1987 1989 →

AFL teams

The 1988 Arena Football League season was the second season of the Arena Football League. The league champions were the Detroit Drive, who defeated the Chicago Bruisers in ArenaBowl II.

== Standings ==
1988 Arena Football League standings
| Team | W | L | T | PCT | PF | PA | PF (Avg.) | PA (Avg.) | STK |
|---|---|---|---|---|---|---|---|---|---|
| xy-Chicago Bruisers | 10 | 1 | 1 | .875 | 526 | 374 | 43.8 | 31.2 | T 1 |
| x-Detroit Drive | 9 | 3 | 0 | .750 | 472 | 310 | 39.3 | 25.8 | W 7 |
| x-Pittsburgh Gladiators | 6 | 6 | 0 | .500 | 507 | 491 | 42.3 | 40.9 | L 1 |
| x-Los Angeles Cobras | 5 | 6 | 1 | .458 | 463 | 449 | 38.6 | 37.4 | T 1 |
| New England Steamrollers | 3 | 9 | 0 | .250 | 335 | 511 | 27.9 | 42.6 | W 1 |
| New York Knights | 2 | 10 | 0 | .167 | 342 | 510 | 28.5 | 42.5 | L 2 |

y – clinched regular-season title

x – clinched playoff spot

== Playoffs ==
Semifinals
1 | Chicago | 29
4 | Los Angeles | 16
2 | Detroit | 34
3 | Pittsburgh | 25

ArenaBowl II
1 | Chicago | 13
2 | Detroit | 24

== Awards and honors ==
=== Regular season awards ===
| Award | Winner | Position | Team |
|---|---|---|---|
| Most Valuable Player | Ben Bennett | Quarterback | Chicago Bruisers |
| Ironman of the Year | Dwayne Dixon | Wide Receiver/Defensive Back | Detroit Drive |
| Coach of the Year | Perry Moss | Head coach | Chicago Bruisers |

=== All-Arena team ===
| Position | First team | Second team |
|---|---|---|
| Quarterback | Ben Bennett, Chicago | Matt Stevens, Los Angeles |
| Fullback/Linebacker | Walter Holman, Detroit | Osia Lewis, Chicago |
| Wide receiver/Defensive back | Gary Mullen, Los Angeles; Carl Aikens, Jr., Chicago; Dwayne Dixon, Detroit | Jim Hockaday, New England; Vince Courville, New York; Reggie Smith, Chicago |
| Offensive lineman/Defensive lineman | Quinton Knight, New York; Craig Walls, Pittsburgh; Jeff Faulkner, Chicago | Kevin Murphy, New England; Sylvester Bembery, New England; Jon Roehlk, Detroit |
| Defensive specialist | Durwood Roquemore, Chicago | Nate Miller, Detroit |
| Kicker | Marco Morales, Chicago | Novo Bojovic, Detroit |

== Team notes ==
| # of Teams | Expansion Teams | Folded Teams | Suspended Teams | Teams returning from previous season | Teams returning after hiatus | Relocated Teams | Name Changes |
|---|---|---|---|---|---|---|---|
| 6 | Detroit Drive; Los Angeles Cobras; New England Steamrollers; New York Knights | | Denver Dynamite; Washington Commandos | Chicago Bruisers; Pittsburgh Gladiators | | | |
