= List of Arena Football League teams =

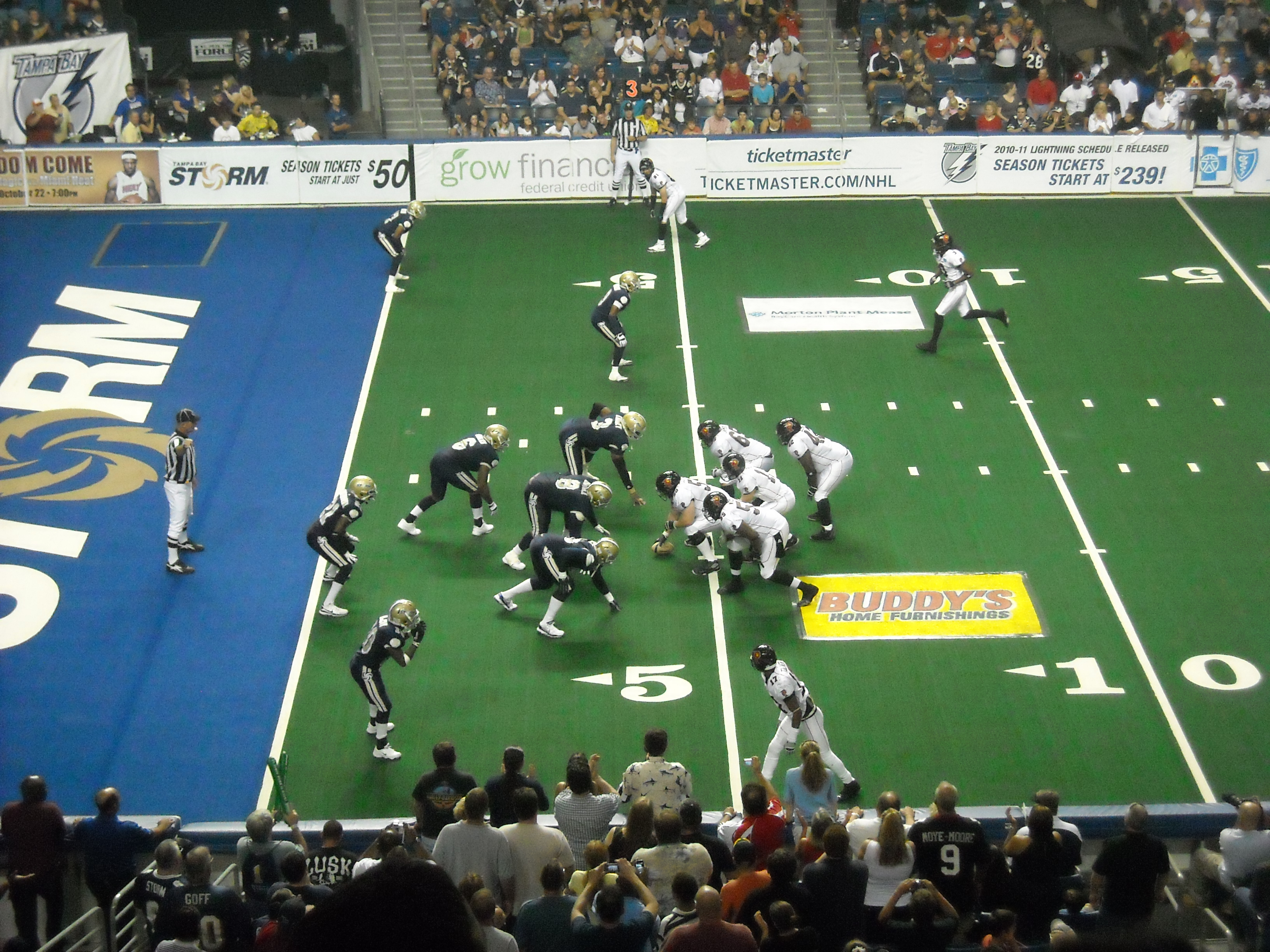
The Tampa Bay Storm, formed as the Pittsburgh Gladiators in 1987, was the oldest franchise in the AFL (and the last remaining inaugural team) before folding in 2017.

The following is a list of Arena Football League (AFL) teams. The AFL was a professional indoor American football league based in the United States.

The AFL started play with the 1987 season, featuring the Chicago Bruisers, the Denver Dynamite, the Pittsburgh Gladiators and the Washington Commandos. The Pittsburgh franchise became the Tampa Bay Storm in 1991 – they were the only franchise remaining from the inaugural 1987 season still operating until the 2017 season; after that season, they announced an indefinite suspension of operations, leaving open the possibility of returning in the future if the league were restructured in such a way as to make operation of a franchise potentially profitable.

As of the 2019 season, the final season in league history, 65 different franchises (operating under 85 different names when allowing for a franchise changing city or name) had competed in the AFL, of which 60 either left to compete in another indoor football league, suspended operations, or folded outright. At its height, the AFL featured 19 teams competing in the same season: 2001, 2004 and 2007.

Following the 2019 season, the AFL announced the closure of all its teams, but not the league itself. The league mulled over plans to operate with a touring format, with each week's games in a different arena and no set homes for any of its teams (much like the Premier Lacrosse League, BIG3, and most individual sports); however, league commissioner Randall Boe announced the league's filing for bankruptcy and cessation of operations on November 27, 2019.

== Franchises active at the time of the 2019 bankruptcy ==
Team	City	Arena	Founded	Joined
Albany Empire	Albany, New York	Times Union Center	2017	2018
Atlantic City Blackjacks	Atlantic City, New Jersey	Boardwalk Hall	2019	
Baltimore Brigade	Baltimore, Maryland	Royal Farms Arena	2016	2017
Columbus Destroyers	Columbus, Ohio	Nationwide Arena	1999	2019
Philadelphia Soul	Philadelphia, Pennsylvania	Wells Fargo Center	2004	
Washington Valor	Washington, DC	Capital One Arena	2016	2017

== Expansions and contractions ==
The Arena Football League expanded and contracted many times throughout its history. Between 1987 and 2018, every year in the AFL had at least one team fold, relocate, or change names. There were never two consecutive seasons in which the league had exactly the same lineup of cities. The league reached its maximum size in the 2001, 2004 and 2007 seasons, in which 19 teams competed in each instance. The league was then primarily contracting from 2011 to 2018, either dropping teams proving to be financially unfeasible or having teams depart because of concerns about the financial structure or travel distances. In 2019, the league had its first season in which all teams returned from the previous season, where the league had tied a record low of four active members.

Year	# of teams	Expansion teams	Folded teams	Teams in a new League	Suspended teams	Returning teams	Relocated teams	Name changes
1987	4	Chicago Bruisers; Denver Dynamite; Pittsburgh Gladiators; Washington Commandos						
1988	6	Detroit Drive; Los Angeles Cobras; New England Steamrollers; New York Knights			Denver Dynamite; Washington Commandos			
1989	5		Los Angeles Cobras; New England Steamrollers; New York Knights			Denver Dynamite; Maryland Commandos		Maryland Commandos (from Washington)
1990	6	Albany Firebirds; Dallas Texans	Chicago Bruisers					Washington Commandos (from Maryland)
1991	8	Columbus Thunderbolts; New Orleans Night; Orlando Predators	Washington Commandos				Pittsburgh → Tampa Bay Storm	
1992	12	Arizona Rattlers; Charlotte Rage; Cincinnati Rockers; Sacramento Attack; San Antonio Force	Denver Dynamite				Columbus → Cleveland Thunderbolts	
1993	10		New Orleans Night; San Antonio Force				Sacramento → Miami Hooters	
1994	11	Fort Worth Cavalry; Las Vegas Sting; Milwaukee Mustangs	Cincinnati Rockers; Dallas Texans				Detroit → Massachusetts Marauders	
1995	13	Connecticut Coyotes; Iowa Barnstormers; Memphis Pharaohs; St. Louis Stampede; San Jose SaberCats	Cleveland Thunderbolts		Massachusetts Marauders; Fort Worth Cavalry			
1996	15	Texas Terror					Las Vegas → Anaheim Piranhas; Fort Worth → Minnesota Fighting Pike (dormant from 1995)	Florida Bobcats (from Miami Hooters)
1997	14	Nashville Kats; New Jersey Red Dogs; New York CityHawks	Charlotte Rage; Connecticut Coyotes; Minnesota Fighting Pike; St. Louis Stampede				Memphis → Portland Forest Dragons	
1998	14		Anaheim Piranhas				Massachusetts Marauders → Grand Rapids Rampage (dormant for three years)	Houston Thunderbears (from Texas Terror)
1999	15	Buffalo Destroyers					New York → New England Sea Wolves	
2000	17	Carolina Cobras; Los Angeles Avengers					Portland → Oklahoma Wranglers	
2001	19	Chicago Rush; Detroit Fury					Albany → Indiana Firebirds; Iowa → New York Dragons; New England → Toronto Phantoms	New Jersey Gladiators (from New Jersey Red Dogs)
2002	16	Dallas Desperados	Florida Bobcats; Houston Thunderbears; Milwaukee Mustangs; Oklahoma Wranglers				Nashville → Georgia Force (Note: The history of the Kats stayed in Nashville, similar to the agreement made between the Cleveland Browns and Baltimore Ravens of the NFL.)	
2003	16	Colorado Crush	Toronto Phantoms				New Jersey → Las Vegas Gladiators	
2004	19	Austin Wranglers; New Orleans VooDoo; Philadelphia Soul					Buffalo → Columbus Destroyers	
2005	17	Nashville Kats	Carolina Cobras; Detroit Fury; Indiana Firebirds					
2006	18	Kansas City Brigade; Utah Blaze			New Orleans VooDoo			
2007	19					New Orleans VooDoo		
2008	17		Nashville Kats	Austin Wranglers (af2)			Las Vegas → Cleveland Gladiators	
2009	0		New Orleans VooDoo; Los Angeles Avengers		Arizona Rattlers; Chicago Rush; Cleveland Gladiators; Colorado Crush; Columbus Destroyers; Dallas Desperados; Georgia Force; Grand Rapids Rampage; Kansas City Brigade; New York Dragons; Orlando Predators; Philadelphia Soul; San Jose SaberCats; Tampa Bay Storm; Utah Blaze			
2010	15	Alabama Vipers*; Bossier–Shreveport Battle Wings*; Dallas Vigilantes; Iowa Barnstormers*; Jacksonville Sharks; Milwaukee Iron*; Oklahoma City Yard Dawgz*; Spokane Shock*; Tulsa Talons* (* Promoted from af2)				Arizona Rattlers; Chicago Rush; Cleveland Gladiators; Orlando Predators; Tampa Bay Storm; Utah Blaze		
2011	18	Pittsburgh Power	Oklahoma City Yard Dawgz			Kansas City Command; Philadelphia Soul; San Jose SaberCats	Alabama Vipers → Georgia Force; Bossier-Shreveport Battle Wings → New Orleans VooDoo	Kansas City Command (from Kansas City Brigade) Milwaukee Mustangs (from Milwaukee Iron)
2012	17		Dallas Vigilantes				Tulsa Talons → San Antonio Talons	
2013	14		Georgia Force; Kansas City Command		Milwaukee Mustangs			
2014	14	Los Angeles Kiss	Chicago Rush; Utah Blaze				Milwaukee Mustangs → Portland Thunder	
2015	12	Las Vegas Outlaws	Pittsburgh Power; San Antonio Talons	Iowa Barnstormers (Indoor Football League)				
2016	8		Las Vegas Outlaws; New Orleans VooDoo; San Jose SaberCats	Spokane Shock (Indoor Football League as Spokane Empire)				Portland Steel (from Portland Thunder)
2017	5	Baltimore Brigade; Washington Valor	Los Angeles Kiss; Orlando Predators; Portland Steel	Arizona Rattlers (Indoor Football League); Jacksonville Sharks (National Arena League)				
2018	4	Albany Empire	Tampa Bay Storm		Cleveland Gladiators			
2019	6	Atlantic City Blackjacks				Columbus Destroyers		
2020	0		Albany Empire; Atlantic City Blackjacks; Baltimore Brigade; Cleveland Gladiators; Columbus Destroyers; Philadelphia Soul; Washington Valor					
Year	# of teams	Expansion teams	Folded teams	Teams in a new League	Suspended teams	Returning teams	Relocated teams	Name changes

== List of franchises ==
Team	First AFL season	Final AFL season	Previous name(s)	Previous name(s) season(s)	Notes
Alabama Vipers	2010	2010	Tennessee Valley Vipers; Tennessee Valley Raptors	2000–2004, 2006–2009; 2005	Franchise founded in af2 in 2000, then moved to United Indoor Football in 2005. Rejoined af2 in 2006, then joined new AFL in 2010. Moved to Georgia and became the reincarnated Georgia Force for the 2011 season.
Albany Empire	2018	2019			Team closed and subsequently folded with league's 2019 bankruptcy.
Anaheim Piranhas	1994	1997	Las Vegas Sting	1994–1995	Reason for cession of operations: Owner C. David Baker became league Commissioner.
Arizona Rattlers	1992	2016			Moved to Indoor Football League.
Atlantic City Blackjacks	2019	2019			Team closed and subsequently folded with league's 2019 bankruptcy.
Austin Wranglers	2004	2007			Moved to af2, folded.
Baltimore Brigade	2017	2019			Team closed and subsequently folded with league's 2019 bankruptcy.
Carolina Cobras	2000	2004			
Charlotte Rage	1992	1996			
Chicago Politicians	1986	1986			Playtest game only.
Chicago Bruisers	1987	1989			
Chicago Rush	2001	2013			Suspended operations and never returned.
Cincinnati Rockers	1992	1993			
Cleveland Thunderbolts	1991	1994	Columbus Thunderbolts	1991	
Cleveland Gladiators	1997	2017	New Jersey Red Dogs; New Jersey Gladiators; Las Vegas Gladiators	1997–2000; 2001–2002; 2003–2007	Had planned to return in 2020 before the league went bankrupt.
Colorado Crush	2003	2008			Not to be confused with the Colorado Ice, which formed in 2007 in United Indoor Football (part of the Indoor Football League merger) and later took on the Crush name before folding after that league's 2017 season.
Columbus Destroyers	1999; 2019	2008; 2019	Buffalo Destroyers	1999–2003	Inactive from 2008 to 2019. Returned for the 2019 season, then closed and subsequently folded with the league's bankruptcy.
Connecticut Coyotes	1995	1996			Attempted and failed to sell the franchise.
Dallas Desperados	2002	2008			Replaced by Dallas Vigilantes
Dallas Texans	1990	1993			
Dallas Vigilantes	2010	2011			
Denver Dynamite	1987	1991			Inactive for 1988.
Detroit Fury	2001	2004			
Florida Bobcats	1992	2001	Sacramento Attack, Miami Hooters	1992, 1993–1995	
Fort Worth Cavalry	1994	1994			
Georgia Force	2002	2012			Inactive for 2010 season.
Grand Rapids Rampage	1998	2008			
Houston ThunderBears	1996	2001	Texas Terror	1996–1997	
Indiana Firebirds	1990	2004	Albany Firebirds	1990–2000	Albany Firebirds name and logo returned in af2 in 2009, replacing the Albany Conquest.
Iowa Barnstormers	1995	2014			Original franchise became the New York Dragons following 2000 season; the revived franchise launched in AF2 in 2008 and rejoined the AFL in 2010. Team left following the 2014 season for the Indoor Football League.
Jacksonville Sharks	2010	2016			Left the AFL for the new National Arena League.
Kansas City Command	2006	2012	Kansas City Brigade	2006–2008	Inactive for the 2010 season
Las Vegas Outlaws	2015	2015			
Los Angeles Avengers	2000	2008			
Los Angeles Cobras	1988	1988			
Los Angeles Kiss	2014	2016			
Massachusetts Marauders	1988	1994	Detroit Drive	1988–1993	
Miami Vise	1987	1987		Showcase game only.	
Milwaukee Mustangs	1994	2001			
Milwaukee Mustangs	2010	2012	Milwaukee Iron	2010	Inactive for the 2013 season, team moved to Portland for 2014 and became the Portland Thunder
Minnesota Fighting Pike	1996	1996			
Nashville Kats	1997	2007			Returned as the Nashville Kats in 2005.
New England Steamrollers	1988	1988			
New Orleans Night	1991	1992			
New Orleans VooDoo	2004	2008			Did not play 2006 season.
New Orleans VooDoo	2011	2015	Bossier–Shreveport Battle Wings	2010	Bossier-Shreveport moved to New Orleans and became the VooDoo after coming back from the af2.
New York Dragons	1995	2008	Iowa Barnstormers	1995–2000	Barnstormers name returned in 2010 with a new AFL team.
New York Knights	1988	1988			
Oklahoma Wranglers	1995	2001	Memphis Pharaohs, Portland Forest Dragons	1995–1996, 1997–1998	
Oklahoma City Yard Dawgz	2010	2010			
Orlando Predators	1991	2016			Suspended operations
Philadelphia Soul	2004	2019			Team closed and subsequently folded with the league's 2019 bankruptcy.
Pittsburgh Power	2011	2014			Suspended operations.
Portland Steel	2014	2016	Portland Thunder	2014–2015	
Rockford Metros	1986	1986			Playtest game only.
San Antonio Force	1992	1992			
San Antonio Talons	2012	2014	Tulsa Talons	1999–2011	Franchise started as the Tulsa Talons in af2 back in 1999. Joined the new AFL in 2010 and relocated to San Antonio in 2012.
San Jose SaberCats	1995	2015			
Spokane Shock	2010	2015			Franchise started in af2 in 2005. Joined the new AFL in 2010. Team left for the IFL after 2015 season. Team later folded in 2017, before being resurrected for the 2020 IFL season.
St. Louis Stampede	1995	1996			
Tampa Bay Storm	1987	2017	Pittsburgh Gladiators	1987–1990	Ceased operations
Toronto Phantoms	1997	2002	New York CityHawks, New England Sea Wolves	1997–1998, 1999–2000	
Utah Blaze	2006	2013			Suspended operations.
Washington Commandos	1987	1990	Maryland Commandos	1989	Did not play the 1988 season.
Washington Valor	2017	2019			Team closed and subsequently folded with the league's 2019 bankruptcy.

== See also ==
- List of Arena Football League arenas
