= List of arena football video games =

The following is a chronology of arena football video games. There have been five games released on the subject of arena football. The first game was Arena Football in 1988, which was re-designed and released in 1992 under the same name. Arena Football '95 was an unreleased game for the Atari Jaguar, but the prototype has since surfaced and it was subsequently released on the Jaguar by homebrew publishers. The most recent arena football game is Arena Football: Road to Glory, which was released on February 21, 2007. It was a sequel to the 2006 EA Sports title Arena Football.

To date, although several arena football leagues have come and gone, the only one to have lent a license to a video game product was the first version of the Arena Football League that had existed from 1987 until its bankruptcy in 2009.

== Chronology ==
Release date	Title	Platform	Developer	Publisher	Ref
1988	Arena Football	Commodore 64	Chris R. Bickford III	independent	
1993	Arena Football (re-release)	Commodore 64	Chris R. Bickford III	independent	
1995	Arena Football '95 (unreleased)	Atari Jaguar	V-Real Interactive	Atari	
May 18, 2000	Kurt Warner's Arena Football Unleashed	PlayStation	Midway	Midway	
February 7, 2006	Arena Football	PlayStation 2, Xbox	EA Sports	Electronic Arts	
March 3, 2006	Maximum-Football	Microsoft Windows	Wintervalley Software	Matrix Games	
February 21, 2007	Arena Football: Road to Glory	PlayStation 2	EA Sports	Electronic Arts	

== See also ==
- Chronology of baseball video games
- List of American football video games
