= Playtest =

Process of testing in game design

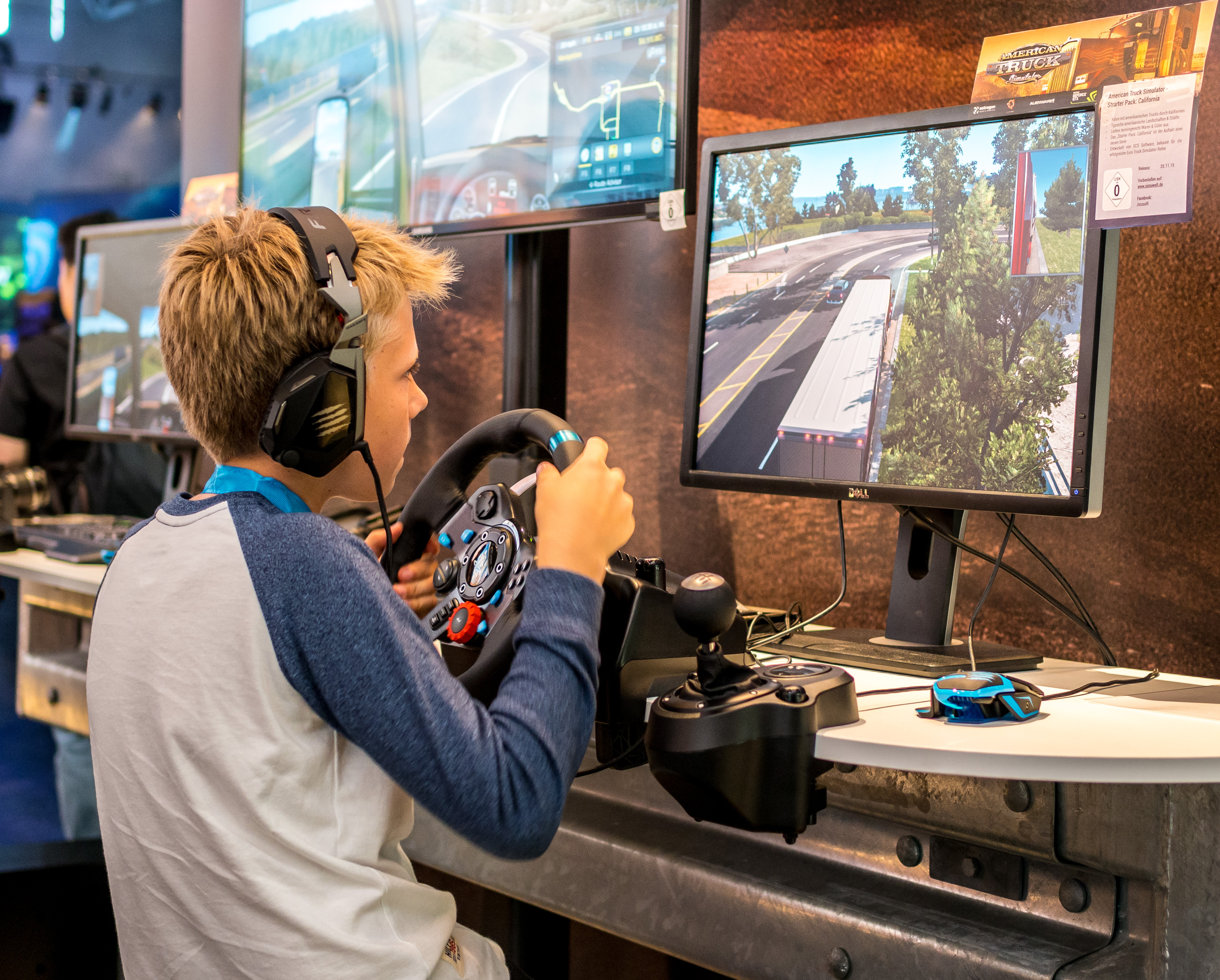
In the video game industry, playtesting refers to exposing a game in development to its intended audience to identify design flaws and gather feedback

A playtest is the process by which a game designer tests a new game for bugs and design flaws before releasing it to market. Playtests can be run "open", "closed", "beta", or otherwise, and are very common with board games, collectible card games, puzzle hunts, role-playing games, and video games, for which they have become an established part of the quality control process. An individual involved in testing a game is referred to as a playtester.

An open playtest could be considered open to anyone who wishes to join, or it may refer to game designers recruiting testers from outside the design group. Prospective testers usually must complete a survey or provide their contact information in order to be considered for participation. A closed playtest is an internal testing process not available to the public. Beta testing normally refers to the final stages of testing just before going to market with a product, and is often run semi-open with a limited form of the game in order to find any last-minute problems. With all forms of playtesting it is not unusual for participants to be required to sign a non-disclosure agreement, in order to protect the game designer's copyrights.

The word 'playtest' is also commonly used in unofficial situations where a game is being tested by a group of players for their own private use, or to denote a situation where a new strategy or game mechanic is being tested. Playtesting is a part of usability test in the process of game development.

== Video games ==
In the video game industry, playtesting refers specifically to the process of exposing a game in development (or some specific parts of it) to its intended audience in order to identify potential design flaws and gather feedback. Playtests are also used to help ensure that a product will be commercially viable upon release, by providing a way for consumers to play the game and provide their opinions. Playtesting should not be confused with quality assurance (QA) testing, in which professional testers look for and report specific software bugs to be fixed by the development team.

The first user research employee in the video game industry was Carol Kantor, who was employed by Atari, Inc. in 1976. Prior to this, the company had evaluated their games primarily via coin-collection data, however playtesting became a core method by which Atari evaluated the commercial viability of new games.

The Boston Globe described playtesting as "what everyone says is the least favorite part of the game-building operation". Steve Meretzky of Infocom said that "the first part of debugging is exciting; it's the first feedback. Somebody is actually playing your game. But by the end, you get sick of the little problems. You have spent three months inventing the game, and now you have to spend just as much time cleaning it up". The requirements for a person to be considered for participation in a playtest vary. Some playtests are open to anyone willing to volunteer, while others specifically target professional gamers and journalists. Some playtests also try to evaluate the game's appeal to players with different levels of experience by selecting players with varying exposure to the game's genre.

An example of a video game that made extensive use of open playtesting is Minecraft, which was made available for purchase in its pre-alpha stages. This both helped to financially support the game and provide feedback and bug testing during its early stages. Playtesting began even before the game features included multiplayer or the ability to save games. Mojang continues to make use of playtesting with Minecraft through weekly development releases, allowing players to experiment with unfinished additions to the game and provide feedback on them.

Some games make use of playtesting with only part of their content, leaving other important sections unexposed to the public. StarCraft II: Heart of the Swarm was tested in this manner; its playtest only included the multiplayer portion of the game, while the single-player campaign was not revealed. Heart of the Swarm is also an example of a playtest where average players are not being considered for entry; the initial wave of testers are only being selected from the ranks of professional gamers and from the media.

The open-source video game engine remake OpenRA, which recreates the early Command & Conquer games, publishes playtests to the public during the release process so that a broader range of testers can verify that new features don't introduce critical errors such as desync problems in the lockstep protocol and unwanted side effects on the gameplay can be balanced out prior to the next stable release.

Valve does not often make use of open playtesting, in keeping with the company's tradition of tightly controlling what information they release to the public. However, both Dota 2 and Counter-Strike: Global Offensive were openly playtested, with beta invites being distributed to (and in some cases by) volunteers. Valve also has a general beta signup form on their website; this survey is intended to recruit testers both in the Seattle/Bellevue area and from other locations, to test new games and gaming hardware that Valve is developing.

== Role-playing games ==
Due to the nature of pen-and-paper RPGs as opposed to video games, RPG playtests tend to focus more on ensuring that the game's mechanics are balanced and that the game flows smoothly in play. It is also more typical to see feedback from players cause game mechanics to be adjusted or altered, as it is usually easier to make such changes with an RPG than it would be with a video game.

An example of a role-playing game that was heavily playtested is the 5th edition of Dungeons & Dragons. For this game, Wizards of the Coast (WotC) used an open playtest with volunteers from their online community to evaluate the game as it was being developed. New playtest packets were distributed to the testers as WotC revised the game. WotC focused heavily on the results of this testing owing to the mixed reactions that the 4th edition rules received, showcasing another advantage of playtesting: helping to ensure that the final product will be a commercial success. The process produced feedback to WotC regarding which aspects of the game needed modifications or redesigns.

While D&D's 4th edition did see some playtesting, this was mainly restricted to classes added after the game's initial release, such as the monk and the bard. The playtest documents were released through the online Dragon Magazine, and were originally available for both subscribers and non-subscribers.

Fantasy Flight Games is running a playtest of the first installment of their new Star Wars RPG. This playtest is similar to Minecraft's in that the players must purchase the beta rules from Fantasy Flight before playing; the rules are not being released freely to the public. Updates made to the rules are released in PDF format on their website, but there is no word on whether playtesters will get a copy of the actual final draft.

Paizo Publishing ran a completely open playtest through the alpha and beta stages of their Pathfinder Roleplaying Game in 2008 and 2009, releasing the rules as free PDF's (and also in print for the beta version) on their web store. Anyone could join the playtest by downloading the documents, running games using them, and posting their feedback on the Paizo message boards. This playtest, which was active for over a year, is the longest-running open playtest in RPG history to date, as well as being one of the largest due to its unrestricted nature.

== Board games ==
In the board game industry, playtesting applies both to feedback gathered during the early design process as well as late stage exposure to the target audience by a game's publisher. Major types of board game testing include local testing — where a designer, developer, or publisher representative moderates the test in person, and remote testing, where groups receive copies of the game or files to assemble their own version.

Wizards of the Coast ran a public playtest of their new Dungeon Command miniatures game. In this case, they used the feedback generated on the rules to improve the game but also used feedback on the playtest itself to improve logistics on the D&D Next playtest.

Steve Jackson Games uses Munchkin players from the area around their offices to test new cards and expansions, as well as distributing playtest packages at conventions. According to the SJG website, this is done "so we [the developers] can observe carefully which cards work well, which jokes aren't as funny as we thought, and so on."

== Other games ==
The playtest concept has been carried over into a full-fledged sport. Jim Foster, inventor and founder of the Arena Football League, tested his concept of indoor football in a special one-time game in 1986. This game was organized at the behest of NBC in order to test the viability of the game's concept. The Rockford Metros and the Chicago Politicians played the game in Rockford, Illinois. The test proved successful, and four teams began the league's first season the following year.

== Disadvantages ==
The most dangerous risks with playtesting is that the playtest version of the game could be released over the internet beyond the constraints of what the publisher intended, particularly if it is a video game or something presented in an electronic format. There are ways to prevent this; for example, requiring all players to log in to the game's servers before it will launch, or implementing other forms of DRM.

Even if the game itself is not leaked, details regarding its gameplay still may be. It is likely that over the course of an open playtest, even one where testers signed NDAs, that some details will be leaked onto the web. This is a major risk for companies wishing to preserve secrecy, particularly in nations where there are no way to prevent leaks from occurring.

== See also ==
- Quality control
- Software testing
- User acceptance testing
