= Miami Vise =

Arena football team

Logo

General information
- Founded: 1987
- Folded: 1987
- Headquartered: Rosemont Horizon in Rosemont, Illinois
- Colors: Black, gold, white

Personnel
- Owner: Jerry Kurz
- Head coach: Ray Jauch
- President: Jerry Kurz

Team history
- Miami Vise (1987, "showcase game")

Home fields
- Rosemont Horizon (1987)

League / conference affiliations
- Arena Football League (1987)

The Miami Vise were an arena football team formed by Arena Football League (AFL) founder Jim Foster for the purposes of playing a "showcase game" on February 27, 1987, at the Rosemont Horizon against the Chicago Bruisers. Chicago's Eddie Phillips scored three touchdowns, including one in the last minute, but the Bruisers fell to the Vise by a score of 33–30. Today, this contest is known as the "showcase" game, as it had far more prestige and fanfare than the original 1986 test game between the Rockford Metros and Chicago Politicians.

This was the only game the Vise (whose name was a take on the popular TV series Miami Vice) ever played, and Miami did not get a team in the AFL until 1993. The Vise were not even a Florida-based team to begin with, as they were created out of Foster's imagination and consisted mostly of former college players located in the Midwest. At the time, the players were sworn to secrecy so fans would believe the team was located in Miami. Current Arena League Commissioner Jerry B. Kurz coached the Metros and Ray Jauch coached the Vise.
