= List of Arena Football League arenas =

The following is a list of Arena Football League (AFL) arenas. American and Canadian football is traditionally played outdoors on grass or artificial turf fields 120–150 yards (109.73–137.16 m) in length. However, arena football is played in covered climate-controlled multi-purpose venues. The field is comparable to the size of a National Hockey League rink, allowing 50 yards (46 m) for a scrimmage area. The AFL was established in 1987 and featured arena football teams across the United States until it folded in 2019. In 2014, the average AFL attendance was 8,473 per game. That year the Tampa Bay Storm averaged the most attendees per game with 11,402. The Orlando Predators were the least attended team in 2014 drawing an average of 5,421 per game. Talking Stick Resort Arena was the home of the Arizona Rattlers from 1992 until the team's departure in 2016, making it the longest operating AFL venue. The smallest venue to house an AFL team was the 5,000 seat West Palm Beach Auditorium, the home of the Florida Bobcats from 1996 to 1998. ArenaBowl IX at the Thunderdome (now Tropicana Field) in St. Petersburg, Florida on September 1, 1995, was the highest attended game in AFL history (25,087). Joe Louis Arena in Detroit has been host to four ArenaBowls (1989, 1990, 1991, 1993).

== Defunct teams ==
Team (former names)	Arena (former names)	Years used	Capacity	Opened	City
Alabama Vipers	Von Braun Center	2010	6,760	1975	Huntsville, Alabama
Albany Empire	Times Union Center; Pepsi Arena; Knickerbocker Arena	2018–2019	13,785	1990	Albany, New York
Anaheim Piranhas (1996–1997) (Las Vegas Sting) (1994–1995)	Arrowhead Pond; Anaheim Arena (1993)	1996–1997	17,174	1993	Anaheim, California
Anaheim Piranhas (1996–1997) (Las Vegas Sting) (1994–1995)	Thomas & Mack Center	1995	18,776	1983	Paradise, Nevada
Anaheim Piranhas (1996–1997) (Las Vegas Sting) (1994–1995)	MGM Grand Garden Arena	1994	17,157		Paradise, Nevada
Arizona Rattlers	Talking Stick Resort Arena; US Airways Center (2005–2014); America West Arena (1992–2005)	1992–2016	16,321	1992	Phoenix, Arizona
Atlantic City Blackjacks	Boardwalk Hall	2019–2019	10,500	1929	Atlantic City, New Jersey
Austin Wranglers	Frank Erwin Center	2004–2007	14,990	1977	Austin, Texas
Baltimore Brigade	Royal Farms Arena; First Mariner Arena; Baltimore Arena; Baltimore Civic Center	2017–2019	11,271	1962	Baltimore, Maryland
Bossier–Shreveport Battle Wings	CenturyTel Center	2010	12,000	2000	Bossier City, Louisiana
Carolina Cobras	Charlotte Coliseum	2003–2004	21,684	1988	Charlotte, North Carolina
Carolina Cobras	Raleigh Entertainment and Sports Arena; RBC Center (2002–2012)	2000–2002	18,176	1999	Raleigh, North Carolina
Charlotte Rage	Charlotte Coliseum	1992–1996	21,684	1988	Charlotte, North Carolina
Chicago Bruisers	Rosemont Horizon; Allstate Arena (1999–present)	1987–1989	16,143	1980	Rosemont, Illinois
Chicago Politicians (1986 Playtest Game)	N/A	N/A	N/A	N/A	N/A
Chicago Rush (2001–2013)	BMO Harris Bank Center; Rockford MetroCentre (1981–2011)	2013	5,895	1981	Rockford, Illinois
Chicago Rush (2001–2013)	Allstate Arena; Rosemont Horizon (1980–1999)	2001–	16,143	1980	Rosemont, Illinois
Cincinnati Rockers (1992–1993)	Riverfront Coliseum; U.S. Bank Arena; Firstar Center; The Crown	1992–1993	12,823	1975	Cincinnati, Ohio
Cleveland Gladiators (Las Vegas Gladiators) (New Jersey Gladiators) (New Jersey Red Dogs)	Quicken Loans Arena	2008–2017	18,926	1994	Cleveland, Ohio
Cleveland Gladiators (Las Vegas Gladiators) (New Jersey Gladiators) (New Jersey Red Dogs)	Orleans Arena	2007	9,500	2003	Paradise, Nevada
Cleveland Gladiators (Las Vegas Gladiators) (New Jersey Gladiators) (New Jersey Red Dogs)	Thomas & Mack Center	2003–2006	18,776	1983	Paradise, Nevada
Cleveland Gladiators (Las Vegas Gladiators) (New Jersey Gladiators) (New Jersey Red Dogs)	Continental Airlines Arena	1997–2002	19,040	1981	East Rutherford, New Jersey
Cleveland Thunderbolts (1992–1994) (Columbus Thunderbolts) (1991)	Coliseum at Richfield	1992–1994	18,544	1974	Richfield, Ohio
Cleveland Thunderbolts (1992–1994) (Columbus Thunderbolts) (1991)	Ohio Expo Center Coliseum	1991	7,000	1918	Columbus, Ohio
Colorado Crush	Pepsi Center	2003–2008	17,210	1999	Denver, Colorado
Columbus Destroyers (Buffalo Destroyers)	Nationwide Arena	2004–2008, 2019	17,171	2000	Columbus, Ohio
Columbus Destroyers (Buffalo Destroyers)	HSBC Arena; Marine Midland Arena (1996–1999)	1999–2003	18,690	1996	Buffalo, New York
Connecticut Coyotes (1995–1996)	Hartford Civic Center	1995–1996	15,150	1980	Hartford, Connecticut
Dallas Desperados	American Airlines Center	2002–2008	16,096	2001	Dallas, Texas
Dallas Texans (1990–1993)	Reunion Arena	1995–1996	17,001	1980	Dallas, Texas
Dallas Vigilantes	American Airlines Center	2010–2011	16,026	2001–2011	Dallas, Texas
Denver Dynamite (1987, 1989–1991)	McNichols Sports Arena	1987, 1989–1991	16,061	1975	Denver, Colorado
Detroit Fury (2001–2004)	The Palace of Auburn Hills	2001–2004	20,184	1988	Auburn Hills, Michigan
Florida Bobcats (1996–2001) (Miami Hooters) (1993–1995) (Sacramento Attack) (1992)	National Car Rental Center	1999–2001	17,900	1998	Sunrise, Florida
Florida Bobcats (1996–2001) (Miami Hooters) (1993–1995) (Sacramento Attack) (1992)	West Palm Beach Auditorium	1996–1998	5,000	1965	West Palm Beach, Florida
Florida Bobcats (1996–2001) (Miami Hooters) (1993–1995) (Sacramento Attack) (1992)	Miami Arena	1993–1995	14,696	1988	Miami, Florida
Florida Bobcats (1996–2001) (Miami Hooters) (1993–1995) (Sacramento Attack) (1992)	ARCO Arena	1992	12,632	1988	Sacramento, California
Fort Worth Cavalry (1994)	Fort Worth Convention Center	1994	11,200	1965	Fort Worth, Texas
Georgia Force	Arena at Gwinnett Center	2003–2004, 2008, 2010–2012	11,500	2003	Duluth, Georgia
Georgia Force	Philips Arena	2002, 2005–2007	18,545	1999	Atlanta, Georgia
Grand Rapids Rampage	Van Andel Arena	1998–2008	10,834	1996	Grand Rapids, Michigan
Houston Thunderbears (1998–2001) (Texas Terror) (1996–1997)	Compaq Center; The Summit (1975–1998)	1996–2001	15,256	1975	Houston, Texas
Indiana Firebirds (2001–2004) (Albany Firebirds) (1990–2000)	Conseco Fieldhouse	2001–2004	14,400	1999	Indianapolis, Indiana
Indiana Firebirds (2001–2004) (Albany Firebirds) (1990–2000)	Pepsi Arena	1990–2000	13,256	1990	Albany, New York
Iowa Barnstormers	Wells Fargo Arena	2010–2014	15,181	2005	Des Moines, Iowa
Jacksonville Sharks	Jacksonville Veterans Memorial Arena	2010–2016	13,000	2003	Jacksonville, Florida
Kansas City Command (2011–2012) (Kansas City Brigade) (2006–2008)	Sprint Center	2008–2012	17,752	2007	Kansas City, Missouri
Kansas City Command (2011–2012) (Kansas City Brigade) (2006–2008)	Kemper Arena	2006–2007	17,642	1974	Kansas City, Missouri
Las Vegas Outlaws	Thomas & Mack Center	2015	16,606	1983	Paradise, Nevada
Los Angeles Avengers	Staples Center	2000–2008	16,096	1999	Los Angeles
Los Angeles Cobras (1988)	Los Angeles Sports Arena	1988	14,546	1959	Los Angeles
Los Angeles Kiss	Honda Center	2014–2016	17,174	1993	Anaheim, California
Massachusetts Marauders (1994) (Detroit Drive) (1988–1993)	Worcester's Centrum Centre; DCU Center (2004–present); Worcester Centrum (1987–1992)	1994	12,230	1982	Worcester, Massachusetts
Massachusetts Marauders (1994) (Detroit Drive) (1988–1993)	Joe Louis Arena	1988–1993	20,066	1979	Detroit, Michigan
Miami Vise (1987 Playtest Game)	N/A	1987	N/A	N/A	N/A
Milwaukee Mustangs (1994–2001)	Bradley Center	1994–2001	17,800	1988	Milwaukee, Wisconsin
Milwaukee Mustangs (2011–2012) (Milwaukee Iron) (2009–2010)	BMO Harris Bradley Center; Bradley Center (1988–2012)	2010–2012	17,800	1988	Milwaukee, Wisconsin
Minnesota Fighting Pike (1996)	Target Center	1996	17,500	1990	Minneapolis, Minnesota
Nashville Kats	Sommet Center; Nashville Arena (1996–1999), (2007); Gaylord Entertainment Center (1999–2007)	1997–2001, 2005–2007	16,121	1996	Nashville, Tennessee
New England Steamrollers (1988)	Providence Civic Center; Dunkin' Donuts Center (2001–present)	1988	11,500	1972	Providence, Rhode Island
New Orleans Night (1991–1992)	Louisiana Superdome	1991–1992	55,675	1975	New Orleans, Louisiana
New Orleans VooDoo	Smoothie King Center; New Orleans Arena (1999–2014)	2004–2005, 2007–2008, 2011–2015	16,377	1999	New Orleans, Louisiana
New York Dragons (Iowa Barnstormers)	Nassau Veterans Memorial Coliseum	2001–2008	11,950	1972	Uniondale, New York
New York Dragons (Iowa Barnstormers)	Iowa Veterans Memorial Auditorium	1995–2000	11,411	1955	Des Moines, Iowa
New York Knights (1988)	Madison Square Garden	1988	18,200	1968	New York City
Oklahoma City Yard Dawgz	Cox Convention Center	2010	13,231	1972	Oklahoma City, Oklahoma
Oklahoma Wranglers (2000–2001) (Portland Forest Dragons) (1997–1999) (Memphis Pharaohs) (1995–1996)	Cox Convention Center	2000–2001	13,231	UNK	Oklahoma City, Oklahoma
Oklahoma Wranglers (2000–2001) (Portland Forest Dragons) (1997–1999) (Memphis Pharaohs) (1995–1996)	Rose Garden	1997–1999	17,544	1993	Portland, Oregon
Oklahoma Wranglers (2000–2001) (Portland Forest Dragons) (1997–1999) (Memphis Pharaohs) (1995–1996)	Pyramid Arena	1995–1996	21,000	1991	Memphis, Tennessee
Orlando Predators
Orlando Predators	Amway Center	2011–2013, 2015–2016	17,200	2010	Orlando, Florida
Orlando Predators	CFE Arena	2014	9,465	2007	Orlando, Florida
Orlando Predators	Amway Arena; The Arena in Orlando (2006); TD Waterhouse Centre (1999–2006); Orlando Arena (1989–1999)	1991–2008	15,924	1989	Orlando, Florida
Philadelphia Soul	Wells Fargo Center; Wachovia Center (2003–2010); First Union Center (1998–2003); CoreStates Center (1996–1998)	2004–2019	17,486	1996	Philadelphia, Pennsylvania
Philadelphia Soul	Wachovia Spectrum	2004–2008 (For Saturday home games)	17,380	1967	Philadelphia, Pennsylvania
Pittsburgh Gladiators	Pittsburgh Civic Arena	1987-1990	N/A	1961	Pittsburgh, Pennsylvania
Pittsburgh Power	Consol Energy Center	2011–2014	18,000	2010	Pittsburgh, Pennsylvania
Portland Steel (Portland Thunder)	Moda Center	2014–2016	20,636	1995	Portland, Oregon
Rockford Metros (1986 Playtest Game)	Rockford MetroCentre	1986	10,000	1981	Rockford, Illinois
San Antonio Force (1992)	HemisFair Arena	1992	10,146	UNK	San Antonio, Texas
San Antonio Talons (Tulsa Talons)	Alamodome	2012–2014	65,000	1993	San Antonio, Texas
San Antonio Talons (Tulsa Talons)	BOK Center	2010–2011	16,582	2008	Tulsa, Oklahoma
San Antonio Talons (Tulsa Talons)	Tulsa Convention Center	2000–2009	7,111	1964	Tulsa, Oklahoma
San Jose SaberCats	SAP Center at San Jose; HP Pavilion at San Jose (2002–2013); Compaq Center at San Jose (2001–2002); San Jose Arena (1993–2001)	1995–2015	16,100	1993	San Jose, California
Spokane Shock	Spokane Veterans Memorial Arena	2010–2015	10,471	1995	Spokane, Washington
St. Louis Stampede (1995–1996)	Kiel Center; Scottrade Center (2006–present); Savvis Center (2000–2006)	1995–1996	19,022	1994	St. Louis, Missouri
Tampa Bay Storm (Pittsburgh Gladiators)	Amalie Arena; Tampa Bay Times Forum (2011–2014); St. Pete Times Forum (2002–2011); Ice Palace (1996–2002)	1997–2017	19,200	1996	Tampa, Florida
Tampa Bay Storm (Pittsburgh Gladiators)	Tropicana Field; Thunderdome (1993–1996); Florida Suncoast Dome (1990–1993)	1991–1996	43,500	1990	St. Petersburg, Florida
Tampa Bay Storm (Pittsburgh Gladiators)	Mellon Arena	1987–1990	15,924	1961	Pittsburgh, Pennsylvania
Toronto Phantoms (2001–2002) (New England Seawolves) (1999–2000) (New York CityHawks) (1997–1998)	Air Canada Centre	2001–2002	18,819	1999	Toronto
Toronto Phantoms (2001–2002) (New England Seawolves) (1999–2000) (New York CityHawks) (1997–1998)	Hartford Civic Center	1999–2000	15,635	1980	Hartford, Connecticut
Toronto Phantoms (2001–2002) (New England Seawolves) (1999–2000) (New York CityHawks) (1997–1998)	Madison Square Garden	1997–1998	18,200	1968	New York City
Utah Blaze (2006–2013)	EnergySolutions Arena; Delta Center (1991–2006)	2006–2008, 2011–2013	14,000	1991	Salt Lake City, Utah
Utah Blaze (2006–2013)	Maverik Center; E Center (1997–2010)	2010	10,100	1997	West Valley City, Utah
Washington Commandos (1987, 1990) (Maryland Commandos) (1989)	Patriot Center	1990	10,000	1958	Fairfax, Virginia
Washington Commandos (1987, 1990) (Maryland Commandos) (1989)	Capital Centre; US Airways Arena (1993–1997)	1987, 1989	18,130	1973	Landover, Maryland
Washington Valor	Capital One Arena; Verizon Center (2017)	2017–2019	18,506	1997	Washington, D.C.
