= Randall Boe =

American lawyer

Randall Boe (born 1962) is the former General Counsel for AOL and has been involved in several cases regarding internet law. He was named the commissioner of the Arena Football League in March 2018.

== Biography ==
=== Early life ===
Boe was born in Ohio and grew up in Iowa City, Iowa. He attended the University of Wisconsin–Madison and graduated in 1983 with majors in political science and economics. He graduated from the University of Pennsylvania Law School in 1987. After graduation, he worked at Arent, Fox, Kintner, Plotkin & Kahn in Washington, D.C.

=== Legal career ===
In 1995, Boe represented Joe Shea, the publisher of the American Reporter, in a challenge to the recently passed Communications Decency Act (CDA) over concerns that the Act made it illegal to publish, distribute or disseminate "indecent" material on the Internet. Boe was the lead counsel in Shea v. Reno, filed in federal court in New York at about the same time as the ACLU filed their challenge to the same statute in Philadelphia. A three judge panel, led by Judge José A. Cabranes, unanimously ruled in July 1996 that the Communications Decency Act was unconstitutionally vague and overbroad and enjoined its enforcement. The government appealed the decisions in both Shea v. Reno and ACLU v. Reno. Ultimately, the Supreme Court affirmed the judgements in both cases.

Boe then joined America Online's legal department. He led AOL's defense in Zeran v. America Online, Inc., the first time the immunity provisions of Section 230 of the Communications Decency Act were invoked. He also participated in Sidney Blumenthal's defamation lawsuit against AOL and Matt Drudge and Doe v. AOL. Boe was also involved in lawsuits regarding junk e-mail. Under his direction, AOL began filing a series of civil lawsuits to collect damages from spammers. Boe testified before Congress on the issue and contributed to Virginia's Anti-Spam law, as well as the Federal CAN-SPAM Act of 2003.

Boe was a part of the legal team on the "AOL Access Crisis of 1996 and 1997", leading to settlements with State Attorneys General over marketing practices. After the AOL-Time Warner merger closed in 2001, Boe was named AOL's General Counsel. In 2001, on behalf of Netscape, Boe filed an antitrust lawsuit against Microsoft. Microsoft paid $750 million to settle the lawsuit. In 2006, Boe joined a task force in response to the AOL search data scandal to investigate the matter and provide recommendations on improving AOL privacy policies. In October 2006, Boe became Executive Vice President for Consumer Advocacy at AOL and stepped down as General Counsel of the company.

=== Arena Football League ===
Boe was named commissioner of the Arena Football League in 2018 after Scott Butera left the office that March. There were four active teams in the 2018 Arena Football League season. The league shut down after the 2019 season.
