= USFL standings =

The following are the United States Football League standings, running from the league's 1983 founding through its 1985 closure. Team names shown in the standings reflect the teams' most recent names, as some changed cities during their existence.

Team	Games	Wins	Losses	Ties	Win Pct.	Playoff berths	Division titles	Postseason record	USFL title game record
Philadelphia / Baltimore Stars	62	48	13	1	.774	3	2	7–1	2–1
Birmingham Stallions	58	38	20	0	.655	2	2	2–2	0–0
Tampa Bay Bandits	56	35	21	0	.625	2	0	0-2	0–0
Michigan Panthers	39	24	15	0	.615	2	1	2–1	1–0
Houston Gamblers	38	23	15	0	.605	2	1	0–2	0–0
New Jersey Generals	56	31	25	0	.554	2	0	0–2	0–0
Oakland Invaders	58	31	26	1	.534	2	2	2–2	0–1
Memphis Showboats	38	19	19	0	.500	1	0	1–1	0–0
Denver Gold	55	27	28	0	.491	1	0	0–1	0–0
Boston / New Orleans / Portland Breakers	54	25	29	0	.463	0	0	0–0	0–0
Chicago Blitz	37	17	20	0	.459	1	0	0–2	0–0
Jacksonville Bulls	36	15	21	0	.416	0	0	0–0	0–0
Los Angeles Express	56	22	34	0	.410	1	1	1–1	0–0
Arizona Wranglers	39	16	23	0	.393	1	0	2–1	0–1
Oklahoma / Arizona Outlaws	36	14	22	0	.388	0	0	0–0	0–0
San Antonio Gunslingers	36	12	24	0	.333	0	0	0–0	0–0
Washington Federals / Orlando Renegades	54	12	42	0	.222	0	0	0–0	0–0
Pittsburgh Maulers	18	3	15	0	.166	0	0	0–0	0–0

== See also ==
- United States Football League
