= Arena Football '95 =

- Limited Jaguar Sector II Edition copy
- Developer: V-Real Interactive
- Publishers: Original release: NA/EU: Atari Corporation; Relaunch: WW: B&C Computervisions, Jaguar Sector II
- Producer: Ted Keenan
- Designer: Jerry Trice
- Programmers: Brian A. Rice; David Pochron
- Platform: Atari Jaguar
- Release: Original release: NA/EU: Cancelled; Relaunch: WW: 15 July 2006
- Genre: Sports
- Modes: Single-player, multiplayer

Arena Football '95 is an unreleased arena football video game that was in development by V-Real Interactive and planned to be published by Atari Corporation on a scheduled August 1995 release exclusively for the Atari Jaguar. If it had been released before Midway Games' Kurt Warner's Arena Football Unleashed, it would have been the first officially licensed indoor american football game by the Arena Football League.

Adopting the more faster and frantic style of play from the sport compared to american football, players would have the choice of playing across any of the game modes available against with either CPU-controlled opponents or other players, while including all the rules and teams from the 1995 Arena Football League season including the Miami Hooters, who make their only game appearance in the title and were not included in Electronic Arts' Arena Football.

Originally conceived in 1993, the game was announced in early 1994 and showcased at SCES '94 but the project would be later cancelled in 1995 after various delays and expenses, despite being close to completion. Although unreleased, a playable prototype has since been released and sold online by independent groups such as the defunct Jaguar Sector II website and later B&C Computervisions.

== Gameplay ==
Gameplay screenshot from one of the released beta builds, showcasing a match between the Miami Hooters and the Albany Firebirds.

Arena Football '95 is an eight-man indoor football game that is played from a behind-the-player perspective in a three-dimensional environment with digitized sprites. In the unfinished release, most of the sports' rules are present but players cannot make extra point kicks, penalties are also not present, in addition to the lack of field goal kicks, among other missing options while the gameplay is very prone to glitches and game-crashing bugs. At the main title screen, players can jump right into a quick exhibition game, a demonstration exhibition game or manually set-up the match. Besides the already mentioned mode, the game offers both season and playoffs game modes as well. On the options menu, players can changes settings such as the camera system, timing, etc. Progress and setting changes are kept manually via the cartridge's internal EEPROM by pausing the game during a match. In addition, the game supports up to eight players with two Team Tap adapters.

Each of the teams present in the game are officially based on those from the 1995 Arena Football League season and among them are: Albany Firebirds, Arizona Rattlers, Charlotte Rage, Connecticut Coyotes, Iowa Barnstormers, Las Vegas Sting, Memphis Pharaohs, Miami Hooters, Milwaukee Mustangs, Orlando Predators, San Jose SaberCats, St. Louis Stampede and Tampa Bay Storm, with each team having their own respective colors for identification though they are altered during matches due to the game's unfinished nature, making it difficult to determine which team is which as a result. Before the start of each match, players have to choose between three types of gameplay controls: "Computer" (the default mode when controllers are not used), "Player" (which let players make the plays) or "Coach" (which let players to call the plays) and after this, a coin flipping screen is shown in order to determine which team starts the match. During gameplay, players not controlled by a CPU opponent have a yellow circle below them, which represents the home team while a red circle represents the visitor team, however, the player's circle changes from the former color to the latter by pressing C to switch between team members because of the unfinished nature of the title.

== History ==
In 1993, the Arena Football League struck a deal with V-Real Interactive to create a licensed arena football title for the recently launched Atari Jaguar. The project would be officially announced by Lou Viveros, president of Viveros & Associates and owner of V-Real in early 1994 alongside a fighting game project based on the twelve signs of zodiac for the Jaguar by Lou's latter company titled Horrorscope, which was later renamed to Zodiac Fighters. In addition, the game was available for pre-orders through the year and items such as miniature football balls branded with both the game and developer's logo respectively were also available for people who pre-ordered the title. It was showcased in a very early state at SCES '94 under the title Arena Football League. In an article on their December 1994 issue, VideoGames magazine discussed with the developers of the then-upcoming game, revealing Ted Keenan and Jerry Trice as the producer and designer of the project respectively.

After both the showcase at SCES '94 and VideoGames' December 1994 article, the game went unnoticed, though it kept being advertised as an upcoming 1995 title for the system in magazine adverts and catalogs. Besides both Arena Football '95 and Zodiac Fighters, V-Real was also working on a bowling game for the Atari Jaguar CD called Starlight Bowl-A-Rama (originally titled CD League Bowling), with the last two titles planned for a 1995 release respectively. Internal documentations from Atari Corporation listed the game in development since August 25, 1995 and it was planned for release on the same month. However, due to difficulties when programming for the system, missing deadlines and Atari Corp. discontinuing the hardware were the reasons for the project's cancellation after a year of development, despite being close to completion. The company folded shortly after the cancellation of all their upcoming Jaguar projects. Among the people involved with the game's development was Brian A. Rice, who previously worked on titles such as Lynx Casino for the Atari Lynx, among other games.

== Release ==
After Hasbro Interactive released the patents and rights to the Jaguar into public domain in 1999 by declaring it as an open platform and opening the doors for homebrew development, it allowed independent publisher and developers to release unfinished titles from the system's past life cycle. An unfinished build of Arena Football '95 would see the light of day on July 15, 2006 when the defunct Jaguar Sector II website released 35 copies of the title including box and manual for US$50. They later produced ten more copies for a total of 45. Soon after, B&C Computervisions published the game as a cartridge-only release.
