= I Love Alaska =

- Directed by: Lernert Engelberts; Sander Plug
- Produced by: Bruno Felix; Femke Wolting
- Starring: Mary C. McKitrick
- Cinematography: Misha de Ridder
- Edited by: Sander Cijsouw
- Production company: Submarine Channel
- Distributed by: Submarine Channel
- Release date: 2009
- Running time: 54 minutes
- Country: Netherlands
- Language: English

I Love Alaska is a 2009 documentary chronicling the leaked AOL search history of "user 711391," whose searches are narrated by a monotone female voiceover. The film was produced by Submarine Channel and released episodically in 2009 before being uploaded to stream for free on Minimovies.org.

== Plot ==
The documentary examines the life of middle-aged woman from Texas through the digital trail left in her leaked AOL search history. Across hundreds of queries spanning several months, the viewer observers her attempts to navigate personal dissatisfaction, seek guidance on improving her intimate and emotional life, and grapple with feelings of loneliness and uncertainty. Her searches gradually reveal a growing fixation on Alaska-its landscapes, culture, and the possibility of starting over there-which becomes a symbolic destination representing escape, reinvention, and a life beyond her current circumstances. Through this accumulation of mundane, venerable, and sometimes poignant queries, the film constructs and indirect portrait of an ordinary person using the internet as a space for confession, curiosity and imagined transformation.

== Structure ==
The film is broken into 13 episodes, each running between 3 and 6 minutes long. A voiceover reads aloud the searches of user 711391 in chronological order, indicated by a timestamp at the bottom of the screen. Each episode is accompanied by a steady shot of Alaska (e.g., a mountain range, a log cabin, a highway).
