= List of defunct American and Canadian professional football teams =

For the sake of simplicity, this list will only focus on national (non-regional, non-National Football League) outdoor (i.e., not arena football or leagues with similar rules) North American football teams not covered in other lists; i.e., the All-America Football Conference, the first three universally recognized as major incarnations of the American Football League, Continental Football League, World Football League, American Football Association, United States Football League, non-European teams from the World League of American Football, Canadian Football League (including predecessors and South Division teams), the 2001 XFL, and the Alliance of American Football; that played at least one game. As a general rule, only teams with existing Wikipedia articles are listed here.

See the list of defunct National Football League franchises, list of Continental Football League teams, and defunct Arena Football League teams for defunct teams in those leagues.

== A ==
- Alabama Hawks (1968)
- Akron Pros (1926)
- Arizona Hotshots (2019)
- Arizona Outlaws (1985)
- Arizona Wranglers (1983–84)
- Atlanta Legends (2019)

== B ==
- Baltimore Colts (1947-50)
- Baltimore Stallions (1994–95)
- Birmingham Americans (1974)
- Birmingham Barracudas (1995)
- Birmingham Fire (1991–92)
- Birmingham Stallions (1983–85)
- Birmingham Vulcans (1975, 1979)
- Birmingham Thunderbolts (2001)
- Birmingham Iron (2019)
- Boston Bears (1940)
- Boston Brawlers (2014)
- Boston Bulldogs (1926)
- Boston Shamrocks (1936–37)
- Boston Sweepers/New Bedford Sweepers (1962–66)
- Brooklyn Dodgers (AAFC) (1946–48)
- Buffalo Bisons, 1946; renamed Buffalo Bills (AAFC), 1947–49
- Buffalo Indians/Tigers (1940–41)

== C ==
- Charlotte Stars (1974)
- Charlotte Hornets (WFL) (1975)
- Chicago Blitz (1983–85)
- Chicago Enforcers (2001)
- Chicago Fire (1974, 1979)
- Chicago Owls (1960s)
- Chicago Rockets, 1946–48; renamed Chicago Hornets, 1949
- Chicago Winds (1975)
- Cincinnati Bengals (1937–1941)
- Columbus Bullies (1940–41)

== D ==
- Denver Gold (1983–85)
- Detroit Wheels (1974)

== E ==
- Erie Veterans (1924–50)

== F ==
- Florida Blazers (1974)
- Florida Tuskers (2009–10)

== H ==
- Hartford Colonials (2009–11)
- Hartford Knights (1968–73)
- The Hawaiians (1974–75)
- Houston Gamblers (1983–85)
- Houston Texans (1974)

== J ==
- Jacksonville Bulls (1983–85)
- Jacksonville Express (1975)
- Jacksonville Sharks (1974)

== L ==
- Las Vegas Locomotives (2009–12)
- Las Vegas Outlaws (2001)
- Las Vegas Posse (1994)
- Los Angeles Buccaneers (NFL) (1926)
- Los Angeles Bulldogs (1936–48)
- Los Angeles Dons (1946–49)
- Los Angeles Express (1983–85)
- Los Angeles Wildcats (1926–27)
- Los Angeles Xtreme (2001)

== M ==
- McKeesport Olympics (folded no earlier than 1940)
- Miami Seahawks (1946)
- Memphis Express (2019)
- Memphis Mad Dogs (1995)
- Memphis Maniax (2001)
- Memphis Showboats (1983–85)
- Memphis Southmen (1974–75)
- Michigan Panthers (1983–85)
- Milwaukee Chiefs
- Montreal Concordes (1982–87)
- Montreal Machine (1991–92)

== N ==
- New Jersey Generals (1983–85)
- New York/New Jersey Hitmen (2001)
- New York/New Jersey Knights (1991–92)
- New York Stars (1974)
- New York Yankees (AAFC),1946–48; merged with Brooklyn Dodgers, becoming Brooklyn/New York Yankees, 1949
- New York Yankees (1940 AFL)
- Norfolk Neptunes (1966–71)

== O ==
- Oakland Invaders (1983–85)
- Ohio Glory (1992)
- Omaha Mammoths (2014)
- Omaha Nighthawks (2010–12)
- Orange/Newark Tornadoes (1888-1965)
- Orlando Panthers (1966–71)
- Orlando Rage (2001)
- Orlando Thunder (1991–92)
- Orlando Renegades (1983–85)
- Orlando Apollos (2019)
- Ottawa Renegades (2002–05)
- Ottawa Rough Riders (1876-1996)

== P ==
- Philadelphia Bell (1974–75)
- Philadelphia/Baltimore Stars (1983–85)
- Pittsburgh Maulers (1983–84)
- Portland Breakers (1985)
- Portland Storm (1974)
- Portland Thunder (1975)
- Providence Steam Roller (1916–42, 1962–64)

== R ==
- Raleigh–Durham Skyhawks (1991)
- Richmond Rebels

== S ==
- Sacramento Gold Miners (1993–94)
- Sacramento Mountain Lions/California Redwoods (2009–12)
- Sacramento Surge (1991–92)
- Salt Lake Stallions (2019)
- San Antonio Gunslingers (1983–85)
- San Antonio Riders (1991–92)
- San Antonio Wings (1975)
- San Antonio Texans (1995)
- San Antonio Commanders (2019)
- San Diego Fleet (2019)
- San Francisco Demons (2001)
- Shreveport Pirates (1994–95)
- Shreveport Steamer (1975, 1978–81)
- Southern California Sun (1974–75)
- Sarnia Imperials (1928-1955)
- St. Louis Gunners (1935–39)

== T ==
- Tampa Bay Bandits (1983–85)
- Toronto Rifles (1964–67)

== V ==
- Vancouver Grizzlies (1941)
- Virginia Destroyers (2011–12)

== See also ==
- Defunct Arena Football League teams
- List of defunct National Football League franchises
