= Scott Butera =

American businessman

- Citizenship: American
- Education: Trinity College (BA); New York University (MBA)

Scott C. Butera is an American businessman and entertainment and hospitality executive who is best known for being the CEO at various casinos in the United States. He was the commissioner of the Arena Football League (AFL) from September 2014 to March 2018. Scott Butera currently serves as president and a board member for Fubo Gaming, a Chicago-based subsidiary of live TV streaming platform fuboTV Inc. (NYSE: FUBO), and developer and distributor of Fubo Sportsbook. Before joining Fubo Gaming, Butera was president of Interactive Gaming at MGM Resorts International, where he was responsible for the development and operations of sports betting and online gaming across online and traditional platforms.

== Profile ==
Butera played football at Trinity College in Hartford, Connecticut, where he graduated with a bachelor of arts degree and recently served as a member of the board of fellows, he currently serves on the board of trustees. He later earned his Master of Business Administration degree at New York University's Leonard N. Stern School of Business. His financial background includes 20 years as an investment banker at UBS Investment Bank, Credit Suisse First Boston, Smith Barney and Bear Stearns & Co. where he concentrated his efforts on analysis and client service for companies in the real estate, lodging, gaming and leisure industries. His resume includes being former president, CEO and executive vice president at Trump Entertainment Resorts, Cosmopolitan Resort and Casino in Las Vegas, CEO at Tropicana Entertainment (2008–2011) and CEO at Foxwoods Resort Casino (2011–2013). At Tropicana, he engineered the casino's emergence from Chapter 11 bankruptcy.

In September 2014, Butera was named the seventh commissioner of the Arena Football League, replacing Jerry Kurz, who took the role of president of the league. It was Butera's first involvement in the management of a sports league. His initial focus was on increasing consumer awareness of the AFL brand so that it could grow revenues through strategic partnerships and sponsor programs; he was to work closely with Kurz on football operations to maximize opportunities to integrate spectator experiences. Butera would be replaced as commissioner of the AFL in March 2018 after a severe period of league contraction during which the league declined from 14 teams to four.

Before joining Fubo Gaming, Butera served as the director of interactive gaming at MGM Resorts International. He had remained indirectly involved with professional football through a partnership with the Alliance of American Football; when the AAF collapsed during its only season, MGM Resorts retained ownership of its gambling-oriented cell phone app. In 2020, Butera served as co-CEO of Vigtory before transitioning into his current role, President of Fubo Gaming, after fuboTV acquired Vigtory in January 2021, where he helped launch Fubo Sportsbook into market in Q4 2021.

== Personal life ==
Butera and his wife, Denise Butera, have three children and live in Southern Highlands, Las Vegas, Nevada.

In 2016, Butera joined the Trinity College board of trustees. Two of his children, Allison and Christopher, currently study at his alma mater.

== See also ==
- Tropicana Entertainment
- Foxwoods Resort Casino
- Arena Football League
