= Newton Nite Hawks =

- Founded: 1974
- League: Chicagoland Football League (1974–1976); Northern States Football League (1977–1978); Midwest Football League (2019); United Championship Football League (2020) Heartland Football Association (2022–2024.) Southern Plains Football League (2025–Present.)
- Team history: Newton Nite Hawks; 1974–1978, 2019–
- Based in: Newton, Iowa
- Arena: Newton – HA Lynn Stadium
- Colors: Gold and Black
- General manager: Jim Foster
- Championships: CFL Championship (1975), European Professional Football Cup (1977)

The Newton Nite Hawks are a semi-pro American football team that played in Newton, Iowa. They were members of the Chicagoland Football League and Northern States Football League from 1974 to 1978 and returned to play from 2019–present. They now play in the Southern Plains Football League (SPFL).

They were the first professional or semi-professional team to play American football on the European continent.

== History ==
Founded by local businessmen Jim Foster and Jim Williams in 1974, The team roots can be traced back to the Des Moines Vikings, a semi-pro football team that operated until 1973. The Newton Nite Hawks were coached by Tom Ross during their first season and consisted of several players from the after-mentioned Vikings and played in the Chicagoland Football League (CFL) . The team earned their first ever franchise victory by defeating the Brighton Park Bengals 48–0. After a slow start, the Nite Hawks went on to win 4 of their last 5 games and earned a spot in the CFL playoffs. They were the first team in CFL history to make the playoffs in their first year of operation. The Nite Hawks finished their inaugural season 5–5–1.

The 1975 season was a breakout year for the Nite Hawks. Jim Williams took over the head coaching duties as the team finished 10–2, won the American Division Title and captured the CFL championship with a 17–7 win over the Niles Saints. Statistically, the Nite Hawks led the league many categories, including total offense and total defense.

In their third year of existence, the 1976 Nite Hawks made the league playoffs for the third consecutive year under new coach Dick Altemeier. The team finished the season 6–5 after a loss to the Delavan (Wisconsin) Red Devils in the first round of the CFL playoffs.

The Newton Nite Hawks made football history in 1977. Through the entrepreneurial efforts of Jim Foster, the Newton Nite Hawks were chosen to play a 5-game football tour in Europe (see below) with the Chicago Lions in early June. Additionally, the Nite Hawks became a member of the Northern States Football League. In their final year in Newton, the team finished 5–5 in 1978 under coach Herb Taylor. After winning all 5 games in Europe, the Nite Hawks posted a 7–3 record in the 1977 NSFL regular season. They played all home games at H. A. Lynn Field after three previous seasons at Holland Patterson Field.

=== European Championship ===
In an effort to establish and promote American football in Europe, the Nite Hawks were the first professional team (pro or semi-pro) at any level to play American football on the European continent, as the team and league rival Chicago Lions played a 5 game tour in 3 countries during June, 1977. Organized by the Intercontinental Football League (unrelated to the Intercontinental Football League, the predecessor of NFL Europe), an organization that was founded by Bill Kapp in 1973 and staged similar tour a year earlier between two college teams – the Texas A&I Javelinas and the Henderson State Reddies.

Games were played in Versailles, France; Lille, France; Landstuhl, Germany; Gratz, Austria; and Vienna, Austria. The games in Lille and Gratz drew 21,000 and 13,000 fans respectively. The Nite Hawks swept the Lions, winning all 5 contests and the first (and only) European Professional Football Cup. The IFL attempted to schedule additional games in Linz, Austria and Bucharest, Romania, but logistics and politics proved too difficult for the contests to take place.

Nite Hawks running back Mark Fetter scored the first professional touchdown on European soil, a 6 yard run en route to a victory in Versailles, France.

=== 2019 to present ===
In 2019, two Newton entrepreneurs – Gordon Head and Mark Mackerman II – resurrected the team, after they got the approval from original owner Jim Foster, and started to play in the Midwest Football League. They went 9–1 in regular-season, winning the Southwest Division and the Western Conference titles, but lost 22–28 to Missouri Ravens in the MFL championship game.

For the 2020 season the Nite Hawks joined a merger between the MFL and the Midwest Football Alliance – The United Championship Football League (UCFL). In the inaugural UCFL season they finished with a 5–1 record and clinched the 2nd seed for playoffs, but lost to the Midwest (MO) Titans 30–8 in the Semi-Finals. In 2024, they began a rebrand to the Iowa Nite Hawks.

== Home field ==
The Nite Hawks played their home games in Newton at Holland-Patterson Memorial Field (1974–1976) and H.A. Lynn Field (1977–1978). The team often practiced at Industrial Park located in the north end of Newton.

The new team played at the Valley Stadium in West Des Moines, Iowa, after they were unable to reach to an agreement with the Newton Community School District Board of Education for the use of H.A. Lynn Stadium. 2022 season ownership has been granted permission to play all future home games at H.A. Lynn Stadium .

== Uniforms ==
The Nite Hawks wore 3 uniform tops during their 5-year history:

- 1974–75: Black with gold numerals on front/back and shoulders. The sleeves were trimmed with the words IOWA on one sleeve, and HAWKS on the other.
- 1976–77: Black with gold numerals on front/back and shoulders. Small hawk logo placed on sleeves. The word IOWA was placed above the front chest numerals.
- 1978: Black with gold numerals on front/back and shoulders. The word NITE HAWKS was placed above the front chest numerals.

Road jerseys were white with black numerals and lettering.

Pants: Gold with single black stripe on each side.

Helmets: Gold shell with black center stripe. Circular black Nite Hawk insignia decals adorn each side of the helmet. Facemasks were grey.

== Minor League Football Hall of Famers ==
Nite Hawks in the American Football Association (AFA) Minor League Pro Football Hall of Fame:

- 1982 – Jim Foster, Executive
- 1991 – Stan Allspach, Player (QB)
- 1994 – Ron Wilson, Player (WR)
- 1996 – Jim Williams, Coach
- 2003 – Doug Fisher, Player (DB)
- 2004 – David Summy, Player (LB)
- 2013 – Steve "Bucky" Denton, Player (ATH)
- 2016-Larry Allen, Player (DE)

== Notable players and alumni ==
- Jim Foster (GM, WR) – developed patent for arena football
- Bill Larson (TE) – played 3 years in NFL after finishing Nite Hawk career in 1976
- Karl Schueneman (OL) – starred with Steve McQueen in the 1980 film The Hunter
- David Beckman (Assistant) – former head coach of Hamilton Tiger-Cats of the Canadian Football League
- Lightning Mitchell (RB) – founder and director of the Women's Basketball Association
