= AOL search log release =

2006 release of search queries

In 2006, the Internet company AOL released a large excerpt from its web search query logs to the public. AOL did not identify users in the report, but personally identifiable information was present in many of the queries. This allowed some users to be identified by their search queries. Although AOL took down the file within a few days, it had already been widely copied and still remains available.

== Overview ==
On August 4, 2006, AOL Research, headed by Abdur Chowdhury, released a compressed text file on one of its websites containing twenty million search queries for over 650,000 users over a three-month period; it was intended for research. AOL deleted the file on their site by August 7, but not before it had been copied and distributed on the Internet.

AOL did not identify users in the report; however, personally identifiable information was present in many of the queries. As the queries were attributed by AOL to particular user numerically identified accounts, an individual could be identified and matched to their account and search history. The New York Times was able to locate an individual from the released and anonymized search records by cross referencing them with phonebook listings. Consequently, the ethical implications of using this data for research are under debate.

AOL acknowledged it was a mistake and removed the data; however, the removal was too late. The data was redistributed by others and can still be downloaded from mirror sites.

In January 2007, Business 2.0 Magazine on CNNMoney ranked the release of the search data as #57 of its "101 Dumbest Moments in Business" for 2007.

== Lawsuits ==
In September 2006, a class action lawsuit was filed against AOL in the U.S. District Court for the Northern District of California. The lawsuit accuses AOL of violating the Electronic Communications Privacy Act and of fraudulent and deceptive business practices, among other claims, and seeks at least $5,000 for every person whose search data was exposed. The case was settled in 2013.

== Notable users ==
Although the searchers were only identified by a numeric ID, some people's search results have become notable for various reasons.

=== Thelma Arnold ===
Through clues revealed in the search queries, The New York Times successfully uncovered the identities of several searchers. With her permission, they exposed user #4417749 as Thelma Arnold, a 62-year-old widow from Lilburn, Georgia. This privacy breach was widely reported, and led to the resignation of AOL's CTO, Maureen Govern, on August 21, 2006. The media quoted an insider as saying that two employees had been fired: the researcher who released the data, and his immediate supervisor, who reported to Govern.

=== User 927 ===
One product of the AOL scandal was the proliferation of blog entries examining the exposed data. Certain users' search logs were identified as interesting, humorous, disturbing, or dangerous.

Consumer watchdog website The Consumerist posted a blog entry by editor Ben Popken identifying the anonymous user number 927 as having an especially bizarre and macabre search history, ranging from butterfly orchids and the band Fall Out Boy, to search terms relating to child pornography and zoophilia. The blog posting has since been viewed nearly 4,000 times and referenced on a number of other high-profile sites. In addition to sparking the interest of the Internet community, User 927 inspired a theatrical production, written by Katharine Clark Gray in Philadelphia. The play, also named User 927, has since been cited on several of the same blogs that originally discovered the real user's existence.

=== User 711391 ===
A series of movies on the website Minimovies called I Love Alaska puts voice and imagery to User 711391 which the authors have labeled as "an episodic documentary".

== See also ==
- Netflix Prize
