= Jerry Kurz =

American football player (born 1949)

Personal information
- Born: June 21, 1949 (age 77); London, England

Career history
- af2 League President (2000–2009); AFL Commissioner (2010–2014)

Jerry B. Kurz (born June 21, 1949) is a founding father of the now-defunct Arena Football League (AFL). He was one of the earliest leaders of Arena football, and was part owner of Gridiron Enterprises, original owner of the proprietary, formerly patented, Arena football system.

== College ==
Kurz attended college and played football at the University of Oklahoma to earn his undergraduate degree. At Northern Illinois University he earned a Juris Doctor degree.

== Arena football ==
Kurz worked with Arena football for almost 30 years and was the second-longest tenured employee of Arena football, second only to Arena football creator Jim Foster. Under Kurz's leadership as president of af2, the league expanded into many small-to-mid-sized markets, which helped bring the Arena Football League back in 2010 after the 2009 season was canceled due to financial problems. Kurz has also worked as the league's Vice President of International Development. His main responsibility in this position was to carry out the league's H3 visa program. In this program, international players were exposed to, and played in the Arena Football League system. He oversaw international Arena Football games.

The original Arena Football League suspended operations after the 2008 postseason. Following the 2009 af2 season, which had been contested as scheduled despite the parent league's difficulties, Kurz and several af2 owners announced a plan for a new league forming, using a single entity model, called "Arena Football 1" or simply, "AF1". He stated that several former AFL teams and current af2 teams were in negotiations with the new league. The new league was to include former AFL and the [at that time] current Af2 teams.

In December 2009, the original AFL filed for Chapter 7 bankruptcy. The AF1 team owners had bought all assets of the former AFL for $6.1 million; this included all logos, trophies, field turf, dasher boards, and team names.

Kurz announced at the end of 2009 that the AF1 would use the AFL name to re-brand the product. It was then discovered that the AF1 name was used as a business group to acquire all assets to once again use the AFL name and assets legally.

With lack of small market teams committing to the af2 for the 2010 season, the af2 ceased operations, initially leaving open the possibility of restarting in 2012. (Since that time, there has been a proliferation of smaller leagues playing indoor gridiron football, but no revival of af2 itself.)

Kurz is a member of the Arena Football Hall of Fame, and was inducted into the American Football Association's Hall of Fame and the Semi-Pro Football Hall of Fame in 1991.

Kurz sued the former league for "diversity breach of contract." His lawsuit was dismissed in August 2018; the league would shut down in November 2019. In 2017 Kurz joined the rival Indoor Football League as Financial Officer. He was the winning bidder for the non-liquid assets of the Alliance of American Football following that league's bankruptcy auction in July 2019.

As of 2023, Kurz was with Fan Controlled Football and seeking individual buyers for the league's eight teams in hopes of reviving the dormant league.

On June 4, 2024, Kurz was announced as general counsel and senior advisor of player operations of the revived Arena Football League, having been co-founding partner and former commissioner of the original AFL. When the remaining teams left the AFL to create Arena Football One at the end of the 2024 season, Kurz was retained and promoted to chief executive officer.

== Personal life ==
Kurz and his wife Kathryn, both being licensed attorneys, operated their own law firm for 20 years together. Together the two have a son named Matthew Hall Kurz, who was a walk-on, who later earned a full athletic scholarship to the Indiana University football team from 2005–2010.
