= Arena Football (1988 video game) =

- Gameplay between Chicago and Detroit
- Developer: Chris R. Bickford III
- Publisher: C159 Production
- Designer: Chris R. Bickford III
- Platform: Commodore 64
- Release: 1988; 1993
- Genre: American football
- Modes: Single-player, multiplayer

Arena Football is a 1988 Commodore 64 video game written by Chris R. Bickford III. It is the first Arena or Indoor Football game. It is a text-based simulation that allows the user to pick a play for their team (on defense or offense) and the computer simulates the results of the play based on real-life data and tendencies of the actual team.

== Gameplay ==
The game includes all six teams in the AFL at the time: Chicago, Pittsburgh, Detroit, Los Angeles, New England, and New York Knights.

== Legacy ==
In 1993, Arena Football was re-programmed and added 8 more teams to the original six including; Maryland, Denver, Tampa Bay, New Orleans, Albany, Orlando, Dallas, and Columbus. It is to this day, the only Arena Football game to include the Maryland Commandos.
