= Arena Football: Road to Glory =

2007 video game

- Arena Football: Road to Glory cover art
- Developers: EA Tiburon; Budcat Creations
- Publisher: Electronic Arts
- Platform: PlayStation 2
- Release: NA: February 22, 2007
- Genre: Sports
- Modes: Single-player, multiplayer

Arena Football: Road to Glory is a PlayStation 2 video game developed by Electronic Arts (under their EA Sports brand). It was released on February 22, 2007, and was the follow-up to their first Arena Football video game. The cover features fullback/linebacker Bob McMillen, from ArenaBowl XX's champion team, the Chicago Rush. The game includes all the rules, rosters, and teams for the AFL season. For the first time the Arena Football minor league, af2, is included in the series.

== Reception ==
Reception

Aggregate score
Aggregator	Score
Metacritic	62/100

Review scores
Publication	Score
1Up.com	D+
Game Informer	6.5/10
GameSpot	6.2/10
GameSpy	3/5
GamesRadar+	6.0/10
GameZone	7.2/10
IGN	6.5/10
PlayStation: The Official Magazine	6.5/10

Arena Football: Road to Glory scored a 62/100 on Metacritic, indicating "mixed or average reviews". Jeff Haynes from IGN gave the game a 6.5 saying "Road to Glory is more like a Path to Repetition. The most important omission is perhaps the rejection of this season's Elway Rule, which would do away with the Ironman football and allow for substitution at any point in the game. But rules aside, it's apparent when you pick up this game that there hasn't really been a lot done to change it from last year's title. The same visual bugs are there, the same bland sound is there, and even with the addition of AF2 teams, you're still getting an extremely shallow football experience."
