= Arena Football (2006 video game) =

2006 EA video game

- Developer: EA Tiburon
- Publisher: EA Sports
- Platforms: PlayStation 2 Xbox
- Release: NA: February 7, 2006
- Genre: Sports
- Modes: Single-player multiplayer

Arena Football is an Arena Football League video game developed by Electronic Arts (under their EA Sports brand) for the PlayStation 2 and Xbox. It was released on February 7, 2006. The cover features quarterback John Dutton of the Colorado Crush, the champions of ArenaBowl XIX. The game is similar to EA's other simulation football games (NCAA Football and Madden NFL), but adopts a style of play that is similar to the faster and more frantic paced Arena game. The game includes all the rules, rosters, and teams for the 2006 AFL season. A sequel, Arena Football: Road to Glory was made the following year for the PS2 only.

Arena Football features online multiplayer. The online servers were shut down on September 1, 2007

== Teams ==
=== 2006 AFL teams ===
All of the teams that competed in the 2006 season are included. The New Orleans VooDoo were excluded because they had temporarily halted operations that year due to Hurricane Katrina. However, their logo is available for use in the game's create-a-team feature as well as their stadium, the New Orleans Arena if, in the create a team option, the player creates a team called the New Orleans VooDoo. The VooDoo resumed operations in 2007. The Kansas City Brigade franchise and its colors have been included, but the official name and logo didn't make it in because they were unveiled after the game had gone into production so the team was known as the Kansas City KC in the video game.

=== Historic teams ===
EA included a number of historic teams in Arena Football. They are awarded to the player upon meeting certain statistical goals in a game.

== Reception ==
The game received average reviews. IGN gave the game an 8.3, stating, "While the season mode is shallow, online play and solid multiplayer action will keep you bouncing off the walls for some time." GameSpot gave the game a lower score of 6.9, and like IGN, criticized Season Mode. While GameSpot praised the Telemetry system, they also commented that the game cannot "decide whether it wants to be arcade- or simulation-oriented."
