= Chicago Politicians =

American arena football team

- Founded: 1986
- League: Arena Football League
- Team history: Chicago Politicians (1986)
- Based in: Chicago, Illinois

The Chicago Politicians were a team formed in 1986 by Arena Football League founder Jim Foster to play an initial "test game" in Rockford, Illinois, at the MetroCentre. They were defeated by the Rockford Metros, 30–18. The test was deemed successful, as a four-team "demonstration season" was held the next year, and arena football has been played every year since, although the original Arena Football League itself ceased operations after its 2008 season, and the current organization of that name bought the rights to it in bankruptcy proceedings. Some Politicians players went on to play for the Chicago Bruisers and the other charter AFL teams, the Denver Dynamite, Pittsburgh Gladiators, and Washington Commandos.
