= Rockford Metros =

Arena football test-game team

The Rockford Metros were an arena football team assembled for a test game at the Rockford MetroCentre in Rockford, Illinois, in April 1986. The Metros played the Chicago Politicians in an early trial of the game that became the Arena Football League (AFL).

== History ==
AFL commissioner Jim Foster staged the experimental contest. It drew more than 1,500 spectators, was conducted with a $4,000 budget, and only its first half was played. After the test was deemed successful, a second test game was held in Chicago before the AFL staged its first official game in 1987.
