= Arena Football League =

Professional American football league

- Most recent season or competition: 2019 Arena Football League season
- The first logo of the league, used for the first 16 seasons.
- Formerly: Arena Football 1 (2010); NET 10 Wireless AFL (2012–2014)
- Sport: Arena football
- Founded: 1986; 40 years ago
- Founder: Jim Foster
- First season: 1987
- Folded: 2019; 7 years ago
- President: Ron Jaworski
- Commissioner: Randall Boe
- Country: United States
- Headquarters: Philadelphia, Pennsylvania
- Last champion: Albany Empire (1st title) (2019)
- Most titles: Tampa Bay Storm and Arizona Rattlers (5 titles)
- Broadcasters: AFL Now; CBS Sports Network; ESPN 2 Monumental Sports Network
- Related competitions: CIF, IFL, NAL

The Arena Football League (AFL) was a professional arena football league in the United States. It was founded in 1986, but played its first official games in the 1987 season, making it the third longest-running professional football league in North America after the Canadian Football League (CFL) and the National Football League (NFL) until the AFL closed in 2019.

The AFL played a formerly proprietary code known as arena football, a form of American football played indoors on a 66-by-28 yard field (about a quarter of the surface area of an NFL field), with rules encouraging offensive performance, resulting in a typically faster-paced and higher-scoring game compared to NFL games. The sport was invented in the early 1980s and patented by Jim Foster, a former executive of the United States Football League (USFL) and the NFL. Each of the league's 32 seasons culminated in the ArenaBowl, with the winner being crowned the league's champion for that season.

From 2000 to 2009, the AFL had its own developmental league, the AF2. The AFL played 22 seasons from 1987 to 2008; internal issues caused the league to cancel its 2009 season, though the af2 did play. Later that year both the AFL and af2 were dissolved and reorganized as a new corporation comprising teams from both leagues, and the AFL returned in 2010. The league's average game attendance after returning in 2010 was approximately 9,500.

The league historically had a nationwide footprint, and was recognized as the most prominent professional indoor football league in North America, offering higher payment, more widespread media exposure, and a longer history than competing leagues. From a high of 19 teams in 2007, the league contracted to a low of four teams in 2018, all in the northeastern United States. There were six teams playing in 2019, the league's final season.

On October 29, 2019, league commissioner Randall Boe confirmed reports that the league had discontinued operating teams in local markets for the 2020 season. Four weeks later on November 27, league commissioner Boe announced via Twitter that the league as a whole had filed for Chapter 7 bankruptcy, dissolving the league for the second time.

== History ==
=== Creation ===
Jim Foster, a promotions manager with the National Football League, conceived of indoor football while watching an indoor soccer match at Madison Square Garden in 1981. While at the game, he wrote his idea on a 9 x 12 envelope, with sketches of the field and notes on gameplay. He presented the idea to a few friends at the NFL offices, where he received praise and encouragement for his concept. After solidifying the rules and a business plan, and supplemented with sketches by a professional artist, Foster presented his idea to various television networks. He reached an agreement with NBC for a "test game".

Plans for arena football were put on hold in 1982 as the United States Football League was launched. Foster left the NFL to accept a position in the USFL. He eventually became executive vice-president with the Chicago Blitz, where he returned to his concept of arena football. In 1983, he began organizing the test game in his spare time from his job with the Blitz. By 1985, the USFL had ceased football operations and he began devoting all his time to arena football, and on April 27, 1986, his concept was realized when the test game was played.

=== Test games ===
The test game was played in Rockford, Illinois, on April 27, 1986, at the Rockford MetroCentre. Sponsors were secured, and players and coaches from local colleges were recruited to volunteer to play for the teams, the Chicago Politicians and Rockford Metros, with the guarantee of a tryout should the league take off. Interest was high enough following the initial test game that Foster decided to put on a second, "showcase" game. The second game was held on February 27, 1987, at the Rosemont Horizon in Chicago with a budget of $20,000, quintuple the $4,000 for the test game. Foster also invited ESPN to send a film crew to the game; a highlights package aired on SportsCenter.

=== Inaugural season ===
Following the successes of his trial-run games, Foster moved ahead with his idea for arena football. He founded the Arena Football League with four teams: the Pittsburgh Gladiators, Denver Dynamite, Washington Commandos, and Chicago Bruisers. Foster appointed legendary Darrel "Mouse" Davis, godfather of the "run and shoot" and modern pro offenses, as executive director of football operations. Davis hired the original coaches and was the architect of the league's original wide-open offensive playbooks.

The first game in Arena Football League history was played on June 19, 1987, between the Gladiators and Commandos at Pittsburgh Civic Arena in front of 12,117 fans. The game was deliberately not televised so that it could be analyzed and any follies and failures would not be subject to national public scrutiny. Following the inaugural game, tweaks and adjustments were made, and the first season continued. The Dynamite and Bruisers played in the first-ever televised AFL game the next night, on June 20, 1987, at the Rosemont Horizon in suburban Chicago on ESPN with Bob Rathbun and Lee Corso calling the play-by-play. The broadcast showed a short clip of the Commandos-Gladiators game. Each team played six games, two against each other team. The top two teams, Denver and Pittsburgh, then competed in the first-ever AFL championship game, ArenaBowl I.

On September 30, 1987, Foster filed an application with the United States Patent and Trademark Office to patent his invented sport. The patent application covered the rules of the game, specifically detailing the goalposts and rebound netting and their impact on gameplay. Foster's application was granted on March 27, 1990. The patent expired on March 27, 2007.

=== Early years (1987–1999) ===
From its inception, the AFL operated in a state of semi-obscurity; many Americans had heard the term "arena football" but knew little to nothing about the league itself.

From the 1987 season until the late 1990s, the most exposure the league would receive was on ESPN, which aired tape-delayed games, often well after midnight, and often edited to match the allotted time slot. The league received its first taste of wide exposure in 1998, when Arena Bowl XII was televised nationally as part of ABC's old Wide World of Sports.

On July 23, 1989, much of America learned of the AFL for an unintended reason, when the Pittsburgh Gladiators' head coach, Joe Haering, made football history by punching commissioner Jim Foster during a game with the Chicago Bruisers. The national media ran with the story, including a photo in USA Today. The game was played between the two teams in Sacramento's ARCO Arena, as part of the AFL's 'Barnstorming America' tour. Foster had walked onto the field of play to mediate an altercation between the two teams when Haering, a former NFL assistant, punched him in the jaw. Haering was suspended without pay.

One of the league's early success stories was the Detroit Drive. A primary team for some of the AFL's most highly regarded players, including George LaFrance and Gary and Alvin Rettig, as well as being a second career chance for quarterback Art Schlichter, the Drive regularly played before sold-out crowds at Joe Louis Arena, and went to the ArenaBowl every year of their existence (1988–1993). The AFL's first dynasty came to an end when their owner, Mike Ilitch (who also owned Little Caesars Pizza and the Detroit Red Wings) bought the Detroit Tigers and sold the AFL team.

Although the Drive moved to Massachusetts, becoming the Massachusetts Marauders for the 1994 season, the AFL had a number of other teams which it considered "dynasties" between 1994 and 2016. The most successful of these were the Tampa Bay Storm and their arch-rival the Orlando Predators, as well as the San Jose SaberCats and their rivals, the Arizona Rattlers. Among those four teams, they won 14 of 22 ArenaBowls in that time span and appeared in all but two.

In 1993, the league staged its first All-Star Game in Des Moines, Iowa, the future home of the long-running Iowa Barnstormers, as a fundraiser for flood victims in the area. The National Conference defeated the American Conference 64–40 in front of a crowd of 7,189. The second All-Star event was in October 2013, with two games, the first in Honolulu, Hawai'i, the second being in Beijing, China.

While some teams have enjoyed considerable on-field and even financial success, many teams in the history of the league have enjoyed little success either on or off of the field of play. There were a number of franchises which existed in the form of a series of largely-unrelated teams with little to no continuity of either coaching staffs or players under numerous management groups until they folded. One example of several which could be cited is the New York CityHawks, whose owners transferred the team from New York City to Hartford to become the New England Sea Wolves after two seasons, then after another two seasons were sold and became the Toronto Phantoms, which lasted another two seasons until folding. There are a number of reasons why these teams failed, including financially weak ownership groups, lack of deep financial support from some owners otherwise capable of providing it, lack of media exposure, and the host city's evident lack of interest in its team or the sport as a whole.

=== The new millennium (2000–2008) ===
The year 2000 brought heightened interest in the AFL. Then-St. Louis Rams quarterback Kurt Warner, who was MVP of Super Bowl XXXIV, was first noticed because he played quarterback for the AFL's Iowa Barnstormers. While many sports commentators and fans continued to ridicule the league, Warner's story gave the league positive exposure, and it brought the league a new television deal with TNN, which, unlike ESPN, televised regular season games live. While it was not financially lucrative, it helped set the stage for what the league would become in the new millennium. The year also brought a spin-off league, the af2, intended to be a developmental league, comparable to the National Football League's NFL Europe. There was a lot of expansion in the 2000s. Expansion teams included the Austin Wranglers, Carolina Cobras, Los Angeles Avengers, Chicago Rush, Detroit Fury, Dallas Desperados, Colorado Crush, New Orleans VooDoo, Philadelphia Soul, Nashville Kats, Kansas City Brigade, New York Dragons and Utah Blaze. Some of these teams, including the Crush, Desperados, Kats, and VooDoo, were owned for at least part of their existence by the same group which owned the NFL teams in their host cities, after NFL resolution to allow league owners to own the individual AFL clubs. Also, on February 8, 1999, the NFL purchased, but never exercised, an option to buy a major interest in the AFL (49.9%). Of all of these teams, only the Philadelphia Soul were still playing in the AFL in their last season before folding.

The league's second logo, used from 2003 to 2018

In 2003, the season expanded to 16 games. There were also several rule changes in this period. In 2005, players were no longer allowed to run out of bounds. The only way for a player to go out of bounds presently is if he is tackled into or deliberately contacts the side boards. This was also the first year the ArenaBowl was played at a neutral site. In 2007, free substitution was allowed, ending the "iron man" era of one-platoon football; also, games ending in ties were abolished. The next season, in 2008, the "jack" linebacker was allowed to go sideboard to sideboard without being penalized for "illegal defense".

=== Decline (2008–2009) ===
After 12 years as commissioner of the AFL, David Baker retired unexpectedly on July 25, 2008, just two days before ArenaBowl XXII; deputy commissioner Ed Policy was named interim commissioner until Baker's replacement was found. Baker explained, "When I took over as commissioner, I thought it would be for one year. It turned into 12. But now it's time."

In October 2008, Tom Benson announced that the New Orleans VooDoo were ceasing operations and folding "based on circumstances currently affecting the league and the team". Shortly thereafter, an article in Sports Business Journal announced that the AFL had a tentative agreement to sell a $100 million stake in the league to Platinum Equity; in exchange, Platinum Equity would create a centralized, single-entity business model that would streamline league and team operations and allow the league to be more profitable. Benson's move to shut down the VooDoo came during the Platinum Equity conference call, leading to speculation that he had folded because of the deal.

Because of the sudden loss of the New Orleans franchise, the league announced in October that the beginning of the free agency period would be delayed in order to accommodate a dispersal draft. Dates were eventually announced as December 2 for the dispersal draft and December 4 for free agency, but shortly before the draft the league issued a press release announcing the draft had been postponed one day to December 3. Shortly thereafter, another press release announced that the draft would be held on December 9 and free agency would commence on December 11. However, the draft still never took place, and instead another press release was issued stating that both the draft and free agency had been postponed indefinitely. Rumors began circulating that the league was in trouble and on the verge of folding, but owners denied those claims. It was soon revealed the players' union had agreed to cut the salary cap for the 2009 season to prevent a total cessation of operations. However, the announced Platinum Equity investment never materialized.

=== Canceled 2009 season/first bankruptcy ===
Although the af2 played its tenth season in 2009, a conference call in December 2008 resulted in enough votes from owners and cooperation from the AFLPA for the AFL to suspend the entire 2009 season in order to create "a long-term plan to improve its economic model." In doing so, the AFL became the second sports league to cancel an entire season, after the National Hockey League cancelled the 2004–05 season because of a lockout. The AFL also became the third sports league to lose its postseason (the first being Major League Baseball, which lost its postseason in 1994 because of a strike). Efforts to reformat the league's business model were placed under the leadership of Columbus Destroyers owner Jim Renacci and interim commissioner Policy.

High hopes for the AFL waned when interim commissioner Ed Policy announced his resignation, citing the obsolescence of his position in the reformatted league. Two weeks later, the Los Angeles Avengers announced that they were formally folding the franchise. One month later, the league missed the deadline to formally ratify the new collective bargaining agreement and announced that it was eliminating health insurance for the players. Progress on the return stalled, and no announcements were made regarding the future of the league.

On July 20, 2009, Sports Business Journal reported that the AFL owed approximately $14 million to its creditors and was considering filing for Chapter 11 bankruptcy protection. In early August 2009, numerous media outlets began reporting that the AFL was folding permanently and would file for Chapter 7 bankruptcy. The league released a statement on August 4 to the effect that while the league was not folding, it was suspending league operations indefinitely. Despite this, several of the league's creditors filed papers to force a Chapter 7 liquidation if the league did not do so voluntarily. This request was granted on August 7, though converted to a Chapter 11 reorganization on August 26.

=== Relaunch and rock star owners (2010–2014) ===
Following the suspension of the AFL's 2009 season, league officials and owners of af2 (which had played its season as scheduled) began discussing the future of arena football and the two leagues. With its 50.1 percent ownership of af2, the AFL's bankruptcy and dissolution prompted the dissolution of af2 as well. That league was formally considered disbanded on September 8, 2009, when no owner committed his or her team to the league's eleventh season by that deadline. For legal reasons, af2 league officials and owners agreed to form a new legal entity, Arena Football 1 (AF1), with former AFL teams the Arizona Rattlers and Orlando Predators joining the former af2.

All assets of the Arena Football League were put up for auction. On November 11, 2009, the new league announced its intention to purchase the entire assets of the former AFL; the assets included the team names and logos of all but one of the former AFL and af2 teams. The lone exception was that of the Dallas Desperados; Desperados owner Jerry Jones had purposely designed the Desperados' properties around those of the Dallas Cowboys, making the two inseparable. The auction occurred on November 25, 2009. The assets were awarded to Arena Football 1 on December 7, 2009, with a winning bid of $6.1 million.

On February 17, 2010, AF1 announced it would use the "Arena Football League" name. The league announced plans for the upcoming season and details of its contract with NFL Network to broadcast AFL games in 2010. AF1 teams were given the option of restoring historical names to their teams. In addition to the historical teams, the league added two new expansion franchises, the Dallas Vigilantes and the Jacksonville Sharks.

For the 2011 season, the Philadelphia Soul, Kansas City Brigade, San Jose SaberCats, New Orleans VooDoo, and the Georgia Force returned to the AFL after having last played in 2008. However, the Grand Rapids Rampage, Colorado Crush, Columbus Destroyers, Los Angeles Avengers, and the New York Dragons did not return. The league added one expansion team, the Pittsburgh Power. Former Pittsburgh Steelers wide receiver Lynn Swann was one of the team's owners. It was the first time the AFL returned to Pittsburgh since the Pittsburgh Gladiators were an original franchise in 1987 before becoming the Tampa Bay Storm. The Brigade changed its name to the Command, becoming the Kansas City Command. Even though they were returning teams, the former af2 Bossier–Shreveport Battle Wings moved to New Orleans as the Voodoo, the identity formerly owned by New Orleans Saints owner Tom Benson. The former af2 Alabama Vipers moved to Duluth, Georgia, to become the new Georgia Force (the earlier franchise of that name having been a continuation of the first Nashville Kats franchise). On October 25, 2010, lt was announced that the Oklahoma City Yard Dawgz would not return. The Milwaukee Iron also changed names to the Milwaukee Mustangs, the name of Milwaukee's original AFL team that had existed from 1994 to 2001.

In 2012, the AFL celebrated its silver anniversary for its 25th season of operations. The season kicked off on March 9, 2012. The Tulsa Talons moved to San Antonio, Texas, and Jeffrey Vinik became owner of the Tampa Bay Storm. The Dallas Vigilantes were left off the schedule for the 2012 season with no announcement from the management, and the team was subsequently quietly folded with no formal announcement ever being released. The AFL postponed the free agency period to October 31 due to Hurricane Sandy, noting that the National Football League was simultaneously doing the same thing with regard to its trade deadline.

It was announced on December 12, 2012, that the AFL had reached a partnership agreement with NET10 Wireless to be the first non-motorsports-related professional sports league in the United States to have a title sponsor, renaming it the NET10 Wireless Arena Football League. The redesigned website showed the new logo which incorporated the current AFL logo with the one from NET10 Wireless. The title sponsorship agreement ended in 2014 after a two-year partnership.

In 2013, the league expanded with the addition of two new franchises to play in 2014, the Los Angeles Kiss, owned by Gene Simmons and Paul Stanley of the rock band Kiss, and the Portland Thunder.

In 2014, the league announced the granting of a new franchise to Mötley Crüe frontman Vince Neil, previously part-owner of the Jacksonville Sharks. That franchise, the Las Vegas Outlaws, played their home games at the Thomas & Mack Center, previously home to the Las Vegas Sting and Las Vegas Gladiators. After 20 years as a familiar name to the league, an AFL mainstay, the Iowa Barnstormers, departed the league to join the Indoor Football League. The San Antonio Talons folded on October 13, 2014, after the league (which owned the team) failed to find a new owner. On November 16, 2014, despite a successful season record-wise, the Pittsburgh Power became the second team to cease operations after the 2014 season. This resulted from poor attendance. It was later announced by the league that the Power would go dormant for 2015 and were looking for new ownership. No new ownership group ever materialized, however.

=== Contraction (2015–2017) ===
Jerry Kurz also stepped down as commissioner of the AFL as he was promoted to be the AFL's first president. Former Foxwoods CEO Scott Butera was hired as his successor as commissioner.

On August 9, 2015, ESPN reported that the New Orleans VooDoo and Las Vegas Outlaws had ceased operations. On September 1, 2015, the Spokane Shock officially left the AFL and joined the IFL under the new name Spokane Empire, becoming the fifth active AFL/af2 franchise to leave for the IFL since the 2009 AFL bankruptcy (Iowa Barnstormers, Tri-Cities Fever, Green Bay Blizzard, and Arkansas Twisters left previously).

On November 12, the league announced the defending champion San Jose SaberCats would be ceasing operations due to "reasons unrelated to league operations". A statement from the league indicated that the AFL was working to secure new, long-term owners for the franchise. This left the AFL with eight teams for 2016.

On January 6, 2016, the league took over "ownership and operational control" of the Portland Thunder from its previous owners. The AFL stated this move was made after months of trying to work out an arrangement "to provide financial and operational support." On February 3, 2016, it was announced that the franchise would start from scratch and no longer be called the "Thunder" as the name and trademarks belong to former franchise owner Terry Emmert (similar to the Jerry Jones move with the Desperados). AFL commissioner Scott Butera announced that a new identity would be announced at a later date. On February 24, 2016, the Thunder were rebranded as the Portland Steel.

The league's 2016 schedule, announced on the league's website on December 10, 2015, showed an eight-team league playing a 16-game regular season over 18 weeks, with two bye weeks for each team, one on a rotational basis and the other a "universal bye" for all teams during the Independence Day weekend, the first weekend in July. All teams qualified for the postseason, meaning that the regular season served only to establish seeding.

On February 10, 2016, The Washington Post and radio station WTOP-FM first broke the story that Monumental Sports & Entertainment (Ted Leonsis, chairman), which also owns the NHL's Washington Capitals, NBA's Washington Wizards, and WNBA's Washington Mystics, were "close to a deal" to bring a new expansion franchise to the Verizon Center. On March 10, 2016, AFL commissioner Scott Butera announced that the deal was finalized and that the new Washington, D.C., team would begin play in 2017. On July 14, 2016, the team name was revealed as the Washington Valor. There was also talk for franchises to return to San Antonio and St. Louis as well as a potential new team for Sacramento. However, when the 2017 schedule was announced, there was no mention of any San Antonio, St. Louis, or Sacramento teams.

On October 12, 2016, both the Orlando Predators and Jacksonville Sharks announced their departure from the league, with Jacksonville establishing the National Arena League and the Predators, after a period of dormancy, being reclaimed by some of its former players and also joining the NAL in 2019. The next day, it was reported that the Arizona Rattlers were in the planning stages to also leave the AFL for the Indoor Football League for 2017. In the same report, it was stated the Los Angeles Kiss and Portland Steel had apparently folded after both teams failed to return calls or respond to inquiries into 2017 season ticket purchases. Later on October 13, the league held a teleconference with the remaining team owners and issued a statement the next morning declaring that the league would continue in the long-term, although the league did not expressly commit to playing in 2017 at that time. On October 14, the AFL held a dispersal draft with the five teams selecting players from the Jacksonville, Los Angeles, Orlando, and Portland rosters. The Rattlers then officially left the AFL for the IFL on October 17, leaving the AFL with four teams. They were the sixth AFL team to leave for the IFL since the 2010 relaunch. On November 14, the AFL announced that it had granted a second franchise to Washington Valor owner Ted Leonsis to be based out of Baltimore for the 2017 season, the Baltimore Brigade, bringing the league up to five teams.

On August 23, 2017, the week of ArenaBowl XXX, multiple sources revealed that the AFL planned to expand to Albany, New York, and Newark, New Jersey, for 2018. The Albany Empire was confirmed October 24, with the team owned by Hearst Communications executive George Randolph Hearst III and sharing non-football management with the Philadelphia Soul. There was never another mention of a Newark team in the offseason. On November 28, the Cleveland Gladiators announced that they would have to take a two-year leave of absence while their arena, shared with its primary tenant the NBA's Cleveland Cavaliers, was undergoing construction during the basketball offseason. The next month, the longest-tenured AFL team, with franchise roots to the inaugural AFL season, the Tampa Bay Storm, also suspended operations citing financial problems.

=== Reorganization and second bankruptcy (2018–2019) ===
The league's third logo, used only in 2019

In February 2018, the 2018 season schedule was finalized with only the four remaining teams, matching the size of the league in the original "demonstration season" in 1987. However, the collective bargaining agreement (CBA) between the AFL and Arena Football League Players' Union (AFLPU) had expired after the 2017 season. A new agreement had not been made despite several proposals and supposed ultimatums between the two parties leading to rumors that the season and league's existence were in jeopardy. On March 16, 2018, a new deal on a four-year CBA was reached, nearly doubling player compensation and granting expanded health insurance benefits.

On March 27, 2018, the AFL announced that commissioner Scott Butera would be replaced by former AOL counsel Randall Boe prior to the 2018 season. The AFL also partnered with DraftKings to bring back AFL Fantasy Football. The league continued organizational changes for the 2019 season with Philadelphia Soul owner Ron Jaworski taking over as chairman of the executive committee, moving the league's headquarters from Las Vegas to Philadelphia, and naming John Adams as president and chief operating officer.

On December 27, 2018, the AFL introduced a new set of logos to be used beginning with the 2019 season. The league announced an expansion team in Atlantic City, New Jersey, on January 22, 2019, that was to be operated by the same ownership group as the Albany Empire. On February 7, 2019, the league re-added the Columbus Destroyers as another expansion team to bring the league back to six teams. On May 3, 2019, the AFL and ESPN Inc. announced a new media rights agreement to broadcast all games on ESPN3 with ArenaBowl XXXII to be broadcast on ESPN2.

After the season, league commissioner Boe announced the closure of all six of the league's teams. The closure came as the league re-evaluated its business model and worked to respond to a lawsuit filed against the league by its former worker's compensation insurance provider. Boe also stated that they had not made the decision to suspend operations for the entire league at that time (raising the possibility that if the league did return, it would do so under a touring model similar to the Premier Lacrosse League or basketball's BIG3) and that a decision on the league's future would most likely be announced near the end of 2019.

Approximately a month after the announcement of the closure of teams, on November 27, 2019, commissioner Boe announced via the league's Twitter account that the league would be filing for Chapter 7 bankruptcy and fully cease operations, citing a lack of capital and unresolved liabilities.

=== Third incarnation (2024) ===
On February 1, 2023, G6 Sports Group (based in Toronto, Ontario), a new ownership group that had acquired the league's trademarks and social media accounts, announced another revival of the league which began play in 2024. This league is not directly related to the previous league. The league lasted one season before all of its remaining teams left to form Arena Football One prior to 2025.

== Season format and ArenaBowl ==
The second iteration's final 2019 season consisted of a 13-week schedule during which each team played 12 games and had one bye week. Each of the six teams played each opponent at least once. At the end of the regular season, the top four teams participated in the ArenaBowl playoffs, in which the top seed faced the 4th seed while the 2nd seed faced the 3rd seed in a home and home series. The team in each series with the higher aggregate score advanced to the ArenaBowl. While the semifinals had two games for each pair of teams, the ArenaBowl was still one game.

From the league's inception through ArenaBowl XVIII, the championship game was played at the home of the higher-seeded remaining team. The AFL then switched to a neutral-site championship, with ArenaBowls XIX and XX in Las Vegas. New Orleans Arena, home of the New Orleans VooDoo, served as the site of ArenaBowl XXI on July 29, 2007. This was the first professional sports championship to be staged in the city since Hurricane Katrina struck in August 2005. ArenaBowl XXI in New Orleans was deemed a success, and the city was chosen to host ArenaBowl XXII. In 2010, the location returned to being decided by which of the two participating teams was seeded higher. ArenaBowl XXV (2012) returned to a neutral site and was once again played in New Orleans. From 2014 to 2017 and 2019, the ArenaBowl was played at the venue of the higher-seeded team, thus reverting to the original format. With one week remaining in the 2018 season, it was announced that the ArenaBowl would be awarded to the semifinal winner with the higher regular season average attendance. This rule was then not used in 2018 after the Washington Valor's home field, Capital One Arena, already had scheduled renovations starting at the end of the Valor's season; the championship would then be played in Baltimore despite the Valor's higher attendance. In 2019, the ArenaBowl was hosted by the higher seed.

== Rules ==
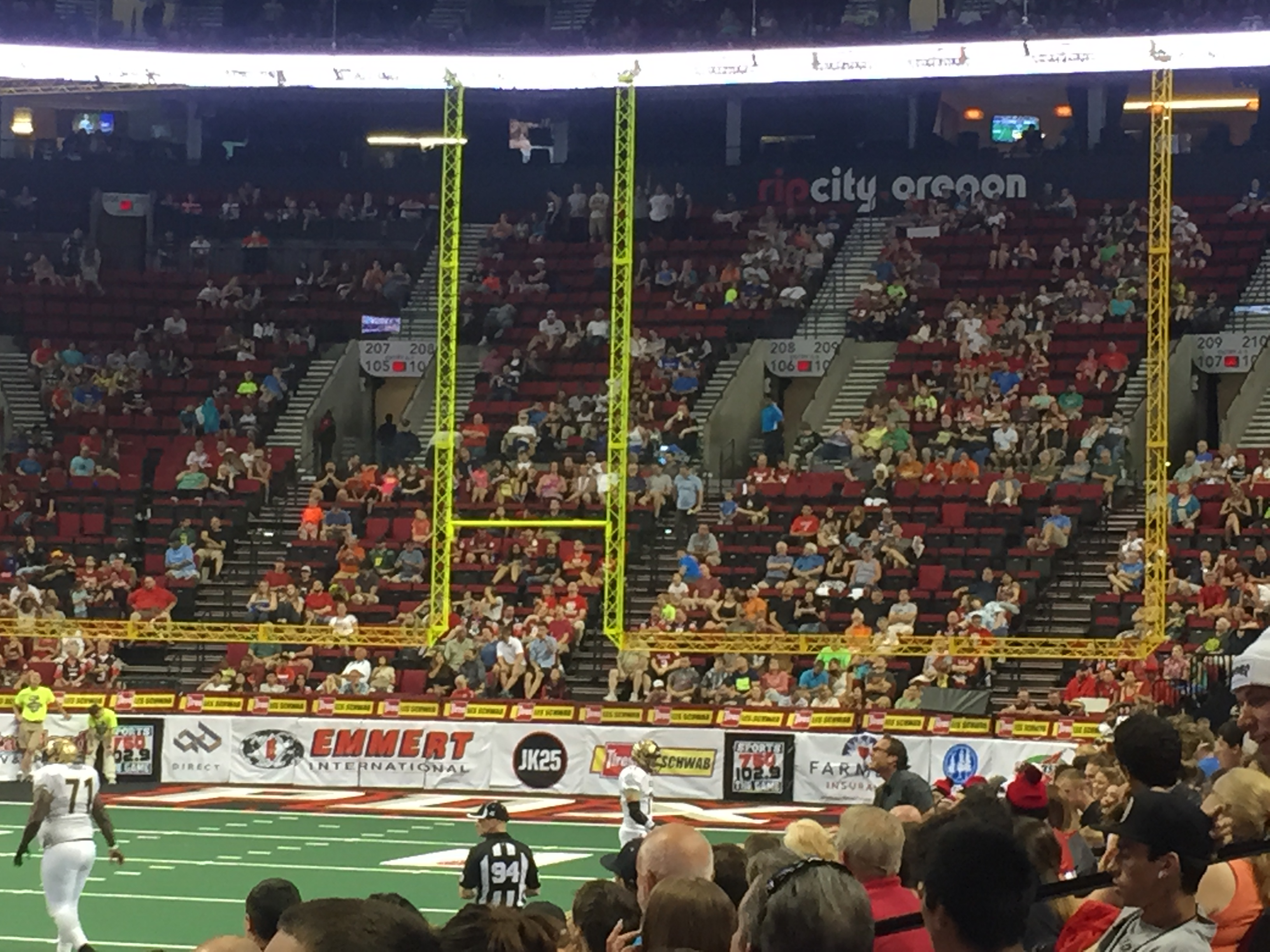
An AFL goalpost

- The field: An indoor padded surface 85 feet (26 m) wide and 50 yards (46 m) long with 8-yard (7.3 m) end zones. Goal posts are 9 feet (2.7 m) wide with a crossbar height of 15 feet (4.6 m) (NFL goalposts are 18.5 feet (5.6 m) wide with the crossbar at 10 feet (3.0 m)). The goalside rebound nets are 30 feet (9.1 m) wide by 32 feet (9.8 m) high. Any ball bouncing off of the nets, whether thrown or kicked, prior to contacting the ground, is live, as are balls off of the nets' supporting systems. The bottom of the nets are 8 feet (2.4 m) above the ground. Sideline barriers are 4 feet (1.2 m) high and made of high density foam rubber.
- Equipment: the official football is the same size and weight as a National Football League ball, but with proprietary Arena Football insignia.
- Players and formations: eight players on the field; 21-man active roster; four-man inactive roster
- Substitutions: free substitution; some players may play both ways either by coach's choice or to step in because of injury. (The free substitution rule was adopted in 2007; prior to this, the AFL mandated a one-platoon system, from which two players on each side of the ball, the "specialists" and the quarterback or kicker, were exempt.)
- Formation: four offensive players, including a wide receiver, must line up on the line of scrimmage. Of the three interior linemen, one must raise his hand indicating that he is an eligible receiver and hence a tight end, the other lineman being considered a guard. Three defensive players must be down linemen (in a three or four-point stance). Only the "Mac" linebacker may blitz on either side of the center. The "Jack" linebacker is restricted in where he can go prior to the ball crossing the line of scrimmage. Alignment is two or more yards off the line of scrimmage. No stunting or twisting. Offensive motion in the backfield: one receiver may go in a forward motion before the snap.
- Timing: four 15 minute quarters with a 15-minute halftime (in the ArenaBowl, 30 minutes). The clock stops for out-of-bounds plays and incomplete passes only in the last half-minute of regulation and overtime and when the referee deems it necessary for penalties, injuries or timeouts. Except in the last half-minute of regulation, the clock continues to run after a touchdown is scored until the extra-point conversion has been attempted. Each team is allowed three timeouts per half, and two per overtime period if regulation ends tied; as in the NFL, any injury in last half-minute of regulation or overtime costs that player's team a timeout (exception applies to when team has no timeouts, and their player is injured, they're allowed a 4th timeout). Before 2018, the league had clock stoppage rules for the final minute of each half that now are only implemented in the final half-minute of regulation and overtime. Also, prior to 2018 a team with the lead and possession of the ball in the last minute had to gain positive yards on a play from scrimmage or the clock was stopped until the next snap, effectively outlawing the "victory formation". The play clock is 30 seconds.
- Movement of the ball and scoring: four downs are allowed to advance the ball ten yards for a first down, or to score. Six points for a touchdown. One point for a conversion by place kick after a touchdown or if a safety is scored off any conversion attempt, two points for a conversion by drop kick or for successful run or pass after a touchdown. Three points for a field goal by placement or fair catch kick or four points for a field goal by drop kick. Two points for a safety and for a defensive turnover on a conversion attempt returned the length of the field (a play which would be a defensive touchdown under any circumstances other than its occurring during a conversion attempt).
- Kicking: kickoffs are from the goal line, to begin the halves and odd overtimes, or after any score. Kickers may use a one-inch tee. All kicks must be made by either place kick or drop kick; punting is prohibited. The receiving team may field any kick that rebounds off the net or its surrounding framework and lands in the field of play. Any kickoff that goes out of bounds untouched or hits an overhead structure is to be placed at the 20-yard line or the place where it went out of bounds, whichever is more advantageous to the receiving team. If a kickoff goes beyond the end zone and stays in bounds (such as kicking it into the field goal "slack net" or if the ball goes under the net), the ball will come out to the five-yard line. The touchback is not automatic; players must attempt to advance the ball out of their own end zone if it is caught there. The same is true if a missed field goal attempt goes beyond the goal line but is short of the rebound net. If the receiving player chooses not to take the ball out of the end zone (takes a knee) or is tackled in the end zone, the ball is placed on the 2½-yard line (the attempted runback does not result in a safety unless the runner crosses the goal line onto the field of play and then retreats into the end zone under his own impetus and is tackled there). Any field goal or extra point attempted by drop kick is worth one additional point (thus four points for a drop-kicked field goal or two for drop-kicked conversion).
- Passing: passing rules in arena football are the same as outdoor NCAA football in which receivers must have one foot inbounds. A unique exception involves the rebound nets. A forward pass that rebounds off the end zone net is a live ball and is in play until it touches the playing surface, as is a ball which bounces off of the padding of the sideline boards, provided it has not been touched by a member of the crowd. A player who goes over the boards to catch a ball and maintains possession of the ball to the floor is awarded a catch even if he lands out of bounds.
- Overtime: overtime periods are now 15 minutes during the regular season and the playoffs. In the first overtime each team gets one possession to score, unless the first team to possess yields a defensive touchdown or a safety, either of which ends the game immediately. Whoever is ahead after one possession for each team wins. If the teams are tied after each has had a possession, whoever scores next by any means wins. Multiple overtime periods will be played if needed in case of a tie and play continues in true sudden death thereafter for both regular-season and postseason games.
- Coaching challenges: Coaches are allowed two challenges per game; to do so, they must throw the red challenge flag before the next play. If the play stands as called after the play is reviewed, the team loses a timeout; however, if it is reversed they keep their timeout. If a team wins two straight challenges they are granted a third. In lieu of coaching challenges, reviews are automatic in the final half-minute of regulation and in all overtime periods, as they are for all scoring plays and all turnovers.
- Offsides: Defensive players may not jump offsides twice in any half; they risk ejection for the rest of the half if they do (this penalty is enforced in addition to the yardage penalty). Defensive players called for jumping offsides in overtime risk disqualification.
- Targeting, such as using the helmet to ram another player is prohibited, and players who do so risk immediate disqualification, plus a 15-yard penalty.
- Like the NCAA, CFL, and NFL, players are warned once for their first unsportsmanlike conduct penalty, and if they pick up another, they risk immediate disqualification. Flagrant fouls involving non-football violent acts or flagrantly unsportsmanlike conduct result in immediate disqualification.

== Growth of the league ==
=== Season format changes ===
The practice of playing one or two preseason exhibition games by each team before the start of the regular season was discontinued when the NBC contract was initiated, and the regular season was extended from 14 games during the 1996 to 2000 seasons to 16 from 2001 to 2010. From 2011 to 2015, the regular season league expanded to 18 games, with each team having two bye weeks and the option of two preseason games. Since the 2015 season and the decreasing league membership, the season length also decreased, first to 16 games in 2016, then to 14 games in 2017, and 12 games in 2018.

=== China Arena Football League and AFL Global ===
In August 2012, Ganlan Media International received exclusive rights from the AFL to establish a new Chinese arena football league. The league was eventually named the China Arena Football League (CAFL). The CAFL project is headed up by Martin E. Judge Jr. and Ron Jaworski, who were both part of the Philadelphia Soul's ownership group. The original plans were to establish a six-team league that would play a 10-week schedule that was slated to start in October 2014. The AFL coaches and trainers were to travel to China to help teach the rules of the sport to squads made up of Chinese and American players with the goal of starting an official Chinese arena league. Following delays, the league began its first full season in 2016; however, subsequent play was postponed until a heavily abbreviated tournament was played in 2019.

The CAFL is not directly affiliated with the AFL and is instead owned by AFL Global, LLC, an entity that was created by Martin E. Judge Jr.

== Hall of Fame ==
The AFL had its own Hall of Fame consisting of players, coaches, and contributors who have significantly impacted the league. The AFL Hall of Fame solely existed to honor various AFL affiliates. This was the highest honor for any personnel who have been involved with the AFL. It had no physical location and existed solely as a list of players and contributors maintained by the league itself.

The Arena Football Hall of Fame was not affiliated with the Pro Football Hall of Fame.

=== Former AFL contributors in the Pro Football Hall of Fame ===
- Kurt Warner, quarterback, Iowa Barnstormers, 1995–1997, inducted in the Class of 2017
- Pat Bowlen, owner, Colorado Crush, 2003–2008, inducted in the Class of 2019 (Bowlen's business partner in the Crush, John Elway, was inducted into the Hall as a player in 2004)
- Joe DeLamielleure, offensive lineman/defensive lineman, Charlotte Rage, 1992, inducted in the Class of 2003 (note that DeLamielleure's time in the AFL was largely a publicity stunt and that DeLamielleure saw only limited action in two games)

== Media ==
=== Television ===
==== 2000s ====
In 2000 the AFL had a television deal with TNN, ESPN, ESPN2 and ABC worth more than $25 million. Beginning with the 2003 season, the AFL made a deal with NBC to televise league games, which was renewed for another two years in 2005. In conjunction with this, the league moved the beginning of the season from May to February (the week after the NFL's Super Bowl) and scheduled most of its games on Sunday instead of Friday or Saturday as it had in the past. In 2006, because of the XX Winter Olympic Games, the Stanley Cup playoffs and the Daytona 500, NBC scaled back from weekly coverage to scattered coverage during the regular season, but committed to a full playoff schedule ending with the 20th ArenaBowl. NBC and the Arena Football League officially severed ties on June 30, 2006, having failed to reach a new broadcast deal. Las Vegas owner Jim Ferraro stated during a radio interview that the reason efforts to make a deal failed was that ESPN refused to show highlights or scores or even mention Arena football as long as it was being aired on NBC.

For the 2006 season only, the AFL added a national cable deal with OLN (later the now-defunct NBC Sports Network) for eleven regular-season games and one playoff game.

On December 19, 2006, ESPN announced the purchase of a minority stake in the AFL. This deal included television rights for the ESPN family of networks. ESPN would televise a minimum of 17 regular season games, most on Monday nights, and nine playoff games, including ArenaBowl XXI on ABC. The deal resulted in added exposure on ESPN's SportsCenter. However, after the original AFL filed for bankruptcy, this arrangement did not carry over to the new AFL, which was a separate legal entity. The AFL also had a regional-cable deal with FSN, where FSN regional affiliates in AFL markets carried local team games.

==== 2010s ====
After its return in 2010, the AFL had its national television deal with the NFL Network for a weekly Friday night game. All AFL games not on the NFL Network could be seen for free online, provided by Ustream.

The NFL Network ceased airing live Arena Football League games partway through the 2012 season as a result of ongoing labor problems within the league. Briefly, the games were broadcast on a tape delay to prevent the embarrassment that would result should the players stage a work stoppage immediately prior to a scheduled broadcast. (In at least once incidence this actually happened, resulting in a non-competitive game being played with replacement players, and further such incidents were threatened.) Once the labor issues were resolved, the NFL Network resumed the practice of broadcasting a live Friday night game. NFL Network dropped the league at the end of the 2012 season.

For the 2013 season, the league's new national broadcast partner was the CBS Sports Network. CBSSN would air 19 regular season games and two playoff games. CBS would also air the ArenaBowl, marking the first time since 2008 that the league's finale aired on network television. Regular season CBSSN broadcast games were usually on Saturday nights. As the games were shown live, the start times were not uniform as with most football broadcast packages, but varied with the time zone in which the home team was located. This meant that the AFL may have appeared either prior to or following the CBSSN's featured Major League Lacrosse game.

In 2014, ESPN returned to the AFL as broadcast partners, with weekly games being shown on CBS Sports Network, ESPN, ESPN2 and ESPNEWS along with all games being broadcast on ESPN3 for free live on WatchESPN and the ESPN app. ArenaBowl XXVII and XXVIII were also broadcast on ESPN. Most teams also had a local TV station broadcast their games locally and all games were available on local radio. In 2016, Univision Deportes began airing select AFL games during the regular season. For the 2017 season, one AFL game per week was broadcast live nationally over CBS Sports Network. In 2017, the AFL also began streaming some games on Twitter and AFLNow, the league's streaming service. For the 2018 season, the AFL's sole national English language telecast partner was the CBS Sports Network, but all games were streamed free online and Brigade and Valor games were available over their owner Ted Leonsis' Monumental Sports Network. In 2019, all games were available via streaming on ESPN3, except for ArenaBowl 32, which was aired over ESPN2.

=== Video games ===
The first video game based on the AFL was Arena Football for the C-64 released in 1988. On May 18, 2000, Kurt Warner's Arena Football Unleashed was released by Midway Games for the PlayStation game console. On February 7, 2006, EA Sports released Arena Football for the PlayStation 2 and Xbox. EA Sports released another AFL video game, titled Arena Football: Road to Glory, on February 21, 2007, for the PlayStation 2.

=== Literature ===
In 2001, Jeff Foley published War on the Floor: An Average Guy Plays in the Arena Football League and Lives to Write About It. The book details a journalist's two preseasons (1999 and 2000) as an offensive specialist/writer with the now-defunct Albany Firebirds. The 5-foot-6 (170 cm), self-described "unathletic writer" played in three preseason games and had one catch for −2 yards.

== AFL Commissioners ==
- Jim Foster – 1987–1992
- Joe O'Hara – 1992–1993
- Jim Drucker – 1994–1996
- C. David Baker – 1997–2008
- Ed Policy (interim) – 2008–2009
- Jerry Kurz – 2010–2015
- Scott Butera – 2015–2017
- Randall Boe – 2018–2019

== League office locations ==
- Chicago (1987–2009, 2012–2014)
- Tulsa (2009–2011)
- Las Vegas (2015–2017)
- Philadelphia (2018–2019)

== League finances ==
For its second iteration from 2010 to 2019, the AFL ran under a single-entity model, with the league owning the rights to the teams, players, and coaches. The single-entity model was adopted in 2010 when the league emerged from bankruptcy. Prior to that, the league followed the franchise model more common in North American professional sports leagues; each team essentially operated as its own business with different owners and the league itself was a separate entity which in exchange for franchise fees paid by the team owners provided rules, officials, scheduling and the other elements of organizational structure, while a pool of money was allotted to teams to aid in travel costs. Expansion fees increased from $250,000 in 1993 to $16.2 million by 2003. In 2005 the Kansas City Brigade owners paid an $18 million franchise fee, a league record.

In 2019, at the time the AFL filed for bankruptcy, it was operated on a $20 million budget.

=== Players compensation ===
For most of the 1990s, the average annual salary for an arena football player was around $22,000 plus additional bonuses for victories and postseason awards, without injury benefits. In 2000, a group of players filed a class-action antitrust suit against the AFL claiming "price-fixed salaries" by league teams and requesting injury compensation, which led to the league owners threatening to cancel the upcoming season, and requested to negotiate a collective bargaining agreement (CBA) in order to elude United States antitrust laws. To avoid season cancellation, a new group called the "Arena Football League Players' Organizing Committee" (which later became the "Arena Football League Players Association") was formed, which represented the majority of AFL players, and negotiated the AFL's first CBA with league owners as the acting labor union. The union negotiated reduced free agent eligibility (from eight years to four), year-round health care for players and their immediate families, improved safety measures (including replacement of playing fields), raising the average player's salary to $35,000 (and average team payroll to $700,000 from $540,000 in 1999 season) and a 401(k) retirement plan, in exchange for a "hard" salary cap of $1,375,000 per team for the 2001 season (but with a salary cap exception for "Franchise Players"), which included player salaries, win bonuses, player health and insurance coverage and a player housing allowance.

In 2003, the league agreed to "freeze" the salary cap in a new CBA at $1,643,000 for 2003 season, with increases for the following years: $1,684,075 (2004), $1,743,018 (2005), $1,821,453 (2006), $1,921,633 (2007), $2,036,931 (2008), $2,179,517 (2009) and $2,332,083 (2010). The CBA also stated that the owners would not be able to lower the cap until the agreement expires. Players were also eligible for housing stipend if they resided year-round within 75 miles of the team's home arena. By 2009, the league minimum salary was $31,000 and $80,000 on average ($125,000 for quarterbacks), while the highest-paid player was Tony Graziani, with a salary of over $200,000, including bonuses.

The increased salaries were a major factor in the decision to go dormant for the 2009 season, after failed attempts by the owners to cancel the CBA, as several teams reported losing $2 million a year. It was believed that they were hoping for a plan similar to one used by the af2, which operated as a single-tax entity, or launching a new 11-man outdoor development league called the United National Gridiron League to replace the recently defunct NFL Europe. When the af2 took over as the new AFL and relaunched in 2010, players were paid $400 per game, similar to the af2. Three players on each team were eligible for designation as a "franchise" player, and received a salary of $1,000 per game. The league also offered financial aid for housing and meal expenses.

In 2012, the players formed a new union called the "Arena Football League Players Union" (AFLPU), and signed a new CBA that stated that all players would be paid equally: $830 per game for a "veteran" player and $775 for "rookies" plus a housing plan and three meals a day, with quarterbacks earning an extra $250 per start. The salary would increase gradually to $925 and $870 (respectively) until 2017, the last year of the CBA. In the last CBA, a new salary cap was put in place ($438,480) with a salary "floor" of $340,000 for a 14-game season, and a $501,120 cap with a $388,576 floor for a 16-game season. Players signed one-year contracts, as veteran "compensation range" was $1,100–1,455 per game, while rookies earned between $650 and $1,000 a game. In addition, player could earn up to $1,000 every year for local business appearances, while per-diem allowance were $41-a-day. In case of a mid-season trade players would have got $500 for moving costs.

=== Accusation of mismanagement and unpaid bills ===
In the late 2010s the AFL's entity ownership, Arena Football One, LLC, had been at the center of much controversy over mismanagement of franchises, unpaid bills and several lawsuits against them.

==== Jerry Kurz lawsuit ====
On July 21, 2016, league co-founder, former commissioner and president Jerry Kurz filed a class action lawsuit against Arena Football One, LLC, and his successor as commissioner, Scott Butera, for what was deemed "breach of contract" after his effective demotion and subsequent firing following the 2015 season. In August 2018, that lawsuit was dismissed, a new action was filed and ultimately settled. Kurz left for the IFL as Director of Business Development. Kurz now serves as general counsel for the new Arena Football One in 2025.

== League progression ==
| Season | Teams | Average attendance |
|---|---|---|
| 1986 (Test Season) | 2 | —N/a |
| 1987 | 4 | 11,278 |
| 1988 | 6 | 8,512 |
| 1989 | 5 | 5,705 |
| 1990 | 6 | 8,900 |
| 1991 | 8 | 10,250 |
| 1992 | 12 | 12,268 |
| 1993 | 10 | 11,530 |
| 1994 | 11 | 10,748 |
| 1995 | 13 | 11,260 |
| 1996 | 15 | 10,787 |
| 1997 | 14 | 10,935 |
| 1998 | 14 | 10,594 |
| 1999 | 15 | 10,013 |
| 2000 | 16 | 9,618 |
| 2001 | 19 | 9,188 |
| 2002 | 16 | 9,958 |
| 2003 | 16 | 11,397 |
| 2004 | 19 | 12,019 |
| 2005 | 17 | 12,829 |
| 2006 | 18 | 12,378 |
| 2007 | 19 | 12,392 |
| 2008 | 17 | 12,957 |
| 2009 | —N/a | —N/a |
| 2010 | 15 | 8,135 |
| 2011 | 18 | 8,241 |
| 2012 | 17 | 7,841 |
| 2013 | 14 | 8,195 |
| 2014 | 14 | 8,473 |
| 2015 | 12 | 8,947 |
| 2016 | 8 | 9,342 |
| 2017 | 5 | 9,248 |
| 2018 | 4 | 7,767 |
| 2019 | 6 | 7,195 |

Average attendance for AFL games were around 10,000–11,000 per game in the 1990s, though during the recession connected to the dot-com bubble and the September 11 attacks average attendance dropped below 10,000 for several years. From the start of the 2004 season until the final season of the original league in 2008, average attendance was above 12,000, with 12,392 in 2007. Eleven of the seventeen teams in operation in 2007 had average attendance figures over 13,000. In 2008, the overall attendance average increased to 12,957 (the highest count achieved by the league), with eight teams exceeding 13,000 per game.

In 2010, the first year of the reconstituted league following bankruptcy, the overall attendance average decreased to 8,135, with only one team (Tampa Bay) exceeding 13,000 per game. The 2019 average per game attendance of 7,195 was the second-lowest attendance average in league history, only exceeded by 1989's per-game average of 5,705.

== See also ==
- Arena Football Hall of Fame
- List of leagues of American football
- List of Arena Football League seasons
- Arena Football League arenas
- NFL Europe
- Professional sports leagues in the United States
