= Jim Foster (American football) =

American football executive

James Foster is an American former football executive and innovator. He invented the game of arena football, and was the founder and first commissioner of the Arena Football League (AFL). Foster was also a National Football League (NFL) and United States Football League (USFL) executive. and was later the managing owner of both the AFL's Iowa Barnstormers and the AF2's Quad City Steamwheelers.

== Biography ==
Born and raised in Iowa City, Iowa, Foster graduated from the University of Iowa in 1972 with a Bachelor of General Studies in advertising/marketing and broadcast journalism. He worked on air for University of Iowa radio stations WSUI and KICR. At Iowa, Foster lettered in track and field and cross country running while also being a member and officer in the Sigma Phi Epsilon fraternity. He also served as the paid executive director of the 22-house fraternity system at the University of Iowa from 1970 to 1972.

In 1974, he founded, played and served as club director of the Newton Nite Hawks minor league football team of the Northern States AAA Pro Football League (NSFL). After winning the league championship in 1975, Foster worked with a well known European soccer coach and sports promoter Bob Kapp, to organize and introduce the sport of American (pro level) football to Europe for the first time, during a five-game exhibition tour in June 1977 between the Nite Hawks and the Chicago Lions of the Northern States AAA Pro Football League playing exhibition games in major European cities, including Paris, Lille, Frankfurt, Gratz and Vienna.

In the fall of 1977, he was hired away from the Nite Hawks to take over the reins of the struggling NSFL Quad City Mohawks in Rock Island, Illinois. Foster rebranded the club as the Black Hawks, as well as rebuilding the team roster. That led to their first winning season in a decade and a berth in the 1978 NSFL Championship game. In June 1979 Foster, working with a major European based sports/events promotion firm, Keith Prowse Co., conducted a 2nd European Pro Football 5 game tour featuring the Black Hawks vs. the Indianapolis Capitols, also of the NSFL, playing in Brussels, Antwerp, Rotterdam and Frankfurt, (2 games).

Following that second European venture, in the fall of 1979, Foster was hired by the NFL to become the promotion manager of NFL Properties, (marketing and licensing). During his tenure with the NFL (1979–82) he invented the game of arena football while watching the Major Indoor Soccer League All-Star game being played at Madison Square Garden on February 11, 1981. He sketched out a diagram along with basic rules on the back of a 9" × 12" manila envelope.

Foster opted to leave the NFL in September 1982 to pursue a goal of managing a major professional football team, taking an offer to help launch the Phoenix-based Arizona Wranglers as assistant general manager during their inaugural 1983 season in the new USFL. After the season ended, he then accepted an offer to move back to the Midwest to serve as executive vice president of the Chicago Blitz of the USFL.

When the fateful decision was later made to move the USFL in 1985 from a spring season to a fall season on a head-to-head basis with the NFL, Foster made a pivotal decision to begin working full-time on carefully testing and researching the mechanics and basic rules of the new game he had invented before actually launching the Arena Football League (AFL), starting play in early June 1987. Foster served as founding president and commissioner from 1985 to 1992, at which time he stepped down to begin the initial development of his own AFL team, the Iowa Barnstormers, which would bring professional football to his home state of Iowa for the first time, playing in the state's capitol and largest city, Des Moines. After staging a very successful and well received sold-out preseason, market test game on April 22, 1993, Foster opted to move forward, completing the raising of the required capital to fund and operate the team and launch operations in June 1994 in preparation for a 1995 inaugural season. He served as its Managing Owner through 2001. A very difficult decision was made to sell the team due to rapidly raising personnel operating expenses, as well as having to continue to play in an iconic, but antiqued and undersized venue in Des Moines. The AFL Barnstormers were sold to NHL NY Islanders owner Charles Wong and moved to Long Island in New York to become the New York Dragons.

In 1999 Foster co-founded and helped organize the AFL's developmental league, af2, in addition to founding and organizing the Quad City Steamwheelers af2 team in 1999 and serving as managing owner through the 2006 season. The Steamwheelers won back to back af2 titles in 2000 and 2001 with a 33–1 record. They were undefeated in their inaugural season going 19–0, (a recognized all time pro football record).

In 1990, thanks to a lengthy, successful effort by well known Chicago-based intellectual properties attorney, William Niro, Foster was granted a US patent on the game of arena football and the equipment unique to it, particularly the end zone Goalside Rebound Nets and padded Sideline Barriers, meaning that other indoor football leagues not affiliated with the AFL were legally required to play by at least somewhat different rules than the ones the AFL uses until the patent expired in September 2007. As a result, Arena Football became the first USA based team sport to ever play with a US patent in place. This primarily included no use of the Goalside/cross bar and flanking nets apparatus, as well as that no active usage of the Sideline Barriers could be incorporated into game playing rules. Additional patents were also secured for the arena football game system on an international basis, primarily in multiple European countries and also Mexico. The AFL/patent holders attempted to claim that several other properties of the game were covered under the patent, but a successful 1998 lawsuit from a competing upstart league, (which continues to play today without the goalside net system, instead hanging a simple plastic goal from the arena rafters) narrowed the AFL's patent mainly to the Goalside/cross bar/flanking nets apparatus).

Foster and his family, (Susan, Nile and Palmer) moved from Chicago to Des Moines in August 1994 and lived there from 1994 to 2002 while he operated the Iowa Barnstormers in the AFL through the 2000 season and then as an af2 team for the 2001 season. He also served on the Iowa State Historical Society foundation board, 1998–2002 while living in Des Moines. Foster moved his family to Davenport, Iowa, in August 2002 to oversee operations of the Steamwheelers on a full-time basis.

Jim Foster was inducted into the American Football Association's Minor Pro Football Hall of Fame in 1982, the Arena Football League Hall of Fame inaugural class in 1998 and the af2, (arena football2 league) inaugural Hall of Fame class of 2009 and the Intellectual Properties Lawyers Hall of Fame from Iowa, class of 2008. Foster served is an adjunct professor in the Tippie College of Business, a Pappajohn Entrepreneurial Center in Iowa City, teaching pro sports management from 2011 to 2013, in addition to continuing his ongoing sports/events and marketing-related consulting projects work through Fostering Sports, Inc. based in Davenport. He continues to do collegiate level guest lecturing and mentoring, as well as motivational themed public speaking and interviews. He also served on the board of the Quad Cities area Iowa Athletics I Club Board of Directors (2008–2020) and is also a member of the Iowa Gamma Sigma Phi Epsilon Alumni Board of Directors (2010-).

== Personal life ==
His younger son Palmer, became a 3rd generation Iowa Hawkeye student-athlete, following in the footsteps of his grandfather Derrold (Pat) Foster (football, track and JV basketball and baseball 1945–1949), then by his father Jim. Palmer played Hawkeye football 2011–2013, and was a letter winner and honor student. After graduating from Iowa in 2014, Palmer was selected and received a post graduate academic-athletic scholarship to play and coach football with the Durham University Saints in Durham UK, 2014–2015 in the British University League while earning a master's degree at Durham. He then played one season of American pro level football in the Polish American Football league, followed by 6 seasons in the British Premiere American Football League, 2016-2019 and 2021-2022 where he earned multiple honors for his play as an outside linebacker. He also was selected after a multi step tryout process as a member of the Italian National American Football team in 2019 and played in two European Championship series games vs. the Swiss National team in Zurich and the Austrian National team in Vienna, (both wins).

== See also ==
- Foster Trophy
