= 1989 Detroit Drive season =

Arena Football League team season

- Head coach: Tim Marcum
- Home stadium: Joe Louis Arena

Results
- Record: 3–1
- Division place: 1st
- Playoffs: Won Semi-Finals (Bruisers) 43-10; Won ArenaBowl III (Gladiators) 39–26
- Team MVP: George LaFrance

The 1989 Detroit Drive season was the second season for the Drive. They finished 3–1 and won ArenaBowl III.

== Regular season ==
=== Schedule ===
Week	Date	Opponent	Results		Game site
Week	Date	Opponent	Final score	Team record	Game site
1	July 7	at Chicago Bruisers	W 40–28	1–0	Rosemont Horizon
2	July 15	Maryland Commandos	W 39–7	2–0	Neutral Site
3	July 21	Denver Dynamite	L 14–15	2–1	Joe Louis Arena
4	July 28	Pittsburgh Gladiators	W 61–34	3–1	Neutral Site
5	Bye				

=== Standings ===
1989 Arena Football League standings
Team	W	L	T	PCT	PF	PA	PF (Avg.)	PA (Avg.)	STK
xy-Detroit Drive	3	1	0	.750	154	84	38.5	21	W 1
x-Pittsburgh Gladiators	3	1	0	.750	159	147	39.75	36.75	W 1
x-Denver Dynamite	3	1	0	.750	94	97	23.5	24.25	W 2
x-Chicago Bruisers	1	3	0	.250	167	155	41.75	38.75	L 1
Maryland Commandos	0	4	0	.000	79	170	19.75	42.5	L 4

== Playoffs ==
Round	Date	Opponent	Results		Game site
Round	Date	Opponent	Final score	Team record	Game site
Semi-finals	August 11	Chicago Bruisers	W 43–10	1–0	Joe Louis Arena
ArenaBowl III	August 18	Pittsburgh Gladiators	W 39–26	2–0	Joe Louis Arena

== Roster ==
1989 Detroit Drive roster
Quarterbacks: -- Tony Burris; 17 Mike Trigg; Wide Receivers/Defensive Backs: -- Everett Brown; -- David Evans; 22 Steve Griffin; 27 George LaFrance; 1 Gary Mullen	Running Backs/Linebackers: -- Lynn Bradford; 44 Alvin Rettig; Offensive Linemen/Defensive Linemen: -- Rodney Beachum; -- John Corker; -- Joe Felton; -- James Kmet; -- Reggie Mathis; -- Greg Orton; 62 Jon Roehlk	Wide Receivers/Linebackers: -- Brian Bergey; 88 Dwayne Dixon; -- Will McClay; Kickers: -- Novo Bojovic; Rookies in italics Roster updated March 11, 2013; 20 Active, 0 Inactive, 0 PS → More rosters

== Awards ==
Position	Player	Award	All-Arena team
Wide Receiver/Defensive Back	George LaFrance	Most Valuable Player	1st
Fullback/Linebacker	Lynn Bradford	none	1st
Offensive Line/Defensive Line	Reggie Mathis	none	1st
