= 1989 Pittsburgh Gladiators season =

Arena Football League team season

- Head coach: Joe Haering; Darrel Jackson
- Home stadium: Civic Arena

Results
- Record: 3–1
- Division place: 2nd
- Playoffs: L ArenaBowl III 26–39 vs. Detroit Drive

The 1989 season was the third for the Pittsburgh Gladiators franchise in the Arena Football League.

== Regular season ==
=== Schedule ===
Week	Date	Opponent	Results		Game site
Week	Date	Opponent	Final score	Team record	Game site
1	Bye				
2	July 14	Denver Dynamite	W 28–18	1–0	Civic Arena
3	July 22	Chicago Bruisers	W 47–38	2–0	Neutral Site
4	July 28	Detroit Drive	L 34–61	2–1	Neutral Site
5	August 5	at Maryland Commandos	W 50–30	3–1	Capital Centre

=== Standings ===
1989 Arena Football League standings
Team	W	L	T	PCT	PF	PA	PF (Avg.)	PA (Avg.)	STK
xy-Detroit Drive	3	1	0	.750	154	84	38.5	21	W 1
x-Pittsburgh Gladiators	3	1	0	.750	159	147	39.75	36.75	W 1
x-Denver Dynamite	3	1	0	.750	94	97	23.5	24.25	W 2
x-Chicago Bruisers	1	3	0	.250	167	155	41.75	38.75	L 1
Maryland Commandos	0	4	0	.000	79	170	19.75	42.5	L 4

y – clinched regular-season title

x – clinched playoff spot

== Playoffs ==
Round	Date	Opponent	Results		Game site
Round	Date	Opponent	Final score	Team record	Game site
Semi-finals	August 12	Denver Dynamite	W 39–37	1–0	Neutral Site
ArenaBowl III	August 18	at Detroit Drive	L 26–39	1–1	Joe Louis Arena

== Roster ==
1989 Pittsburgh Gladiators roster
Quarterbacks: -- Larry Barretta; -- Willie Totten; Wide Receivers/Defensive Backs: -- Joel Gueli; -- Jo Jo Heath; -- Thomas Monroe; -- Cornelius Ross; -- Alvin Williams	Running Backs/Linebackers: -- Aric Anderson; -- Fabray Collins; 44 Mike Powell; -- Alvin Ross; Offensive Linemen/Defensive Linemen: -- Cecil Fletcher; -- Rodney Garner; -- Kim Johnson; -- Donald Thompson	Wide Receivers/Linebackers: Currently Vacant; Kickers: 3 Rusty Fricke; Rookies in italics Roster updated March 11, 2013; 16 Active, 0 Inactive, 0 PS → More rosters

== Awards ==
Position	Player	Award	All-Arena team
Quarterback	Willie Totten	none	1st
Wide Receiver/Defensive Back	Alvin Williams	none	1st
