= 1989 Maryland Commandos season =

Arena Football League team season

- Head coach: Ray Willsey
- Home stadium: Capital Centre

Results
- Record: 0–4
- Division place: 5th
- Playoffs: did not qualify

The 1989 Maryland Commandos season was the second season for the Commandos. They finished with a record of 0–4.

== Regular season ==
=== Schedule ===
| Week | Date | Opponent | Results | | Game site |
| Week | Date | Opponent | Final score | Team record | Game site |
|---|---|---|---|---|---|
| 1 | July 8 | at Denver Dynamite | L 46–48 | 0–1 | Civic Arena |
| 2 | July 15 | Detroit Drive | L 7–39 | 0–2 | Baltimore Arena |
| 3 | Bye | | | | |
| 4 | July 29 | Chicago Bruisers | L 27–61 | 0–3 | Neutral Site |
| 5 | August 5 | Pittsburgh Gladiators | L 30–50 | 0–4 | Capital Centre |

=== Standings ===
1989 Arena Football League standings
| Team | W | L | T | PCT | PF | PA | PF (Avg.) | PA (Avg.) | STK |
|---|---|---|---|---|---|---|---|---|---|
| xy-Detroit Drive | 3 | 1 | 0 | .750 | 154 | 84 | 38.5 | 21 | W 1 |
| x-Pittsburgh Gladiators | 3 | 1 | 0 | .750 | 159 | 147 | 39.75 | 36.75 | W 1 |
| x-Denver Dynamite | 3 | 1 | 0 | .750 | 94 | 97 | 23.5 | 24.25 | W 2 |
| x-Chicago Bruisers | 1 | 3 | 0 | .250 | 167 | 155 | 41.75 | 38.75 | L 1 |
| Maryland Commandos | 0 | 4 | 0 | .000 | 79 | 170 | 19.75 | 42.5 | L 4 |

y – clinched regular-season title

x – clinched playoff spot

== Roster ==
1989 Maryland Commandos roster
| Quarterbacks: -- Mike Hold, Jr.; 7 Leon Reed; -- Paul Williams; Wide Receivers/Defensive Backs: -- Danny James; -- James Lott; -- Jim Rafferty; 17 Eric Rasheed | Running Backs/Linebackers: -- Darren Arbet; -- Charles Christian; -- Mickey Paige; -- Glenn Willis; Offensive Linemen/Defensive Linemen: -- Scott Camper; -- Gregory Harrell; -- Chuck Harris; -- Kim Johnson; -- Dan McDonald | Wide Receivers/Linebackers: -- Kerry Burt; -- Maurice Gravely; 20 Wade Lockett; Kickers: 3 Matt Frantz; Rookies in italics Roster updated March 12, 2013; 20 Active, 0 Inactive, 0 PS → More rosters |

== All-Arena team members ==
| Position | Player | All-Arena team |
|---|---|---|
| Offensive/Defensive Lineman | Chuck Harris | 1st |
