= Slowey =

Slowey is an Irish surname. Notable people with the surname include:

- Jane Slowey, British charity worker
- Jason Slowey (born 1989), American football player in the National Football League
- Kevin Slowey (born 1984), American baseball pitcher
- Patrick Slowey, builder of the historic Patrick Slowey House in Massachusetts
