= Tony Burris (American football) =

American football quarterback (born 1963)

Profile
- Position: Quarterback

Personal information
- Born: January 30, 1963 (age 63)
- Listed height: 6 ft 0 in (1.83 m)
- Listed weight: 185 lb (84 kg)

Career information
- High school: South Albany (Albany, Oregon)
- College: Western Oregon
- NFL draft: 1987: undrafted

Career history
- Edmonton Eskimos (1987)*; Detroit Drive (1989); Washington Commandos (1990)
- * Offseason or practice squad member only

Awards and highlights
- ArenaBowl champion (1989)

Career AFL statistics
- Comp. / Att.: 55 / 109
- Passing yards: 578
- TD–INT: 11–8
- QB rating: 60.88
- Stats at ArenaFan.com

Anthony Burris (born January 30, 1963) is an American former professional football player who was a quarterback in the Arena Football League (AFL) with the Detroit Drive and Washington Commandos. After redshirting at Oregon Tech and dropping out of Portland State, he played college football at Western Oregon State College. He was a two-time NAIA honorable mention All-American while at Western Oregon and signed with the Edmonton Eskimos of the Canadian Football League (CFL) after going undrafted in 1987. After playing for the Eskimos during the 1987 preseason, Burris joined the AFL in 1989. He was the starting quarterback for the Drive team that won ArenaBowl III. He was inducted into Western Oregon's athletics hall of fame in 2015.

== Early life ==
Anthony Burris was born on January 30, 1963. At the age of 10, his dad taught him how to spin a football. He played high school football at South Albany High School in Albany, Oregon, with his brothers Larry and Gary. Burris started on the varsity team during his sophomore, junior, and senior years. He earned first-team All-Valley League honors as a senior, and graduated in 1980. Burris also played baseball and basketball in high school.

== College career ==
After graduating high school, Burris redshirted one year at Oregon Tech after injuring his wrist. He then followed Oregon Tech head coach Don Read to Portland State. After sitting out one year due to NCAA transfer rules, (Note: NCAA rules stipulated that a player must sit out one year after transferring.) Burris spent spent two seasons at Portland State as a reserve. He then quit football and dropped out after his marriage ended.

Burris later enrolled at Western Oregon State College, where he was a two-year football letterman for the Wolves from 1985 to 1986. He played with his brother Larry at Western Oregon. Burris took over as starter after former Oregon State quarterback Ricky Greene suffered a season-ending knee injury in the 1985 opener. As a redshirt junior in 1985, Burris led the Wolves to an National Association of Intercollegiate Athletics (NAIA) playoff appearance and a 15–4 total record over his two seasons. Late in the 1986 season, he was named the NAIA offensive player of the week after setting single-game school records with 29 completions for 390 yards in a 44–0 victory over Lewis & Clark. He completed 56% of his passes for 4,791 yards and 47 touchdowns at Western Oregon. He was a two-time NAIA honorable mention All-American and also a two-time first-team All-College Football Association honoree. Burris majored in business at Western Oregon, and graduated in 1987. He was inducted into the school's athletics hall of fame as part of the class of 2015. As of 2015, his 4,791 career passing yards were still the second-most in school history even though he only played two years.

== Professional career ==
The Edmonton Eskimos director of player personnel, Frank Morris, became interested in Burris while watching Western Oregon game film in order to scout a different player. Upon hearing the news the Eskimos wanted to sign him, Burris blurted out "Hey, I'm going to be an Edmonton Oiler!" Burris went undrafted in the 1987 NFL draft, and signed a one-year contract with the Eskimos on April 15, 1987. He only appeared in one preseason game for the Eskimos, playing half of a quarter (five plays) while fumbling and throwing a pick-six. He was released by Edmonton on June 19, 1987, after the team signed Tracy Ham. Burris did not have an agent during his time in the CFL; Burris regretted this decision, stating, "I messed up by not having an agent."

Burris signed with the Detroit Drive of the Arena Football League (AFL) in 1989. He did not initially want to play in the AFL until his agent persuaded him. Burris played in all four regular season games for the Drive during the 1989 season, completing 18 of 29 passes (62.1%) for 205 yards and four touchdowns with no interceptions as the backup to Mike Trigg. Trigg was then benched in favor of Burris for the postseason. Burris started the team's first playoff game against the Chicago Bruisers, throwing for three touchdowns as the Drive won 43–10. Burris started the team's next game: ArenaBowl III against the Pittsburgh Gladiators. In the ArenaBowl, he completed 12 of 26 passes for 176 yards and two touchdowns as Detroit won by a score of 39–26. Burris earned $1,500 per game, including expenses, during his time with the Drive. After the 1989 AFL season, Burris played in two exhibition games for the Drive in Europe: one in Paris and one in London.

Burris began the 1990 AFL season as the starting quarterback for the Maryland Commandos but was benched for Mike Rhodes during the second game. Burris still managed to play in all eight games for Washington during the 1990 season, completing 37 of 80 passes (46.2%) for 373 yards, seven touchdowns, and eight interceptions as the team finished 2–6.

== Personal life ==
Burris later started a construction business named Red Zone Construction, whose name is in reference to the football term of "red zone". He has four children.
