= Jim Thompson (Oregon politician) =

American politician

Member of the Oregon House of Representatives from the 23rd district
- In office January 2009 – January 2015
- Preceded by: Brian Boquist
- Succeeded by: Mike Nearman

Member of the Oregon House of Representatives from the 23rd district
- In office 2004 – January 2005
- Preceded by: Lane Shetterly
- Succeeded by: Brian Boquist

Personal details
- Born: Lincoln County, Oregon
- Party: Independent Party of Oregon
- Education: Western Oregon University; Oregon State University
- Website: jimforhouse.com

Jim Thompson (born in Lincoln County, Oregon) is an American politician and a former Republican member of the Oregon House of Representatives representing District 23 from 2009 to 2015. Thompson served non-consecutively in the seat from his appointment in 2004 to fill the vacancy caused by the resignation of Lane Shetterly until January 2005. In September 2015, Thompson registered with the Independent Party of Oregon to run again for District 23.

== Education ==
Thompson attended Western Oregon University and Oregon State University.

== Elections ==
- 2004 Thompson ran in the five-way May 18, 2004 Republican Primary but took second to Brian Boquist, Boquist won the three-way November 2, 2004 General election and served in the seat until 2009.
- 2008 When Republican Representative Boquist ran for Oregon Senate and left the District 23 seat open, Thompson won the May 20, 2008 Republican Primary with 4,137 votes (61.4%), and won the November 4, 2008 General election with 15,878 votes (57.4%) against Democratic nominee Jason Brown, who had run for the seat in 2006.
- 2010 Thompson was unopposed for the May 18, 2010, Republican primary, winning with 5,387 votes, and won the November 2, 2010 General election with 16,371 votes (68.0%) against Democratic nominee Wesley West, who had lost the 2008 Democratic Primary to Jason Brown.
- 2012 Thompson was unopposed for the May 15, 2012, Republican primary, winning with 5,039 votes, and won the three-way November 6, 2012 General election with 17,864 votes (59.1%) against Democratic nominee Ross Swartzendruber and Pacific Green Party candidate Alex Polikoff.
- 2014 Thompson was defeated in the May 20, 2014, Republican primary, losing to Mike Nearman, a software engineer from Independence. The Oregonian identified the incumbent's defeat as an example of a more conservative Republican challenger ousting a relative moderate, noting Thompson's support for same-sex marriage as an issue that inflamed conservatives.

== Electoral history ==
2008 Oregon State Representative, 23rd district
Party	Candidate	Votes	%
Republican	Jim Thompson	15,878	57.4
Democratic	Jason Brown	11,745	42.4
Write-in		56	0.2
Total votes		27,679	100%

2010 Oregon State Representative, 23rd district
Party	Candidate	Votes	%
Republican	Jim Thompson	16,371	68.0
Democratic	Wesley W West	7,661	31.8
Write-in		42	0.2
Total votes		24,074	100%

2012 Oregon State Representative, 23rd district
Party	Candidate	Votes	%
Republican	Jim Thompson	17,864	59.1
Democratic	Ross Swartzendruber	9,937	32.9
Pacific Green	Alex Polikoff	2,381	7.9
Write-in		43	0.1
Total votes		30,225	100%

2016 Oregon State Representative, 23rd district
Party	Candidate	Votes	%
Republican	Mike Nearman	17,563	52.8
Independent	Jim Thompson	12,370	37.2
Pacific Green	Alex Polikoff	1,906	5.7
Libertarian	Garrett Leeds	1,395	4.2
Write-in		53	0.2
Total votes		33,287	100%
