= List of Western Oregon Wolves in the NFL draft =

This is a list of Western Oregon Wolves players in the NFL draft.

== Key ==
B	Back	K	Kicker	NT	Nose tackle
C	Center	LB	Linebacker	FB	Fullback
DB	Defensive back	P	Punter	HB	Halfback
DE	Defensive end	QB	Quarterback	WR	Wide receiver
DT	Defensive tackle	RB	Running back	G	Guard
E	End	T	Offensive tackle	TE	Tight end

= Pro Bowler
= Hall of Famer

== Selections ==
Year	Round	Pick	Overall	Player	Team	Position
2001	7	25	225	Brian Crawford	Minnesota Vikings	OT
2007	5	16	153	Kevin Boss	New York Giants	TE
2012	6	29	199	Jason Slowey	San Francisco 49ers	C
