= Alvin Ross =

American football player

No. 41
- Position: Running back

Personal information
- Born: May 3, 1963 (age 63); Chicago, Illinois, U.S.
- Listed height: 5 ft 11 in (1.80 m)
- Listed weight: 235 lb (107 kg)

Career information
- College: Central Oklahoma
- NFL draft: 1987: undrafted

Career history
- Tampa Bay Buccaneers (1987)*; Philadelphia Eagles (1987); New York Jets (1988)*; Pittsburgh Gladiators (1989)
- * Offseason or practice squad member only
- Stats at Pro Football Reference
- Stats at ArenaFan.com

Alvin Ross (born May 3, 1963) is a former football player in the United States. He was a running back for Barry Switzer's University of Oklahoma Sooners and for a season with the Philadelphia Eagles. He had 54 yards and a touchdown on 14 carries for the Eagles in 1987.

Ross attended West Aurora High School in Aurora, Illinois. His short professional career included a stint for the Pittsburgh Gladiators.

He had five touchdowns at Oklahoma in 1981 as a freshman. He transferred to Central State University in 1985, but was ruled ineligible before the start of the season because he and other University of Oklahoma players, including Buster Rhymes, were alleged to have taken money from an agent. In 1986, Ross was allowed to rejoin the team after a court order.

== See also ==
- 1989 Pittsburgh Gladiators season
