= Steve Griffin =

American football player (born 1964)

No. 86, 22, 26
- Position: Wide receiver

Personal information
- Born: December 24, 1964 (age 61); Miami, Florida, U.S.
- Listed height: 5 ft 11 in (1.80 m)
- Listed weight: 198 lb (90 kg)

Career information
- High school: Norland (Miami Gardens, Florida)
- College: Purdue (1982–1985)
- NFL draft: 1986: 12th round, 308th overall pick

Career history
- Atlanta Falcons (1986)*; Washington Commandos (1987); Atlanta Falcons (1987); Detroit Drive (1988–1990); Columbus Thunderbolts (1991)
- * Offseason or practice squad member only

Awards and highlights
- 3× ArenaBowl champion (1988, 1989, 1990); ArenaBowl MVP (1988)
- Stats at Pro Football Reference
- Stats at ArenaFan.com

Steven Leroy Griffin (born December 24, 1964) is an American former professional football player who was a wide receiver for one season with the Atlanta Falcons of the National Football League (NFL). He was selected by the Falcons in the 12th round of the 1986 NFL draft after playing college football at Purdue University. He also played for the Washington Commandos, Detroit Drive and Columbus Thunderbolts of the Arena Football League (AFL).

== Early life and college ==
Steven Leroy Griffin was born on December 24, 1964, in Miami, Florida. He attended Miami Norland High School in Miami Gardens, Florida.

Griffin was a member of the Purdue Boilermakers of Purdue University from 1982 to 1985. He caught 20 passes for 287 yards and one touchdown as a freshman in 1982 while also returning eight kicks for 175 yards and five punts for 91 yards and one touchdown. In 1983, he recorded 24 receptions for 270 yards and 11 punt returns for 50 yards. During the 1984 season, Griffin totaled 60 catches for 991 yards and four touchdowns, 12 punt returns for 69 yards and three kick returns for 66 yards. As a senior in 1985, he caught 38 passes for 617 yards and six touchdowns while returning 17 punts for 134 yards and three kicks for 80 yards. He wore jersey number 2 while at Purdue. In 2018, the Journal & Courier named Griffin the best No. 2 in Purdue football history.

== Professional career ==
Griffin was selected by the Atlanta Falcons in the 12th round, with the 308th overall pick, of the 1986 NFL draft. He officially signed with the team on July 12 but was released on August 19, 1986.

Griffin played in all six games for the Washington Commandos of the Arena Football League (AFL) during the league's inaugural 1987 season, catching 22 passes for 242 yards and four touchdowns while also posting one solo tackle. He was a wide receiver/defensive back during his time in the AFL as the league played under ironman rules.

On September 23, 1987, Griffin signed with the Falcons during the 1987 NFL players strike. He played in two games for the Falcons before being released on October 19, 1987, after the strike ended.

Griffin appeared in all 12 games for the Detroit Drive of the AFL in 1988, recording 48 receptions for 485 yards and six touchdowns, 21 solo tackles, 15 assisted tackles, one interception for six yards and a touchdown, seven pass breakups, and 18 kick returns for 313 yards and one touchdown. The Drive finished the 1988 season with a 9–3 record. On July 30, 1988, Detroit won ArenaBowl II against the Chicago Bruisers by score of 24–13. Griffin was named ArenaBowl MVP after totaling six receptions for 52 yards, two interceptions for 58 yards, two pass breakups, two fumble recoveries, and one kick return for 15 yards. He only appeared in one game in 1989, posting one solo tackle and one assisted tackle. The Drive finished the year 3–1 and won ArenaBowl III against the Pittsburgh Gladiators. Griffin played in all eight games for Detroit in 1990, accumulating 21 catches for 243 yards and five touchdowns, 19 solo tackles, five assisted tackles, two interceptions, two pass breakups, one forced fumble, and one fumble recovery. The Drive finihsed the 1990 season 6–2 and won the ArenaBowl for the third consecutive year.

Griffin played in all ten games for the Columbus Thunderbolts of the AFL in 1991, recording 24 receptions for 293 yards and one touchdown, 13 solo tackles, one assisted tackle, one interception, two pass breakups, one fumble recovery, and 13 kick returns for 166 yards. The Thunderbolts finished the 1991 season with an 0–10 record.
