= Leon Reed =

American football player (born 1967)

Profile
- Position: Quarterback

Personal information
- Born: January 22, 1967 (age 59)
- Listed height: 5 ft 11 in (1.80 m)
- Listed weight: 180 lb (82 kg)

Career information
- High school: Senatobia (Senatobia, Mississippi)
- College: Northwest Mississippi JC (1985–1986); Tennessee–Martin (1987–1988)
- NFL draft: 1989: undrafted

Career history
- Winnipeg Blue Bombers (1989)*; Maryland Commandos (1989); Denver Dynamite (1990)
- * Offseason or practice squad member only

Awards and highlights
- GSC Offensive Player of the Year (1988); First-team All-GSC (1988); Second-team All-GSC (1987)

Career AFL statistics
- Comp. / Att.: 16 / 37
- Passing yards: 180
- TD–INT: 3–2
- Passer rating: 56.14
- Stats at ArenaFan.com

Leon Reed (born January 22, 1967) is an American former professional football quarterback who played two seasons in the Arena Football League (AFL) with the Maryland Commandos and Denver Dynamite. He played college football at Northwest Mississippi Junior College and the University of Tennessee at Martin.

== Early life ==
Leon Reed was born on January 22, 1967. He played high school football at Senatobia High School in Senatobia, Mississippi. He earned first-team all-conference honors his senior year in 1984.

== College career ==
Reed first played college football at Northwest Mississippi Junior College from 1985 to 1986. He threw for 1,234 yards and 16 touchdowns as a freshman in 1985. He was named first-team all-state in 1986.

Reed then transferred to play for the Tennessee–Martin Pacers of the University of Tennessee at Martin, where he was a two-year letterman from 1987 to 1988. Despite only starting the final six games of the 1987 season, Reed broke the school record for total offense with 2,106 yards and earned second-team All-Gulf South Conference (GSC) honors. In 1988, he garnered GSC Offensive Player of the Year and first-team All-GSC recognition. During his college career, Reed completed 402 of 697 passes for 4,842 yards and 30 touchdowns while also rushing for 12 touchdowns. He had 5,333 yards of total offense. He wore jersey number 1 while at Tennessee–Martin. Reed was inducted into the school's athletics hall of fame in 1997.

== Professional career ==
On April 4, 1989, it was reported that the Winnipeg Blue Bombers of the Canadian Football League (CFL) had made a contract offer to Reed. Later that month, Reed went undrafted in the 1989 NFL draft. He signed with the Blue Bombers on June 1, 1989. He was released on July 1, signed to the practice roster on July 15, and released again on July 19.

Reed then signed with the Maryland Commandos of the Arena Football League (AFL). He started the final game of the 1989 season for the Commandos. Overall, he played in two games, starting one, in 1989, completing 16 of 37 passes (43.2%) for 180 yards, three touchdowns, and two interceptions while also rushing ten times for 21 yards.

Reed played in one game for the Denver Dynamite of the AFL in 1990 but did not record any statistics.
