= Mike Nearman =

American politician (born 1963 or 1964)

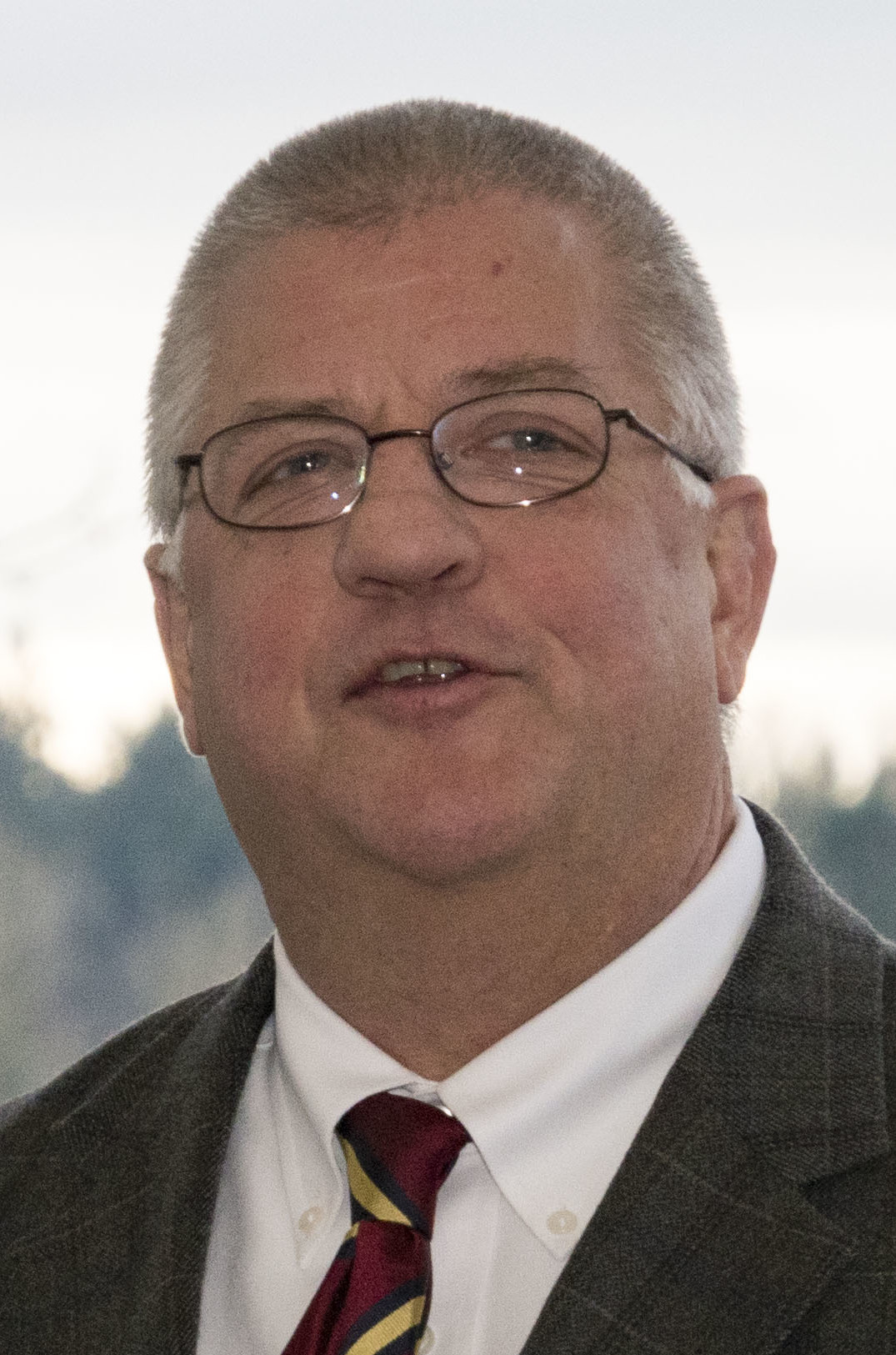
- Nearman in 2017

Member of the Oregon House of Representatives from the 23rd district
- In office January 12, 2015 – June 10, 2021
- Preceded by: Jim Thompson
- Succeeded by: Anna Scharf

Personal details
- Born: 1963 or 1964 (age 61–62)
- Party: Republican
- Spouse: Debra Nearman
- Education: Marquette University (BA); Western Oregon University (BS)
- Mike Nearman's voice Nerman being interviewed by Bruce Broussard; Recorded January 26, 2016

Michael J. Nearman (born 1963 or 1964) is an American politician who served as a member of the Oregon House of Representatives from the 23rd district from 2015 until 2021, when he was expelled from the house for his role in the December 2020 Oregon State Capitol breach.

== Early life and career ==
Born and raised in Oregon, Nearman graduated from Jesuit High School in Beaverton. Nearman earned a Bachelor of Arts degree in philosophy from Marquette University before returning to Oregon to work for his family's furniture business. Years later, Nearman earned a Bachelor of Science degree in computer science from Western Oregon University.

From 2010 to 2015, Nearman worked as a software engineer for UTC Climate, Controls & Security.

== Oregon House of Representatives ==
Nearman was elected to the Oregon House of Representatives in 2014 after defeating incumbent Representative Jim Thompson in the Republican primary election. The Oregonian reported that Nearman was buoyed by conservative opposition to Thompson's more progressive stances on social issues such as same-sex marriage and abortion rights.

Nearman was one of two petitioners who filed ballot measure IP 5, which would have required all Oregonians to re-register in order to vote, and to show a state official a birth certificate, passport, or other documentation in order to register.

On December 11, 2020, Nearman and 11 other state Republican officials signed a letter requesting Oregon Attorney General Ellen Rosenblum join Texas and other states contesting the results of the 2020 presidential election in Texas v. Pennsylvania. Rosenblum announced she had filed on behalf of the defense, and against Texas, the day prior.

=== 2020 Oregon Capitol breach ===
During a special session on December 21, 2020, Nearman let armed protesters into the Oregon State Capitol to protest against health restrictions related to the COVID-19 pandemic in Oregon. Joey Gibson, political activist and founder of Patriot Prayer, posted a video on Parler indicating a state representative let the group into the capitol, and in January 2021 security video was released of Nearman allowing similar right-wing protesters to enter the Oregon State Capitol Building through a door.

Oregon House Speaker Tina Kotek fined Nearman $2,000 and stripped him of his committee assignments and appointments. Kotek also asked him to resign. Kotek and others filed a formal complaint about Nearman's actions creating a hostile workplace. Nearman also gave up his Capitol building badge; he agreed not to let unauthorized people into the building and was required to give 24 hours notice before entering the building. Oregon State Police opened a criminal investigation against him.

On April 30, 2021, prosecutors charged Nearman with official misconduct in the first degree (Class A misdemeanor, punishable by a maximum 364 days in prison and a US$6,250 fine) and criminal trespass in the second degree (Class C misdemeanor, punishable by a maximum of 30 days in jail and a $1,250 fine). Nearman did not appear in court on May 11 when he was arraigned on the charges, and his attorney did not file a plea. Nearman must appear in court in person or remotely for a June 29 hearing.

In June 2021, video was discovered of a meeting at the office of the Freedom Foundation on December 16, 2020, during which Nearman detailed his plan to allow protestors entry to the capitol, which he dubbed "Operation Hall Pass". He gave out a cell phone number, which was his, and said if they text to that "random number" that they are at the West entrance, somebody may open the door on their way out.

On July 27, 2021, Nearman pleaded guilty to one count of official misconduct in the first degree as part of a plea agreement. In exchange for his guilty plea, Nearman received 18 months of probation, and must complete 80 hours of community service during his probation. Furthermore, he will have to pay $2,700 in fines for damages done to the Capitol during the riot, and is also banned from the Capitol building and its grounds.

==== Expulsion ====
On June 10, 2021, the Oregon House of Representatives voted 59–1 to expel Nearman on the grounds of "disorderly behavior"; the sole vote against was cast by Nearman himself. He is the first member to be expelled in the state's history.

== Electoral history ==
2014 Oregon State Representative, 23rd district
Party	Candidate	Votes	%
Republican	Mike Nearman	14,474	52.8
Democratic	Wanda Davis	9,891	36.1
Pacific Green	Alex Polikoff	1,271	4.6
Write-in		1,116	4.1
Libertarian	Mark Karnowski	679	2.5
Total votes		27,431	100%

2016 Oregon State Representative, 23rd district
Party	Candidate	Votes	%
Republican	Mike Nearman	17,563	52.8
Independent	Jim Thompson	12,370	37.2
Pacific Green	Alex Polikoff	1,906	5.7
Libertarian	Garrett Leeds	1,395	4.2
Write-in		53	0.2
Total votes		33,287	100%

2018 Oregon State Representative, 23rd district
Party	Candidate	Votes	%
Republican	Mike Nearman	17,971	54.4
Democratic	Danny Jaffer	14,317	43.3
Libertarian	Mark Karnowski	738	2.2
Write-in		37	0.1
Total votes		33,063	100%

2020 Oregon State Representative, 23rd district
Party	Candidate	Votes	%
Republican	Mike Nearman	23,884	58.3
Democratic	Sean K Scorvo	14,292	34.9
Pacific Green	Alex Polikoff	1,770	4.3
Libertarian	Scott D Clawson	963	2.4
Write-in		37	0.1
Total votes		40,946	100%
