= Fi-linx =

fi-linx
- Company type: CUSO
- Industry: Financial services
- Founded: Salem, Oregon, U.S. (2006)
- Headquarters: Salem, Oregon, U.S.
- Area served: The Credit Union industry
- Key people: Robbie Wright, General Manager
- Products: Deposit Reclassification; Check Checker
- Owner: Maps Service Agency
- Parent: Maps Credit Union

fi-linx (intentionally lower-case) is a credit union service organization owned by Maps Service Agency, a subsidiary of Maps Credit Union, and headquartered in Salem, Oregon. A financial software development company, fi-linx products are specifically marketed to credit unions. Their services are offered both directly and through the Credit Union Executives Society (CUES).

== History ==
fi-linx was founded by a group of Maps Credit Union employees in Autumn 2006. After trying unsuccessfully to find Deposit Reclassification software that met the needs of the credit union, fi-linx was formed to create its own software, using in-house software developers.

== Products and services ==
fi-linx offers two credit union technology services: Deposit Reclassification and Check Checker.

Deposit Reclassification, the primary service provided by fi-linx, provides an automated method for credit unions to reclassify their deposit accounts to significantly lower their Federal Reserve balance. This is done by splitting each transaction account into a checking subaccount (which carries a reserve requirement) and a savings subaccount (which does not carry a reserve requirement), a process allowed by the Federal Reserve Bank in 1993. The service has been reported to have saved Maps Credit Union $145,000 per year and it is estimated that $154 million could be saved industry-wide if every credit union were to use the service. Check Checker is a form of check fraud deterrent software that uses real-time validation to check the routing number of a check with the Federal Reserve, as well as checking fraud alerts from the National Credit Union Administration and Federal Deposit Insurance Corporation.

== Competition ==
Both deposit reclassification and check fraud deterrent software are offered by other organizations. For example, although not specifically marketing to credit unions, Ceto and Associates also offers deposit reclassification services, with over 1500 clients in all 50 states.
