= 1989 Denver Dynamite season =

Arena Football League team season

- Owner: Gary Graham
- Head coach: Babe Parilli
- Home stadium: McNichols Sports Arena

Results
- Record: 3–1
- Division place: 3rd
- Playoffs: Lost semi-finals (Gladiators) 37–39

The 1989 Denver Dynamite season was the second season for the Denver Dynamite. The franchise was restarted in 1989 after sitting out the 1988 season, with the ownership purchased by Englewood, Colorado investment banker, Gary Graham for $125,000. Graham's first move was to hire former NFL and AFL coach Babe Parilli as the team's head coach. The team struggled to earn money during the 1989 season due to only hosting one home game. The team finished with a 3–1 regular season record, and lost in the first round of the playoffs, 37–39 to the Gladiators.

== Regular season ==
=== Schedule ===
Week	Date	Opponent	Results		Game site
Week	Date	Opponent	Final score	Team record	Game site
1	July 8	Maryland Commandos	W 20–15	1–0	McNichols Sports Arena
2	July 14	at Pittsburgh Gladiators	L 18–28	1–1	Civic Arena
3	July 21	at Detroit Drive	W 15–14	2–1	Joe Louis Arena
4	Bye				
5	August 4	Chicago Bruisers	W 41–40	3–1	Neutral Site

=== Standings ===
1989 Arena Football League standings
Team	W	L	T	PCT	PF	PA	PF (Avg.)	PA (Avg.)	STK
xy-Detroit Drive	3	1	0	.750	154	84	38.5	21	W 1
x-Pittsburgh Gladiators	3	1	0	.750	159	147	39.75	36.75	W 1
x-Denver Dynamite	3	1	0	.750	94	97	23.5	24.25	W 2
x-Chicago Bruisers	1	3	0	.250	167	155	41.75	38.75	L 1
Maryland Commandos	0	4	0	.000	79	170	19.75	42.5	L 4

y – clinched regular-season title

x – clinched playoff spot

== Playoffs ==
Round	Date	Opponent	Results		Game site
Round	Date	Opponent	Final score	Team record	Game site
Semi-Finals	August 12	Pittsburgh Gladiators	L 37–39	0–1	Neutral Site

== Roster ==
1989 Denver Dynamite roster
Quarterbacks: -- Mike Rhodes; 17 Harold Smith; Wide receivers/Defensive backs: 32 Frank Bianchini; 27 Wayne Coffey; -- William Cotman; 26 David Hendley; 1 Ron Shegog; 44 Bart Schuchts	Running backs/Linebackers: 33 Fred Stone; Offensive linemen/Defensive linemen: -- Glenn Haisley; 77 Walter Housman; 65 Quinton Knight; -- John Reed; 82 Keith Smith; -- Joe Williams	Wide receivers/Linebackers: -- Fred Gayles; -- Troy Long; Kickers: 3 Gary Gussman; Rookies in italics Roster updated March 11, 2013; 18 Active, 0 Inactive, 0 PS → More rosters

== Awards ==
Position	Player	Award	All-Arena team
Head coach	Babe Parilli	Coach of the Year	–
Offensive/Defensive lineman	Quinton Knight	none	1st
Kicker	Gary Gussman	none	1st
