= Lane Shetterly =

American lawyer and politician from Oregon

Director of Oregon Department of Land Conservation and Development
- In office 2004 – August 2007
- Governor: Ted Kulongoski

Member of the Oregon House of Representatives from the 34th, 23rd district
- In office January 13, 1997 – resign date in 2004
- Preceded by: John Schoon
- Succeeded by: Jim Thompson

Personal details
- Born: Dallas, Oregon
- Party: Republican Party of Oregon
- Spouse: Francine
- Children: Joel, Lauren
- Profession: Lawyer
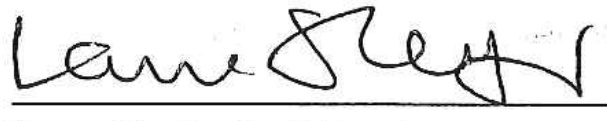
- Signature

Lane Shetterly is an American politician and a former Republican member of the Oregon House of Representatives for four terms. He served as Speaker pro tempore from 2001 until his resignation to accept an appointment to become DLCD director. He has also worked as Dallas city attorney.

== Life ==
Shetterly was born in Dallas and graduated from Western Oregon University in 1977 with a BS in Education, and from Northwestern School of Law of Lewis & Clark College in 1981. He began a law practice in 1981, and returned in 2007. He retired in 2025.

== Awards ==
- Board member, Dallas Community Foundation
- Board chair, Oregon Community Foundation
- Advisory committee member, Oregon Symphony
- Vice president, Polk County community development corporation
- Chair, Oregon Law Commission
- Henry and Helen Graven Award
