= Kareem Orr =

American football player (born 1997)

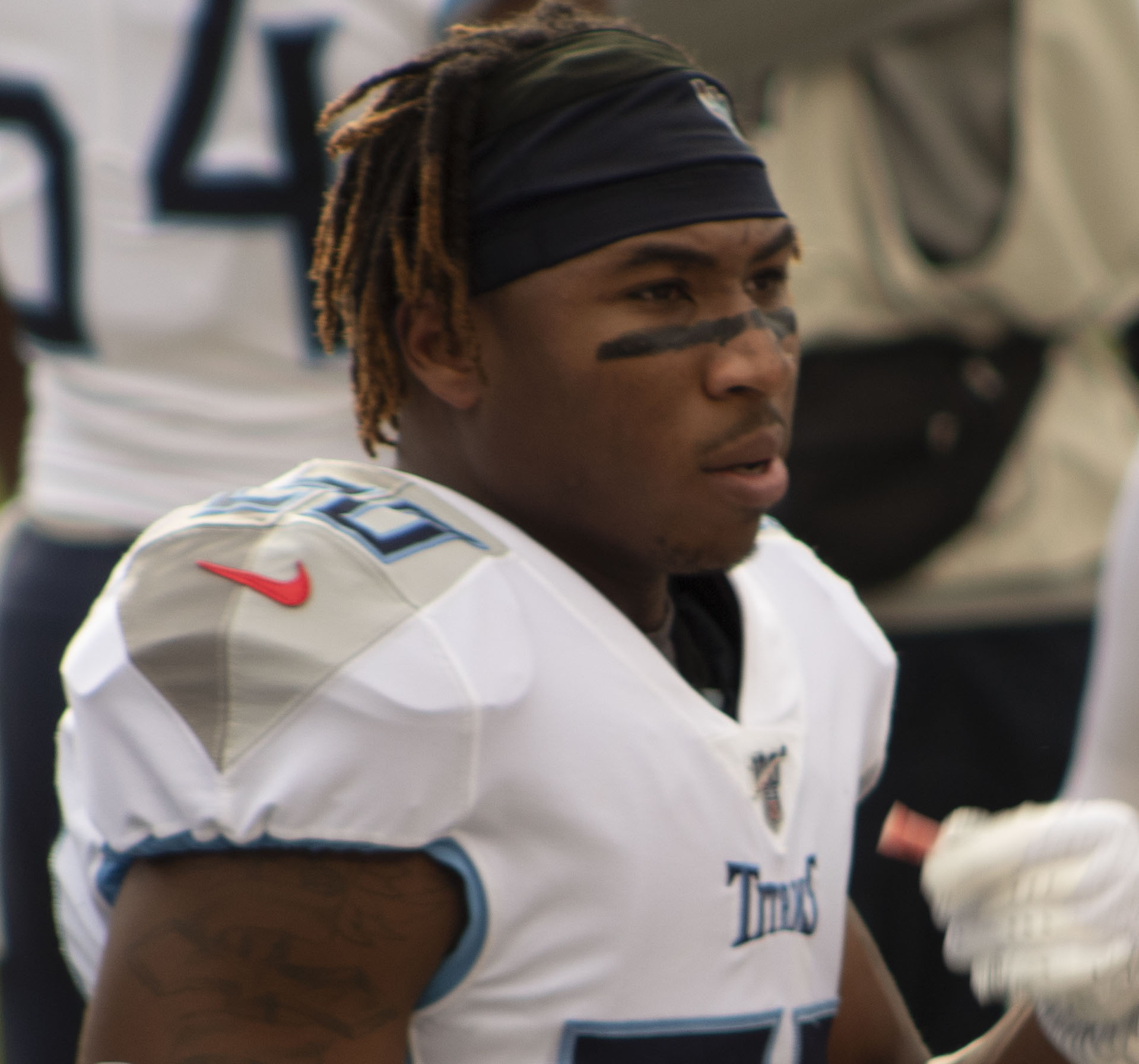
- Orr with the Tennessee Titans in 2019

Profile
- Position: Cornerback

Personal information
- Born: January 2, 1997 (age 29); Chattanooga, Tennessee
- Listed height: 5 ft 11 in (1.80 m)
- Listed weight: 195 lb (88 kg)

Career information
- High school: Notre Dame (Chattanooga, TN)
- College: Chattanooga
- NFL draft: 2019: undrafted

Career history
- Tennessee Titans (2019–2020); Los Angeles Rams (2021); Seattle Sea Dragons (2023)*
- * Offseason or practice squad member only

Awards and highlights
- Super Bowl champion (LVI)

Career NFL statistics
- Total tackles: 20
- Fumble recoveries: 1
- Stats at Pro Football Reference

Kareem Orr (born January 2, 1997) is an American professional football cornerback. He played college football at Arizona State and Chattanooga.

== Professional career ==
=== Tennessee Titans ===
Orr was signed by the Tennessee Titans as an undrafted free agent on May 13, 2019. He was waived on August 31, 2019 and was signed to the practice squad the next day. He was promoted to the active roster on October 26, 2019, but was waived two days later and re-signed back to the practice squad. He was promoted to the active roster again on November 26, 2019. He was waived on December 14, 2019 and re-signed to the practice squad. He signed a reserve/future contract with the Titans on January 20, 2020.

On September 5, 2020, Orr was waived by the Titans and signed to the practice squad the next day. He was elevated to the active roster on October 13 and October 17 for the team's weeks 5 and 6 games against the Buffalo Bills and Houston Texans, and reverted to the practice squad after each game. He was signed to the active roster on October 31. He was placed on injured reserve on November 21, 2020. He was activated on December 12, 2020. On May 6, 2021, Orr was waived by the Titans.

=== Los Angeles Rams ===
On May 26, 2021, Orr signed with the Los Angeles Rams. He was waived on August 31, 2021 and re-signed to the practice squad the next day. Orr won Super Bowl LVI when the Rams defeated the Cincinnati Bengals.

On February 15, 2022, Orr signed a reserve/future contract with the Rams. On April 16, 2022, the Rams waived Orr.

=== Seattle Sea Dragons ===
On November 17, 2022, Orr was drafted by the Seattle Sea Dragons of the XFL.
