= Reggie Mathis =

American football player (born 1956)

No. 56, 43, 50
- Position: Linebacker

Personal information
- Born: March 18, 1956 (age 70); Chattanooga, Tennessee, U.S.
- Listed height: 6 ft 2 in (1.88 m)
- Listed weight: 220 lb (100 kg)

Career information
- High school: Notre Dame (Chattanooga)
- College: Navarro (1974); Oklahoma (1975–1978)
- NFL draft: 1979: 2nd round, 38th overall pick

Career history
- New Orleans Saints (1979–1981); New Jersey Generals (1983); San Antonio Gunslingers (1985); Hamilton Tiger-Cats (1985); Detroit Drive (1988–1990)

Awards and highlights
- 3× ArenaBowl champion (1988–1990); First-team All-Arena (1989); First-team All-Big Eight (1978)
- Stats at Pro Football Reference
- Stats at ArenaFan.com

Reginald Levi Mathis (born March 18, 1956) is an American former professional football linebacker who played two seasons with the New Orleans Saints of the National Football League (NFL). He was selected by the Saints in the second round of the 1979 NFL draft. He played college football at Navarro College and the University of Oklahoma. Mathis was also a member of the New Jersey Generals and San Antonio Gunslingers of the United States Football League (USFL), the Hamilton Tiger-Cats of the Canadian Football League (CFL), and the Detroit Drive of the Arena Football League (AFL).

== Early life and college ==
Reginald Levi Mathis was born on March 18, 1956, in Chattanooga, Tennessee. He attended Notre Dame High School in Chattanooga, Tennessee.

Mathis was recruited by Bobby Proctor to play college football for the Oklahoma Sooners of the University of Oklahoma. However, he did not qualify academically and had to play his first season at Navarro College in 1974. He then transferred to Oklahoma. He redshirted the 1975 season and was a three-year letterman from 1976 to 1978. Mathis spent time at both split end and tight end at Oklahoma before converting to defensive end in 1977. In 1976, he caught three passes for 41 yards and returned one kick for four yards. He returned one interception for 17 yards his senior year in 1978 and earned Associated Press first-team All-Big Eight Conference honors.

== Professional career ==
Mathis was selected by the New Orleans Saints in the second round, with the 38th overall pick, of the 1979 NFL draft. He played in all 16 games for the Saints during his rookie year in 1979. He started all 16 games in 1980, intercepting one pass for 15 yards, as the Saints finished the year with a 1–15 record. Mathis was placed on injured reserve the next year on August 31, 1981, and missed the entire season. He was released by the Saints on June 24, 1982.

Mathis signed with the New Jersey Generals of the United States Football League (USFL) on November 3, 1982. He retired on March 25, 1983.

On January 18, 1985, Mathis was traded to the San Antonio Gunslingers. He played for the Gunslingers during the 1985 season, returning one kickoff for 24 yards. He was released in 1985.

In late July 1985, Mathis signed a 21-day trial with the Hamilton Tiger-Cats of the Canadian Football League. On August 10, it was reported he had been activated off of the 21-day trial. Overall, Mathis played in five games for the Tiger-Cats in 1985 and recovered one fumble for 19 yards. He signed a three-year contract with the Tiger-Cats in April 1986. He was released during final roster cuts in June 1986.

Mathis signed with the Detroit Drive of the Arena Football League (AFL) in 1988. He was an offensive lineman/defensive lineman during his time in the AFL as the league player under ironman rules. He played in seven games for the Drive during the 1988 season, totaling seven solo tackles, one assisted tackle, two sacks, one fumble recovery, and one blocked kick. The Drive finished the season with a 9–3 record, and won ArenaBowl II against the Chicago Bruisers by a score of 24–13. Mathis appeared in all four games for the Drive in 1989, recording six solo tackles, two assisted tackles, seven sacks, one forced fumble, and one pass breakup. The team finished the year with a 3–1 record and beat the Pittsburgh Gladiators in ArenaBowl III by a score of 39–26. Mathis was named first-team All-Arena for his performance during the 1989 season. He played in two games in 1990, totaling four solo tackles, one assisted tackle, one sack, and one blocked kick. The Drive won ArenaBowl IV against the Dallas Texans 51–27.

== Post-playing career ==
Mathis coached in the Arena Football League and the National Indoor Football League after his playing career. In 2006, he graduated from Oklahoma.
