= Brian Greene (American football) =

American football player (born 1972)

No. 30
- Position: Wide receiver / Defensive back

Personal information
- Born: February 15, 1972 (age 54)
- Listed height: 5 ft 11 in (1.80 m)
- Listed weight: 185 lb (84 kg)

Career information
- High school: Redmond (Redmond, Oregon)
- College: Western Oregon State (1990–1993)
- NFL draft: 1994: undrafted

Career history
- Sacramento Gold Miners (1994)*; Charlotte Rage (1996); Portland Forest Dragons/Oklahoma Wranglers (1997–2000); Los Angeles Avengers (2001)
- * Offseason or practice squad member only

Awards and highlights
- Second-team All-Arena (1998)

Career AFL statistics
- Receptions: 135
- Receiving yards: 1,877
- Receiving TDs: 26
- Tackles: 109
- Interceptions: 6
- Stats at ArenaFan.com

Brian Greene (born February 15, 1972) is an American former professional football player who played six seasons in the Arena Football League (AFL) with the Charlotte Rage, Portland Forest Dragons/Oklahoma Wranglers and Los Angeles Avengers. He played college football at Western Oregon State College.

== Early life and college ==
Brian Greene was born on February 15, 1972. He attended Redmond High School in Redmond, Oregon.

Greene played college football for the Western Oregon State Wolves of Western Oregon State College as a defensive back, and was a four-year letterman from 1990 to 1993. He was inducted into the Western Oregon Football Hall of Fame in 2024.

== Professional career ==
Greene went undrafted in the 1994 NFL draft. He signed with the Sacramento Gold Miners of the Canadian Football League in 1994 but was later released.

Greene played in ten games for the Charlotte Rage of the Arena Football League (AFL) in 1996, recording 18 receptions for 173 yards and three touchdowns, 20 solo tackles, seven assisted tackles, two interceptions, and one pass breakup. He was a wide receiver/defensive back during his time in the AFL as the league played under ironman rules.

Greene appeared in all 14 games for the Portland Forest Dragons of the AFL in 1997, totaling 31 catches for 488 yards and three touchdowns, 24 solo tackles, 12 assisted tackles, four pass breakups, one fumble recovery, and 20 kick returns for 374 yards. Portland finished the 1998 season with a 2–12 record. Greene played in all 14 games for the second straight season in 1998, accumulating 48 receptions for 764 yards and 15 touchdowns, 35 solo tackles, 16 assisted tackles, three interceptions for 61 yards and one touchdown, seven pass breakups, and 13 kick returns for 207 yards. The Forest Dragons finished the year 4–10. Greene was named second-team All-Arena for his performance during the 1998 season. He appeared in two games in 1999, catching three passes for 29 yards and rushing three times for 30 yards and one touchdown while also posting four solo tackles, two assisted tackles, and one pass breakup. The Forest Dragons moved after the 1999 season and became the Oklahoma Wranglers. Greene played in ten games for the Wranglers in 2000, recording 32 receptions for 396 yards and five touchdowns, six solo tackles, and one interception.

Greene signed with the Los Angeles Avengers of the AFL on December 15, 2000. He was placed on refuse to report on March 19, 2001, activated on March 28, placed on injured reserve on April 9, activated on April 24, and listed as suspended on May 11, 2001. Overall, Greene played in two games for the Avengers during the 2001 season, catching three passes for 27 yards while also posting one solo tackle and one assisted tackle. He was released on December 10, 2001.
