= Mike Rhodes (American football) =

American football player (born 1966)

No. 10
- Position: Quarterback

Personal information
- Born: January 22, 1966 (age 60)
- Listed height: 6 ft 7 in (2.01 m)
- Listed weight: 225 lb (102 kg)

Career information
- High school: Campbell (Smyrna, Georgia)
- College: Georgia Tech
- NFL draft: 1989: undrafted

Career history
- Pittsburgh Gladiators (1989)*; Chicago Rush (1989)*; Denver Dynamite (1989); Washington Commandos (1990); Atlanta Falcons (1991)*; Montreal Machine (1992)*; London Monarchs (1992); Albany Firebirds (1992); Miami Hooters (1993)
- * Offseason or practice squad member only

Career AFL statistics
- Comp. / Att.: 131 / 281
- Passing yards: 1,704
- TD–INT: 16–16
- QB rating: 56.71
- Rushing TDs: 4
- Stats at ArenaFan.com

Robert Michael Rhodes (born January 22, 1966) is an American former professional football quarterback who played four seasons in the Arena Football League (AFL) with the Denver Dynamite, Washington Commandos, Albany Firebirds, and Miami Hooters. He played college football at the Georgia Institute of Technology.

== Early life and college ==
Robert Michael Rhodes was born on January 22, 1966. He played high school football at Campbell High School in Smyrna, Georgia and earned all-metro honors.

Rhodes was initially a member of the UTEP Miners of the University of Texas at El Paso in 1984. He transferred to play for the Georgia Tech Yellow Jackets of the Georgia Institute of Technology in 1985 but did not appear in any games that year. He completed three of three passes for 56 yards in 1986 while also rushing five times for 22 yards. Rhodes missed the 1987 season due to "small tears and a subsequent infection of the rotator cuff in his throwing shoulder". As a fifth-year senior in 1988, he attempted only one pass, completing it for negative six yards.

== Professional career ==
After going undrafted in the 1989 NFL draft, Rhodes signed with the Pittsburgh Gladiators of the Arena Football League (AFL). He was then traded to the Chicago Bruisers before being traded again to the Denver Dynamite. Before the start of the 1989 season, Denver head coach Babe Parilli stated that Rhodes would most likely be the team's starting quarterback. Rhodes ended up splitting time with quarterback Harold Smith. Rhodes played in all four games for the Dynamite in 1989, completing 20 of 41 passes (48.8%) for 230 yards, one touchdown, and four interceptions. The Dynamite finished the season with a 3–1 record but lost in the first round of the playoffs to the Pittsburgh Gladiators.

Rhodes was the primary starter for the Washington Commandos of the AFL during the 1990 season. He appeared in all eight games, totaling 93 completions on 205 passing attempts (45.4%) for 1,229 yards, 13 touchdowns, and ten interceptions, eight rushing attempts for ten yards and four touchdowns, and one reception for a nine-yard touchdown. The Commandos finished the year with a 2–6 record.

On February 20, 1991, it was reported that Rhodes had been invited to a workout with the Atlanta Falcons of the National Football League. He was later signed to a contract by the Falcons. He was released by Atlanta on August 20, 1991.

On February 5, 1992, Rhodes was selected by the Montreal Machine of the World League of American Football (WLAF) in the 15th round, with the 157th overall pick, of the 1992 WLAF draft. He was released by the Machine on March 3, 1992, a few weeks before the start of the 1992 WLAF season.

Rhodes signed with the London Monarchs of the WLAF on May 14, 1992. He was a member of the Monarchs during the 1992 WLAF season but did not play in any games.

On April 8, 1991, Rhodes' AFL rights were selected by the New Orleans Night of the AFL in an expansion draft. On June 10, 1991, his AFL rights were traded to the Albany Firebirds for future considerations. The next year in 1992, Rhodes played in four games for the Firebirds but did not record any statistics other than one solo tackle and one assisted tackle.

Rhodes played in four games, including a short stint as starter for the Miami Hooters of the AFL in 1993, and completed 18 of 35 passes (51.4%) for 245 yards, two touchdowns, and two interceptions.

== Personal life ==
Rhodes' brother, Brent Rhodes, also played football at Georgia Tech.
