= Anna Scharf =

American politician

Member of the Oregon House of Representatives from the 23rd district
- Incumbent
- Assumed office July 6, 2021
- Preceded by: Mike Nearman

Personal details
- Party: Republican
- Education: Southern Oregon University (BS); University of Phoenix (MBA)
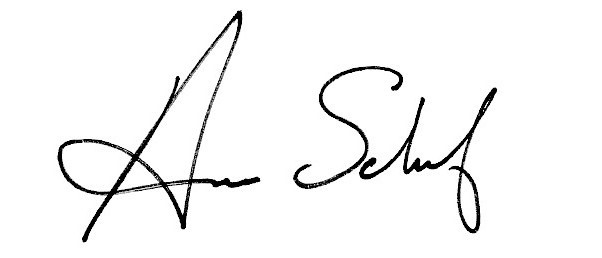
- Signature

Anna Scharf is an American lobbyist, farmer, political advisor, and politician who was appointed to the Oregon House of Representatives for the 23rd district on July 6, 2021.

== Education ==
Scharf graduated from Philomath High School in 1987. She earned a Bachelor of Science degree in political science from Southern Oregon University and a Master of Business Administration from the University of Phoenix.

== Career ==
From 1995 to 2006, Scharf worked for Hewlett-Packard. She was then a strategic sourcing manager for FMC Corporation and a supply chain manager for GK Machine. In 2010 and 2011, she was a membership manager for the Strategic Economic Development Corporation of Oregon. She has worked as an office manager of her family's farm since 2012. Since 2020, Scharf has worked as a seasonal legislative policy analyst for the 23rd district of the Oregon House of Representatives. After Mike Nearman was expelled from the House, Scharf was selected by county commissioners from the 23rd district's four counties to succeed him.

== Electoral history ==
2022 Oregon State Representative, 23rd district
Party	Candidate	Votes	%
Republican	Anna M Scharf	22,294	63.2
Democratic	Kriss Wright	12,900	36.6
Write-in		91	0.3
Total votes		35,285	100%

2024 Oregon State Representative, 23rd district
Party	Candidate	Votes	%
Republican	Anna M Scharf	24,492	62.1
Democratic	Kriss Wright	14,929	37.8
Write-in		49	0.1
Total votes		39,470	100%
