= Notre Dame High School (Chattanooga, Tennessee) =

Location
- 2701 Vermont Avenue; Chattanooga, Tennessee 37404; United States; 35°2′16″N 85°15′32″W

Information
- Type: Private, Coeducational
- Motto: Veritas vincit omnia (Truth conquers all)
- Denomination: Roman Catholic
- Patron saint: Our Lady of Lourdes
- Established: 1876; 150 years ago
- Oversight: Diocese of Knoxville
- Superintendent: George Valadie
- President: Dr. Eric Schexnaildre, Head of School
- Dean: Melissa Wolff, Dean of Academics and Laura Goodhard, Dean of Students
- Principal: Ronnie Bradford, Dean of Faculty
- Grades: 9–12
- Enrolment: 401 (2024-25)
- Average class size: 18
- Student to teacher ratio: 1:10
- Campus size: 20 acres (8.1 ha)
- Colors: Green and White
- Fight song: Victory March
- Mascot: Leprechaun
- Nickname: Shamrock Nation
- Team name: Fighting Irish
- Accreditation: Southern Association of Colleges and Schools
- Yearbook: Irish Echoes
- Tuition: $13,499 (Catholic); $16,899 (non-Catholic)
- Website: www.myndhs.com

Notre Dame High School is a private, Roman Catholic college-preparatory day school in Chattanooga, Tennessee. Founded in 1876, it is Chattanooga's oldest private school. The current campus, dedicated in 1966, is located in the Glenwood neighborhood near Memorial Hospital. Notre Dame was the first racially integrated high school in Chattanooga.

== School history ==
=== Founding and early history ===
In January 1876 the Dominican Sisters of the St. Cecilia Community in Nashville opened a school in Chattanooga at the request of the Father Patrick Ryan, the priest of Sts. Peter and Paul Church. They were informed that it would be necessary to carry on a school for non-Catholic girls in addition to a parochial school which was already in existence and located in the basement of the old church on "A" Street, the present site of the convent building. Teachers at the parochial school included several lay people in the parish. The sisters opened Notre Dame de Lourdes Academy for girls. This building which eventually burned was on the corner of 8th and Lindsay Streets. In 1878 both schools were closed temporarily because of a yellow fever epidemic and used as a hospital. After reopening, the school experienced a period of prosperity with enrollment increasing so rapidly that a larger building was erected in 1886.

=== Renaming and merger ===
In 1898, Notre Dame Academy became a co-educational parochial school and the name was unofficially changed to Notre Dame School. In 1926 Monsignor Francis T. Sullivan, priest of Sts. Peter and Paul Church, readied another school for occupancy. In 1931 Notre Dame High School was accredited by the Southern Association of Secondary Schools and Colleges and by the State of Tennessee and has maintained its accreditation ever since that time.

=== Increased enrollment, racial integration, and new campus ===
In 1954 Notre Dame became inter-parochial under the direction of a priest Principal, Father James Driscoll. This change was in keeping with the policy of the Diocese of Nashville to establish combined high schools in cities where there were two or more parishes. In 1963 another milestone was reached when Notre Dame became the first school in the Chattanooga area to voluntarily become racially integrated. In September 1965 increased enrollment again necessitated more spacious accommodations and Notre Dame High School moved to a new building on Vermont Avenue. The Father William Bevington, newly appointed Principal, began the process of resettlement. Dedicated in 1966, the new campus consisted of a classroom wing, library, and science labs. Art, typing and home economics rooms were equipped for each subject area.

=== Latter 20th Century ===
In 1967 Father Lawrence A. Maxwell became the Principal and served for three years followed by Father J. Patrick Conner in 1970. Father Conner served as Principal for four years during which time enrollment increased to over one hundred students. In 1974 Notre Dame came under the direction of James D. Phifer, the first layman to be Principal. Under his leadership, Notre Dame maintained a vibrant student body as it faced the demands of the 1970's and 1980's. During his tenure a new stadium and auditorium were constructed. In 1997 the school's gymnasium was rededicated and named in honor of Mr. Phifer.

From 1993 until 1996, Gilbert L. Saenz served as Principal. Under his direction Notre Dame experienced a period focused on academic excellence with the expansion of services for students with learning disabilities. Two computer labs were added to the facilities. In 1996 Perry L. Storey assumed the position of principal. Since that time major curriculum improvements have been made to enhance the academic quality of the school.

=== 21st Century ===
In 2000, the school completed a $5 million capital campaign and a $3 million campus improvement project which includes the expansion of the parking area, new closed-circuit security systems, campus landscaping and a 12,500 square foot state-of-the-art Library/Multi-Media Center. In the spring of 2009, the John Varallo Athletic Center and Classroom Annex opened. The new facility occupies a prominent section of the NDHS campus and includes a 6,628 square-foot auxiliary gymnasium, a new weight room, new men’s and women’s locker rooms, a new art studio and dark room, four academic classrooms, new offices and training facilities and flexible use space for dance, cheerleading and yoga, an indoor wellness track, a 5,218 square-foot wrestling and training center and 4,636 square-feet of multi-use space for student, alumni and community programs.

In 2010, the fourth Bishop of Knoxville, Richard F. Stika, arranged for the return of four Dominican Sisters from the St. Cecilia Congregation in Nashville, Tennessee. With the help of many benefactors, a house on Glenwood Avenue was completely renovated for use as a convent. The Notre Dame Convent was blessed and dedicated in January 2011. In 2012 the Notre Dame Chapel was completely renovated and rededicated. Also, the school was named one of the Top 50 Catholic schools by the National Catholic High School Honor Roll for the second consecutive award cycle. In 2013, Mr. George Valadie, a 1971 alumnus and former faculty member and Director of Alumni & Development, was appointed as the school’s first President.

== Extracurricular Activities ==
=== State championships ===
State Championships
Season	Sport	Number of Championships	Year
Fall	Volleyball	1	2006
Fall	Cross Country, Boys	1	1981
Fall	Soccer, Girls	2	1988, 2010
Fall	Soccer, Boys	2	1996, 1997
Winter	Wrestling, Boys	2	1968, 1970
Winter	Wrestling, Dual	3	2006, 2007, 2008
Winter	Bowling, Boys	1	2020
Spring	Baseball	1	1979
Spring	Golf, Boys	2	1985, 2011
Spring	Softball	2	1995
Spring	Tennis, Boys	2	1963, 1964
Spring	Tennis, Girls	2	2012, 2015
Total		20	

== Alumni ==
- Olivia Reeves, Olympic weightlifter
- Adarius Bowman, former CFL wide receiver
- John C. Erickson, founder of Erickson Senior Living
- Chris Grabenstein, New York Times best-selling children's author
- Dennis Haskins, actor known for his role as Principal Richard Belding in the teen sitcom Saved by the Bell
- Patrick Johnson, NFL defensive end for the Philadelphia Eagles
- Reggie Mathis, former NFL linebacker
- Kareem Orr, former NFL player and Super Bowl champion
- Pez Whatley, former professional wrestler
- Tony Tortora, professional disc golfer and musician
