= UT Martin Skyhawks football =

Intercollegiate American football team

2026 UT Martin Skyhawks football team
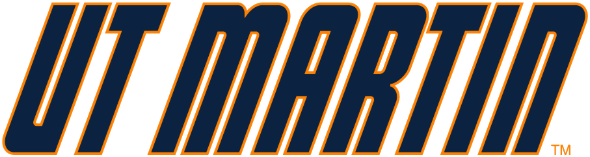
- First season: 1925; 101 years ago
- Athletic director: Kurt McGuffin
- Head coach: Jason Simpson; 21st season, 129–96 (.573)
- Location: Martin, Tennessee
- Stadium: Graham Stadium (capacity: 7,500)
- NCAA division: Division I FCS
- Conference: Ohio Valley
- Colors: Navy blue, orange, and white
- All-time record: 295–388–6 (.433)
- Bowl record: 1–0 (1.000)

Conference championships
- MVC: 1936, 1937 VSAC: 1960 GSC: 1988 OVC: 2006, 2021, 2022 OVC–Big South: 2023, 2024
- Website: utmsports.com

The UT Martin Skyhawks football program is the intercollegiate American football team for the University of Tennessee at Martin in Martin, Tennessee. The team competes in the NCAA Division I Football Championship Subdivision (FCS) as a member of the Ohio Valley Conference (OVC). The school's first football team was fielded in 1925, while known as Hall-Moody Junior College (later changing it to University of Tennessee Junior College in 1927, which they kept until 1950). The team plays its home games at the 7,500 seat Graham Stadium. They are coached by Jason Simpson.

UT Martin's official mascot became the Skyhawks in 1995. The school lists three references regarding the name, such as the fact that when the school's first site was a Bible institute, the school's athletic teams were called "sky pilots", a frontier term for preachers. During World War II, UT Junior College contracted with the Naval War Training Service to help train pilots, who completed their flight training at a nearby general aviation airport now near a high school. Also, Red-tail hawks are indigenous to the West Tennessee region. The previous names of the athletic team were the Junior Volunteers and the Pacers.

== History ==
=== Classifications ===
- 1961–1972: NCAA College Division
- 1973–1991: NCAA Division II
- 1992–present: NCAA Division I–AA/FCS

=== Conference memberships ===
- 1925–1927: Independent
- 1928–1950: Mississippi Valley Conference
- 1951–1970: Volunteer State Athletic Conference
- 1970–1971: Mid-South Athletic Conference
- 1972–1989: Gulf South Conference
- 1990–1991: NCAA Division II Independent
- 1992–present: Ohio Valley Conference

== Conference championships ==
UT Martin has won nine conference championships, four outright and five shared.

Season	Conference	Coach	Overall Record	Conference Record
1936	Mississippi Valley Conference	W. E. Derryberry	8–0	n/a
1937	Mississippi Valley Conference	W. E. Derryberry	6–2–1	n/a
1960	Volunteer State Athletic Conference	Bob Carroll	7–3	n/a
1988†	Gulf South Conference	Don McLeary	11–2	7–1
2006†	Ohio Valley Conference	Jason Simpson	9–3	6–1
2021	Ohio Valley Conference	Jason Simpson	10–3	5–1
2022†	Ohio Valley Conference	Jason Simpson	7–4	5–0
2023†	Big South–OVC Football Association	Jason Simpson	8–3	5–1
2024†	Big South–OVC Football Association	Jason Simpson	8–4	6–2

† denotes co-championship

== Playoff appearances ==
=== NCAA Division I-AA/FCS ===
The Skyhawks have appeared in the FCS playoffs three times with an overall record of 2–3.

Year	Round	Opponent	Result
2006	First Round	Southern Illinois	L 30–36
2021	First Round; Second Round	Missouri State; Montana State	W 32–31; L 7–26
2024	First Round; Second Round	New Hampshire; Montana State	W 41–10; L 17–49

=== NCAA Division II ===
The Skyhawks have appeared in the Division II playoffs one time with an overall record of 1–1.

Year	Round	Opponent	Result
1988	First Round; Quarterfinals	Butler; Texas A&I	W 23–6; L 0–34

== Notable former players ==
Notable alumni include:

- Romel Andrews
- Jeremy Butler
- Mark Guy
- Montori Hughes
- Leon Reed
- Jerry Reese
- Fred Thomas
- Ray Williams

== Future non-conference opponents ==
Announced schedules as of July 29, 2026.

2026	2027	2028	2029	2030	2031
Central Arkansas	at Central Arkansas	at Central Arkansas	Central Arkansas	at Tennessee	at Middle Tennessee
Chicago State	Indiana State	at Iowa	at Vanderbilt	Chattanooga	at Chattanooga
at West Virginia	at UCF	Chattanooga	at Chattanooga	at North Alabama	
at Memphis	at Ball State	at Alabama	North Alabama	at Indiana State	
at Austin Peay	Austin Peay				
