= Larry Barretta =

American football quarterback

Profile
- Position: Quarterback

Personal information
- Listed height: 6 ft 0 in (1.83 m)
- Listed weight: 190 lb (86 kg)

Career information
- College: Lycoming (PA)

Career history
- Pittsburgh Gladiators (1989–1990); Orlando Predators (1991)

Awards and highlights
- Second-team All-American (1986); MAC Player of the Year (1986)

Career AFL statistics
- Comp. / Att.: 59 / 114
- Passing yards: 844
- TD–INT: 17–5
- Passer rating: 95.07
- Rushing TDs: 3
- Stats at ArenaFan.com

Larry Barretta is an American former professional football quarterback who played three seasons in the Arena Football League (AFL) with the Pittsburgh Gladiators and Orlando Predators. He played college football at Lycoming College.

== Early life and college ==
Barretta attended St. John Neumann High School in Philadelphia, Pennsylvania. He played college football for the Lycoming Warriors from 1983 to 1986. He was a backup his freshman year in 1983, appearing in seven games while completing nine of 16 passes for 146 yards, two touchdowns, and one interception, and rushing 36 times for 159 yards and one touchdown. He was then a three-year starter from 1984 to 1986. Barretta led the team to an 8–2 record his sophomore year in 1984, totaling 95 completions on 212 passing attempts (44.8%) for 1,407 yards, nine touchdowns, and seven interceptions, and 157 carries for 533 yards and ten touchdowns. He led the Warriors to a 10–0 record his junior year in 1985, recording 23 passing touchdowns, nine interceptions, and 548 rushing yards while earning Associated Press (AP) honorable mention Little All-American honors. His senior year in 1986, he completed 143 of 287 passes (49.8%) for 2,097 yards and a school-record 25 touchdowns with ten interceptions while also rushing for 778 yards and seven touchdowns while leading the team to an 8–2 record. His 32 total touchdowns set a school record while his 2,875 total offensive yards set a school record and also led NCAA Division III that season. He garnered MAC Player of the Year, Football News second-team All-American, and AP honorable mention Little All-American recognition that year. Barretta set school career records for completions with 368, passing yards with 5,413, passing touchdowns with 59, total offensive yards with 7,431, and total touchdowns with 83.

== Professional career ==
Barretta began his professional career as a tailback in Italy in 1988. He played in four games for the Pittsburgh Gladiators of the Arena Football League (AFL) in 1989, totaling eight completions on 11 attempts for 161 yards and three touchdowns. He appeared in all eight games for the Gladiators in 1990, splitting time with Brendan Folmar. Barretta completed 51 of 101 passes (50.5%) for 683 yards, 14 touchdowns, and five interceptions while scoring two rushing touchdowns. The Gladiators finished with a 3–5 record and lost to the Detroit Drive in the first round of the playoffs. He played in five games for the AFL's Orlando Predators in 1991, recording zero completions on two passing attempts, a one-yard receiving touchdown, and one rushing touchdown.
