= Oregon's 23rd House district =

Legislative districts in the state of Oregon

Oregon's 23rd House district after redistricting after the 2020 Census

District 23 of the Oregon House of Representatives is one of 60 House legislative districts in the state of Oregon. As of 2021, the boundary for the district includes portions of Polk and Yamhill counties. The district includes Dallas, Falls City, Oregon, Dayton, Oregon, Dundee, and Newberg as well as parts of Amity. The district is currently represented by Anna Scharf of Amity, who was appointed on July 12, 2021, after its former Representative Mike Nearman was expelled from office.

== Election results ==
District boundaries have changed over time. Therefore, representatives before 2021 may not represent the same constituency as today. General election results from 2000 to present are as follows:

| Year | Candidate | Party | Percent | Opponent | Party | Percent | Opponent | Party | Percent | Opponent | Party | Percent | Write-in percentage |
|---|---|---|---|---|---|---|---|---|---|---|---|---|---|
| 2000 | Kurt Schrader | Democratic | 76.79% | Marvin Wallace | Constitution | 23.21% | No third candidate | | | No fourth candidate | | | |
| 2002 (Note: Lane Shetterly was the incumbent in this election. He previously represented District 34, but was moved to this district due to redistricting following the 2000 United States census.) | Lane Shetterly | Republican | 67.97% | Peter Leung | Democratic | 31.58% | No third candidate | | | No fourth candidate | | | 0.46% |
| 2004 | Brian Boquist | Republican | 61.16% | Dick Reynolds | Democratic | 35.10% | Paul Delaney | Libertarian | 3.74% | No fourth candidate | | | |
| 2006 | Brian Boquist | Republican | 57.94% | Jason Brown | Democratic | 37.87% | Paul Delaney | Libertarian | 4.08% | No fourth candidate | | | 0.12% |
| 2008 | Jim Thompson | Republican | 57.36% | Jason Brown | Democratic | 42.43% | No third candidate | | | No fourth candidate | | | 0.20% |
| 2010 | Jim Thompson | Republican | 68.03% | Wesley West | Democratic | 31.79% | No third candidate | | | No fourth candidate | | | 0.18% |
| 2012 | Jim Thompson | Republican | 59.10% | Ross Swartzendruber | Democratic | 32.88% | Alex Polikoff | Pacific Green | 7.88% | No fourth candidate | | | 0.14% |
| 2014 | Mike Nearman | Republican | 52.77% | Wanda Davis | Democratic | 36.06% | Alex Polikoff | Pacific Green | 4.63% | Mark Karnowski | Libertarian | 2.48% | 4.07% |
| 2016 | Mike Nearman | Republican | 52.77% | Jim Thompson | Independent | 37.16% | Alex Polikoff | Pacific Green | 5.73% | Garrett Leeds | Libertarian | 4.19% | 0.16% |
| 2018 | Mike Nearman | Republican | 54.35% | Danny Jaffer | Democratic | 43.30% | Mark Karnowski | Libertarian | 2.23% | No fourth candidate | | | 0.11% |
| 2020 | Mike Nearman | Republican | 58.33% | Sean K Scorvo | Democratic | 34.91% | Alex Pokiloff | Pacific Green | 4.32% | Scott D Clawson | Libertarian | 2.35% | 0.09% |
| 2022 | Anna Scharf | Republican | 63.18% | Kriss Wright | Democratic | 36.56% | No third candidate | | | No fourth candidate | | | .26% |
| 2024 | Anna Scharf | Republican | 62.1% | Kriss Wright | Democratic | 37.8% | No third candidate | | | No fourth candidate | | | .1% |

== See also ==
- Oregon Legislative Assembly
- Oregon House of Representatives
