= Alvin Williams (American football) =

American football player (born 1965)

Profile
- Positions: Wide receiver, defensive back

Personal information
- Born: January 17, 1965 (age 61)
- Listed height: 6 ft 0 in (1.83 m)
- Listed weight: 175 lb (79 kg)

Career information
- High school: M. B. Smiley (Houston, Texas)
- College: Texas Southern (1984–1987)

Career history
- New England Steamrollers (1988); Pittsburgh Gladiators (1989); Denver Dynamite (1990–1991); New Orleans Night (1992); Sacramento Attack (1992)

Awards and highlights
- First-team All-Arena (1989); Second-team All-Arena (1991)

Career AFL statistics
- Receptions: 66
- Receiving TDs: 18
- Tackles: 146
- Interceptions: 16
- Pass breakups: 34
- Stats at ArenaFan.com

Alvin Williams (born January 17, 1965) is an American former professional football player who played five seasons in the Arena Football League (AFL) with the New England Steamrollers, Pittsburgh Gladiators, Denver Dynamite, New Orleans Night and Sacramento Attack. He played college football at Texas Southern University.

== Early life and college ==
Alvin Williams was born on January 17, 1965. He attended M. B. Smiley High School in Houston, Texas.

He was a member of the Texas Southern Tigers from 1984 to 1987.

== Professional career ==
After going undrafted in the 1988 NFL draft, Williams signed with the New England Steamrollers of the Arena Football League (AFL). He played in 11 games for the Steamrollers during the 1988 AFL season as a wide receiver/defensive back, totaling 35 receptions for 369 yards and seven touchdowns, 29 solo tackles, five assisted tackles, 0.5 sacks, two interceptions, and eight pass breakups. He spent time on both offense and defense during his AFL career as the league played under ironman rules. The Steamrollers finished the year with a 3–9 record.

Williams played in all four games for the Pittsburgh Gladiators of the AFL in 1989, recording 12 catches for 235 yards and five touchdowns, 11 solo tackles, four assisted tackles, two interceptions, one pass breakup, and one forced fumble. He was named first-team All-Arena for his performance during the 1989 season. The Gladiators finished the regular season with a 3–1 record and eventually lost to the Detroit Drive in ArenaBowl III.

Williams appeared in all eight games for the AFL's Denver Dynamite in 1990, accumulating 28 solo tackles, five assisted tackles, three interceptions, six pass breakups, one forced fumble, one fumble recovery, and two receptions for 21 yards and one touchdown. The Dynamite finished the season with a 4–4 record and lost in the first round of the playoffs to the Dallas Texans. He played in all ten games for the Dynamite in 1991, totaling 42 solo tackles, two assisted tackles, six interceptions for 67 yards and one touchdown, and 11 pass breakups. He earned second-team All-Arena honors that year as a defensive specialist. The Dynamite finished the season with a 6–4 record, losing in the first round of the playoffs to the Tampa Bay Storm.

Williams appeared in six games for the New Orleans Night of the AFL during the 1992 season, accumulating 16 catches for 164 yards and three touchdowns, 18 solo tackles, seven assisted tackles, two interceptions, six pass breakups, and 20 kick returns for 374 yards and one touchdown. He also played in three games for the AFL's Sacramento Attack in 1992, recording six solo tackles, one assisted tackle, one interception, two pass breakups, and one reception for a 46-yard touchdown.
