= Maps Credit Union =

Oregon credit union founded in 1935

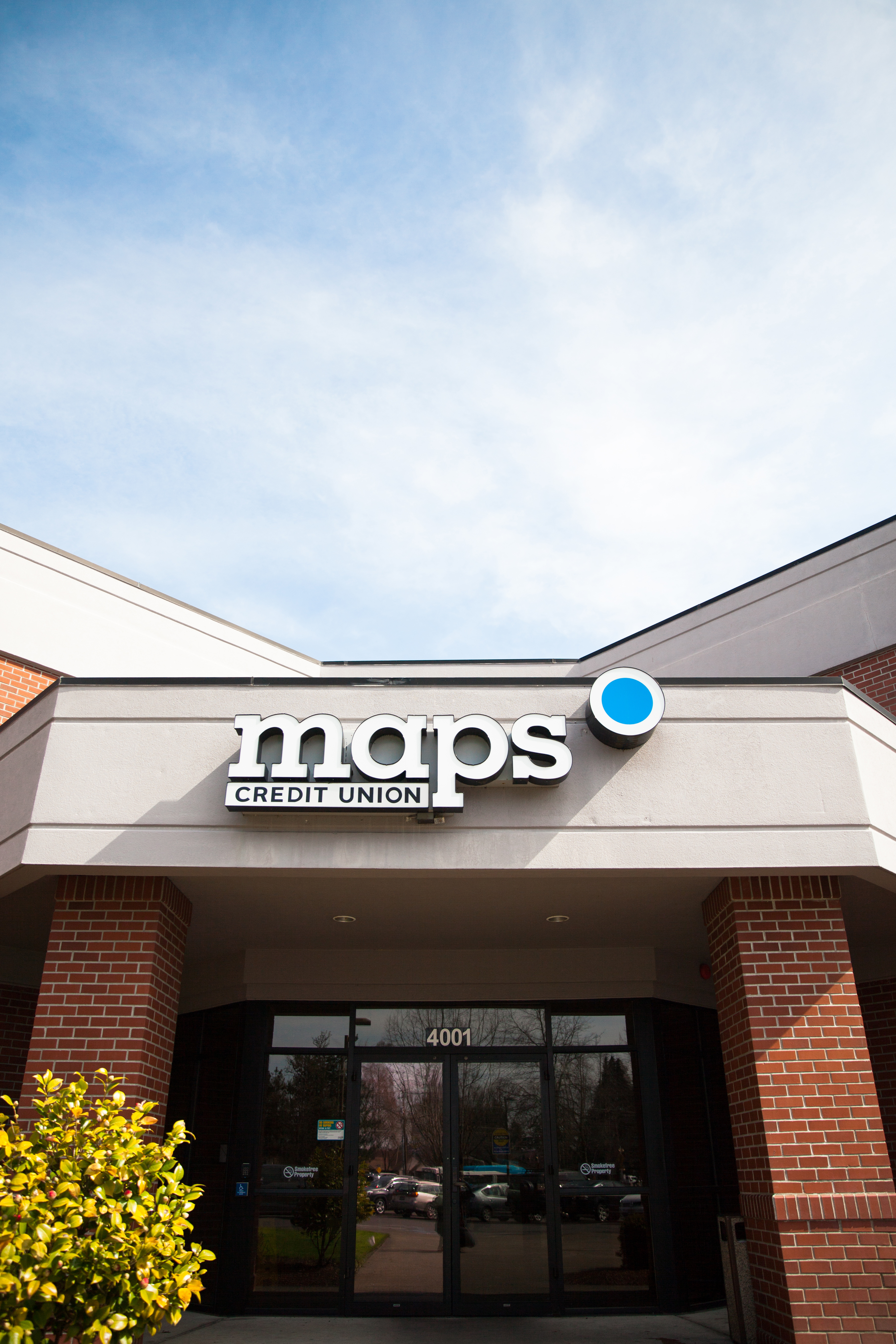
- Maps Credit Union Chemeketa Branch
- Formerly: Salem Public School Teachers Credit Union
- Type: Credit union
- Industry: Financial services
- Founded: June 6, 1935; 91 years ago
- Founders: 20 teachers from the Salem School District
- Headquarters: Salem, Oregon, United States
- Area served: Willamette Valley, Oregon
- Products: Banking services
- Number of employees: 336 (2023)
- Website: www.mapscu.com

The Maps Credit Union is an American credit union based in Salem, Oregon. It began as the Salem Public School Teachers Credit Union. It was founded in 1935 and its first full year of charter was 1936.

It initially served Salem area educators and school employees but in 2008, the credit union expanded its charter to include all Willamette Valley residents. It currently has 15 locations throughout the region.

== History ==
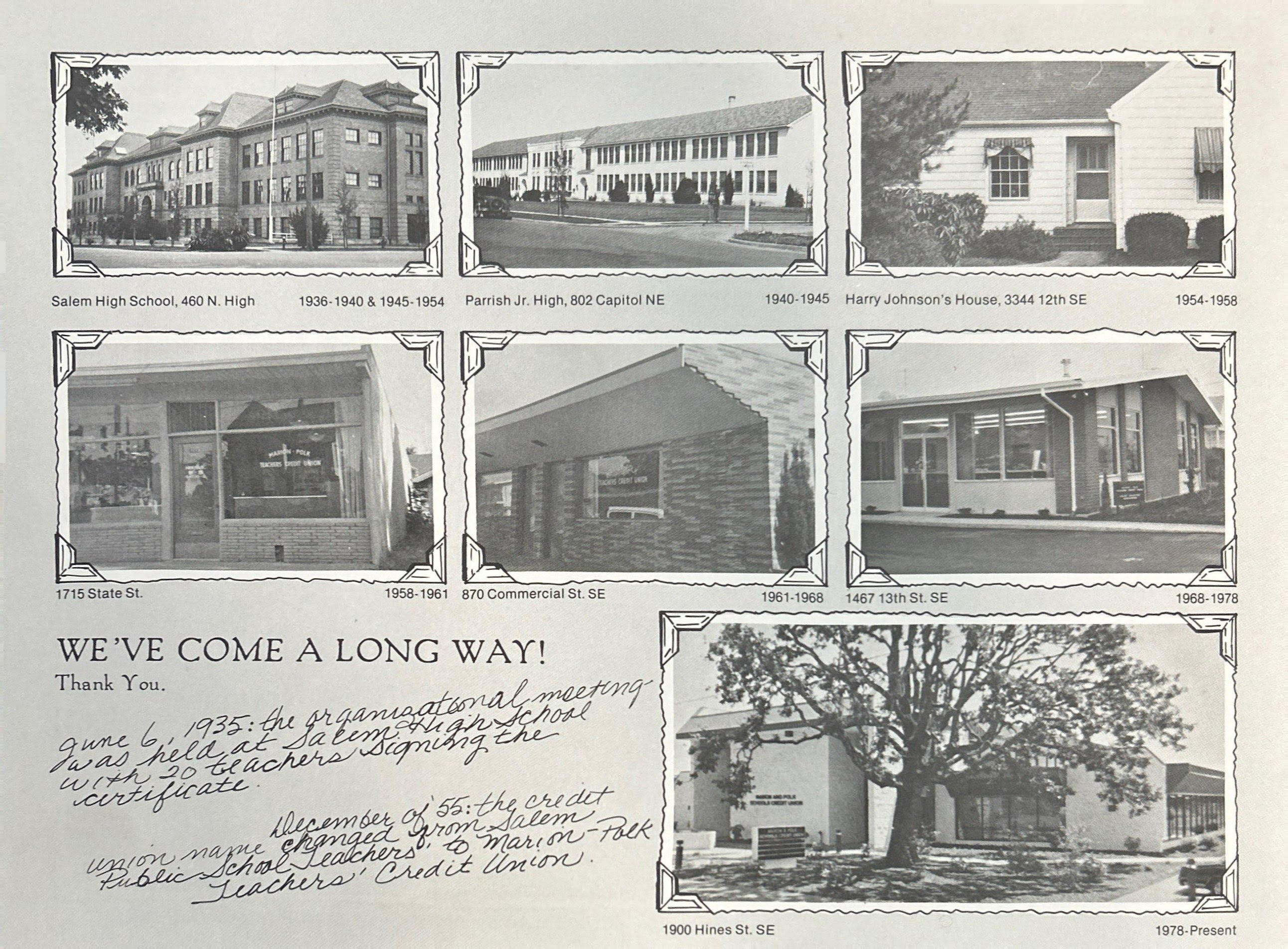
Maps Credit Union offices 1936 to 1961

On June 6, 1935, 20 teachers from the Salem School District and Willamette University signed a certificate to start a credit union, and the first annual meeting was held on December 4, 1935. The initial share cost was $5. The first treasurer was the principal of then Salem Senior High School, Harry Johnson. Johnson and his secretary managed the credit union operations out of the high school office and kept the credit union funds in a desk drawer. In 1955, Johnson retired and moved the credit union operations to his home kitchen, which was located on South 12th Street in Salem, Oregon.

The first official branch opened in 1958 at 1715 State Street in Salem, Oregon but was moved in 1961 to 870 Commercial Street. The Hines Street branch, which is still open today, broke ground in December 1977 at 1900 Hines Street SE.

In 2014, Maps became the first financial institution in Oregon to allow cannabis business accounts. Maps' Chief Operations Officer, Rachel Pross testified to congress in favor of the SAFE Banking Act on behalf of the Credit Union National Association and referenced the credit union's experience with cannabis banking as an example.

== Name Changes ==
The original name for Maps Credit Union was Salem Public School Teachers Credit Union. In 1956, the same year that Western Oregon University students and faculty became eligible for membership, the financial institution was renamed Marion-Polk Teachers Credit Union.

Then, in 1976, the credit union board held a "Name Your Credit Union" contest and decided to adopt the name Marion & Polk Schools Credit Union. In 2011, the credit union adopted its longtime nickname "Maps" as its official name and rolled out a new logo.

The new dot-shaped logo, which replaced the former schoolhouse logo, was meant to resemble the destination dots commonly seen on maps.

== The Maps Community Foundation ==
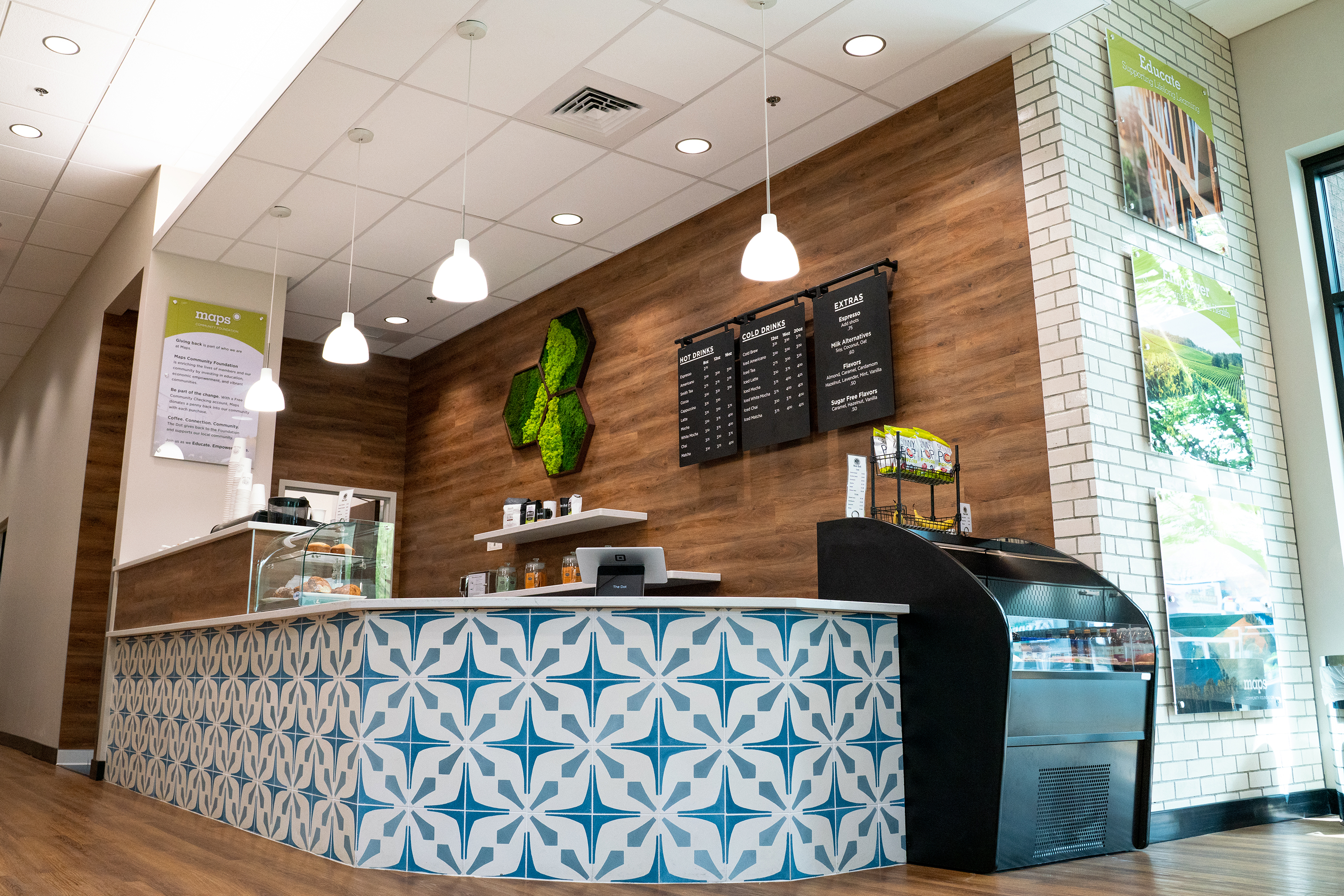
The Dot, a philanthropy-driven coffeeshop that helps fund the Maps Community Foundation

In 2011, Maps Credit Union established the Maps Community Foundation, a charitable foundation dedicated to supporting education and encouraging economic empowerment in the Mid-Willamette Valley. The foundation is funded largely through the credit union's Free Community Checking program, which accounted for $130,000 in community donations in 2021.

In 2022, Maps Credit Union opened a coffeeshop inside its High Street Branch in downtown Salem, Oregon. The coffeeshop, which is known as The Dot, is intended to raise funds for the Maps Community Foundation.
