= Chuck Harris (American football) =

American football player (born 1961)

No. 75
- Positions: Offensive lineman, defensive lineman

Personal information
- Born: October 7, 1961 (age 65); Cuba City, Wisconsin, U.S.
- Listed height: 6 ft 3 in (1.91 m)
- Listed weight: 255 lb (116 kg)

Career information
- College: North Iowa Area, West Virginia

Career history
- Denver Dynamite (1987); Chicago Bears (1987); Los Angeles Cobras (1988); Maryland/Washington Commandos (1989–1990); Albany Firebirds (1991)

Awards and highlights
- ArenaBowl champion (1987); First-team All-Arena (1989); Second-team All-Arena (1990)

Career NFL statistics
- Games played: 3
- Stats at Pro Football Reference

Career AFL statistics
- Tackles: 47
- Sacks: 10
- Forced fumbles: 2
- Fumble recoveries: 3
- Stats at ArenaFan.com

Charles William Harris (born October 7, 1961) is an American former professional football player for the Chicago Bears of the National Football League (NFL) in 1987. He played college football for the West Virginia Mountaineers.
