= 1989 Chicago Bruisers season =

Arena Football League team season

- Head coach: George Brancato
- Home stadium: Rosemont Horizon

Results
- Record: 1–3
- Division place: 4th
- Playoffs: Lost semi-finals (Drive) 10–43

The 1989 Chicago Bruisers season was the third and final season for the Chicago Bruisers. The Bruisers finished 1–3 and lost in the semi-finals to the Detroit Drive.

== Regular season ==
=== Schedule ===
Week	Date	Opponent	Results		Game site
Week	Date	Opponent	Final score	Team record	Game site
1	July 7	Detroit Drive	L 28–40	0–1	Rosemont Horizon
2	Bye				
3	July 22	Pittsburgh Gladiators	L 38–47	0–2	Neutral Site
4	July 29	Maryland Commandos	W 61–27	1–2	Neutral Site
5	August 4	Denver Dynamite	L 40–41	1–3	Neutral Site

=== Standings ===
1989 Arena Football League standings
Team	W	L	T	PCT	PF	PA	PF (Avg.)	PA (Avg.)	STK
xy-Detroit Drive	3	1	0	.750	154	84	38.5	21	W 1
x-Pittsburgh Gladiators	3	1	0	.750	159	147	39.75	36.75	W 1
x-Denver Dynamite	3	1	0	.750	94	97	23.5	24.25	W 2
x-Chicago Bruisers	1	3	0	.250	167	155	41.75	38.75	L 1
Maryland Commandos	0	4	0	.000	79	170	19.75	42.5	L 4

y – clinched regular-season title

x – clinched playoff spot

== Playoffs ==
Round	Date	Opponent	Results		Game site
Round	Date	Opponent	Final score	Team record	Game site
Semi-finals	August 11	Detroit Drive	L 10–43	0–1	Joe Louis Arena

== Roster ==
1989 Chicago Bruisers roster
Quarterbacks: 5 Ben Bennett; -- John Welch; Wide Receivers/Defensive Backs: 84 Carl Aikens, Jr.; -- Mike McDade; -- Ken Sanders; -- Reggie Smith; 80 Steve Thonn	Fullbacks/Linebackers: 32 Darryl Clark; -- Jeff Dole; 82 Osia Lewis; -- Dan Sellers; Offensive Linemen/Defensive Linemen: 73 Alan Donnell; -- Pete Endre; -- George Miller; -- Ted McNairy; 64 Keith Williams	Wide Receiver/Linebackers: -- Kennedy Wilson; -- Mark Young; Kickers: 7 Rob Houghtlin; Rookies in italics Roster updated March 11, 2013; 19 Active, 0 Inactive, 0 PS → More rosters

== Awards ==
Position	Player	Award	All-Arena team
Wide Receiver/Defensive Back	Carl Aikens, Jr.	Ironman of the Year	1st
