= George LaFrance =

American football player (born 1965)

No. 25, 27
- Position: Offensive specialist

Personal information
- Born: September 24, 1965 (age 61); New Iberia, Louisiana, U.S.
- Listed height: 6 ft 0 in (1.83 m)
- Listed weight: 180 lb (82 kg)

Career information
- High school: New Iberia Senior
- College: Baker
- NFL draft: 1987: undrafted

Career history

Playing
- Detroit Drive (1988–1993); Tampa Bay Storm (1994–1999); New Jersey Red Dogs (2000)

Operations
- San Diego Riptide (General Manager) (2002); Arena Football League (VP of Alumni Association)

Awards and highlights
- 5× ArenaBowl champion (1988, 1989, 1992, 1995, 1996); 3× ArenaBowl MVP (1989, 1992, 1995); 2× AFL MVP (1989, 1991); First-team All-Arena – WR/DB (1989); First-team All-Arena – OS/KR (1991); AFL All Star – WR/DB (1993); AFL 10th Anniversary Team – OS (1996); First-team AFL 15th Anniversary Team – KR (2001); AFL's 20 Greatest Players #3 (2006); AFL's 25 Greatest Players #6 (2012); All-ArenaBowl Team – OS (1999); AFL Hall of Fame (2011); Baker Athletics Hall of Fame (2002)

Career AFL statistics
- Receptions: 629
- Receiving yards: 9,004
- Receiving touchdowns: 197
- Kick return yards: 9,298
- Kick return touchdowns: 13
- Stats at ArenaFan.com

George Herbert LaFrance III (born September 24, 1965) is an American former professional football player who was an offensive specialist in the Arena Football League (AFL). In a playing career lasting twelve years, he played for the Detroit Drive (1988–1993), Tampa Bay Storm (1994–1999), and New Jersey Red Dogs (2000). In 2002, he served as general manager of the af2's San Diego Riptide.

== Career ==
LaFrance attended Baker University in Baldwin City, Kansas, where he played as a wide receiver for two years.

LaFrance is in the AFL Hall Of Fame, and in ArenaBowl IX, wearing #25 for the Storm, became the only player to ever win ArenaBowl MVP 3 times. LaFrance is the career leader in Tampa Bay Storm all-purpose yards with over 20,000.

== Retirement ==
In 2012, the 47-year-old LaFrance cited his desire to return to the AFL after 12 seasons of retirement. LaFrance stated, "You can always think. I'm in good shape. It would be during the playoffs. What team I'm looking at, I don't know. A team that's ready. I'll keep that wide open."

LaFrance is currently athletic director at Navajo Technical University in Crownpoint, New Mexico.
