= Patrick Slowey House =

Historic house in Massachusetts, United States

- U.S. National Register of Historic Places
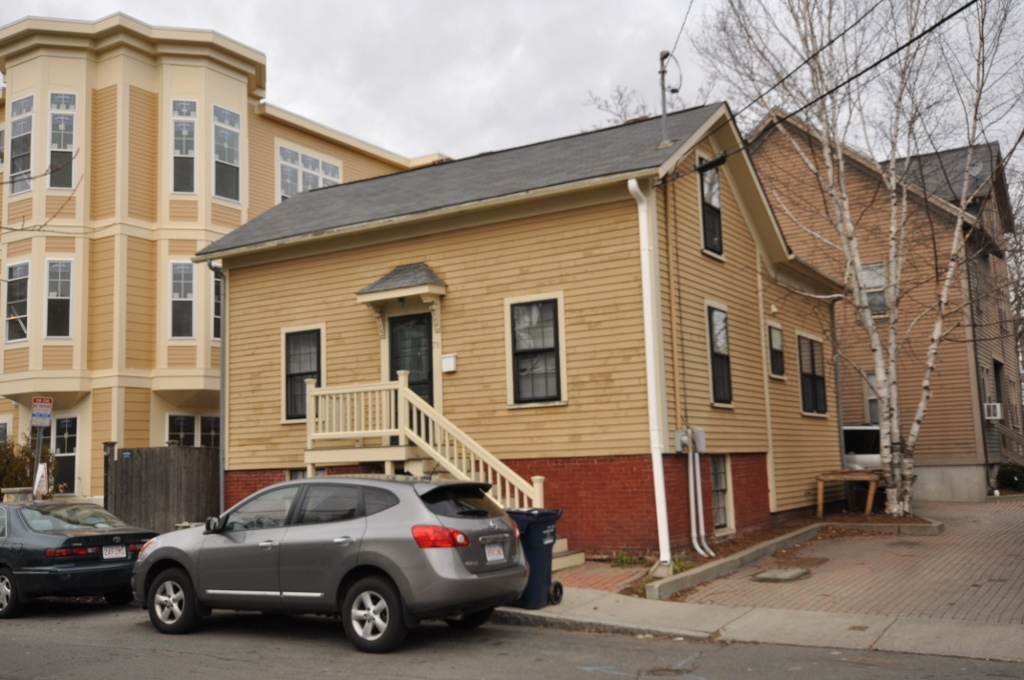

- Location within Massachusetts Location within the United States
- Location: 71 Bolton Street, Cambridge, Massachusetts
- Coordinates: 42°23′24.9″N 71°7′55.0″W
- Built: 1852
- Architectural style: Greek Revival, Italianate
- MPS: Cambridge MRA
- NRHP reference No.: 82001977
- Added to NRHP: April 13, 1982

The Patrick Slowey House is a historic house in Cambridge, Massachusetts, United States. It is a 1½ story wood-frame structure, set on a high brick basement. The front facade is three bays wide, with a center entrance sheltered by a modest Italianate hood and accessed by a side-facing stair. The house was built in 1852 for Patrick Slowey, a laborer, and retains original elements, including its clapboard siding. It is one of the best-preserved workers' houses in northwestern Cambridge.

The building was added to the National Register of Historic Places in 1982, where it is listed at 73 Bolton Street.

== See also ==
- National Register of Historic Places listings in Cambridge, Massachusetts
