= 1989 Arena Football League season =

- League: Arena Football League
- Sport: Arena football
- Duration: July 7, 1989 – August 5, 1989

Regular season
- Season champions: Detroit Drive
- Season MVP: George LaFrance, DET

League postseason
- 1 vs 4 Semifinals champions: Detroit Drive
- 1 vs 4 Semifinals runners-up: Chicago Bruisers
- 2 vs 3 Semifinals champions: Pittsburgh Gladiators
- 2 vs 3 Semifinals runners-up: Denver Dynamite

ArenaBowl III
- Champions: Detroit Drive
- Runners-up: Pittsburgh Gladiators
- Finals MVP: George LaFrance, DET

AFL seasons
- ← 1988 1990 →

AFL teams

The 1989 Arena Football League season was the third season of the Arena Football League (AFL). The league champions were the Detroit Drive, who defeated the Pittsburgh Gladiators in ArenaBowl III.

== Standings ==
1989 Arena Football League standings
Team	W	L	T	PCT	PF	PA	PF (Avg.)	PA (Avg.)	STK
xy-Detroit Drive	3	1	0	.750	154	84	38.5	21	W 1
x-Pittsburgh Gladiators	3	1	0	.750	159	147	39.75	36.75	W 1
x-Denver Dynamite	3	1	0	.750	94	97	23.5	24.25	W 2
x-Chicago Bruisers	1	3	0	.250	167	155	41.75	38.75	L 1
Maryland Commandos	0	4	0	.000	79	170	19.75	42.5	L 4

y – clinched regular-season title

x – clinched playoff spot

== Playoffs ==
Semifinals
1	Detroit	43
4	Chicago	10
2	Pittsburgh	39
3	Denver	37

ArenaBowl III
1	Detroit	39
2	Pittsburgh	26

== Awards and honors ==
=== Regular season awards ===
Award	Winner	Position	Team
Most Valuable Player	George LaFrance	Wide Receiver/Defensive Back	Detroit Drive
Ironman of the Year	Dwayne Dixon	Wide Receiver/Defensive Back	Chicago Bruisers
Coach of the Year	Babe Parilli	Head coach	Denver Dynamite

=== All-Arena team ===
Position	First team
Quarterback	Willie Totten, Pittsburgh
Fullback/Linebacker	Lynn Bradford, Detroit
Wide receiver/Defensive back	George LaFrance, Detroit; Carl Aikens, Chicago; Alvin Williams, Pittsburgh
Offensive lineman/Defensive lineman	Quinton Knight, Denver; Chuck Harris, Maryland; Reggie Mathis, Detroit
Kicker	Gary Gussman, Denver

== Team notes ==
# of Teams	Expansion Teams	Folded Teams	Suspended Teams	Teams returning from previous season	Teams returning after hiatus	Relocated Teams	Name Changes
5		Los Angeles Cobras; New England Steamrollers; New York Knights		Chicago Bruisers; Pittsburgh Gladiators; Detroit Drive	Denver Dynamite; Maryland Commandos		
