= Western Oregon University =

Public university in Monmouth, Oregon, US

- Former names: Monmouth University (1856–1865); Christian College (1865–1882); Oregon State Normal School (1882–1910); Oregon Normal School (1910–1939); Oregon College of Education (1939–1981); Western Oregon State College (1981–1997)
- Type: Public university
- Established: January 18, 1856; 170 years ago
- Accreditation: NWCCU
- Academic affiliations: HECC; Space-grant
- Endowment: $16 million (2021)
- President: Jesse Peters
- Provost: Jose E. Coll
- Faculty: 452
- Administrative staff: 427
- Students: 3,857 (fall 2023)
- Undergraduates: 3,249 (fall 2023)
- Postgraduates: 608 (fall 2023)
- Location: Monmouth, Oregon, United States; 44°51′10″N 123°14′22″W
- Campus: 157 acres (0.64 km^{2}); Fringe town
- Newspaper: The Western Howl
- Colors: Red
- Nickname: Wolves
- Sporting affiliations: NCAA Division II – GNAC; LSC
- Mascot: Wolfie
- Website: wou.edu

Western Oregon University (WOU) is a public university in Monmouth, Oregon, United States. It was originally established in 1856 by Disciples of Christ pioneers as Monmouth University. Subsequent names included Oregon State Normal School, Oregon College of Education, and Western Oregon State College. Western Oregon University incorporates both the College of Education and the College of Liberal Arts and Sciences. Enrollment is approximately 3,850 students.

== History ==
=== Establishment ===
Western Oregon University was founded in 1856 as Monmouth University. In 1865, it merged with another private institution, Bethel College, in Bethel and became Christian College. In 1882, the Oregon State Legislature approved the college's bid to become a state-supported teacher training (or "normal") school, Oregon State Normal School.

In November 1910, an initiative petition (Measure 10) to establish a normal school at Monmouth, passed by 55.6%. The name was changed, for the fourth time, to Oregon Normal School. On the same ballot were two other measures to additionally establish normal schools in Ashland and Weston: both failed.

=== Growth ===
A period of growth was experienced in the 1920s during which the school's enrollment more than tripled from 316 in 1920 to peak at the 990 mark in 1927. With the coming of the Great Depression attendance tailed off slightly, with an average attendance in 1930 of 705 students, hitting a nadir in the 1933–34 academic year. Attendance rebounded later in the decade, topping the 1,000 mark for the first time during the 1938–39 academic year, with a total enrollment including summer session of 1,017.

In 1939, the Oregon Legislature changed the name for the fifth time, to Oregon College of Education. The school entered an extended period of growth, except for a period during World War II when college enrollments dropped nationwide. New programs were added in the areas of liberal arts and sciences.

=== Name changes ===
In 1981, the institution was renamed Western Oregon State College to reflect the school's growing academic programs in the liberal arts fields. In 1997 the name was updated to Western Oregon University, reflecting the university's broader academic mission and profile.

== Academics ==
Undergraduate demographics as of Fall 2023
Race and ethnicity	Total
White	57%
Hispanic	25%
Two or more races	7%
Asian	3%
Black	3%
Unknown	2%
American Indian/Alaska Native	1%
International student	1%
Native Hawaiian/Pacific Islander	1%
Economic diversity
Low-income (Note: The percentage of students who received an income-based federal Pell grant intended for low-income students.)	40%
Affluent (Note: The percentage of students who are a part of the American middle class at the bare minimum.)	60%

Western Oregon University offers bachelor's degrees (BA, BS, BM, BFA), and AB through its two colleges: the College of Education and the College of Liberal Arts and Sciences. Master's degrees are available in Education (MAT and MSEd), Rehabilitation Counseling (MS), Criminal Justice (MA), Music (MM), and Management and Information Systems (MS). In 2015, U.S. News & World Report ranked Western as the 77th best amongst the regional universities in the west.

In January 2024, the university announced it would eliminate its D− and F grades and instead replace these with a grade of "no credit". This was done in attempt to improve retention and graduation rates and focus on student learning outcomes.

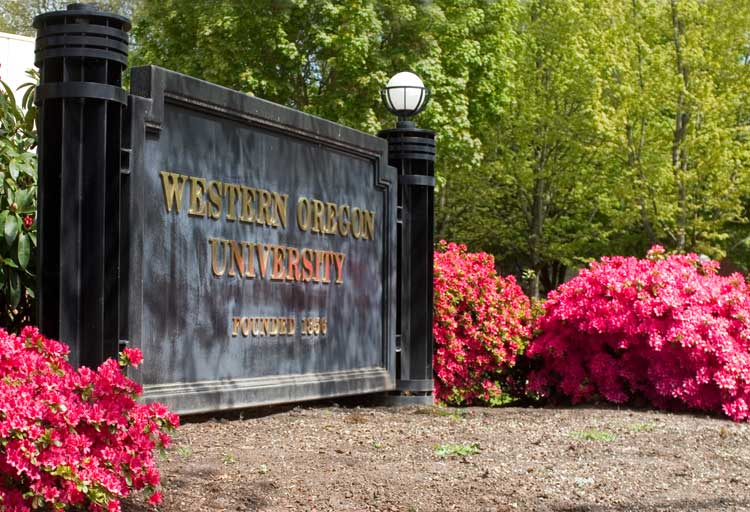
Entrance sign

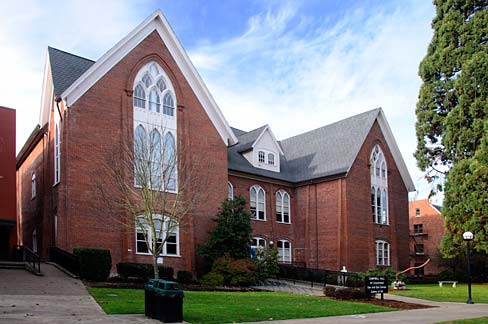
Campbell Hall

=== College of Education ===
WOU's College of Education is divided into: Division of Education and Leadership, Division of Deaf Studies and Professional Studies, and Division of Health and Exercise Science.

=== College of Liberal Arts and Sciences ===
The College of Liberal Arts and Sciences offers 30 bachelor's degrees in seven academic divisions: Behavioral Science, Business and Economics, Computer Science, Creative Arts, Humanities, Natural Sciences and Mathematics, and Social Science.

== Athletics ==
The Western Oregon athletic teams are called the Wolves. The university is a member of the Division II level of the National Collegiate Athletic Association (NCAA), primarily competing in the Great Northwest Athletic Conference (GNAC) since the 2001–02 academic year. Western Oregon has competed in the Lone Star Conference (LSC) for football as an affiliate member since the 2022 season. The Wolves previously competed in the D-II Pacific West Conference (PacWest) from 1998–99 to 2000–01; and in the Cascade Collegiate Conference (CCC) of the National Association of Intercollegiate Athletics (NAIA) from 1993–94 to 1997–98 (although they remained in the CCC as an affiliate member for some sports from 1998–99 to 1999–2000).

Western Oregon competes in 12 intercollegiate varsity sports: Men's sports include baseball, basketball, cross country, football, soccer and track & field, while women's sports include basketball, cross country, soccer, softball, track & field and volleyball.

== Notable alumni ==
- Kevin Boss – American football player for the New York Giants, Oakland Raiders, and Kansas City Chiefs
- Tony Burris – American football player, Arena Football League's Detroit Drive and Washington Commandos
- Jeff Charleston – American football player, New Orleans Saints
- Brian Greene – American football player
- Marco Hernandez – First Latino to serve as U.S. district court judge in Oregon.
- Robert Oberst – Professional strongman who competes yearly in The World's Strongest Man competition
- Bryce Peila – American football player, Arena Football League's Portland Thunder/Steel
- Jason Slowey – American football player for the Oakland Raiders
- Lane Shetterly - Oregon state legislator
- Nathan Soltz - Chair of the Democratic Party of Oregon
- Dan Straily (born 1988), starting pitcher in the Philadelphia Phillies organization
- Mark Thorson – American football player
- Tyrell Williams – American football player for the Las Vegas Raiders

== Greek life ==
On May 18, 2012, the school was introduced to its first traditional Greek life with the organization and initiation of Kappa Sigma fraternity, Sigma Tau chapter . The schools Greek system now consists of one traditional fraternity, one traditional sorority, one non-traditional fraternity and one non-traditional sorority. The school welcomed Alpha Chi Omega, its first traditional sorority in the fall of 2015 with the organization founding its chapter in 2016. On November 29, 2012, the Beta Kappa chapter of Omega Delta Phi fraternity was founded. Kappa Delta Chi is the other non-traditional sorority on campus.
