= Jason Slowey =

American gridiron football player (born 1989)

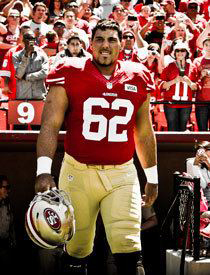
- Slowey with the San Francisco 49ers in 2012

Stanford Cardinal
- Title: Defensive quality control analyst

Personal information
- Born: January 27, 1989 (age 37); Medford, Oregon, U.S.
- Listed height: 6 ft 3 in (1.91 m)
- Listed weight: 303 lb (137 kg)

Career information
- Position: Center
- High school: North Medford
- College: Western Oregon (2007–2011)
- NFL draft: 2012: 6th round, 199th overall pick

Career history

Playing
- San Francisco 49ers (2012)*; Oakland Raiders (2012–2013)*; BC Lions (2014)
- * Offseason or practice squad member only

Coaching
- Western Oregon (2014) Offensive Line GA; Western Oregon (2015–2016) Tight Ends coach; Western Oregon (2017–2018) Linebackers coach; Western Oregon (2019–2022) Co-Defensive Coordinator/Linebackers coach; Sacramento State (2023–2024) Defensive Ends coach; Stanford (2025–present) Defensive Quality Control Analyst

Awards and highlights
- As a player: 2× Division II All-American (2010, 2011); GNAC Offensive Lineman of the Year (2011); 3× All-GNAC (2009, 2010, 2011); As a coach: GNAC Champion (2019)
- Stats at Pro Football Reference

Jason Slowey (born January 27, 1989) is an American former football center. He played college football for the Western Oregon Wolves and was selected by the San Francisco 49ers in the sixth round of the 2012 NFL draft. He was also a member of the Oakland Raiders and BC Lions. He is currently a defensive quality control analyst at Stanford University.

== Early life ==
Slowey attended North Medford High School in Medford, Oregon where he played offensive tackle. Slowey generated interest from Oregon State University, Boise State University and Portland State University before ultimately signing a National Letter of Intent to attend Western Oregon University. Slowey competed in track & field while in high school, finishing as the state runner-up in discus (48.28) at the 2007 6A OSAA Track & Field Championships.

== College career ==
Slowey attended Western Oregon University, where he played for coach Arne Ferguson's Western Oregon Wolves football team from 2007 to 2011. Following a red shirt year in 2007, Slowey made his first start for the Wolves against Portland State University on August 30, 2008. He appeared in nine games during the 2008 season, helping the Wolves to a 7–4 record and second place finish in the Great Northwest Athletic Conference (GNAC).

In 2009, Slowey started all 10 games at tackle, and was recognized as second team All-GNAC offensive lineman. The Wolves finished second in the GNAC standings with a 5–5 record.

The 2010 season was highlighted by a six-game win streak and two defensive shut-outs. The Wolves finished 8–3 after losing to Central Washington University in the GNAC Championship Game on November 13, 2010. Slowey started all 11 games at tackle, and was recognized as first team All-GNAC, and Honorable Mention All-American.

In 2011, Slowey started all 11 games at tackle, and was recognized as first-team All-GNAC, GNAC Offensive Lineman of the Year, and first-team All-American. The Wolves finished second in the GNAC standings with a 6–5 record.

== Professional career ==
=== Pre-draft ===
Slowey drew little attention heading into the 2012 NFL draft until Western Oregon's pro day on March 16, 2012. After a solid performance media began to take notice. Sport's Illustrated's Tony Pauline tabbed Slowey as "one of the nastiest blockers in the draft". Although he was a left tackle in college, he was projected to move inside to center in the NFL.

Pre-draft measurables
Height	Weight	Arm length	Hand span	40-yard dash	10-yard split	20-yard split	20-yard shuttle	Three-cone drill	Vertical jump	Broad jump	Bench press
6 ft 2.5 in (1.89 m)	303 lb (137 kg)	33.5 in (0.85 m)	10.25 in (0.26 m)	4.96 s	1.71 s	2.90 s	4.64 s	7.21 s	27.5 in (0.70 m)	9 ft 2 in (2.79 m)	38 reps
Values from WOUWolves.com & NFL.com

=== San Francisco 49ers ===
Slowey was selected in the sixth round with the 199th overall pick by the San Francisco 49ers in the 2012 NFL draft. On August 10, 2012, Slowey made his NFL debut against the Minnesota Vikings. He appeared in two pre season games for the 49ers. On August 27, 2012 Slowey was released by the 49ers.

=== Oakland Raiders ===
On October 23, 2012, Slowey was signed by the Oakland Raiders. On April 8, 2013, Slowey was released by the Raiders.

=== Portland Thunder ===
On October 10, 2013, Slowey was assigned to the Portland Thunder of the Arena Football League.

=== BC Lions ===
On April 23, 2014, Slowey signed a contract with the BC Lions of the Canadian Football League. Slowey retired in June 2014 due to an injury.

=== Portland Steel ===
On July 18, 2016, Slowey was activated by the Portland Steel. He was placed on recallable reassignment the next day.

== Coaching career ==
=== Western Oregon ===
In 2014, Slowey was hired as the assistant offensive line coach for Western Oregon. In 2015, he was promoted to tight ends coach. In 2017, he was promoted to linebackers coach.

=== Sacramento State ===
On February 9, 2023, Slowey was hired as the defensive ends coach by Sacramento State.
