= Washington Commandos =

Arena football team

Logo

General information
- Founded: 1987
- Folded: 1990
- Headquartered: Patriot Center in Fairfax, Virginia
- Colors: Red, blue, white

Personnel
- Head coach: Mike Hohensee

Team history
- Washington Commandos (1987, 1990); Maryland Commandos (1989)

Home fields
- Capital Centre (1987 & 1989); Patriot Center (1990)

League / conference affiliations
- Arena Football League (1987, 1989–1990)

The Washington Commandos were an arena football team based in Fairfax, Virginia. The Commandos were founded in 1987 and were an inaugural member of the Arena Football League (AFL), and were based in Landover, Maryland. After not playing during the 1988 season, the team returned for the 1989 season as the Maryland Commandos. Following the 1989 season, the Commandos moved to Fairfax, Virginia, where they once again became known as the Washington Commandos. The team never achieved much success at either of its locations, winning four games in three seasons, including a winless 1989 season.

== History ==
=== Inaugural season (1987) ===
The Commandos had the honor of playing in the first AFL regular season game on June 19, 1987, losing to the Pittsburgh Gladiators 48–46 at the Civic Arena. The Commandos picked up their first win in franchise history the following week, when they defeated the Denver Dynamite, by a score of 36–20 in their home opener. The Commandos finished the season with a 2–4 record, a disappointment, but the team was in every game except one, losing three games by a total of six points.

=== Move to Maryland (1989) ===
After a one-year hiatus, the Commandos returned to play in 1989 and operated as the "Maryland Commandos", playing their only home game that year at the same venue as in 1987, Landover's Capital Centre. The team went 0–4 in the abbreviated 'travelin' season of 1989. The Commandos coaching staff consisted of Ray Willsey, Mike Hohensee, Mike Dailey, and Jerry Kurz. Hohensee, Dailey, and Kurz would all become members of the Arena Football Hall of Fame.

=== Return to Virginia (1990) ===
The team returned to the Washington name for their final season in 1990. They were coached by Hohensee, who had been promoted from his assistant position. The Commandos started the season 0–3.

In 1987 and 1989, the team played its home games at the Capital Centre (later known as USAir Arena) in Landover, Maryland. For the 1990 season, the team was based at the Patriot Center on the campus of George Mason University in Fairfax, Virginia.

== Return of the AFL in Washington ==
In 1999, Washington Redskins owner Daniel Snyder announced that he would bring an expansion team to DC to be called the Washington Warriors. (At the time, there was speculation in the media that Snyder actually wanted to change the name of the Redskins to the Warriors, due to the controversy over the NFL's team monicker.) But after a ten-year wait and the AFL's canceling its season in 2009, that never materialized.

In 2016, it was announced that Ted Leonsis of Monumental Sports, owner of the NBA's Washington Wizards, WNBA's Washington Mystics and the NHL's Washington Capitals was launching an expansion franchise that would play at the Verizon Center in Washington, DC in 2017. The Washington Valor played from 2017 until 2019, when the league was suspended.

== Notable players ==
=== Arena Football League Hall of Famers ===
Washington Commandos Hall of Famers
No.	Name	Year Inducted	Position(s)	Years w/ Commandos
--	Mike Dailey	2012	Assistant Coach	1989–1990
--	Dwayne Dixon	1998	WR/DB	1987
--	Mike Hohensee	2012	Asst./Head Coach	1989–1990
67	Jon Roehlk	1999	OL/DL	1987

=== All-Arena players ===
The following Commandos players were named to All-Arena Teams:

- QB Rich Ingold (1)
- WR/DB Dwayne Dixon (1), Lenny Taylor (1), Chris Armstrong (1)
- OL/DL Jon Roehlk (1), Michael Witteck (1), Chuck Harris (2)
- K Dale Castro (1)

== Head coaches ==
Name	Term	Regular season				Playoffs		Awards
Name	Term	W	L	T	Win%	W	L	Awards
Bob Harrison	1987	2	4	0	.333	0	0	
Ray Willsey	1989	0	4	0	.000	0	0	
Mike Hohensee	1990	2	6	0	.250	0	0	

== Season-by-season results ==
ArenaBowl Champions	Division champions	Wild card berth	League leader

Season	Team	League	Division	Regular season				Postseason results
Season	Team	League	Division	Finish	Wins	Losses	Ties	Postseason results
Washington Commandos
1987	1987	AFL	--	3rd	2	4	0	
Maryland Commandos
1989	1989	AFL	--	5th	0	4	0	
Washington Commandos
1990	1990	AFL		6th	2	6	0	
Totals					4	14	0	All-time regular season record (1987–1990)
Totals					0	0	-	All-time postseason record (1987–1990)
Totals					4	14	0	All-time regular season and postseason record (1987–1990)
