= ArenaBowl III =

Arena Football League's third Arena Bowl

Pittsburgh Gladiators (2nd)	Detroit Drive (1st)
26	39
	1	2	3	4	Total
PIT	3	9	14	0	26
DET	16	10	13	0	39
- Date: August 18, 1989
- Stadium: Joe Louis Arena; Detroit, Michigan
- MVP: George LaFrance, OS, Detroit: Cornelius Ross, WR/DB, Pittsburgh (Ironman of the Game)
- Attendance: 12,046
- Winning coach: Tim Marcum
- Losing coach: Joe Haering

TV in the United States
- Network: Prime Network
- Announcers: Dave Enet, Howard Balzer

ArenaBowl '89 (or ArenaBowl III) was the Arena Football League's third ArenaBowl. The game featured the #2 Pittsburgh Gladiators against the #1 Detroit Drive. Both teams finished their seasons at 3–1, yet the Drive greatly led in points against (84–147). With the win, the Detroit Drive became the first franchise in Arena Football League history to win two consecutive ArenaBowls.

== Game summary ==
In the first quarter, Detroit drew first blood with OL-DL Reggie Mathis sacking Gladiators quarterback Willie Totten in the end zone for a safety, while Drive quarterback Tony Burris got a 1-yard quarterback sneak run for a touchdown. Pittsburgh kicker Rusty Fricke made a 55-yard field goal, and Detroit responded with FB-LB Lynn Bradford's 17-yard touchdown run.

In the second quarter, the Drive increased its lead with kicker Novo Bojovic's 50-yard field goal, yet the Gladiators refused to go down with Fricke getting a 30-yard field goal. Bradford made a two-yard touchdown run, yet Pittsburgh responded with FB-LB Mike Powell's two-yard touchdown run (with a failed two-point conversion).

In the third quarter, the Gladiators drew closer with WR/DB Cornelius Ross returning a fumble 23 yards for a touchdown, yet the Drive responded with Burris completing a 32-yard touchdown pass to OS George LaFrance (with a failed PAT) and a 12-yard touchdown pass to WR/DB Gary Mullen.

Pittsburgh would respond with Totten completing a 19-yard touchdown pass to WR-DB Brian Gardner, yet afterwards, Detroit's defense held the Gladiators down for the rest of the game.

With the win, the Drive became the first team in Arena Football history to win back-to-back ArenaBowls.

== Scoring summary ==
1st Quarter

- DET - Safety
- DET - Burris 1 run (Bojovic kick)
- PIT - FG Fricke 55
- DET - Bradford 17 run (Bojovic kick)

2nd Quarter

- DET - FG Bojovic 50
- PIT - FG Fricke 30
- DET - Bradford 2 run (Bojovic kick)
- PIT - Powell 2 run (Totten pass failed)

3rd Quarter

- PIT - Ross 23 Fumble Return (Fricke kick)
- DET - LaFrance 32 pass from Burris (Bojovic kick failed)
- DET - Mullen 12 pass from Burris (Bojovic kick)
- PIT - Gardner 19 pass from Totten (Fricke kick)
