= 1991 Tampa Bay Storm season =

Arena Football League team season

- Owner: Bob Gries
- Head coach: Fran Curci
- Home stadium: Florida Suncoast Dome

Results
- Record: 8–2
- Division place: 2nd
- Playoffs: Won Semi-Finals (Dynamite) 40-13; Won ArenaBowl V (Drive) 48–42

The 1991 Tampa Bay Storm season was the fifth season for the Arena Football League franchise, and its first season as the Tampa Bay Storm. The team was sold to Bob Gries in 1990, and he quickly moved the team from Pittsburgh, Pennsylvania to St. Petersburg, Florida. The team played their home games at the Florida Suncoast Dome.

== Regular season ==
=== Schedule ===
Week	Date	Opponent	Results		Game site
Week	Date	Opponent	Final score	Team record	Game site
1	June 1	Orlando Predators	L 38–51	0–1	Florida Suncoast Dome
2	June 8	at Columbus Thunderbolts	W 53–12	1–1	Ohio Expo Center Coliseum
3	June 15	at New Orleans Night	W 27–17	2–1	Louisiana Superdome
4	June 22	Dallas Texans	W 56–48	3–1	Florida Suncoast Dome
5	June 29	Albany Firebirds	W 57–53	4–1	Florida Suncoast Dome
6	July 8	at Detroit Drive	W 38–29	5–1	Joe Louis Arena
7	July 13	Denver Dynamite	W 30–13	6–1	Florida Suncoast Dome
8	July 19	at Denver Dynamite	L 34–51	6–2	McNichols Sports Arena
9	July 27	at Orlando Predators	W 26–16	7–2	Orlando Arena
10	August 2	New Orleans Night	W 62–19	8–2	Florida Suncoast Dome

=== Standings ===
1991 Arena Football League standings
Team	W	L	T	PCT	PF	PA	PF (Avg.)	PA (Avg.)	STK
xy-Detroit Drive	9	1	0	.900	437	262	43.7	26.2	W 4
x-Tampa Bay Storm	8	2	0	.800	421	309	42.1	30.9	W 2
x-Denver Dynamite	6	4	0	.600	389	365	38.9	36.5	L 1
x-Albany Firebirds	6	4	0	.600	427	342	42.7	34.2	W 1
New Orleans Night	4	6	0	.400	314	401	31.4	40.1	L 1
Dallas Texans	4	6	0	.400	286	334	28.6	33.4	W 1
Orlando Predators	3	7	0	.300	321	363	32.1	36.3	L 2
Columbus Thunderbolts	0	10	0	.000	241	460	24.1	46	L 10

y – clinched regular-season title

x – clinched playoff spot

== Playoffs ==
Round	Date	Opponent	Results		Game site
Round	Date	Opponent	Final score	Team record	Game site
Semi-finals	August 9	Denver Dynamite	W 40–13	1–0	Florida Suncoast Dome
ArenaBowl V	August 17	at Detroit Drive	W 48–42	2–0	Joe Louis Arena

== Roster ==
1991 Tampa Bay Storm roster
Quarterbacks: -- John Darnell; 5 Chip Ferguson; 7 Jay Gruden; Wide Receivers/Defensive Backs: 82 Brad Calip; -- Rawland Crawford, Jr.; -- Kevin Guidry; -- Anthony Howard; -- Tony Jones; 29 Thomas Monroe; 20 Stevie Thomas; 1 Darren Willis; -- Tony Young	Running Backs/Linebackers: -- Andre Bowden; -- Lynn Bradford; 32 Bo Wright; -- Marc Zeno; Offensive Linemen/Defensive Linemen: -- Reid Bennett; -- Keith Browner; -- Tom Gizzi; -- Jeff Mayes; -- Robert Smith; 65 Pat Sperduto; 75 Dan Tarabella; 55 Carl Watts; -- Adrian Wright	Defensive Specialists: 24 Tracey Perkins; Kickers: -- Paul Hickert; Rookies in italics Roster updated March 20, 2013; 27 Active, 0 Inactive, 0 PS → More rosters

== Awards ==
Position	Player	Award	All-Arena team
Head coach	Fran Curci	Coach of the Year	–
Fullback/Linebacker	Lynn Bradford	none	1st
Offensive/Defensive Lineman	Tom Gizzi	none	2nd
