= 1991 Detroit Drive season =

Arena Football League team season

- Head coach: Tim Marcum
- Home stadium: Joe Louis Arena

Results
- Record: 9–1
- Division place: 1st
- Playoffs: Won Semi-Finals (Firebirds) 37-35; Lost ArenaBowl V (Storm) 42–48
- Team MVP: George LaFrance

The 1991 Detroit Drive season was the fourth season for the Drive. They finished 9–1 and lost ArenaBowl V.

== Regular season ==
=== Schedule ===
Week	Date	Opponent	Results		Game site
Week	Date	Opponent	Final score	Team record	Game site
1	May 13	at Denver Dynamite	W 31–13	1–0	McNichols Sports Arena
2	June 7	Orlando Predators	W 56–27	2–0	Joe Louis Arena
3	June 15	at Albany Firebirds	W 43–42	3–0	Knickerbocker Arena
4	June 21	at Orlando Predators	W 43–40 (OT)	4–0	Orlando Arena
5	June 27	New Orleans Night	W 45–22	5–0	Joe Louis Arena
6	July 8	Tampa Bay Storm	L 29–38	5–1	Joe Louis Arena
7	July 13	at Dallas Texans	W 38–13	6–1	Reunion Arena
8	July 19	at Columbus Thunderbolts	W 56–20	7–1	Ohio Expo Center Coliseum
9	July 26	Dallas Texans	W 36–10	8–1	Joe Louis Arena
10	August 2	Denver Dynamite	W 60–37	9–1	Joe Louis Arena

=== Standings ===
1991 Arena Football League standings
Team	W	L	T	PCT	PF	PA	PF (Avg.)	PA (Avg.)	STK
xy-Detroit Drive	9	1	0	.900	437	262	43.7	26.2	W 4
x-Tampa Bay Storm	8	2	0	.800	421	309	42.1	30.9	W 2
x-Denver Dynamite	6	4	0	.600	389	365	38.9	36.5	L 1
x-Albany Firebirds	6	4	0	.600	427	342	42.7	34.2	W 1
New Orleans Night	4	6	0	.400	314	401	31.4	40.1	L 1
Dallas Texans	4	6	0	.400	286	334	28.6	33.4	W 1
Orlando Predators	3	7	0	.300	321	363	32.1	36.3	L 2
Columbus Thunderbolts	0	10	0	.000	241	460	24.1	46	L 10

y – clinched regular-season title

x – clinched playoff spot

== Playoffs ==
Round	Date	Opponent	Results		Game site
Round	Date	Opponent	Final score	Team record	Game site
Semi-finals	August 9	Albany Firebirds	W 37–35	1–0	Joe Louis Arena
ArenaBowl V	August 17	Tampa Bay Storm	L 42–48	1–1	Joe Louis Arena

== Roster ==
1991 Detroit Drive roster
Quarterbacks: -- Ron Adams; 7 Art Schlichter; -- John Witkowski; Wide receivers/Defensive backs: 88 Dwayne Dixon; -- David Evans; -- Jitter Fields; -- Larry Hargrove; 27 George LaFrance; 1 Gary Mullen; -- Rodney Richmond	Running backs/Linebackers: -- Aric Anderson; 44 Alvin Rettig; Offensive linemen/Defensive linemen: -- Bruce Clark; 88 John Corker; -- Flint Fleming; -- William Harris; -- Ted Hennings; -- Troy Knight; 62 Jon Roehlk; -- Steve Slay	Wide Receivers/Linebackers: -- Greg Fitzpatrick; -- Will McClay; -- Tate Randle; Kickers: 3 Novo Bojovic; Rookies in italics Roster updated March 20, 2013; 24 Active, 0 Inactive, 0 PS

== Awards ==
Position	Player	Award	All-Arena team
Wide Receiver/Defensive Back	George LaFrance	Most Valuable Player	1st
Offensive/Defensive Lineman	John Corker	Lineman of the Year	1st
Defensive Specialist	Tate Randle	none	1st
Quarterback	Art Schlichter	none	2nd
Wide Receiver/Defensive Back	Gary Mullen	none	2nd
Fullback/Linebacker	Alvin Rettig	none	2nd
Offensive/Defensive Lineman	Flint Fleming	none	2nd
