= 1991 Columbus Thunderbolts season =

Arena Football League team season

- Owner: Joe Marsalka
- Head coach: Dave Whinham
- Home stadium: Ohio Expo Center Coliseum

Results
- Record: 0–10
- Division place: 8th
- Playoffs: Did not qualify

The 1991 Columbus Thunderbolts season was the 1st season for the franchise. They were formed as part of an expansion for 1991. They went 0–10 and missed the playoffs. They were the second team to complete a winless season in the AFL, the first being the 1989 Maryland Commandos.

== Regular season ==
=== Schedule ===
Week	Date	Opponent	Results		Venue
Week	Date	Opponent	Score	Record	Venue
1	June 1	Dallas Texans	L 12–33	0–1	Ohio Expo Center Coliseum
2	June 8	Tampa Bay Storm	L 12–53	0–2	Ohio Expo Center Coliseum
3	June 13	at Orlando Predators	L 32–38	0–3	Orlando Arena
4	June 22	Albany Firebirds	L 17–34	0–4	Ohio Expo Center Coliseum
5	June 29	at Dallas Texans	L 26–38	0–5	Reunion Arena
6	July 6	Denver Dynamite	L 44–52	0–6	Ohio Expo Center Coliseum
7	July 13	at New Orleans Night	L 15–47	0–7	Louisiana Superdome
8	July 19	Detroit Drive	L 20–56	0–8	Ohio Expo Center Coliseum
9	July 26	at Denver Dynamite	L 46–52 (OT)	0–9	McNichols Sports Arena
10	August 3	at Albany Firebirds	L 17–57	0–10	Knickerbocker Arena

=== Standings ===
1991 Arena Football League standings
Team	W	L	T	PCT	PF	PA	PF (Avg.)	PA (Avg.)	STK
xy-Detroit Drive	9	1	0	.900	437	262	43.7	26.2	W 4
x-Tampa Bay Storm	8	2	0	.800	421	309	42.1	30.9	W 2
x-Denver Dynamite	6	4	0	.600	389	365	38.9	36.5	L 1
x-Albany Firebirds	6	4	0	.600	427	342	42.7	34.2	W 1
New Orleans Night	4	6	0	.400	314	401	31.4	40.1	L 1
Dallas Texans	4	6	0	.400	286	334	28.6	33.4	W 1
Orlando Predators	3	7	0	.300	321	363	32.1	36.3	L 2
Columbus Thunderbolts	0	10	0	.000	241	460	24.1	46	L 10

y – clinched regular-season title

x – clinched playoff spot

== Roster ==
1991 Columbus Thunderbolts roster
Quarterbacks: -- Bryan Brock; -- Major Harris; -- Ken Lutz; -- Milton McGriggs; Wide Receivers/Defensive Backs: -- Robert Banks; -- Darryl Gard; -- Steve Griffin; -- Darrell Grymes; -- Keith Mullen; -- Ray Puryear	Fullbacks/Linebackers: -- Carey Brown; -- George Cooper; -- Duane "D.C." Crenshaw; -- Bryon Lee; -- Vince Munlin; -- Billy Poe; Offensive Linemen/Defensive Linemen: -- Zach Barnes; -- Karl Coles; -- John Dixon; -- Luther Johnson; -- Tom Krumrine; -- Andrew Marlatt; -- Rickey Newman; -- Stan Rykowski	Wide Receivers/Linebackers: -- Marvin Bowman; -- Tony Missick; Kickers: -- Matt Frantz; -- Carlos Mateos; -- Pat O'Morrow; Rookies in italics Roster updated March 22, 2013; 29 Active, 0 Inactive, 0 PS → More rosters
