= 1991 Denver Dynamite season =

Arena Football League team season

- Owner: Gary Graham
- Head coach: Babe Parilli
- Home stadium: McNichols Sports Arena

Results
- Record: 6–4
- Division place: 3rd
- Playoffs: Lost semi-finals (Storm) 13-40

The 1991 Denver Dynamite season was the fourth, and what would be the final, season for the Arena Football League franchise. Despite the financial turmoil that occurred the season before, the Dynamite once again fielded a team in 1991. The team finished 6–4 during the regular season, again clinching the 3rd seed for the playoffs. The team lost to the relocated Gladiators, who became the Tampa Bay Storm, in the semi-finals. After the season, the franchise filed for bankruptcy after being sued by their public relations firm. When he learned of the situation in Denver, AFL commissioner, Jim Foster has this to say, "Three things can happen. One, he finds a buyer, or we find him a buyer, and the team stays in Denver. Two, a buyer is found and moves to another city. Three, no one is interested and the franchise goes down." The Dynamite went up for sale, but with the city trying to attract investors to land a Major League Baseball franchise (Colorado Rockies), the team did not attract potential buyers.

== Regular season ==
=== Schedule ===
Week	Date	Opponent	Results		Venue
Week	Date	Opponent	Score	Record	Venue
1	May 31	Detroit Drive	L 13–31	0–1	McNichols Sports Arena
2	June 7	Albany Firebirds	W 51–27	1–1	McNichols Sports Arena
3	June 14	at Dallas Texans	L 27–30	1–2	Reunion Arena
4	June 22	at New Orleans Night	W 54–44	2–2	Louisiana Superdome
5	June 29	Orlando Predators	W 39–19	3–2	McNichols Sports Arena
6	July 6	at Columbus Thunderbolts	W 52–44	4–2	Ohio Expo Center Coliseum
7	July 13	at Tampa Bay Storm	L 13–30	4–3	Florida Suncoast Dome
8	July 19	Tampa Bay Storm	W 51–34	5–3	McNichols Sports Arena
9	July 26	Columbus Thunderbolts	W 52–46	6–3	McNichols Sports Arena
10	August 2	at Detroit Drive	L 37–60	6–4	Joe Louis Arena

=== Standings ===
1991 Arena Football League standings
Team	W	L	T	PCT	PF	PA	PF (Avg.)	PA (Avg.)	STK
xy-Detroit Drive	9	1	0	.900	437	262	43.7	26.2	W 4
x-Tampa Bay Storm	8	2	0	.800	421	309	42.1	30.9	W 2
x-Denver Dynamite	6	4	0	.600	389	365	38.9	36.5	L 1
x-Albany Firebirds	6	4	0	.600	427	342	42.7	34.2	W 1
New Orleans Night	4	6	0	.400	314	401	31.4	40.1	L 1
Dallas Texans	4	6	0	.400	286	334	28.6	33.4	W 1
Orlando Predators	3	7	0	.300	321	363	32.1	36.3	L 2
Columbus Thunderbolts	0	10	0	.000	241	460	24.1	46	L 10

y – clinched regular-season title

x – clinched playoff spot

== Playoffs ==
Round	Date	Opponent	Results		Game site
Round	Date	Opponent	Final score	Team record	Game site
Semi-finals	August 9	at Tampa Bay Storm	L 13–40	0–1	Florida Suncoast Dome

== Roster ==
1991 Denver Dynamite roster
Quarterbacks: 7 Mike Hold, Jr.; -- Greg Freeman; Wide Receivers/Defensive Backs: 32 Frank Bianchini; -- Reggie Brown; 27 Wayne Coffey; 88 Fred Dussett; 55 Bart Schuchts; -- Cedric Tillman; 5 Alvin Williams	Running Backs/Linebackers: -- Willie Cannon; 44 John El-Masry; 3 Marshall Foreman; Offensive Linemen/Defensive Linemen: -- Tim Adams; 62 Mike Freeman; -- Aualofa Ili; 73 Joe March; 89 Jon Norris; -- David Smith; -- Jim Spady; -- Mitch Young	Wide Receivers/Linebackers: 20 Gerald Abraham; -- Troy Long; Kickers: 1 Rusty Fricke; Rookies in italics Roster updated January 23, 2013; 23 Active, 0 Inactive, 0 PS → More rosters
