= 1991 Albany Firebirds season =

Arena Football League team season

- Head coach: Rick Buffington
- Home stadium: Knickerbocker Arena

Results
- Record: 6–4
- Division place: 4th
- Playoffs: Lost semi-finals (Drive) 35-37

The 1991 Albany Firebirds season was the second season for the Firebirds. They finished 6–4.

== Regular season ==
=== Schedule ===
Game	Date	Opponent	Results		Venue
Game	Date	Opponent	Score	Record	Venue
1	June 1	New Orleans Night	W 45–20	1–0	Knickerbocker Arena
2	June 7	at Denver Dynamite	L 27–51	1–1	McNichols Sports Arena
3	June 15	Detroit Drive	L 42–43	1–2	Knickerbocker Arena
4	June 22	at Columbus Thunderbolts	W 34–17	2–2	Ohio Expo Center Coliseum
5	June 29	at Tampa Bay Storm	L 53–57	2–3	Florida Suncoast Dome
6	July 6	Orlando Predators	W 44–36	3–3	Knickerbocker Arena
7	July 12	at Orlando Predators	W 28–25	4–3	Orlando Arena
8	July 20	Dallas Texans	W 48–26	5–3	Knickerbocker Arena
9	July 27	at New Orleans Night	L 49–50	5–4	Louisiana Superdome
10	August 3	Columbus Thunderbolts	W 57–17	6–4	Knickerbocker Arena

=== Standings ===
1991 Arena Football League standings
Team	W	L	T	PCT	PF	PA	PF (Avg.)	PA (Avg.)	STK
xy-Detroit Drive	9	1	0	.900	437	262	43.7	26.2	W 4
x-Tampa Bay Storm	8	2	0	.800	421	309	42.1	30.9	W 2
x-Denver Dynamite	6	4	0	.600	389	365	38.9	36.5	L 1
x-Albany Firebirds	6	4	0	.600	427	342	42.7	34.2	W 1
New Orleans Night	4	6	0	.400	314	401	31.4	40.1	L 1
Dallas Texans	4	6	0	.400	286	334	28.6	33.4	W 1
Orlando Predators	3	7	0	.300	321	363	32.1	36.3	L 2
Columbus Thunderbolts	0	10	0	.000	241	460	24.1	46	L 10

y – clinched regular-season title

x – clinched playoff spot

== Playoffs ==
Round	Date	Opponent	Results		Venue
Round	Date	Opponent	Score	Record	Venue
Semi-finals	August 9	at Detroit Drive	L 35–37	0–1	Joe Louis Arena

== Roster ==
1991 Albany Firebirds roster
Quarterbacks: 8 Tom Porras; -- Ed Rubbert; Wide Receivers/Defensive Backs: -- Richard Huff; -- Myron Jefferson; 27 Merv Mosely; -- Tony Slaton; -- Steve Thonn	Running Backs/Linebackers: -- Jeff Blankenship; 33 Alvin Blount; -- Dave Jakob; Offensive Linemen/Defensive Linemen: 77 Sylvester Bembery; -- John Chaney; -- Rod Ferguson; 75 Chuck Harris; -- John Levelis; -- Jeff Neal; 73 Pete Porcelli; -- Rodney Smith; -- Jeff Sniffen; -- John Zinser	Wide Receivers/Linebackers: 84 Fred Gayles; -- Darryl Hammond; -- Garland Rivers; 87 Curt Reed; -- Fred Smalls; Kickers: -- Gary Gussman; -- Chris Kolodziey; Rookies in italics Roster updated March 20, 2013; 27 Active, 0 Inactive, 0 PS → More rosters

== Awards ==
Position	Player	Award	All-Arena team
Quarterback	Tom Porras	none	1st
Offensive/Defensive Lineman	Sylvester Bembery	none	1st
Wide Receiver/Defensive Back	Merv Mosely	none	2nd
Wide Receiver/Defensive Back	Fred Gayles	none	2nd
