= 1991 New Orleans Night season =

Arena Football League team season

- Head coach: Eddie Khayat
- Home stadium: Louisiana Superdome

Results
- Record: 4–6
- Division place: 5th
- Playoffs: did not qualify

The 1991 New Orleans Night season was the 1st season for the franchise. They were formed as part of an expansion for 1991. They went 4–6 and missed the playoffs.

== Regular season ==
=== Schedule ===
Week	Date	Opponent	Results		Game site
Week	Date	Opponent	Final score	Team record	Game site
1	June 1	at Albany Firebirds	L 20–45	0–1	Times Union Center
2	June 8	at Dallas Texans	W 27–23	1–1	Reunion Arena
3	June 15	Tampa Bay Storm	L 17–27	1–2	Louisiana Superdome
4	June 22	Denver Dynamite	L 44–54	1–3	Louisiana Superdome
5	June 27	at Detroit Drive	L 22–45	1–4	Joe Louis Arena
6	July 5	Dallas Texans	W 39–37	2–4	Louisiana Superdome
7	July 13	Columbus Thunderbolts	W 47–15	3–4	Louisiana Superdome
8	July 19	at Orlando Predators	L 29–44	3–5	Orlando Arena
9	July 27	Albany Firebirds	W 50–49	4–5	Louisiana Superdome
10	August 2	at Tampa Bay Storm	L 19–62	4–6	Florida Suncoast Dome

=== Standings ===
1991 Arena Football League standings
Team	W	L	T	PCT	PF	PA	PF (Avg.)	PA (Avg.)	STK
xy-Detroit Drive	9	1	0	.900	437	262	43.7	26.2	W 4
x-Tampa Bay Storm	8	2	0	.800	421	309	42.1	30.9	W 2
x-Denver Dynamite	6	4	0	.600	389	365	38.9	36.5	L 1
x-Albany Firebirds	6	4	0	.600	427	342	42.7	34.2	W 1
New Orleans Night	4	6	0	.400	314	401	31.4	40.1	L 1
Dallas Texans	4	6	0	.400	286	334	28.6	33.4	W 1
Orlando Predators	3	7	0	.300	321	363	32.1	36.3	L 2
Columbus Thunderbolts	0	10	0	.000	241	460	24.1	46	L 10

y – clinched regular-season title

x – clinched playoff spot

== Roster ==
1991 New Orleans Night roster
Quarterbacks: 17 Mickey Guidry; 15 James Harvey; 10 Willie Totten; Wide Receivers/Defensive Backs: -- Robert Allen; 1 Milton Barney; 88 Marvin Cephus; 26 Jackie Cooper; 7 Willie Culpepper; 29 Jerome McIntosh; 88 Marcell Smith; 5 Jim Young	Running Backs/Linebackers: 44 Troy Fields; 32 Mark Mason; Offensive Linemen/Defensive Linemen: 84 Eric Bias; 75 Jim Bishop; 87 Fred Davis; 50 Glenn Haisley; 65 Walter Housman; 55 Johnny Sims; 73 Donald Thompson	Wide Receivers/Linebackers: 20 Anthony Anderson; 27 Robert Goins; 27 Jack Phillips; Kickers: 3 Marco Morales; Rookies in italics Roster updated March 15, 2013; 23 Active, 0 Inactive, 0 PS → More rosters

== Awards ==
Position	Player	Award	All-Arena team
Wide Receiver/Defensive Back	Milton Barney	Ironman of the Year	1st
Offensive/Defensive Lineman	Johnny Sims	none	2nd
Kicker	Marco Morales	none	2nd

== Coaching ==
Eddie Khayat was the first head coach of the Night.
