= 1991 Dallas Texans season =

Arena Football League team season

1991 Dallas Texans (arena football) season
- Owner: Lainer Richey
- Head coach: Drew Pearson
- Home stadium: Reunion Arena

Results
- Record: 4–6
- Division place: 6th
- Playoffs: did not qualify

The 1991 Dallas Texans season was the second season for the Texans. They finished with a record of 4–6.

== Regular season ==
=== Schedule ===
Week	Date	Opponent	Results		Venue
Week	Date	Opponent	Score	Record	Venue
1	June 1	at Columbus Thunderbolts	W 33–12	1–0	Ohio Expo Center Coliseum
2	June 8	New Orleans Night	L 17–23	1–1	Reunion Arena
3	June 14	Denver Dynamite	W 30–27	2–1	Reunion Arena
4	June 22	at Tampa Bay Storm	L 48–56	2–2	Florida Suncoast Dome
5	June 29	Columbus Thunderbolts	W 38–26	3–2	Reunion Arena
6	July 5	at New Orleans Night	L 37–39	3–3	Louisiana Superdome
7	July 13	Detroit Drive	L 13–38	3–4	Reunion Arena
8	July 20	at Albany Firebirds	L 26–48	3–5	Knickerbocker Arena
9	July 26	at Detroit Drive	L 10–36	3–6	Joe Louis Arena
10	August 3	Orlando Predators	W 28–25 (OT)	4–6	Reunion Arena

=== Standings ===
1991 Arena Football League standings
Team	W	L	T	PCT	PF	PA	PF (Avg.)	PA (Avg.)	STK
xy-Detroit Drive	9	1	0	.900	437	262	43.7	26.2	W 4
x-Tampa Bay Storm	8	2	0	.800	421	309	42.1	30.9	W 2
x-Denver Dynamite	6	4	0	.600	389	365	38.9	36.5	L 1
x-Albany Firebirds	6	4	0	.600	427	342	42.7	34.2	W 1
New Orleans Night	4	6	0	.400	314	401	31.4	40.1	L 1
Dallas Texans	4	6	0	.400	286	334	28.6	33.4	W 1
Orlando Predators	3	7	0	.300	321	363	32.1	36.3	L 2
Columbus Thunderbolts	0	10	0	.000	241	460	24.1	46	L 10

y – clinched regular-season title

x – clinched playoff spot

== Roster ==
1991 Dallas Texans roster
Quarterbacks: 12 Alfred Jenkins; 15 Mickey Russell; Wide Receivers/Defensive Backs: 84 Carl Aikens, Jr.; -- Craig Alexander; 29 Mark Jackson; 80 Jeff Jenkins; 26 Aatron Kenney; -- Tony Newsom	Fullbacks/Linebackers: -- Jeff Alexander; -- Jeff Atkins; -- Smiley Elmore; 32 Sloan Hood; 44 Mitchell Ward; Offensive Linemen/Defensive Linemen: -- Arnold Campbell; 82 Gary Costar; 66 Frank Denard; -- Pete Endre; 89 Frank Harris; 65 Jeff Hurd; -- Allen Roulette; -- Keith Williams; 70 Buddy Wyatt	Wide Receivers/Linebackers: -- Gerald Bradley; -- Reggie Davis; 88 Sam Moore; -- Alex Morris; Kickers: 1 Jim Power; Rookies in italics Roster updated March 21, 2013; 27 Active, 0 Inactive, 0 PS → More rosters

== Awards ==
Position	Player	Award	All-Arena team
Wide Receiver/Defensive Back	Sam Moore	none	1st
