= Willie Culpepper =

American football player (born 1967)

No. 81, 2, 1
- Position: Wide receiver

Personal information
- Born: March 27, 1967 (age 59); Jacksonville, Florida, U.S.
- Listed height: 5 ft 11 in (1.80 m)
- Listed weight: 155 lb (70 kg)

Career information
- High school: Jean Ribault (Jacksonville)
- College: Southwestern Louisiana (1985–1988)
- NFL draft: 1989: undrafted

Career history
- New Orleans Night (1991); Tampa Bay Buccaneers (1992); Cleveland Thunderbolts (1993); Saskatchewan Roughriders (1993); Albany Firebirds (1995–1996); Connecticut Coyotes (1996); New York CityHawks (1997)*; San Jose SaberCats (1997); Buffalo Destroyers (2000)
- * Offseason or practice squad member only
- Stats at Pro Football Reference
- Stats at ArenaFan.com

Willie James Culpepper (born March 27, 1967) is an American former professional football player who was a wide receiver for one season with the Tampa Bay Buccaneers of the National Football League (NFL). He played college football for the Southwestern Louisiana Ragin' Cajuns, setting school records in career receiving yards and single-game receiving yards. After two seasons away from football, he signed with the New Orleans Night of the Arena Football League (AFL) in 1991 after an open tryout. After finishing second in the AFL in receptions, Culpepper signed with the Buccaneers. He played in three games for Tampa Bay as a reserve receiver but did not catch a pass. He later played for the Saskatchewan Roughriders of the Canadian Football League (CFL) and for several other AFL teams. Culpepper was noted for his skinny frame at 155 pounds (70 kg) and for his speed.

== Early life and college ==
Willie James Culpepper was born on March 27, 1967, in Jacksonville, Florida. He attended Jean Ribault High School in Jacksonville. Culpepper was a four-year letterman for the Southwestern Louisiana Ragin' Cajuns of the University of Southwestern Louisiana from 1985 to 1988. He caught 105 passes for a school record 1,968 yards during his college career. He also had a school record 220 receiving yards in a game in 1986. Culpepper participated in track and field in college as well.

== Professional career ==
Culpepper was completing his degree in architecture from Southwestern Louisiana when a former college teammate of his called and told him about the New Orleans Night of the Arena Football League (AFL) holding a tryout at the Superdome. Culpepper attended the tryout, and was signed by the Night on May 9, 1991. He was a wide receiver/defensive back during his time in the AFL as the league played under ironman rules. He played in nine games for the Night during the 1991 season, recording 60 receptions for 773 yards and eight touchdowns, four solo tackles, two assisted tackles, one pass breakup, and nine kick returns for 111 yards as New Orleans went 4–6. His 60 catches were the second best in the league that year.

Culpepper was signed by the Tampa Bay Buccaneers of the National Football League (NFL) on February 18, 1992, joining Night head coach Ed Khayat in Tampa Bay. Culpepper caught a touchdown during the preseason. He was released on August 31, signed to the team's practice squad the next day, released again on September 16, and signed to the practice squad again on September 29. He was promoted to the active roster on October 16 due to the team having injury problems at receiver. On October 21 against the Chicago Bears, Culpepper ran a poor route that caused Vinny Testaverde to throw an interception. While with the Buccaneers, Culpepper was noted for his skinny frame at 155 pounds (70 kg). He played in three games overall for Tampa Bay during the 1992 season but did not record a catch and was released on November 6, 1992. He re-signed with the Buccaneers in January 1993 but was later released for the final time in April 1993.

On March 16, 1993, Culpepper's AFL rights were acquired by the Cleveland Thunderbolts in an allocation draft due to the Night having folded. He played in the 1993 season opener for the Thunderbolts, catching a team-leading four passes for 43 yards and one touchdown while also posting one solo tackle.

Culpepper left the Thunderbolts to sign with the Saskatchewan Roughriders of the Canadian Football League (CFL) in May 1993. After signing with the Roughriders, Culpepper noted that he had "gone from the smallest field in football (arena football) to the largest one (Canadian football)." His main attribute as a player was his speed. He reportedly had a 4.3 second 40-yard dash in June 1993. Culpepper began the 1993 CFL season on the practice roster. He was promoted to the active roster in August as a replacement for Byron Williams. Culpepper made his CFL debut on August 11 against the Ottawa Rough Riders, catching five passes for 85 yards and one touchdown. He dressed in three games for the Roughriders in 1993, recording six receptions for 95 yards and one touchdown, two kickoff returns for 42 yards, and two punt returns for 16 yards. However, he was sidelined due to a shoulder issue and recurring headaches. Culpepper was released by Saskatchewan on October 19, 1993.

Culpepper signed with the Albany Firebirds of the AFL on April 24, 1995. He played in all 12 games for the Firebirds during the 1995 season, totaling 48 catches for 658 yards and 14 touchdowns, 28 solo tackles, five assisted tackles, three interceptions for 22 yards and one touchdown, five pass breakups, and nine kick returns for 102 yards. Albany finished the year with a 7–5 record and lost in the semifinals to the Tampa Bay Storm by a score of 56–49. Culpepper appeared in nine games for Albany in 1996, accumulating 20 receptions for 419 yards and nine touchdowns, six solo tackles, five assisted tackles, two interceptions, three pass breakups, and one forced fumble. In July 1996, he requested his release from the Firebirds, stating that he did not feel wanted and that his minutes had decreased. Culpepper also stated "They fined me for dropping a pass in practice. It was getting a little too ridiculous." He was granted his release by Albany in July 1996.

Culpepper was then claimed off waivers by the Connecticut Coyotes, who needed a receiver after Larry Ray Willis suffered an injury and Wayne Morris received a tryout with the NFL's New York Jets. Culpepper played in two games for the Coyotes during the 1996 season, catching 13 passes for 193 yards and two touchdowns. The Coyotes folded after the 1996 season.

In November 1996, Culpepper was selected by the AFL's New York CityHawks in a dispersal draft. On April 8, 1997, he was traded to the San Jose SaberCats for Kip Texada. Culpepper played in 11 games for the SaberCats in 1997, recording 48 receptions for 732 yards and 11 touchdowns, 12 solo tackles, seven assisted tackles, one interception for 47 yards, one pass breakup, and one fumble recovery. San Jose finished the 1997 season with an 8–6 record and lost in the quarterfinals to the Iowa Barnstormers by a margin of 68–59. In April 1998, it was reported that Culpepper had failed to report to the team. He was officially waived by the SaberCats the next year on April 6, 1999.

Culpepper returned to the AFL in 2000, signing with the Buffalo Destroyers on March 22, 2000. He was placed on injured reserve on April 11, activated on April 26, and placed on injured reserve again on May 31, 2000. Overall, he played in two games during the 2000 season, catching six passes for 99 yards while also posting seven solo tackles, one assisted tackle, and two pass breakups.
