= Greg Freeman (American football) =

American football player

No. 7
- Position: Quarterback

Personal information
- Listed height: 6 ft 2 in (1.88 m)
- Listed weight: 220 lb (100 kg)

Career information
- College: Tiffin (OH)
- NFL draft: 1988: undrafted

Career history
- Denver Dynamite (1991); New Orleans Night (1992); Cleveland Thunderbolts (1993)

Career AFL statistics
- Comp. / Att.: 49 / 101
- Passing yards: 622
- TD–INT: 10–9
- QB rating: 55.80
- Rushing TDs: 1
- Stats at ArenaFan.com

Greg Freeman is an American former professional football quarterback who played three seasons in the Arena Football League (AFL) with the Denver Dynamite, New Orleans Night and Cleveland Thunderbolts. He played college football at Tiffin University.

== College career ==
Freeman played for the Tiffin Dragons in their first seasons from 1985 to 1987. He recorded 305 completions on 4,075 passing yards. He was a two-time All-District 22 selection. Freeman also recorded 2,210 yards in a single season and 475 yards in a game.

== Professional career ==
Freeman placed 12th out of 25 quarterbacks at the NFL Scouting Combine in 1988. He played in ten games for the Denver Dynamite of the Arena Football League (AFL) in 1991, recording three pass attempts, three rushes for 11 yards, and one solo tackle. He played in ten games for the New Orleans Night of the AFL in 1992, completing 44 of 88 passes (50.0%) for 535 yards, nine touchdowns, and nine interceptions while also rushing nine times for 41 yards and a touchdown. Freeman appeared in two games for the Cleveland Thunderbolts of the AFL in 1993, totaling five completions on ten passing attempts for 87 yards and one touchdown, two carries for seven yards, and one solo tackle.

== Post-playing career ==
Freeman founded American Glass in Denver, Colorado after his playing career.
