= Raising Cane's River Center =

Entertainment venue in Baton Rouge, Louisiana

Coordinates: 30.4448°N 91.1894°W

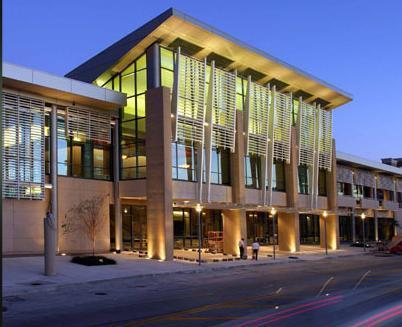
- Entrance to venue (c.2008)
- Interactive map of Raising Cane's River Center
- Former names: Baton Rouge River Center (2004–2016); Riverside Centroplex (1977–2004); Riverside Centroplex Arena and Convention Center (planning/construction)
- Location: Downtown/CBD
- Operator: SMG

Construction
- Renovated: 1993, 1998, 2003, 2004, 2011
- Cost: $13.7 million

Tenant
- Miss USA (2014–2015)

Raising Cane's River Center (originally named the Riverside Centroplex and later the Baton Rouge River Center) is an entertainment complex in downtown Baton Rouge, Louisiana. Opened in 1977, the complex includes: an arena, ballroom, exhibition center, theatre and library. The venue hosts over 500 events per year. In 2016, Raising Cane's Chicken Fingers signed a 10-year naming rights agreement for the River Center.

== Venues ==
=== Raising Cane's Exhibition Hall ===
The Exhibition Hall provides a total of 70,000 square feet (7,000 m^{2}) of convention or exhibit space after a 2011 expansion of an additional 10,000 sq ft (1,000 m^{2}). This can be combined with the arena to create more than 100,000 square feet (10,000 m^{2}) of contiguous convention or exhibit space.

=== Raising Cane's Grand Ballroom ===
The Grand Ballroom provides 26,150 square feet (2,429 m^{2}) of multi-purpose space.

=== River Center Theater for Performing Arts ===
The Theatre for Performing Arts provides seating for up to 1,999 people. It is home to Opera Louisiane, the Baton Rouge Ballet Theatre and the Baton Rouge Symphony Orchestra. It is also used for theatre performances and musicals.

=== Arena ===
The Raising Cane's River Center Arena presents concerts, sporting events, theater events, trade shows, and family shows, and has seating for up to 10,400 for concerts (both permanent and floor seats), 8,900 for sporting events (permanent seats), and 4,500 for theatre events.

==== Teams ====
- ECHL Baton Rouge Kingfish (1996–2003)
- EISL Baton Rouge Bombers (1997–1998)
- IPFL Louisiana Bayou Beast (1999)
- af2 Baton Rouge Blaze (2001)
- FPHL Baton Rouge Zydeco (2023-2026)
- FPHL Baton Rouge Kingfish (2026-present)

== Gallery ==
Former Riverside Centroplex logo

== See also ==
- List of concert halls
- List of convention centers in the United States
- List of music venues
- List of opera houses
- Theater in Louisiana

Events and tenants
Preceded by PH Live	Miss USA Venue; 2014–2015	Succeeded by T-Mobile Arena
Preceded by Palm Springs Convention Center	Miss Teen USA Venue; 2005	Succeeded by Palm Springs Convention Center
