= 1991 Orlando Predators season =

Arena Football League team season

- Head coach: Perry Moss
- Home stadium: Orlando Arena

Results
- Record: 3–7
- Division place: 7th
- Playoffs: Did not qualify

The 1991 Orlando Predators season was the 1st season for the franchise. They were formed as part of an expansion for 1991. They went 3–7 and missed the playoffs.

== Regular season ==
=== Schedule ===
Week	Date	Opponent	Results		Game site
Week	Date	Opponent	Final score	Team record	Game site
1	June 1	at Tampa Bay Storm	W 51–38	1–0	Florida Suncoast Dome
2	June 7	at Detroit Drive	L 27–56	1–1	Joe Louis Arena
3	June 13	Columbus Thunderbolts	W 38–32	2–1	Orlando Arena
4	June 21	Detroit Drive	L 40–43 (OT)	2–2	Orlando Arena
5	June 29	at Denver Dynamite	L 19–39	2–3	McNichols Sports Arena
6	July 6	at Albany Firebirds	L 36–44	2–4	Knickerbocker Arena
7	July 12	Albany Firebirds	L 25–28	2–5	Orlando Arena
8	July 19	New Orleans Night	W 44–29	3–5	Orlando Arena
9	July 27	Tampa Bay Storm	L 16–26	3–6	Orlando Arena
10	August 3	at Dallas Texans	L 25–28 (OT)	3–7	Reunion Arena

=== Standings ===
1991 Arena Football League standings
Team	W	L	T	PCT	PF	PA	PF (Avg.)	PA (Avg.)	STK
xy-Detroit Drive	9	1	0	.900	437	262	43.7	26.2	W 4
x-Tampa Bay Storm	8	2	0	.800	421	309	42.1	30.9	W 2
x-Denver Dynamite	6	4	0	.600	389	365	38.9	36.5	L 1
x-Albany Firebirds	6	4	0	.600	427	342	42.7	34.2	W 1
New Orleans Night	4	6	0	.400	314	401	31.4	40.1	L 1
Dallas Texans	4	6	0	.400	286	334	28.6	33.4	W 1
Orlando Predators	3	7	0	.300	321	363	32.1	36.3	L 2
Columbus Thunderbolts	0	10	0	.000	241	460	24.1	46	L 10

y – clinched regular-season title

x – clinched playoff spot

== Roster ==
1991 Orlando Predators roster
Quarterbacks: -- Larry Barretta; 5 Ben Bennett; -- Reggie Collier; Wide Receivers/Defensive Backs: -- Darrell Grymes; -- Daryl Hart; -- Lee McCormick; -- Bret Munsey; -- Duane Nash; 29 Durwood Roquemore; -- Reggie Smith; -- Herkie Walls	Fullbacks/Linebackers: -- Tony Collins; -- Russell Foster; -- Tommy Meyers; 15 Keith Williams; Offensive Linemen/Defensive Linemen: -- Dwight Bingham; -- Arnold Campbell; -- Quinton Knight; -- Gregg Swartwoudt; -- Doug Robb; -- Jeff Roth; -- Rusty Russell; -- Keith Smith; -- Keith Williams	Wide Receivers/Linebackers: -- Anthony Anderson; 84 Bryan Moore; -- Victor Scott; Kickers: 3 John Marxen; -- Dan Plocki; Rookies in italics Roster updated March 15, 2013; 23 Active, 0 Inactive, 0 PS → More rosters

== Awards ==
Position	Player	Award	All-Arena team
Offensive Specialist/Kick returner	Herkie Walls	–	2nd
