= Milton McGriggs =

American football quarterback

Profile
- Position: Quarterback

Personal information
- Listed height: 6 ft 1 in (1.85 m)
- Listed weight: 180 lb (82 kg)

Career information
- College: Fort Hays State
- NFL draft: 1990: undrafted

Career history
- Columbus Thunderbolts (1991)

Career AFL statistics
- Comp. / Att.: 12 / 23
- Passing yards: 70
- TD–INT: 0–0
- QB rating: 58.24
- Rushing TDs: 1
- Stats at ArenaFan.com

Milton McGriggs is an American former professional football quarterback who played one season with the Columbus Thunderbolts of the Arena Football League (AFL). He played college football at Fort Hays State University.

== Early life ==
McGriggs played college football for the Fort Hays State Tigers of Fort Hays State University. He started three games during his junior year as an option quarterback, completing 15 of 29 passes for 160 yards and two touchdowns. He was a starter and letterman as a senior in 1989 as well.

== Professional career ==
McGriggs signed with the Cleveland Thunderbolts of the Arena Football League on May 20, 1991. Due to an in injury to Bryan Brock, Harris started the June 13 game against the Orlando Predators but was replaced in the second half by Major Harris. McGriggs was placed on injured reserve, and later activated on July 25, 1991. He played in six games overall during the 1991 season, completing 12 of 23 passes (52.2%) for 70 yards on offense while also rushing seven times for 20 yards and one touchdown. On defense, he recorded nine solo tackles, one assisted tackle, two sacks, and one pass breakup.
