= McGriggs =

McGriggs is a surname. Notable people with the surname include:

- Lamar McGriggs (born 1968), American football player
- Milton McGriggs, American football player
