= Raising Cane's River Center Arena =

Arena in Louisiana, United States

Coordinates: 30.4448°N 91.1894°W

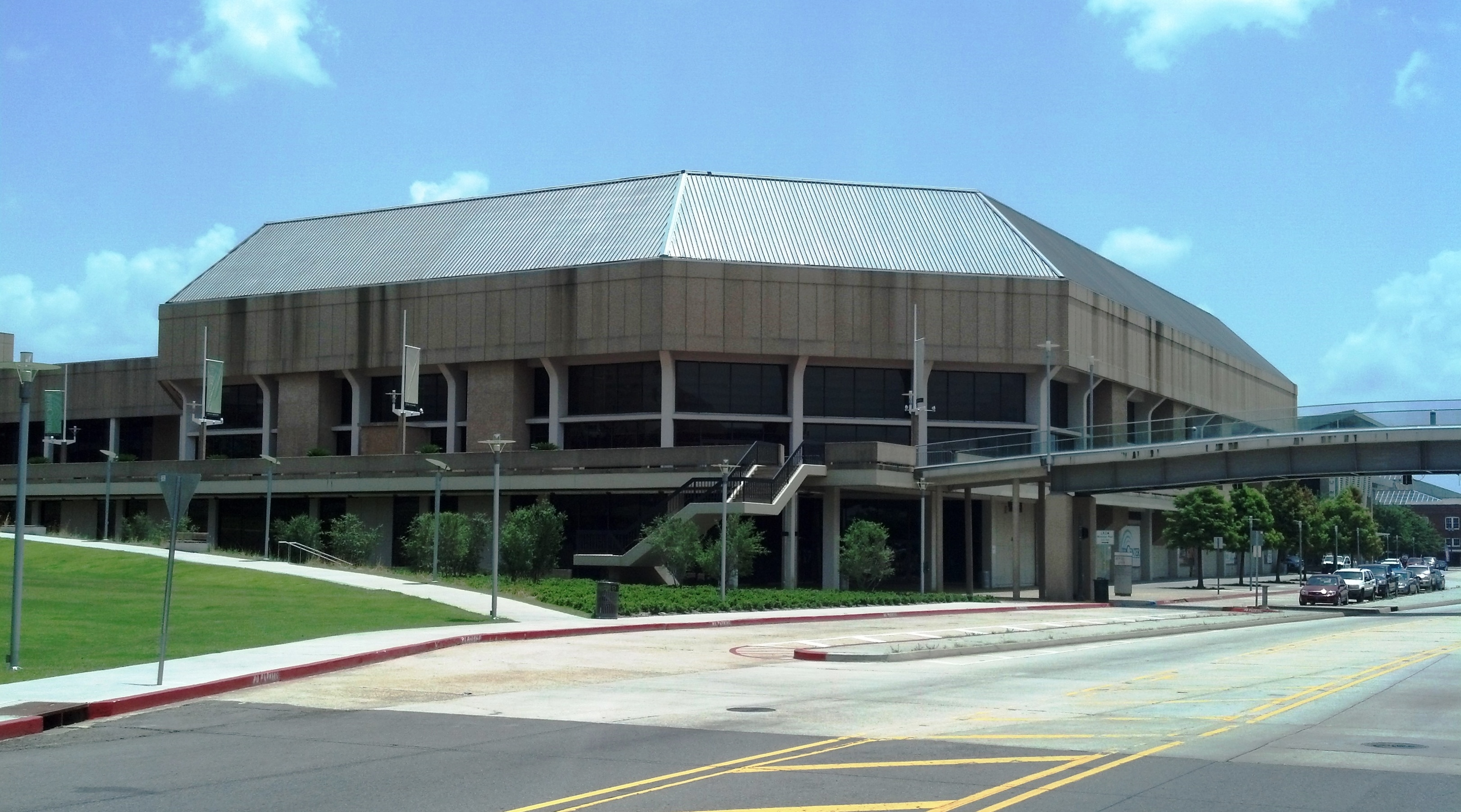
- Interactive map of Raising Cane's River Center Arena
- Former names: Riverside Centroplex Arena (1977-2004); Baton Rouge River Center Arena (2004-16)
- Address: 275 River Rd S Baton Rouge, LA 70802-5809
- Location: Raising Cane's River Center
- Owner: Baton Rouge Area Convention & Visitors Bureau
- Operator: ASM Global
- Capacity: 8,900

Construction
- Opened: January 14, 1977

Tenants
- Baton Rouge Kingfish (ECHL) (1996–2003); Baton Rouge Bombers (EISL) (1997–98); Louisiana Bayou Beast (IPFL) (1999); Baton Rouge Blaze (af2) (2001); Baton Rouge Zydeco (FPHL) (2023–26); Baton Rouge Kingfish (FPHL) (2026–present)

The Raising Cane's River Center Arena (originally the Riverside Centroplex Arena and commonly known as the River Center Arena) is a multi-purpose arena in Baton Rouge, Louisiana, in the United States. The arena can be combined with the exhibition hall to create more than 100,000 square feet (10,000 m^{2}) of contiguous convention or exhibit space. The arena which opened in 1977 presents concerts, sporting events, theater events, trade shows, and family shows, with seating for up to 10,400 for concerts (permanent and floor seats), 8,900 for sporting events (permanent seats) and 4,500 for theatre events. Besides sporting events, the arena hosts the annual Louisiana Senior Beta Club Convention.

In 2016, Raising Cane's Chicken Fingers signed a 10-year naming rights agreement for the arena.

== Teams ==
The arena has been home to multiple sports teams based in Baton Rouge. From 1996 to 2003, it was home to the Baton Rouge Kingfish hockey team of the (ECHL). Also during that time, the arena was home to the Baton Rouge Bombers indoor soccer team of the (EISL) from (1997-1998). The venue was home to two professional arena football teams, the Louisiana Bayou Beast of the (IPFL) in (1999) and the Baton Rouge Blaze of the (af2) in (2001). From 2023 to 2026, the arena hosted the Baton Rouge Zydeco of the Federal Prospects Hockey League. Beginning with the 2026-27 season, the arena is home to the Baton Rouge Kingfish of the same league.

The LSU Tigers women's gymnastics team has also hosted home gymnastics meets at the arena.

== See also ==
- Raising Cane's River Center
- List of music venues
