= Dave Whinham =

American football coach and executive (born 1957)

Profile
- Position: Head coach

Personal information
- Born: January 2, 1957 (age 69)

Career history

Coaching
- Detroit Drive (1988–1990) (Asst); Columbus/Cleveland Thunderbolts (1991–1993) (HC); Tampa Bay Storm (1995–1997) (Asst); Buffalo Destroyers (1999–2000) (HC); Tampa Bay Storm (2000) (Asst); Lafayette Roughnecks (2001) (HC)

Operations
- Columbus/Cleveland Thunderbolts (1991–1993) GM); Tampa Bay Storm (1995–1997) (DPP); Buffalo Destroyers (1998–2000) (VPO); Lafayette Roughnecks (2001) (VP); Baton Rouge Blaze (2001) (VP); Columbus Destroyers (2004) (Pres); Dallas Vigilantes (2010–2011) (Pres)

Awards and highlights
- 4× ArenaBowl champion (1988, 1990, 1995, 1996)

Head coaching record
- Regular season: 7–43 (.140)
- Postseason: 0–1 (.000)
- Career: 7–44 (.137)

Dave Whinham (born January 2, 1957) is an American former football coach who was a head coach for five seasons in the Arena Football League with the Columbus/Cleveland Thunderbolts and Buffalo Destroyers. He is a native of Detroit.

== Coaching career ==
Whinham coached college football for seven years, including two stints at his alma mater Grand Valley State University, one at Wayne State University and one at the University of Cincinnati. He began his coaching career as an assistant at Grand Valley State. He was a graduate assistant at Cincinnati in 1984.

He joined the Detroit Drive as an assistant coach in 1988, winning ArenaBowl II in 1988 and ArenaBowl IV in 1990. He was the strength coach of the Detroit Red Wings of the National Hockey League during the 1990–91 season.

Whinham was head coach of the Columbus/Cleveland Thunderbolts from 1991 to 1993, compiling a regular season record of 6–26. He was rehired by the Thunderbolts on March 12, 1992. The Thunderbolts made the playoffs in 1992, losing to the Orlando Predators in the first round by a score of 12–50. He was fired by the Thunderbolts in August 1993.

He was later an assistant coach for the Tampa Bay Storm from 1995 to 1997, winning ArenaBowl IX in 1995 and X in 1996.

Whinham served as head coach of the Buffalo Destroyers from 1999 to 2000, accumulating a record of 1–17. He was fired on May 8, 2000, after beginning the 2000 season with zero wins and four losses.

After being fired by the Destroyers, Whinham re-joined the Storm as an assistant coach.

He took over as interim head coach of the Lafayette Roughnecks of the AF2 after Buford Jordan was fired following a 3–8 start to the 2001 season.

== Administrative career ==
Whinham was the general manager of the Columbus/Cleveland Thunderbolts from 1991 to 1992. He was the director of player personnel of the Tampa Bay Storm from 1995 to 1997. He served as Vice President of Operations for the Buffalo Destroyers from 1998 to 2000. He also spent time as general manager of the Destroyers. He was vice president of the Lafayette Roughnecks of the af2 in 2001. He served as vice president of the Baton Rouge Blaze of the af2 in 2001. Whinham became president of the Columbus Destroyers in fall 2003 and left the team after the 2004 season. He was president of the Dallas Vigilantes from 2010 to 2011.

== Personal life ==
In 2002, he formed The Team Sales Company, which was later renamed The Team. The Team Sales Company managed the relocation of the Destroyers to Columbus in 2003 and was involved in the launch of the Vigilantes. The Team has also produced several pieces of original television programming, including Going Pro, Cullen's Quest and Underground Vallie. The Team later created the FreeForAll Concert Series, where all concerts are free. Whinham led the production of Hang On Sloopy: The Movie, a film project created by The Team.
