= Brad Calip =

American football player (born 1962)

Profile
- Position: Wide receiver / Defensive back

Personal information
- Born: December 12, 1962 (age 63); Hobart, Oklahoma, U.S.
- Listed height: 5 ft 10 in (1.78 m)
- Listed weight: 170 lb (77 kg)

Career information
- College: East Central
- NFL draft: 1985: undrafted

Career history
- Denver Gold (1985); Pittsburgh Gladiators / Tampa Bay Storm (1988–1991); Cincinnati Rockers (1992–1993)

Awards and highlights
- ArenaBowl champion (1991)
- Stats at ArenaFan.com
- College Football Hall of Fame

Brad Calip (born December 12, 1962) is an American former football player. He played professionally as defensive back and wide receiver with the Denver Gold of the United States Football League (USFL) and the Pittsburgh Gladiators / Tampa Bay Storm and Cincinnati Rockers of the Arena Football League (AFL). Calip played college football as a quarterback at East Central University in Ada, Oklahoma. He was inducted into the College Football Hall of Fame in 2003.
