= Lynn Bradford =

American football player

No. 33
- Position: Fullback / Linebacker

Personal information
- Listed height: 6 ft 1 in (1.85 m)
- Listed weight: 235 lb (107 kg)

Career information
- College: Prairie View A&M

Career history
- Detroit Drive (1989–1990); New York/New Jersey Knights (1991)*; Tampa Bay Storm (1991–1992)
- * Offseason or practice squad member only

Awards and highlights
- 4× ArenaBowl champion (1989, 1990, 1991, 1993); 2× First-team All-Arena (1989, 1991)

Career AFL statistics
- Rushes: 122
- Rushing yards: 530
- Rushing TDs: 13
- Tackles: 65
- Sacks: 4.5
- Stats at ArenaFan.com

Lynn Bradford is an American former professional football player who played four seasons in the Arena Football League (AFL) with the Detroit Drive and Tampa Bay Storm. He played college football at Prairie View A&M University.

== Early life ==
Bradford played college football for the Prairie View A&M Panthers of Prairie View A&M University. He rushed for just under 2,000 yards during his college career.

== Professional career ==
Bradford played in all four games for the Detroit Drive of the Arena Football League (AFL) in 1989, recording 19 carries for 96 yards and two touchdowns, two receptions for 16 yards and one touchdown, 12 solo tackles, four assisted tackles, 0.5 sacks, two fumble recoveries, and two pass breakups. He was a fullback/linebacker during his time in the AFL as the league played under ironman rules. The Drive finished the season with a 3–1 record and advanced to ArenaBowl III, where they beat the Pittsburgh Gladiators by a score of 39–26. Bradford was named first-team All-Arena for his performance during the 1989 season. He appeared in six games in 1990, totaling 32 rushes for 145 yards and four touchdowns, one catch for seven yards, six solo tackles, eight assisted tackles, one forced fumble, one pass breakup, and one blocked kick. The Drive went 6–2 and advanced to the ArenaBowl for the second consecutive season, this time beating the Dallas Texans in ArenaBowl IV by a margin of 51–27.

In February 1991, Bradford was selected by the New York/New Jersey Knights of the World League of American Football (WLAF) in the 1991 WLAF draft as a running back. On March 11, 1991, it was reported that he had been waived.

Bradford played in eight games for the Tampa Bay Storm of the AFL in 1991, accumulating 61 rushing attempts for 261 yards and seven touchdowns, four receptions for 23 yards, 32 solo tackles, six assisted tackles, two sacks, one forced fumble, one pass breakup, and one blocked kick. Tampa Bay finished the year with a 8–2 record and advanced to ArenaBowl V, where they beat Bradford's former team, the Detroit Drive by a score of 48–42. This was Bradford's third straight ArenaBowl victory. He earned first-team All-Arena recognition for the 1991 season. On June 6, 1992, he suffered a career-ending neck injury during the second game of the season, rupturing two discs in his neck due to a collision with a New Orleans Night receiver. He felt a burning sensation after the tackle and played the remainder of the game, but could not move his neck after the contest.

== Personal life ==
Bradford lived in Houston during the AFL offseasons. He graduated from the University of Texas Medical Branch with a degree in physical therapy, and worked as a licensed physical therapist during the AFL offseasons. He was the Storm's fullbacks/linebackers coach from 1993 to 1994, and won his fourth ArenaBowl in 1993. Bradford later served as an assistant football coach at several high schools in Florida.
