= Rusty Fricke =

American football player (born 1964)

No. 3
- Position: Kicker

Personal information
- Born: September 1, 1964 (age 62)
- Listed height: 6 ft 0 in (1.83 m)
- Listed weight: 195 lb (88 kg)

Career information
- College: Lycoming
- NFL draft: 1987: undrafted

Career history
- Philadelphia Eagles (1987)*; Pittsburgh Gladiators (1988–1990); Denver Dynamite (1991); Cincinnati Rockers (1993)
- * Offseason or practice squad member only

Awards and highlights
- First-team All-Arena (1991); AFL Kicker of the Year (1991); AFL 10th Anniversary Team (1996)

Career AFL statistics
- FG made: 52
- FG att: 177
- PAT made: 124
- PAT att: 178
- Tackles: 12
- Stats at ArenaFan.com

Herberton "Rusty" Fricke (born September 1, 1964) is an American former professional football placekicker who played five seasons in the Arena Football League (AFL) with the Pittsburgh Gladiators, Denver Dynamite and Cincinnati Rockers. Fricke played college football at Lycoming College.

== Early life ==
Herberton Fricke was born on September 1, 1964. He played soccer growing up. He did not play football until his junior year of high school in Willow Grove, Pennsylvania.

== College career ==
Fricke was a member of the Lycoming Warriors of Lycoming College from 1983 to 1986 and was a three-year starter. In 1984, he earned Associated Press honorable mention Little All-American and Pizza Hut/SID honorable mention All-American honors. He made eight of 12 field goals his senior year while also converting 39 extra points, garnering Pizza Hut/SID honorable mention All-American honors for the second time. Fricke set school records for longest field goal with a 56-yarder in 1984 and best career extra point percentage (95.3% on 101 of 106 kicking). He was also a two-time first-team All-Middle Atlantic Conferences selection. He was inducted into the school's athletics hall of fame in 1994.

== Professional career ==
Fricke signed with the Philadelphia Eagles on April 30, 1987, after going undrafted in the 1987 NFL draft. He was cut by the Eagles on July 20, 1987.

Fricke played in all 12 games for the Pittsburgh Gladiators of the Arena Football League (AFL) in 1988, converting seven of 37 field goals and 28 of 55 extra points while also posting four solo tackles and two assisted tackles. The Gladiators finished the year with a 6–6 record and lost in the first round of the playoffs to the Detroit Drive. Fricke appeared in all four games for Pittsburgh in 1989, scoring four of 24 field goals and five of eight extra points. The Gladiators finished the year 3–1 and lost to the Drive in ArenaBowl III. Fricke played in all eight games for the Gladiators during the 1990 season, recording six of 29 field goals and 21 of 29 extra points. Pittsburgh finished the season 3–5 and lost to the Drive in the playoffs for the third year in a row.

Fricke played in all ten games for the Denver Dynamite of the AFL in 1991, totaling 13 of 35 field goals, 40 of 49 extra points, and five solo tackles. The Dynamite finished the 1991 season with a 6–4 record and lost in the first round of the playoffs to the Tampa Bay Storm. On July 26, 1991, against the Columbus Thunderbolts, Fricke became the first kicker in AFL history to make a 60-yard field goal. He earned first-team All-Arena and AFL Kicker of the Year honors for his performance during the 1991 season.

Fricke appeared in all 12 games for the AFL's Cincinnati Rockers in 1993, converting 22 of 52 field goals and 30 of 37 extra points while also posting three solo tackles and one assisted tackle. The Rockers finished the season with a 2–10 record. In 1996, Fricke was named the kicker on the AFL's 10th Anniversary Team.
