= Darren Willis (gridiron football) =

American football player (born 1964)

No. 7, 23
- Position: Defensive back

Personal information
- Born: December 19, 1964 (age 61)
- Listed height: 5 ft 11 in (1.80 m)
- Listed weight: 180 lb (82 kg)

Career information
- College: Arizona State

Career history
- Winnipeg Blue Bombers (1987)*; BC Lions (1990); Tampa Bay Storm (1991); Ohio Glory (1992); Tampa Bay Storm (1993); Connecticut Coyotes (1996)
- * Offseason or practice squad member only

Awards and highlights
- 2× ArenaBowl champion (1991, 1993); ArenaBowl Ironman of the Game (1991)
- Stats at ArenaFan.com

Darren Willis (born December 19, 1964) is an American former professional football player who played in the Arena Football League (AFL), Canadian Football League (CFL), and World League of American Football (WLAF). He played college football at Arizona State University.

== Early life ==
Willis is an alumnus of Santa Monica High where he starred as a player on the 1982 CIF football champions and was teammates with Sam Anno and USC standout Keith Davis on the team that beat Long Beach Poly 21–8. He was also teammates in high school with fellow Santa Monica defensive back Junior Thurman who eventually along with Sam Anno transferred to USC after playing football at West LA College. Darren starred as a player on the 1982 CIF championship football team and also played defense with Dean Cain, who starred as a defensive back on the 1981–82 team that beat Long Beach Poly 21–8 before accepting a scholarship to play football at Princeton University. Willis later became a coach on the Santa Monica staff in 2001 and helped guide the Vikings to a CIF title the school's first since he was a prep at the school.

== College career ==
Willis was the starting free safety on the 1987 Rose Bowl Champions team that helped the Sun Devils reach their first appearance in the 1987 Rose Bowl. The Sun Devils were the 1986 Pac-10 Champions and beat both USC and UCLA in Los Angeles and a 16–9 win over the Bruins on October 4, 1987, would prove to be the deciding game in the conference. Jeff Van Raaphorst, who led Arizona State to its first Rose Bowl appearance, defeating Michigan 22–15, in the 1987 game. Van Raaphorst passed for 193 yards and two touchdowns in the game, out-dueling the Wolverines' Jim Harbaugh, and capturing Rose Bowl MVP honors. (The Arizona State University quarterback and 1987 Rose Bowl Most Valuable Player Jeff Van Raaphorst was eventually inducted into the Rose Bowl Hall of Fame). Willis holds a degree from Arizona State University in Kinesiology.

== Professional career ==
Willis grabbed 6 receptions for 124 yards and a touchdown in the 1991 Arena Bowl championship and was named the game's Ironman.
