= Buford Jordan =

American football player (born 1962)

No. 24, 23
- Position: Running back

Personal information
- Born: June 26, 1962 (age 64); Iota, Louisiana, U.S.
- Listed height: 6 ft 0 in (1.83 m)
- Listed weight: 223 lb (101 kg)

Career information
- High school: Iota
- College: McNeese State
- Supplemental draft: 1984: 1st round, 12th overall pick

Career history

Playing
- New Orleans/Portland Breakers (1984–1985); New Orleans Saints (1986–1992)

Coaching
- New Orleans Thunder (1999) - Head coach; Lafayette Roughnecks (2001) - Head coach
- Stats at Pro Football Reference

Paul Buford Jordan (born June 26, 1962) is an American former professional football player who was a running back for the New Orleans Saints of the National Football League (NFL). He played college football for the McNeese State Cowboys.

== Biography ==
A four-time all-Southland Conference selection, Jordan left McNeese State University in 1983 as the all-time leading rusher in Louisiana history. He joined the New Orleans Breakers of the USFL and was their leading rusher in 1984 with 1276 yards and 8 touchdowns on the ground. He also played in the USFL for the Portland Breakers.

After the USFL folded in 1985, Jordan joined coach Jim Mora's Saints and started 9 games, playing mostly as a blocker for Dalton Hilliard and Reuben Mayes and as a special teams performer. He had originally been drafted by the Green Bay Packers in the first round of the 1984 Supplemental Draft.

In a 1987 comeback against Cincinnati, he scored two touchdowns. In 1988, he had a 44-yard run against Atlanta and against Washington he recovered a Reuben Mayes fumble and turned it into a 7-yard score. In 1989, despite being hampered by injuries, he finished third in rushing and had another 2 touchdown day against Atlanta. Jordan was released prior to the beginning of the 1991 season, but returned and started in place of an injured Craig Heyward for the second half of the season.

In 1999, he was head coach of the New Orleans Thunder of the Regional Football League. He was also head coach of the Lafayette Roughnecks of the af2 in 2001 before being replaced by Dave Whinham.

In 2011, Jordan was selected for the Louisiana Sports Hall of Fame. In 2013, he was named the Southland Conference's "player of the decade" for the 1980s, leading the 1980s All-Decade Team chosen by the conference in connection with its 50th anniversary celebrations.

== Personal life ==
Jordan's son, Brandin Jordan, played college football for Southern Illinois University after playing his high school football for coach J.T. Curtis at John Curtis Christian High School.

Buford Jordan now provides home-based personal training and fitness training to individuals and sports teams.
