= Johnny Sims =

American football player (born 1967)

Profile
- Position: Offensive lineman / Defensive lineman

Personal information
- Born: October 14, 1967 (age 59)
- Listed height: 6 ft 3 in (1.91 m)
- Listed weight: 285 lb (129 kg)

Career information
- High school: East Marion (Columbia, Mississippi)
- College: Mississippi Valley State
- NFL draft: 1991: undrafted

Career history
- New Orleans Night (1991); Los Angeles Rams (1992); Albany Firebirds (1995)*
- * Offseason or practice squad member only

Awards and highlights
- Second-team All-Arena (1991); Second-team All-SWAC (1989)
- Stats at ArenaFan.com

Johnny Sims (born October 14, 1967) is an American former professional football lineman who played one season with the New Orleans Night of the Arena Football League (AFL). He played college football at Mississippi Valley State University.

== Early life and college ==
Johnny Sims was born on October 14, 1967. He played high school football at East Marion High School in Columbia, Mississippi.

Sims played college football for the Mississippi Valley State Delta Devils of Mississippi Valley State University from 1986 to 1990 as a defensive tackle. He recorded 88 tackles and 16 sacks in 1989, earning second-team All-SWAC honors. He announced that he was returning to Mississippi Valley State for his fifth season, much to the surprise of the media who thought he had NFL prospects. After four losing seasons, Sims said he wanted help Mississippi Valley State and new head coach Larry Dorsey have a winning season. Sims stated "I wouldn't miss this season for all the money in the NFL." The 1990 Mississippi Valley State Delta Devils went 6–5.

== Professional career ==
In May 1991, it was reported that Sims and fellow Mississippi Valley State alum, quarterback Willie Totten, had signed with the New Orleans Night of the Arena Football League (AFL). Sims played in eight games for the Night during the team's inaugural 1991 season, recording 13 solo tackles, three assisted tackles, three sacks, and one blocked kick. He was an offensive lineman/defensive lineman during his time in the AFL as the league played under ironman rules. Sims earned second-team All-Arena honors for his performance during the 1991 season. The Night finished the year with a 4–6 record. Sims stood 6'3" and weighed 285 pounds during his AFL career.

Sims signed with the Los Angeles Rams of the National Football League (NFL) on May 8, 1992, as a defensive tackle. He was waived/injured on July 25 and then reverted to injured reserve. He was waived by the Rams on November 17, 1992, and released the next day.

Sims later signed with the Albany Firebirds of the AFL for the 1995 season. He was waived on February 2, 1995.
