= Arena Football League 10th Anniversary Team =

The Arena Football League 10th Anniversary Team was compiled in 1996 to show the league's best players in its brief 10-year history.

= AFL Hall of Famer

Position	Player	Team(s) played for	College
Quarterback	Jay Gruden	Tampa Bay Storm (1991-1996)	Louisville
Fullback/linebacker	Alvin Rettig	Detroit Drive (1988-1993)	Rice
Wide receiver/defensive back	Barry Wagner	Orlando Predators (1992-1996)	Alabama A&M
Wide receiver/defensive back	Durwood Roquemore	Chicago Bruisers (1987-1988); Albany Firebirds (1990); Orlando Predators (1991-1996)	Texas A&I
Wide receiver/linebacker	Tate Randle	Detroit Drive (1988-1992)	Texas Tech
Wide receiver/linebacker	Dwayne Dixon	Washington Commandos (1987); Detroit Drive (1988-1991)	Florida
Offensive Specialist	George LaFrance	Detroit Drive (1988-1993); Tampa Bay Storm (1994-1996)	Baker
Offensive lineman/defensive lineman	Jon Roehlk	Washington Commandos (1987); Detroit Drive (1988-1993); Miami Hooters (1994); Iowa Barnstormers (1995)	Iowa
Offensive lineman/defensive lineman	John Corker	Detroit Drive (1988-1993); Miami Hooters (1994-1995)	Oklahoma State
Offensive lineman/defensive lineman	Sylvester Bembery	New England Steamrollers (1988); Albany Firebirds (1990-1993); Tampa Bay Storm (1994-1996)	Central Florida
Kicker	Rusty Fricke	Pittsburgh Gladiators (1988-1990); Denver Dynamite (1991); Cincinnati Rockers (1993)	Lycoming
