= Tom Gizzi =

American football player

Profile
- Positions: Offensive lineman, defensive lineman

Personal information
- Listed height: 6 ft 3 in (1.91 m)
- Listed weight: 245 lb (111 kg)

Career information
- High school: La Salle College (Wyndmoor, Pennsylvania)
- College: Pennsylvania
- NFL draft: 1989: undrafted

Career history
- Pittsburgh Gladiators/Tampa Bay Storm (1990–1991)

Awards and highlights
- ArenaBowl champion (1991); Second-team All-Arena (1991)
- Stats at ArenaFan.com

Tom Gizzi is an American former football lineman who played two seasons in the Arena Football League with the Pittsburgh Gladiators/Tampa Bay Storm. He played college football at the University of Pennsylvania and attended La Salle College High School in Wyndmoor, Pennsylvania.

== College career ==
Gizzi played for the Penn Quakers from 1985 to 1988. He was an All-Ivy League first-team selection, helping the Quakers win three Ivy League titles in 1985, 1986 and 1988. He was a team captain as a senior in 1988 and picked up honorable mention All-America and All-ECAC honors in addition to league honors.

== Professional career ==
Gizzi played for the Pittsburgh Gladiators/Tampa Bay Storm from 1990 to 1991. In 1991, Gizzi earned second-team All-Arena honors as the Storm won ArenaBowl V against the Detroit Drive on August 17, 1991.

== Coaching career ==
Gizzi was head girls' basketball coach at The Hill School in Pottstown, Pennsylvania and McDonogh School in Owings Mills, Maryland. He also served as assistant coach for the Loyola Greyhounds women's basketball team.
