= Darrell Grymes =

American football player (born 1961)

No. 80
- Position: Wide receiver

Personal information
- Born: December 4, 1961 (age 64); Washington, D.C., U.S.
- Listed height: 6 ft 2 in (1.88 m)
- Listed weight: 182 lb (83 kg)

Career information
- High school: Spingarn
- College: Central State (OH)
- NFL draft: 1986: undrafted

Career history
- New England Patriots (1986)*; Detroit Lions (1987); Detroit Drive (1990); Columbus Thunderbolts (1991); Orlando Predators (1991)
- * Offseason or practice squad member only

Awards and highlights
- ArenaBowl champion (1990)

Career NFL statistics
- Receptions: 9
- Receiving yards: 140
- Touchdowns: 2
- Stats at Pro Football Reference

Darrell Anthony Grymes (born December 4, 1961) is an American former professional football player who was a wide receiver for the Detroit Lions of the National Football League (NFL). He played college football for the Central State Marauders.
