= Baton Rouge Zydeco =

Professional hockey team located in Baton Rouge, Louisiana

- City: Baton Rouge, Louisiana
- League: Federal Prospects Hockey League
- Division: Continental
- Founded: 2023
- Operated: 2023–2026
- Home arena: Raising Cane's River Center Arena
- Colors: Blue, red, light blue
- Owner: Chris Bryniarski
- President: Don Lewis
- General manager: Charley Watson
- Media: WBRZ

The Baton Rouge Zydeco were a professional ice hockey team located in Baton Rouge, Louisiana, playing at the Raising Cane's River Center Arena. They were a member of the Federal Prospects Hockey League. Their inaugural season was the 2023–24 season.

== History ==
In 2022, nearly 20 years after the Baton Rouge Kingfish folded and hockey left the city of Baton Rouge, Mayor Sharon Weston Broome announced a push to bring professional ice hockey back to Baton Rouge.

In late 2022 and early 2023, the Federal Prospects Hockey League's (FPHL) Mississippi Sea Wolves hosted three exhibition games in the Raising Cane's River Center Arena with the Carolina Thunderbirds and the Port Huron Prowlers, drawing a little over 7,000 fans for each game. In April 2023, the Federal Prospects Hockey League announced a three-year lease with the Raising Cane's River Center and the city of Baton Rouge to secure the spot for an ice hockey team.

On July 13, 2023, the team name was announced as the Baton Rouge Zydeco, with the team saying "honoring the rich history and traditions that have shaped Louisiana's community. We believe in creating a sports team that not only excels on the ice but also reflects the unique culture and spirit of Baton Rouge." The name is based on the Zydeco music genre developed in Louisiana. On August 10, 2023, the Zydeco announced Matt Hamilton as the team's first head coach. The Zydeco announced a coaching change on October 12, 2023. FPHL Veteran Coach Paul Maclean and Matthew Fornari as Co-Coaches. On November 28, 2023, after a 2-10 start, the team relieved Maclean of his duties, and named Forward MJ Graham, Interim Head Coach while retaining his duties as a player. Graham would be replaced by Everett Thompson on February 19, Graham retained his playing role, as Thompson joined the club ahead of their return home after a two-month, 19 game road-trip. In January 2025, ahead of a future expansion of the FPHL into Topeka, Kansas, the Zydeco played a neutral site games against the Danville Dashers while branded as the "Topeka Road Runners", in honor of the former NAHL team of the same name.

On June 3, 2025, it was announced that Sylvain Cloutier was hired as the team's next Head Coach, replacing Thompson, also confirming Chris Bryniarski taking over as team owner as well.

The Baton Rouge Zydeco hockey team disbanded in April 2026 due to issues with ownership and communication, leading to the cancellation of their operations.

== See also ==
- Baton Rouge Kingfish (FPHL)
- Baton Rouge Kingfish
