= Scott Humeniuk =

Canadian ice hockey player

- Born: September 10, 1969 (age 55); Saskatoon, Saskatchewan, Canada
- Height: 6 ft 0 in (183 cm)
- Weight: 190 lb (86 kg; 13 st 8 lb)
- Position: Defence
- Shot: Right
- Played for: Binghamton Whalers; Springfield Indians; Minnesota Moose; Portland Pirates; Rochester Americans; Providence Bruins; Lukko; Augsburger Panther
- Playing career: 1989–1999

Scott "Hummer" Humeniuk is a Canadian retired professional ice hockey player, most notably with the Springfield Indians of the American Hockey League.

== History ==
=== Junior career ===
Humeniuk started his major junior career in 1987 with the Spokane Chiefs of the Western Hockey League, but saw limited action until the next season. Despite a separated shoulder and a short suspension for a spearing incident, he was a top-four defenseman.

The following year Humeniuk was traded to the Moose Jaw Warriors after Chiefs' coach Butch Goring expressed dissatisfaction concerning his training camp performance.

=== Professional career ===
Undrafted by any NHL team, Humeniuk signed a minor league contract with the Hartford Whalers. His first professional action was a short stint with their Binghamton Whalers farm team in the American Hockey League in the 1990 season. The following year, with the Whalers' new affiliation being with the Springfield Indians, he played most of the season with the Indians, participating in the team's seventh and final Calder Cup championship. Humeniuk played parts of four seasons in all with Springfield, his best year coming in 1994 when, paired with veteran defenseman and First Team All-Star Rob Cowie, he scored 15 goals and 42 points to rank fourth on the team in scoring.

An unrestricted free agent thereafter, Humeniuk played for four AHL teams in the next two years before playing two seasons in Europe, with Lukko of the SM-liiga in 1997 and the Augsburger Panther of the Deutsche Eishockey Liga in 1998. He returned to North America to play for the Baton Rouge Kingfish of the East Coast Hockey League in 1999 and led the team in defense scoring that season, but suffered a serious stroke later in the year, which forced his retirement.

Humeniuk continued to make his home in Baton Rouge thereafter, and his #55 jersey was retired by the team in 2002.

== Career statistics ==
			Regular season					Playoffs
Season	Team	League	GP	G	A	Pts	PIM	GP	G	A	Pts	PIM
1986–87	Spokane Chiefs	WHL	10	2	0	2	2	1	0	0	0	0
1987–88	Spokane Chiefs	WHL	58	6	20	26	154	8	1	0	1	19
1988–89	Moose Jaw Warriors	WHL	56	18	39	57	159	7	5	0	5	32
1989–90	Moose Jaw Warriors	WHL	71	23	47	70	141	—	—	—	—	—
1989–90	Binghamton Whalers	AHL	4	0	1	1	11	—	—	—	—	—
1990–91	Springfield Indians	AHL	57	6	17	23	69	14	2	2	4	18
1991–92	Springfield Indians	AHL	28	2	3	5	27	—	—	—	—	—
1991–92	Louisville Icehawks	ECHL	26	7	21	28	93	13	1	11	12	33
1992–93	Springfield Indians	AHL	16	0	3	3	28	14	1	3	4	8
1992–93	Louisville Icehawks	ECHL	36	14	31	45	117	—	—	—	—	—
1993–94	Springfield Indians	AHL	71	15	42	57	91	6	0	3	3	8
1994–95	Minnesota Moose	IHL	47	10	15	25	55	—	—	—	—	—
1994–95	Portland Pirates	AHL	8	3	1	4	30	7	3	3	6	2
1995–96	Portland Pirates	AHL	29	4	10	14	50	—	—	—	—	—
1995–96	Rochester Americans	AHL	12	0	2	2	19	—	—	—	—	—
1995–96	Providence Bruins	AHL	18	3	7	10	15	4	2	1	3	4
1996–97	Lukko	Liiga	42	6	11	17	108	—	—	—	—	—
1997–98	Augsburger Panther	DEL	36	9	11	20	88	6	1	1	2	16
1998–99	Baton Rouge Kingfish	ECHL	53	9	27	36	88	—	—	—	—	—
AHL totals			243	33	86	119	340	45	8	12	20	30

== Awards ==
- WHL East Second All-Star Team – 1990
