= Sam Anno =

American football player and coach

San Diego Strike Force
- Title: Defensive assistant

Personal information
- Born: January 26, 1965 (age 61); Santa Monica, California, U.S.
- Listed height: 6 ft 2 in (1.88 m)
- Listed weight: 236 lb (107 kg)

Career information
- High school: Santa Monica (Santa Monica, California)
- College: USC
- NFL draft: 1987: undrafted

Career history

Playing
- Los Angeles Rams (1987); Minnesota Vikings (1987–1988); Tampa Bay Buccaneers (1989–1991); San Diego Chargers (1992–1993)

Coaching
- Saint Monica Catholic High School (1996–1999) (assistant coach); Santa Monica High School (2000–2001) (defensive coordinator); Venice High School (2004) (assistant coach); USC (2005–2007) (graduate assistant coach); Central Connecticut State (2008) (linebackers/special teams); University of San Diego (2009–2014) (linebackers coach/special teams coord.); University of San Diego (2010–2014) (special teams coordinator/def. line coach); Oakland Raiders (2015–2017) (defensive assistant); San Diego Strike Force (2019–present) (defensive assistant)

Awards and highlights
- 1989 NFL Special Teams Player of the Year

Career NFL statistics
- Fumble recoveries: 1
- Stats at Pro Football Reference

Sam Scott Anno (born January 26, 1965) is an American former professional football linebacker, and currently a defensive assistant coach for the San Diego Strike Force of the Indoor Football League (IFL).

== Early life ==
Anno prepped at Saint Monica Catholic High School and then at Santa Monica High School in Southern California where he was recruited to play college football at USC. During his tenure at Santa Monica High, actors Charlie Sheen and Dean Cain, also alumni of Santa Monica High School, were teammates and good friends of Sam Anno.

He was also teammates in high school with fellow Santa Monica High standout USC linebacker Keith Davis and Arizona State standout safety Darren Willis and free safety Junior Thurman who eventually (along with Anno) transferred to USC after playing football at West Los Angeles College. He starred as a player on the 1982 California Interscholastic Federation championship football team.

== College career ==
Anno played linebacker during college in 1987 alongside Jack Del Rio; the two would be reunited years later in the NFL where Anno and Del Rio played for the Minnesota Vikings. Anno played for Ted Tollner, who ironically, was dismissed in 1986 from Southern Cal despite a winning record. Anno holds the All-time tackle record at USC for a single game with 23 tackles against Illinois in 1986. He also obtained his master's degree from USC in Athletic Administration.

== Professional career ==
Anno played in the NFL between 1987 and 1994 as a linebacker, long snapper and special teams player for the Los Angeles Rams, the Minnesota Vikings, the Tampa Bay Buccaneers and the San Diego Chargers. He spent three seasons as the Bucs' long snapper and special teams' captain. Anno was a very popular member of the Bucs with the fans. He went on to fulfill the same roles with San Diego after leaving the Bucs. He was the leading special teams tackler on all of his previous teams. Anno was voted team captain for three years during his career. The special teams tackle records he set still stand today with the Tampa Bay Buccaneers. In 1989, players from the NFL voted him NFL Special Teams Player of the Year while he was at Tampa Bay.

Anno was on the 1991 Tampa Bay Buccaneers squad the year that former Santa Monica High School Vikings quarterback Pat O'Hara (1984) was drafted by the Bucs (10, 260). I was just in junior high school then and even though I didn't know him personally, I knew of him", said at O'Hara who grew up a mile from Sam Anno "Everyone knew who he was. Sam was a legend."

"It was really weird when I found out that they had drafted Pat", said Anno, who was about to enter his third season with the Buccaneers. "I said, `No way . . . I can't believe that Pat is coming here.' "

Anno and O'Hara renewed their friendship at Tampa Bay. O'Hara spent most of the season on the team's development squad and Anno led the Buccaneers in tackles on special teams.

== Coaching career ==
Prior to coaching at University of San Diego, Anno coached at Central Connecticut, USC, Santa Monica High School, Venice High School and St. Monica High School between 1996 and 2007. Anno played a key role in comforting the USC football team and staff when he broke the news to the team of the death USC placekicker (whom Anno coached) Mario Danelo in 2007. His body was found at the bottom of a rocky cliff, and police investigated his death as an accident or possible suicide. The notion that Danelo could take his own life was so unbelievable to Anno that he went to the site near the Point Fermin Lighthouse from where Danelo apparently fell. Anno saw the slippery ice plants, the jutting rocks and the loose ground on the other side of the 4-foot concrete barrier where plenty of people went, despite the "Danger: Do Not Enter" signs. Anno told the story of the former Trojan walk-on's beginnings as a kicker during his San Pedro High School career as an All-City linebacker. Danelo had asked his father, former NFL kicker Joe Danelo, whose father kicked for the New York Giants and the Buffalo Bills to teach him.

"His father told Mario, 'I'll help you kick if you're up and have a bag of balls,'" Anno said. "And every morning at 3 a.m., Mario would be at the door with a bag of balls, and they'd go kick at the high school in the dark until 5 a.m."

In February 2015, Anno and Del Rio were reunited again when Del Rio, having been recently hired as head coach of the Raiders, hired Anno as a defensive assistant.
