= Bryan Brock =

American football quarterback

No. 10
- Position: Quarterback

Personal information
- Listed height: 6 ft 0 in (1.83 m)
- Listed weight: 210 lb (95 kg)

Career information
- College: Texas Tech (1983–1984)

Career history
- Dallas Texans (1990); Columbus Thunderbolts (1991); Orlando Predators (1992–1993)

Career AFL statistics
- Comp. / Att.: 26 / 54
- Passing yards: 250
- TD–INT: 3–1
- QB rating: 67.67
- Stats at ArenaFan.com

Bryan Brock is an American former professional football quarterback who played four seasons in the Arena Football League (AFL) with the Dallas Texans, Columbus Thunderbolts and Orlando Predators. He played college football at Texas Tech University.

== College career ==
Brock played college football for the Texas Tech Red Raiders of Texas Tech University. He played in 11 games in 1983, totaling four incomplete passes, one interception, and two carries for one yard. He appeared in eight games in 1984, rushing once for negative five yards.

== Professional career ==
Brock played in six games for the Dallas Texans of the Arena Football League (AFL) in 1990, completing two of five passes for 16 yards while also rushing once for seven yards.

He appeared in one game for the Columbus Thunderbolts of the AFL in 1991, recording nine completions on 21 passing attempts (42.9%) for 93 yards and one interception, six rushing attempts for seven yards, and one solo tackle.

In June 1991, Brock was traded to the Orlando Predators for future considerations. He was immediately placed on injured reserve by the Predators and did not play in any games for them that season. He played in all ten games for the Predators in 1992, completing 15 of 28 passes (53.6%) for 141 yards and three touchdowns while also rushing six times for seven yards. He also posted one solo tackle and one assisted tackle that year. The Predators finished the 1992 season with a 9–1 record and then won two playoff games before losing to the Detroit Drive in ArenaBowl VI. Brock appeared in one game for the Predators in 1993 but did not record any statistics.
