= Northern Division (AFL) =

The Northern Division of the Arena Football League was formed for the 1992 season and was disbanded after the end of the season. It consisted of the Albany Firebirds, Cincinnati Rockers, Cleveland Thunderbolts, and Detroit Drive. The Drive won the division in its only year of existence. The Firebirds were a 1990 expansion team, the Rockers were a 1992 expansion team, The ThunderBolts relocated from Columbus, Ohio following the 1991 season (their first in the league), and the Drive were a 1988 expansion team. A spiritual successor of the Northern Division was the Central Division.
