= Mickey Russell =

American football quarterback

Profile
- Position: Quarterback

Personal information
- Listed height: 6 ft 1 in (1.85 m)
- Listed weight: 195 lb (88 kg)

Career information
- High school: Abilene (Abilene, Texas)
- College: Angelo State (1985–1989)
- NFL draft: 1990: undrafted

Career history
- Dallas Texans (1991)

Awards and highlights
- 2× First-team All-LSC (1988–1989); Second-team All-LSC (1987)

Career AFL statistics
- Comp. / Att.: 40 / 80
- Passing yards: 473
- TD–INT: 7–5
- QB rating: 64.22
- Stats at ArenaFan.com

Mickey Russell is an American former professional football quarterback who played one season with the Dallas Texans of the Arena Football League (AFL). He played college football at Angelo State University.

== Early life and college ==
Russell attended Abilene High School in Abilene, Texas. He graduated in 1985.

Russell played college football for the Angelo State Rams of Angelo State University. He redshirted the 1985 season and was a four-year letterman from 1986 to 1989. He became the team's starter as a redshirt sophomore in 1987 and earned second-team All-Lone Star Conference (LSC) honors. Russell played in eight games during the 1988 season, completing 97 of 187 passes for 1,524 yards, 13 touchdowns, and nine interceptions while garnering first-team All-LSC recognition. He also finished tenth in NCAA Division II in passing efficiency that year. He earned unanimous first-team All-LSC honors his senior year in 1989 after passing for 2,661 yards and 17 touchdowns while leading Angelo State to the Division II semifinals.

== Professional career ==
Russell went undrafted in the 1990 NFL draft. He was working at Sears selling air conditioners and lawn mowers when the Dallas Texans of the Arena Football League (AFL) called to sign him in 1991. He spent the majority of the 1991 season as the backup to Alfred Jenkins but also started the final two games of the season, leading the team to a 1–1 record. During his second start, he was tackled for a safety late in the game, stretchered off the field, and taken to the hospital. The injury was later revealed to be a pinched nerve. Overall, Russell played in all ten games, starting two, in 1991, completing 40 of 80 passes (50.0%) for 473 yards, seven touchdowns, and five interceptions. He earned $400 per game as a rookie in the AFL, plus $100 victory bonuses and free apartment rent. In November 1991, it was reported that Russell had passed a tryout in San Antonio to qualify him for the World League of American Football draft in January 1992. The tryout started with 20 quarterbacks but only three, including Russell, qualified for the draft. However, Russell did not end up getting drafted.
