= Joe March =

American football player (born 1967)

Profile
- Position: Offensive lineman / defensive lineman

Personal information
- Born: June 18, 1967 (age 59)
- Listed height: 6 ft 3 in (1.91 m)
- Listed weight: 270 lb (122 kg)

Career information
- College: Murray State

Career history
- Denver Dynamite (1991); Sacramento Attack (1992); Miami Hooters (1993); Tampa Bay Storm (1993–1996); Nashville Kats (1997)

Awards and highlights
- 3× ArenaBowl champion (1993, 1995, 1996); First-team All-Arena (1991); Arena Football Hall of Fame inductee (2000)

Career AFL statistics
- Receptions-Yards: 16-134
- Receiving TDs: 7
- Tackles: 53
- Sacks: 26
- Interceptions: 1
- Stats at ArenaFan.com

Joseph March (born June 18, 1967) is an American former professional football offensive lineman and defensive lineman in the Arena Football League (AFL) for the Denver Dynamite, Sacramento Attack, Miami Hooters, Tampa Bay Storm and the Nashville Kats. He played college football at Murray State University. In 2000, March was inducted into the Arena Football Hall of Fame.

== College career ==
March attended Murray State University where he was a member of the football team. March had a productive 1987 season for the Racers, registering 14.0 tackles for loss, including a 3.0 sack game against Middle Tennessee State.

== Professional career ==
=== Denver Dynamite ===
March signed with the Denver Dynamite of the Arena Football League in 1991. As a rookie, March had 12.5 sacks, on his way to being named a First Team All-Arena Selection.

=== Sacramento Attack ===
March played with the Sacramento Attack in 1992.

=== Miami Hooters ===
In 1993, the Attack relocated to Miami, Florida and became the Miami Hooters. On June 14, 1993, March was traded to the Tampa Bay Storm for Willie Cannon and Reggie Berry.

=== Tampa Bay Storm ===
March helped lead the Storm to an ArenaBowl Championship in 1993 follow his trade from Miami. While in Tampa Bay, March helped the Storm win three titles in four years (1993, 1995, 1996).

=== Nashville Kats ===
March finished his career following playing the 1997 season with the Nashville Kats.
