= Tate Randle =

American football player (born 1959)

No. 21, 29, 35
- Position: Cornerback

Personal information
- Born: August 15, 1959 (age 67); Fredericksburg, Texas, U.S.
- Listed height: 6 ft 0 in (1.83 m)
- Listed weight: 202 lb (92 kg)

Career information
- High school: Fort Stockton (Fort Stockton, Texas)
- College: Texas Tech
- NFL draft: 1982: 8th round, 220th overall pick

Career history
- Miami Dolphins (1982)*; Houston Oilers (1982–1983); Baltimore / Indianapolis Colts (1983–1986); Miami Dolphins (1987); Detroit Drive (1988,1990–1992)
- * Offseason or practice squad member only

Awards and highlights
- 3× ArenaBowl champion (1989, 1990, 1992); First-team All-Arena (1991); Second-team All-Arena (1990); AFL's 10th Anniversary Team (1996); AFL Hall of Fame

Career NFL statistics
- Interceptions: 7
- INT yards: 123
- Fumble recoveries: 4
- Stats at Pro Football Reference
- Stats at ArenaFan.com

Tate Randle (born August 15, 1959) is an American former professional football player who was a cornerback in the National Football League (NFL) and the Arena Football League (AFL). He played college football for the Texas Tech Red Raiders. Randle was selected 220th overall by the Miami Dolphins in the eighth round of the 1982 NFL draft.

Randle also played for the Houston Oilers, Baltimore / Indianapolis Colts, and Detroit Drive.
