= Baton Rouge Kingfish =

- City: Baton Rouge, LA
- League: ECHL
- Founded: 1988
- Operated: 1996–2003
- Home arena: Riverside Centroplex
- Head coach: Luke St. Pe

Franchise history
- 1988–1995: Erie Panthers
- 1996–2003: Baton Rouge Kingfish
- 2004–2011: Victoria Salmon Kings

The Baton Rouge Kingfish were a minor professional ice hockey team in Baton Rouge, Louisiana, as a member of the East Coast Hockey League. The franchise arrived in Baton Rouge in 1996 after relocating from Erie, Pennsylvania, where they had played as the Erie Panthers since 1988 as one of the ECHL's charter teams. After a team-naming contest, they were renamed the Kingfish in honor of legendary Louisiana governor and U.S. Senator Huey P. Long who shared the nickname. They played as the Baton Rouge Kingfish from 1996 to 2003 before moving to Victoria, British Columbia, as the Victoria Salmon Kings.

They played their home games at the Riverside Centroplex (since renamed Raising Cane's River Center) and maintained a parent club affiliation with the St. Louis Blues of the National Hockey League. Former coaches included Pierre McGuire, currently a commentator for NHL on NBC, Dave Schultz, the NHL's all-time record holder for penalty minutes in a single season (472), and Cam Brown, who served as a player-coach. Brown was also one of the most known players on the team. He played every single season for the Kingfish and was either the captain or the player coach in every season but the first. Cam Brown currently holds the ECHL career records for both games played and penalty minutes. He retired from play in the league after the 2005-06 season as a member of the Gwinnett Gladiators. His #44 was one of two to be retired by the Kingfish along with #55 of defenseman Scott Humeniuk who suffered a stroke while a member of the team.

== Louisiana Hockey Rivalries ==
Although league divisions were restructured several times, the Kingfish played most often in the Southwest Division, which usually included the (Biloxi) Mississippi Sea Wolves, Mobile Mysticks, Birmingham Bulls, Pensacola Ice Pilots, New Orleans Brass, Jackson Bandits, (Little Rock) Arkansas RiverBlades, and the (Lafayette) Louisiana IceGators who were one of the most successful franchises in the history of the ECHL, both in wins and ticket sales. The proximity of the IceGators, (about 50 miles west of Baton Rouge) contributed to them immediately becoming a fierce rival of both the Kingfish players and fans, a rivalry dubbed by bumper stickers as "the cold war". The rivalry was exacerbated by the departure of early Kingfish players like Blair Manning and Don Parsons (who was incidentally the original captain for the Kingfish) who went on to have successful careers with the IceGators.

Beginning with the Kingfish inaugural season in 1996–1997, the Kingfish and IceGators challenged each other annually for the Atchafalaya Governor's Cup, which was named for the river that divided the two cities and was awarded to the team with the best head-to-head record. The Kingfish won the cup in their first season despite finishing behind the IceGators in the division. The name of the cup was later changed to the Hibernia Cup when New Orleans subsequently joined the league, effectively making it a 3-way challenge for state bragging rights. New Orleans' arrival in the league did very little if anything to alter the chemistry between the existing rivals though they remained competitive in the division. Despite some modest success in head-to-head games against the IceGators, the Kingfish franchise ultimately spent most of its existence in their shadow, and were never able to match the on-ice success or popularity of the Lafayette club. The best finish for the Kingfish was in 1998–1999 as they went 3-3 in the Kelly Cup Playoffs, reaching the conference quarterfinals.

== Season results ==
		Regular season					Playoffs
Season	Team	GP	Pts	W	L	OTL/SOL	GP	W	L	Result
1996–1997	Baton Rouge Kingfish	70	68	31	33	6	-	-	-	out of playoffs
1997–1998	Baton Rouge Kingfish	70	76	33	27	10	-	-	-	out of playoffs
1998–1999	Baton Rouge Kingfish	70	70	30	30	10	6	3	3	lost in round 2
1999–2000	Baton Rouge Kingfish	70	71	33	32	5	2	0	2	lost in round 1
2000–2001	Baton Rouge Kingfish	72	81	35	26	11	2	0	2	lost in round 1
2001–2002	Baton Rouge Kingfish	72	66	29	35	8	-	-	-	Out of playoffs
2002–2003	Baton Rouge Kingfish	72	49	20	43	9	-	-	-	Out of playoffs
2003–2004	Franchise dormant

== Kingfish in the NHL ==
Former Kingfish that went on to play in the NHL include forwards Alex Burrows, Raitis Ivanāns and Reed Low, defensemen Shane Hnidy and David Van Drunen, and goaltenders Johan Hedberg, and Travis Scott.

Kingfish players that had previously played in the NHL include forward Cam Brown and goaltenders Mike Lenarduzzi, Christian Soucy, Jordan Willis. Pierre McGuire, who had previously coached the NHL's Hartford Whalers in 1993–94, joined the Kingfish in their inaugural season of 1996–97 as their head coach. Anders Sörensen, current assistant coach of the NHL's Chicago Blackhawks played for the Kingfish in the 1999–2000 season.

== Legacy ==
In 2026, a new Federal Prospects Hockey League franchise in Baton Rouge adopted the Kingfish name, citing the earlier club as one of its inspirations. The new Kingfish are scheduled to begin play in the 2026–27 season at the same arena, now known as the Raising Cane's River Center Arena.
