= Jon Roehlk =

American football player (1961–2016)

No. 62, 64, 51
- Positions: Offensive lineman, defensive lineman

Personal information
- Born: June 25, 1961; Davenport, Iowa, U.S.
- Died: March 13, 2016 (aged 54); Davenport, Iowa, U.S.
- Listed height: 6 ft 2 in (1.88 m)
- Listed weight: 257 lb (117 kg)

Career information
- High school: Durant (Durant, Iowa)
- College: Iowa
- NFL draft: 1984: undrafted

Career history
- Detroit Lions (1984)*; Washington Commandos (1987); Chicago Bears (1987); Detroit Drive (1990–1993); Miami Hooters (1994); Iowa Barnstormers (1995)
- * Offseason or practice squad member only

Awards and highlights
- 4× ArenaBowl champion (1988, 1989, 1990, 1992); First-team All-Arena (1987); Second-team All-Arena (1988); AFL 10th Anniversary Team (1996); All-ArenaBowl Team (1999); Arena Football Hall of Fame (1999)

Career AFL statistics
- Tackles: 44
- Sacks: 14
- Pass Breakups: 4
- Fumble recoveries: 2
- Stats at ArenaFan.com
- Stats at Pro Football Reference

Jon Michael Roehlk (June 25, 1961 – March 13, 2016) was an American professional football offensive/defensive lineman who played in the Arena Football League (AFL). He played college football at the University of Iowa, where he was a team captain in 1983.

In 1999, Roehlk was elected into the Arena Football Hall of Fame. He died in 2016 after a period of declining health.
