= Baton Rouge Blaze =

Arena football team

Logo

General information
- Founded: 2000
- Folded: 2001
- Headquartered: Baton Rouge River Center Arena in Baton Rouge, Louisiana
- Colors: Navy, yellow, red, white

Personnel
- Head coach: Alan Risher

Team history
- Baton Rouge Blaze (2001)

Home fields
- Baton Rouge River Center Arena (2001)

League / conference affiliations
- af2 (2001): National Conference (2001); South Central Division (2001)

The Baton Rouge Blaze was an expansion team that joined the af2 in 2001. The Advocate held a "Name the Team" contest which was won by a local teacher, Sean Fluharty. The head coach was former LSU quarterback Alan Risher. The cheer/dance team was known as the Starz and was led by former Miss Fitness Universe and Miss Bikini Universe Katie Uter. The Blaze was joined by the Bossier-Shreveport Battle Wings, Columbus Wardogs, Florida Firecats, Iowa Barnstormers (not to be confused with the Iowa Barnstormers that became the New York Dragons of the AFL), Lafayette Roughnecks, Lincoln Lightning, Louisville Fire, Macon Knights, Memphis Xplorers, Peoria Pirates, Rochester Brigade, and Wichita Stealth. In 2001, the Blaze went 10-6 but did not make the playoffs. Due to the owner's financial difficulties, the team was dissolved prior to the 2002 season.

== Season-by-season ==
Season records
Season	W	L	T	Finish	Playoff results
2001	10	6	0	3rd NC South Central	--
