= Fred Gayles =

American football player (born 1966)

No. 84
- Position: Wide receiver / Linebacker

Personal information
- Born: May 11, 1966 (age 60); Denver, Colorado, U.S.
- Listed height: 6 ft 0 in (1.83 m)
- Listed weight: 205 lb (93 kg)

Career information
- College: Western State Colorado
- NFL draft: 1988: undrafted

Career history
- Denver Dynamite (1989); Albany Firebirds (1990–1996); New York CityHawks (1997); Grand Rapids Rampage (1998)

Awards and highlights
- NAIA Second Team All-American (1987); 2× Second Team All-Arena (1991, 1995)

Career AFL statistics
- Receptions: 402
- Receiving yards: 5,279
- Receiving TDs: 74
- Kickoff return yards: 3,163
- Kickoff return TDs: 3
- Stats at ArenaFan.com

Frederick Gayles (born May 11, 1966) is a former Arena football wide receiver/linebacker in the Arena Football League (AFL). He played college football at Western State Colorado University.

In 2002, Gayles was elected into the Arena Football Hall of Fame.
