= Tom Porras =

American gridiron football player (born 1958)

Profile
- Position: Quarterback

Personal information
- Born: March 28, 1958 (age 68); Oxnard, California, U.S.

Career information
- College: Washington; Ventura (CA) JC

Career history
- 1983: Chicago Blitz (USFL)
- 1984: Arizona Wranglers (USFL)
- 1985: Portland Breakers (USFL)
- 1985–1988: Hamilton Tiger-Cats
- 1989–1990: Calgary Stampeders
- 1990–1991: Toronto Argonauts
- 1992: Albany Firebirds (AFL)
- 1993–1994: Winnipeg Blue Bombers
- 1994: Las Vegas Sting
- 1996: Charlotte Rage

Awards and highlights
- 2× Grey Cup champion (1986, 1991); First Team All-Arena (1991)

Tom Porras (born March 28, 1958) is an American former gridiron football player. He played as a quarterback in the Canadian Football League (CFL) from 1985 to 1994 for four teams. Previously, he played in the United States Football League (USFL) in their three seasons of existence. Later he played in the Arena Football League (AFL).

Porras played college football at the University of Washington in Seattle under head coach Don James, transferring in 1978 from Ventura College in southern California.

From 2003 to 2007, Porras was a substitute teacher and assistant football and track coach at Saguaro High School in Scottsdale, Arizona. On April 26, 2007, he was arrested and placed on administrative leave due to suspicion of sex abuse and public sexual indecency with a female student. The case was dismissed on February 27, 2008 after his confession was thrown out due to a Miranda rights violation.
