= Milton Barney =

American football player (born 1963)

No. 84
- Position: Wide receiver

Personal information
- Born: December 23, 1963 (age 62)
- Listed height: 5 ft 9 in (1.75 m)
- Listed weight: 156 lb (71 kg)

Career information
- High school: Gulfport (Gulfport, Mississippi)
- College: Alcorn State (1983–1986)
- NFL draft: 1987: undrafted

Career history
- Atlanta Falcons (1987); Tampa Bay Buccaneers (1988–1989)*; New Orleans Night (1991)
- * Offseason or practice squad member only

Awards and highlights
- Black college national champion (1984); First-team All-Arena (1991); AFL Ironman of the Year (1991); First-team All-SWAC (1986); Second-team All-SWAC (1985)

Career NFL statistics
- Receptions: 10
- Receiving yards: 175
- Receiving touchdowns: 2
- Stats at Pro Football Reference

Career AFL statistics
- Receptions: 37
- Receiving yards: 550
- Tackles: 42
- Interceptions: 2
- Total touchdowns: 10
- Stats at ArenaFan.com

Milton J. Barney (born December 23, 1963) is an American former professional football player who was a wide receiver for one season with the Atlanta Falcons of the National Football League (NFL). He played college football for the Alcorn State Braves. He also played for the New Orleans Night of the Arena Football League (AFL).

== Early life ==
Milton J. Barney was born on December 23, 1963. He attended Gulfport High School in Gulfport, Mississippi.

== College career ==
Barney was a four-year letterman for the Alcorn State Braves of Alcorn State University from 1983 to 1986. He did not appear in any games in 1983. He caught 33 passes for 622 yards and seven touchdowns in 1984, earning Southwestern Athletic Conference (SWAC) Newcomer of the Year honors. The 1984 Braves were named black college national champions. Barney recorded 46 receptions for 686 yards and five touchdowns in 1985, garnering second-team All-SWAC recognition. As a senior in 1986, he caught 48 passes for 719 yards and five touchdowns earning first-team All-SWAC accolades.

== Professional career ==
After going undrafted in the 1987 NFL draft, Barney signed with the Atlanta Falcons on May 6. He was released on September 7. On September 23, Barney re-signed with the Falcons during the 1987 NFL players strike. He started all three strike games for the Falcons, catching ten passes for 175 yards and two touchdowns while also returning five punts for 28 yards. He was released on October 19 after the strike ended.

Barney was signed by the Tampa Bay Buccaneers on July 7, 1988. He was released on August 1, 1988, after leaving the team. He did not give a reason for leaving but had been sidelined due to an ankle injury. He signed with the Buccaneers again on February 16, 1989, but was released later that year.

Barney played in nine games for the New Orleans Night of the Arena Football League (AFL) in 1991, totaling 37 receptions for 550 yards and eight touchdowns, 11 carries for 36 yards and two touchdowns, 31 kick returns for 506 yards, 37 solo tackles, 10 assisted tackles, two interceptions, 14 pass breakups, two forced fumbles, and one fumble recovery. He was a wide receiver/defensive back during his time in the AFL as the league played under ironman rules. He earned AFL Ironman of the Year and first-team All-Arena honors for his performance during the 1991 season.

== Personal life ==
Barney is the nephew of NFL player Lem Barney and the father of baseball coach Milton Barney Jr.
