= Baton Rouge Kingfish (FPHL) =

Professional ice hockey team in Baton Rouge, Louisiana

- City: Baton Rouge, Louisiana
- League: Federal Prospects Hockey League
- Conference: Western
- Division: Delta
- Founded: 2026
- Home arena: Raising Cane's River Center Arena
- Colors: Navy, blue, cyan, green
- Owners: Matt Pace, Andreas Johansson, Ted Goldthorpe, Jacob Hector
- General manager: Cory Howerton
- Head coach: Jimmy Soper

The Baton Rouge Kingfish are a professional ice hockey team based in Baton Rouge, Louisiana. The team is a member of the Federal Prospects Hockey League (FPHL) and plays its home games at the Raising Cane's River Center Arena. The Kingfish are scheduled to begin play in the 2026–27 season.

The club takes its name from the Baton Rouge Kingfish of the ECHL, which played in the city from 1996 to 2003, and is the third professional hockey franchise to operate in Baton Rouge.

== History ==
=== Formation ===
The Baton Rouge Zydeco, which had brought professional hockey back to Baton Rouge in 2023, ceased operations in the spring of 2026 following its third season. The club never formally announced that it was folding; its president resigned and laid off the staff on May 1, 2026, and the FPHL said at the time that it was still evaluating the franchise's status. Accounts of the Kingfish's relationship to the Zydeco differ: the FPHL characterized the change as an ownership transition of the league's existing Baton Rouge franchise, while local coverage described the Zydeco as a previous franchise that had shuttered and the Kingfish as a new club under new owners.

On June 3, 2026, the FPHL and officials at the Raising Cane's River Center announced that a new ownership group would operate professional hockey in Baton Rouge beginning with the 2026–27 season. The group consists of Matt Pace, Andreas Johansson and Ted Goldthorpe, who together own the Binghamton Black Bears, along with Baton Rouge businessman Jacob Hector, who had previously sponsored the Zydeco. Pace, a partner at the law firm Rimon Law whose practice focuses on the sports and entertainment industry, previously served as executive director of Major League Lacrosse.

River Center general manager Wayne Hodes said the organization signed a three-year lease that requires the club to average 3,000 tickets sold per game after its first season; if the club does not meet that threshold, the arena may cancel the lease.

=== Branding ===
The team announced its name and logo on July 22, 2026. According to the organization, the Kingfish name references the freshwater sportfish found in Louisiana waterways, the nickname of former governor and U.S. senator Huey P. Long, and the earlier Baton Rouge Kingfish franchise. The name was selected privately by the ownership group, in contrast to the public naming contest used for the Zydeco in 2023, which drew more than 8,000 submissions.

The logo, designed by Madeleine Guillory, depicts a crowned fish biting a hockey puck. It omits the local landmarks used in the two previous Baton Rouge logos, a change the organization described as an effort to simplify the mark; the club said the new branding also allows it to use the original Kingfish logo on licensed retro merchandise.

=== Personnel ===
Jimmy Soper was named the franchise's first head coach. A nine-year professional, he most recently served as captain of the Knoxville Ice Bears of the Southern Professional Hockey League. Cory Howerton, previously vice president of ticketing for USL Spokane, was named general manager.

=== Inaugural season ===
The full 2026–27 regular season schedule was released on July 24, 2026. The Kingfish are scheduled to open at home on October 16, 2026 against the Monroe Moccasins.

== See also ==
- Baton Rouge Zydeco
