= Herkie Walls =

American football player (born 1961)

No. 82, 83, 84, 86
- Position: Wide receiver / Offensive specialist

Personal information
- Born: July 18, 1961 (age 65); Garland, Texas, U.S.
- Listed height: 5 ft 6 in (1.68 m)
- Listed weight: 159 lb (72 kg)

Career information
- High school: Garland
- College: Texas
- NFL draft: 1983: 7th round, 170th overall pick

Career history

Playing
- Houston Oilers (1983–1986); Tampa Bay Buccaneers (1986–1988); Orlando Predators (1991–1996); Sacramento Surge (1992)*
- * Offseason or practice squad member only

Coaching
- Orlando Predators (2023)

Awards and highlights
- Arena Football Hall of Fame inductee (2000); Second-team All-Arena (1991); First-team All-SWC (1982); 1980 Southwest Conference champion, 60 yard dash; 1982 Cotton Bowl champion

Career NFL statistics
- Receptions: 32
- Receiving yards: 587
- Receiving touchdowns: 2
- Kick return yards: 769
- Stats at Pro Football Reference

Career AFL statistics
- Receptions: 207
- Receiving yards: 2,910
- Receiving touchdowns: 45
- Kick return yards: 3,318
- Kick return touchdowns: 6
- Stats at ArenaFan.com

McCurey Hercules "Herkie" Walls (born July 18, 1961) is an American former professional football player who was a wide receiver in the National Football League (NFL). He played college football for the Texas Longhorns, where he also ran track, and was selected by the Houston Oilers in the seventh round of the 1983 NFL draft. He was also a member of the Tampa Bay Buccaneers.

Walls also played football for the Orlando Predators of the Arena Football League (AFL) and the Sacramento Surge of the World League of American Football (WLAF). He was selected to the Arena Football Hall of Fame in 2000. He was the head coach of the Orlando Predators of the National Arena League, a separate franchise from the AFL team of the same name, in 2023. Walls was also named to the 1980 United States Olympic track and field team, but did not participate in that year's Olympics due to the American boycott of the games.

== Early life ==
Herkie Walls went to Garland High School where he played quarterback and led the Owls through an undefeated regular season to a bi-district championship. He also won district championships in the 100, 220, long jump, and sprint relay. At the Texas relays he won the high school 100 meters in a record time of 10.42, which was the Texas High school record at the time (It would be beaten by Roy Martin in 1985. He ran a 6.18 in the indoor 55 meters which was the fastest time ever by a high school athlete not at altitude.

== College career ==
Walls started his college career at Texas in 1979 as a running back and returner and helped the team to the 1979 Sun Bowl and a #13 ranking.

In 1980, he was moved to wide receiver and had the 3rd most receptions for the team that year. He led the team in returns with 33, still 10th most in a season in school history, and helped the team to the 1980 Astro-Bluebonnet Bowl.

In 1981 he was replaced as a returner by Rob Moerschell but still helped the Longhorns to win the 1982 Cotton Bowl and finish the year ranked #2.

His standout season at Texas came in 1982. He was a consensus choice as All-Southwest Conference split end/flanker and led the NCAA for receiving yards per reception. He set several school records that year including most touchdown reception in a season (10), consecutive games with a touchdown reception (5), average yards per reception in a season (28.08) and average yards per reception in a career (25.8). The last two are still school records as of 2024. He had an 80 yard touchdown run against Missouri that was the school's 7th longest at the time and is still tied for 15th, and an 87 yard touchdown reception from halfback Darryl Clark against Texas A&M that was the 2nd longest in school history at the time and still ranks as 9th all-time. It's the longest not thrown by a quarterback in school history. It supplanted the 80 yard touchdown pass thrown by Robert Brewer earlier in the season against Baylor that was also 2nd longest in school history at the time (now tied for 13th). He led the team in receiving yards that season with 702 on 25 receptions and also carried the ball on nine rushes for 146 yards, an average of 16.2 yards per carry; and returned 6 kickoffs for 154 yards, an average of 25.7 yards per return. He had the 2nd most offensive yards for the Longhorns that year with 1,002, behind Clark. He helped the Longhorns to a winning season, to be runners-up in the Southwest Conference and to the 1982 Sun Bowl. He finished his career with 51 returns, which was the 2nd most in school history at the time.

Walls also ran track in college, lettering all four years. At the 1980 Southwest Texas Indoor Track and Field Championship, Walls finished first ahead of Curtis Dickey and Carl Lewis in the 60-yard dash (55 meters) and ran the fastest 55 meters in the world that year (tied with Dickey). He came in third place in the SWC meet 200 meters in both 1981 and 1982 and was sixth in the 100 meters in 1982. At the 1982 Texas Relays he was part of the team that set the school record in the 4x200 meter relay and then the 2nd fastest time the next year, both times are still in the school's top 5. Wells ran the three fastest 55-meter races, a discontinued event, in school history. His 10.16 time in the 100 meters in 1981 was the 2nd fastest in school history at the time and is still tied for 5th fastest.

== 1980 Olympics ==
Walls earned a place on the 1980 U.S. Olympic track team in the 4 x 100 relay, but did not participate in the games, as the United States boycotted the 1980 Olympics.

== Professional career ==
Walls was a seventh-round pick by the Houston Oilers in the 1983 NFL draft and also a 12th-round pick by the Boston Breakers in the 1983 USFL draft. He played in 31 games for the Oilers in the 1983 and 84 seasons, but was injured in the 1985 preseason, placed on the injured reserve and released by the team. They re-signed him in November and he played 6 more games for the Oilers, recording one reception.

He was released by the Oilers in the spring of 1986 and signed by Tampa Bay Buccaneers a few weeks later. He was released by them at the end of training camp that year. He was signed by them again the following winter and then released by them again during the 1987 training camp. A few weeks into the 1987 season the Buccaneers signed him again during the NFLPA strike and he played in two games, catching one pass and returning four punts and six kickoffs before injuring his knee and winding up on the injured reserve again. He became a free agent in 1988 but was not resigned by an NFL team.

In 1991, he joined the Arena Football League with the new Orlando Predators. That year he was named to the All-Arena second team as an offensive specialist/kick returner. He helped the Predators get to three Arena Bowls (VI, VIII and IX) but they came up short each time. During his 6 seasons he had 207 receptions for 2910 yards and 45 touchdowns, 30 rushes for 75 yards and three touchdowns and 192 returns for 3318 yards and six TDs. He caught at least one catch in everyone of the Predators games during that time.

In 1992 he was selected by the Sacramento Surge in the 17th round of the 1992 WLAF Draft (#178) but he was cut before the season started.

In 2000 he was inducted into the Arena Football Hall of Fame.

== Coaching career ==
After leaving football as a player, Walls spent time as a coach and administrator in indoor football.

Until 2003, he worked for the Predators as a community outreach relations director.

In 2007, he was hired as the coach of the Daytona Beach Thunderbirds but after only 2 games – both losses – he was fired.

On September 16, 2022, Walls was hired as the head coach for the Orlando Predators of the National Arena League (NAL). After leading the Predators to a 4–8 record and losing in the first round of the playoffs, he was let go as coach.

== Personal life ==
Walls now resides in Orlando, Florida. In addition to his coaching, he is a substitute bible teacher and preacher for The Master's Academy, where he has previously served as head football coach.
