= Sylvester Bembery =

American football player (born 1965)

Slyvester Bembery
No. 78
- Position: Offensive lineman / Defensive lineman

Personal information
- Born: March 1, 1965 (age 61)
- Listed height: 6 ft 3 in (1.91 m)
- Listed weight: 285 lb (129 kg)

Career information
- College: UCF
- NFL draft: 1988: undrafted

Career history
- New England Steamrollers (1988); Albany Firebirds (1990–1993); Tampa Bay Storm (1994–1999); Buffalo Destroyers (2000); Tampa Bay Storm (2001)

Awards and highlights
- 2× ArenaBowl champion (1995, 1996); 3× First-team All-Arena (1990, 1991, 1992); 3× Second-team All-Arena (1988, 1995, 1996); AFL All-Star Game (1993); AFL's 10th Anniversary Team (1996); AFL's 15th Anniversary Team – Second Team (2001); AFL's 20 Greatest Players – #7 (2006); AFL's 25 Greatest Players – #11 (2012); All-ArenaBowl Team (1999); Arena Football Hall of Fame (2011); Central Florida Hall of Fame (2009)

Career AFL statistics
- Receptions-Yards-TDs: 11–69–3
- Tackles: 135
- Sacks: 43
- FF-FR: 6–3
- Blocked FGs: 2
- Stats at ArenaFan.com

Sylvester Bembery (born March 1, 1965) is an American former professional football lineman in the Arena Football League (AFL). Bembery, #78, was an offensive and defensive lineman for the Tampa Bay Storm from 1994–99, and once again joined the Storm for the 2001 campaign.

== College career ==
Bembery started his career at the University of Central Florida, playing for them for four successful seasons. He was inducted into the UCF Hall of Fame in 2009. He came to the school in 1984, after playing prep ball at Miami Carroll City High School in South Florida. His impact was felt immediately and he helped put the UCF football program on the map. UCF was struggling and failed to record a winning season since the program's inaugural campaign in 1979. Bembery, however, shined on the Knights' defensive line. In 1985, the program faced off against their first NCAA Division I opponent in Louisville. The team lost, but the test was encouraging. The following season, UCF saw its first big attendance game with 23,760 on hand for the Homecoming matchup against Wofford. At 6–5, UCF put together its first winning season since 1979. During Bembery's senior campaign in 1987, the UCF defense held opponents to just 67 points all year. He was named lineman of the year in 1987.

== Professional career ==
=== New England Steamrollers ===
In 1988, Bembery joined the New England Steamrollers of the Arena Football League. Immediately, Bembery's force on the defensive line was evident. Then, he was asked to play on both sides of the ball and on the offensive line.

=== Albany Firebirds ===
Bembery took the next year off, then joined the Albany Firebirds in 1990. Although he did not win a championship, he was able to master his craft. "I really learned how to be an offensive lineman in Albany. I wanted to step up to the plate and be a man. If I had to spend the extra hours, learning my craft, that's what I was going to do. It took a while," Bembery said.

During those years, Bembery was named to the 1993 All Star Game and was a three-time member of the All-Arena First Team (1990–93). His vicious style of play became notorious around the AFL; however, the 6-foot-3-inch, 285-pound monster was known as a gentle giant off the field. "I wont lie about it, I grew into it," Bembery said about his "switch." "Like everybody in life, you have to know how to control yourself and conduct yourself both on and off the field. In order to play football, you have to have some nastiness. You have to know when to turn it on and off. What did that for me was wanting to be the best at my craft and not wanting to be defeated on the field. I still hadn't won a championship."

=== Tampa Bay Storm ===
He joined the Tampa Bay Storm in 1994. That year, the Storm advanced to the third round of the playoffs but his ArenaBowl hopes were shot with a loss to Orlando. The following season, head coach and AFL Hall of Famer Tim Marcum joined the Storm. During those years, Bembery was a Second Team All-Arena member, twice, and named to the 10th Anniversary Team.

=== Buffalo Destroyers ===
He would play the 1999 season with the Storm before joining the Buffalo Destroyers in 2000.

=== Return to the Tampa Bay Storm ===
He re-joined the Storm for his final year in 2001. Known as one of the Storm's greatest pass rushers, a 6-time All-Arena selection, Sylvester won 2 ArenaBowl Championships' with the Storm. In 2001, he helped the Storm win 7 straight games ending with a 58–51 overtime win over the Carolina Cobras. This was the longest streak the Storm put together since Bemery helped them win 9 straight games in 1998, and the longest Tampa Bay winning streak since when he contributed to 8 game streak they tore through to begin the 1996 season.

=== Career highlights ===
Bembery was named to the Arena Football League 10th Anniversary Team in 1996, and was the All-time AFL leader in sacks with 43 at the time of his retirement.

In 2002 his jersey was retired by Tampa Bay at the St. Pete Times Forum.

In 2006, Bembery ranked seventh among the 20 Greatest AFL Players and in 2009, he was inducted into the UCF Athletics Hall of Fame.

On August 12, 2011, Bembery was named to the 2011 AFL Hall of Fame class.

== After football ==
Currently, Sylvester Bembery is the CEO of B.E.M Services, LLC an agency that provides care services to persons with developmental disabilities in the Tampa Bay Area of Florida. "Arena Football taught me to be the man I am today, a respectable man in the community. Today, I work with the handicap and disabled. I love my job. I hope I can retire doing my job. I'm a positive person in my community. I mentor children and I try to teach them positive things. I help coach Little League football. There are a lot of things I'm trying to do. That's because of Arena Football. I am very grateful for the game. If I had to do it all over again, I would," Bembery said.
