= Aric Anderson =

American football player ()

No. 53
- Position: Fullback/Linebacker

Personal information
- Listed height: 6 ft 2 in (1.88 m)
- Listed weight: 225 lb (102 kg)

Career information
- High school: William Fremd
- College: Millikin
- NFL draft: 1987: undrafted

Career history
- Green Bay Packers (1987); Pittsburgh Gladiators (1989–1990); Detroit Drive (1991); Albany Firebirds (1992–1993)

Career NFL statistics
- Games played: 3
- Games started: 3
- Stats at Pro Football Reference

Career AFL statistics
- Rushes-Yards-TDs: 23-117-3
- Receptions-Yards-TDs: 63-193-10
- Tackles: 56
- Sacks: 6
- Forced Fumbles: 2
- Stats at ArenaFan.com

Aric Anderson a former linebacker in the National Football League who played for the Green Bay Packers and Arena Football League. In 1989–1993 Aric Anderson played Arena football; two years for Pittsburgh Gladiators, one year for Detroit Drive, and two years for Albany Firebirds. Anderson played collegiate ball at Millikin University. Anderson was an assistant coach for the Dallas Arena Football team (Vigilantes) for the 2010 & 2011 season. Aric Anderson is married to Lynnette and together they have four children, Courtney, Cristen, Brooke, and Rylee. Anderson now lives in Texas.
