= Lafayette Roughnecks =

Arena football team

Logo

General information
- Founded: 2000
- Folded: 2001
- Headquartered: Cajundome in Lafayette, Louisiana
- Colors: Blue, gold, white

Personnel
- Owners: Peter Kern; Frank Hebert; Keith Lamm; Shane Frey
- General manager: Ronnie Rantz
- Head coach: Dave Whinham

Team history
- Lafayette Roughnecks (2001)

Home fields
- Cajundome (2001)

League / conference affiliations
- af2 (2001): National Conference (2001); South Central Division (2001)

The Lafayette Roughnecks was arena football team based in Lafayette, Louisiana. The Roughnecks were members of the South Central Division of the National Conference of af2. They played their home games at the Cajundome (also the basketball home for the Louisiana-Lafayette Ragin' Cajuns). They only played for one season (3-13 record) before ceasing all operations after the season ended.

== Roughnecks front office staff ==
- Dave Whinham, Vice President
- Bill Verret, Statistical Operations
- Bill Heim, Stats

== Roughnecks coaching staff ==
- Buford Jordan, Head Coach (replaced during season by Whinham)
- Dave Whinham, Head Coach
- Broderick Fobbs, fullback and linebackers coach

== Season-by-season ==
Season records
Season	W	L	T	Finish	Playoff results
2001	3	13	0	6th NC South Central	--
