= Fran Curci =

American football player and coach (born 1938)

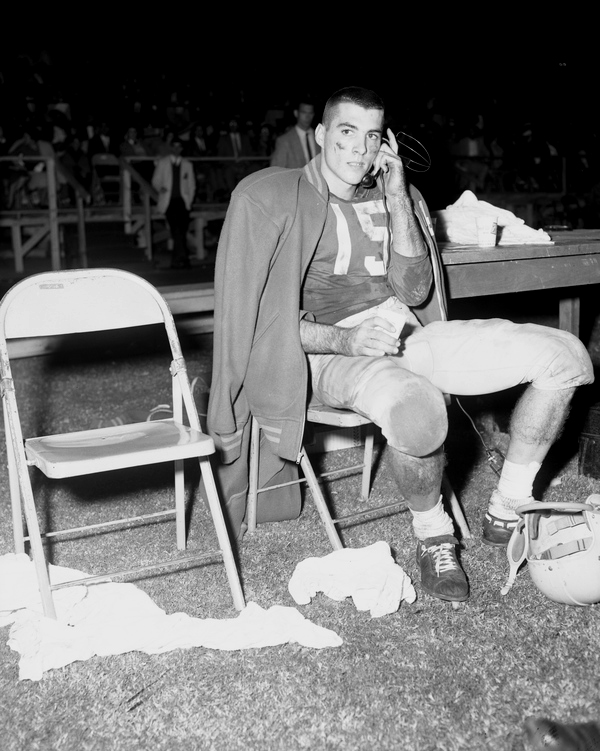
- Curci in 1957

Biographical details
- Born: June 11, 1938 (age 88); Pittsburgh, Pennsylvania, U.S.

Playing career
- 1957–1959: Miami (FL)
- 1960: Dallas Texans
- 1961: Fort Eustis
- Position: Quarterback

Coaching career (HC unless noted)
- 1961–1967: Miami (FL) (assistant)
- 1968–1970: Tampa
- 1971–1972: Miami (FL)
- 1973–1981: Kentucky
- 1991: Tampa Bay Storm
- 1992: Cincinnati Rockers

Head coaching record
- Overall: 81–70–2 (college)
- Bowls: 1–0

Accomplishments and honors

Championships
- ArenaBowl (1991)

Awards
- Second-team All-American (1959); SEC Coach of the Year (1977); AFL Coach of the Year (1991)

Fran Curci (born June 11, 1938) is an American former football player and coach. He served as head coach at the University of Tampa from 1968 to 1970, the University of Miami from 1971 to 1972 and the University of Kentucky from 1973 to 1981, compiling a career college football coaching record of 81–70–2.

== Playing career ==
Curci played quarterback at Miami from 1957 to 1959. For his career, he completed 187 of 356 passes for 1,937 yards, 13 touchdowns, and 26 interceptions. He also rushed for 830 yards and 6 touchdowns. He was a 1959 second-team All-American (Associated Press).

Curci was selected by the St. Paul-Minneapolis franchise in the 1960 American Football League draft. When Minneapolis pulled out of the league, his rights were transferred to Oakland. He was later traded to the Dallas Texans in exchange for Dalton Truax, which reunited him with former Miami assistant Hank Stram. He did not play for the Texans due to an injury.

An officer in the United States Army Reserve, Curci led the Fort Eustis team to a 25–24 victory over the Quantico Marines in the 1961 Missile Bowl.

== Coaching career ==
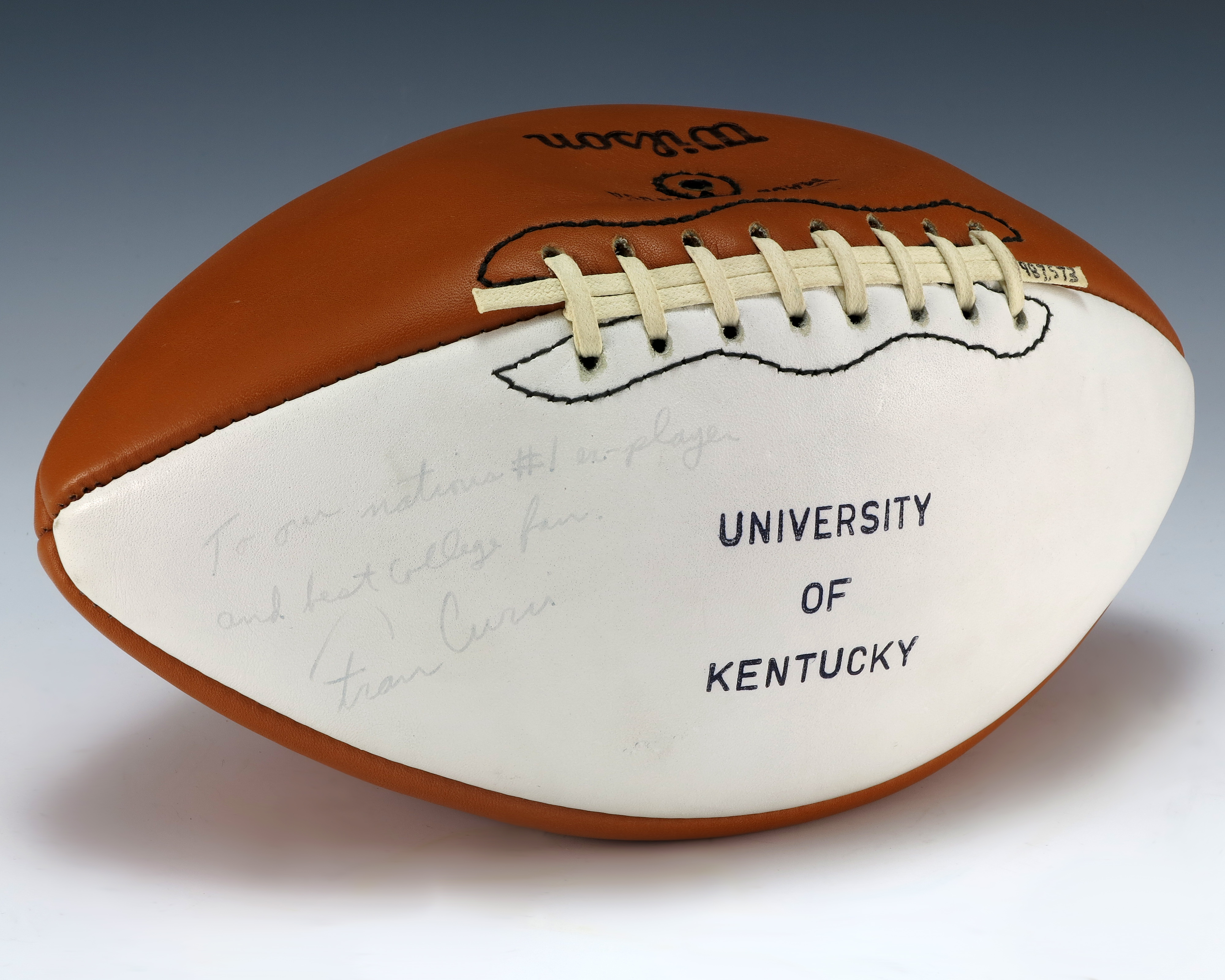
A football signed by Fran Curci and gifted to President Gerald Ford

Curci began his coaching career in 1961 as an assistant at his alma mater.

Curci led the University of Tampa Spartans to a 25–6 record in three seasons (1968–1970). After his team defeated the Miami Hurricanes at the Orange Bowl in 1970, and Tampa finished that season 10–1, he was hired by the University of Miami.

Curci's record at Miami was 9–13. He was head coach at the University of Miami during the infamous Florida Flop in 1971 when the Florida Gators defense allowed Miami to score a touchdown late in the fourth quarter by dropping to the ground mid-play. The defense wanted quarterback John Reaves to get the ball back and set an NCAA career passing record. Florida won the game 45–16. Curci was particularly upset at the Gators' actions since the game was well out of reach by then. He refused to shake hands with Florida coach Doug Dickey after the game, and was quoted as saying, "I lost all respect for [Dickey] as a coach and as a man. What he did shows no class... I think he made a fool of himself."

During his tenure at the University of Kentucky, Curci compiled a record of 47–51–2. The 1976 Kentucky Wildcats finished 9–3 and 5–1 in conference play—their first winning season in 13 years—and defeated North Carolina in the Peach Bowl 21–0, finishing ranked #18 in the final Associated Press poll. After that season, the Wildcats were slapped with two years' probation for numerous recruiting and amateurism violations. The Wildcats were also banned from bowl games and live television in 1977, and limited to only 25 scholarships in 1977 and 1978.

The 1977 team finished 10–1, including a win at #4 Penn State and an undefeated record in conference play though they were ineligible for the title due to probation. They finished the season ranked #6 in the final Associated Press poll. It was only the second 10-win season in school history.

Due in part to the loss of scholarships from the 1976 infractions case, Curci was never able to put together another winning team. In his last four years, he only won eight games in SEC play. Curci's tenure as Kentucky's coach ended after nine seasons, then the longest of any Kentucky coach (but since surpassed by Mark Stoops). In his final game as Kentucky's coach, Curci led the Wildcats to a 21–10 victory over Tennessee on November 21, 1981.

Curci later coached in the Arena Football League with the Tampa Bay Storm in 1991, and the Cincinnati Rockers in 1992. He led the Storm, quarterbacked by future Washington Redskins head coach Jay Gruden, to an ArenaBowl V championship and was named Coach of the Year in his only season with Tampa Bay. Curci also did radio broadcasts for Tampa Bay Buccaneers and college football games.

== Late life ==
After leaving coaching, Curci served as Parks Commissioner for the Commonwealth of Kentucky.

== Head coaching record ==
=== College ===
Year	Team	Overall	Conference	Standing	Bowl/playoffs	Coaches^{#}	AP^{°}
Tampa Spartans (NCAA College Division independent) (1968–1970)
1968	Tampa	7–3					
1969	Tampa	8–2					
1970	Tampa	10–1					
Tampa:		25–6					
Miami Hurricanes (NCAA University Division independent) (1971–1972)
1971	Miami	4–7					
1972	Miami	5–6					
Miami:		9–13					
Kentucky Wildcats (Southeastern Conference) (1973–1981)
1973	Kentucky	5–6	3–4	T–5th			
1974	Kentucky	6–5	3–3	T–4th			
1975	Kentucky	2–8–1	0–6	10th			
1976	Kentucky	8–4	4–2	T–3rd	W Peach	19	18
1977	Kentucky	10–1	6–0	T–1st ‡	‡	‡	6
1978	Kentucky	4–6–1	2–4	T–7th			
1979	Kentucky	5–6	3–3	T–5th			
1980	Kentucky	3–8	1–5	8th			
1981	Kentucky	3–8	2–4	T–6th			
Kentucky:		47–51–2	25–30	‡ Ineligible for SEC title, bowl game and Coaches Poll			
Total:		81–70–2					
^{#}Rankings from final Coaches Poll.; ^{°}Rankings from final AP Poll.
