= John Corker =

American football player (born 1958)

No. 88, 57, 53
- Positions: Linebacker, offensive line, defensive line

Personal information
- Born: December 29, 1958 (age 67); Miami, Florida, U.S.
- Listed height: 6 ft 6 in (1.98 m)
- Listed weight: 245 lb (111 kg)

Career information
- High school: South Miami (Glenvar Heights, Florida)
- College: Oklahoma State
- NFL draft: 1980: 5th round, 134th overall pick

Career history
- Houston Oilers (1980–1982); Michigan Panthers (1983–1984); Memphis Showboats (1985); Miami Dolphins (1986)*; Green Bay Packers (1988); Detroit Drive (1988–1993); Miami Hooters (1994–1995)
- * Offseason or practice squad member only

Awards and highlights
- 4× ArenaBowl champion (1988, 1989, 1990, 1992); 2× All-USFL (1983, 1984); USFL All-Time Team; First-team All-Arena - OL/DL (1991); AFL Lineman of the Year (1991); AFL's 10th Anniversary Team (1996); AFL 20 Greatest Players - 19 (2006); AFL 25 Greatest Players - 14 (2012); AFL Hall of Fame (2002); First-team All-American (1978); Big Eight Defensive Player of the Year (1978); First-team All-Big Eight (1978)

Career NFL statistics
- Sacks: 1
- Fumble recoveries: 1
- Touchdowns: 1
- Stats at Pro Football Reference
- Stats at ArenaFan.com

John B. Corker (born December 29, 1958) is an American former professional football player who was a linebacker for four seasons in the National Football League (NFL), primarily for the Houston Oilers. He also played eight seasons in the Arena Football League (AFL). In 2002, Corker was elected into the Arena Football League Hall of Fame.

Corker was named Big-8 Defensive Player of the Year in 1978 despite playing in only 7 games prior to tearing ligaments in his knee. He returned in 1979 and was 2nd team All Big-8 and All-American.

He also played with the Michigan Panthers and the Memphis Showboats of the United States Football League (USFL). Corker graduated from South Miami High School in 1976 (South Miami, Florida,) where he played football and basketball.

Corker was named USFL Defensive Player of the Year in 1983 after recording 28.5 sacks in 18 games while playing with the Michigan Panthers. Corker's efforts also led the Panthers to the USFL Championship that same season.

After the Panthers merged with the Oakland Invaders before the 1985 USFL season, Corker signed with the Memphis Showboats. One of his defensive mates was future NFL Hall of Famer, Reggie White. Corker finished his 3-year USFL career with 42 sacks in 54 games.

In 1994 Corker resurfaced with the Arena Football League's Miami Hooters playing 7 games for head coach Don Strock.
