= New Orleans Night =

Arena football team

- Founded: 1991
- Folded: 1992
- Team history: New Orleans Night (1991–1992)
- Based in: Louisiana Superdome in New Orleans
- Home arena: Louisiana Superdome (1991–1992)
- League: Arena Football League (1991–1992): American Conference (1991–1992); South Division (1992)
- Colors: Midnight blue, orange, white

Personnel
- Head coach: Vince Gibson
- Owners: Mike McBath; Bill Hampton; David Briggs

The New Orleans Night were an Arena Football League (AFL) team that competed in the 1991 and 1992 AFL seasons and were based in New Orleans, Louisiana. The team was officially announced at a press conference on March 18, 1991. On April 9, the name Night was unveiled as was Eddie Khayat, former head coach of the Nashville Kats, as head coach.

== History ==
The Night played their home games inside the massive Louisiana Superdome, also home of the NFL New Orleans Saints, which obviously had to be modified considerably to cut the playing surface and fan seating down to a size appropriate to fit arena football. The Superdome used its basketball configuration, previously used for the New Orleans Jazz NBA team and for some special college basketball games and tournament play, for arena football. Using this setup, the dome still had a capacity of 30,000 for the Night. Also, during the 1992 season, the Night used a huge blue curtain to close off the rest of the unused dome, to give a smaller arena feel to it. Team colors were Midnight Blue, Sunset Orange, and Moonlight White. The Night wore Zubaz designed uniforms used during the 1991 season.

The team was disbanded after a winless 1992 season.

== Notable players ==
=== Individual awards ===
Ironman of the Year
Season	Player	Position
1991	Milton Barney	WR/DB

=== All-Arena players ===
The following Night players were named to All-Arena Teams:

- WR/DB Milton Barney (1)
- OL/DL Johnny Sims (1), Doc Wise (1)
- K Marco Morales (1)

== Head coaches ==
Name	Term	Regular season				Playoffs		Awards
Name	Term	W	L	T	Win%	W	L	Awards
Eddie Khayat	1991	4	6	0	.400	0	0	
Vince Gibson	1992	0	10	0	.000	0	0	

== Season-by-season ==
Season records
Season	W	L	T	Finish	Playoff results
1991	4	6	0		
1992	0	10	0		
Totals	4	16	0		

== Media ==
- The team appeared on the game EA Sports Arena Football as a hidden bonus team.
