= ArenaBowl V =

Tampa Bay Storm (2nd)	Detroit Drive (1st)
48	42
	1	2	3	4	Total
TB	7	21	14	6	48
DET	14	7	9	12	42
- Date: August 17, 1991
- Stadium: Joe Louis Arena; Detroit, Michigan
- MVP: Stevie Thomas, WR/LB, Tampa Bay: Darren Willis, WR/DB, Tampa Bay (Ironman of the Game)
- Attendance: 20,357
- Winning coach: Fran Curci
- Losing coach: Tim Marcum

TV in the United States
- Network: Prime Network
- Announcers: Bill Land, Tony Hill, Howard Balzer

ArenaBowl '91 (or ArenaBowl V) was the Arena Football League's fifth ArenaBowl. The game featured the #2 Tampa Bay Storm (8–2) against the #1 Detroit Drive (9–1). The Storm were in their first season in Tampa, Florida since moving from Pittsburgh, Pennsylvania and having spent their first four seasons as the Pittsburgh Gladiators, while the Drive were trying to win an unprecedented fourth-straight ArenaBowl title.

== Game summary ==
In the first quarter, the Storm struck first with Quarterback Jay Gruden getting a one-yard touchdown run, yet the Drive responded with Quarterback Art Schlichter completing a 10-yard touchdown pass to WR/DB Gary Mullen and a 32-yard touchdown pass to OS George LaFrance.

In the second quarter, Tampa Bay struck back with Gruden completing a 13-yard touchdown pass to WR/LB Stevie Thomas. Detroit responded with FB/LB Alvin Rettig, the Storm began to take control with FB/LB Lynn Bradford getting a three-yard touchdown run, while Gruden and Thomas hooked up with each other again on a 42-yard touchdown pass.

In the third quarter, the Drive answered with Schlichter completing a 13-yard touchdown pass to WR/LB Will McClay, while the Storm replied with Gruden completing a 37-yard touchdown pass to WR/DB Darren Willis. While Detroit could only answer with Kicker Novo Bojovic getting a 46-yard field goal, Tampa Bay increased its lead with Gruden hooking up with Thomas again with a 17-yard touchdown pass.

In the fourth quarter, the Drive tried to come back with Schlichter and Mullen hooking up again on a 23-yard touchdown pass (with a failed PAT) and FB/LB Aric Anderson getting a one-yard touchdown run (with a failed two-point conversion), the Storm wrapped the game up with Gruden and Thomas hooking up with each other once more on a 35-yard touchdown pass.

With the win, not only did Tampa Bay win its first-ever ArenaBowl title, but they also prevented Detroit from winning its fourth consecutive league title.

== Scoring summary ==
1st Quarter

- TB – Gruden 1 run (Hickert kick)
- DET – Mullen 10 pass from Schlichter (Bojovic kick)
- DET – LaFrance 32 pass from Schlichter (Bojovic kick)

2nd Quarter

- TB – Thomas 13 pass from Gruden (Hickert kick)
- DET – Rettig 2 run (Bojovic kick)
- TB – Bradford 3 run (Hickert kick)
- TB – Thomas 42 pass from Gruden (Hickert Kick)

3rd Quarter

- DET – McClay 13 pass from Schlichter (Bojovic kick failed)
- TB – Willis 37 pass from Gruden (Hickert kick)
- DET – FG Bojovic 46
- TB – Thomas 17 pass from Gruden (Hickert kick)

4th Quarter

- DET – Mullen 23 pass from Schlichter (Bojovic kick failed)
- DET – Anderson 1 run (Schlichter pass failed)
- TB – Thomas 35 pass from Gruden (Hickert kick failed)

== Trivia ==
- On the Arena Football League's 20 Greatest Highlights Countdown (which was shown on arenafootball.com during the AFL's 20th season), this game is a #5.
