= Taft Coliseum =

Arena in Columbus, Ohio

- "The Barn"
- Interactive map of Taft Coliseum
- Former names: Fairgrounds Coliseum, Ohio Expo Center Coliseum
- Location: 717 E. 17th Ave, Columbus, Ohio 43221
- Coordinates: 39.998454°N 82.9924°W
- Owner: Ohio Expo Center & State Fair
- Operator: Ohio Expo Center & State Fair
- Capacity: 5,003
- Surface: concrete

Construction
- Opened: 1918
- Renovated: 2005

Tenants
- Ohio State Buckeyes (NCAA) (1918–1956); Columbus Athletic Supply (MBC/NBL) (1936–1938); Columbus Checkers (IHL) (1966–1970); Columbus Golden Seals/Owls (IHL) (1971–1977); Columbus Horizon (CBA) (1989–1992); Columbus Chill (ECHL) (1991–1999); Columbus Thunderbolts (AFL) (1991); Columbus Stars (UHL) (2003–2004)

The Taft Coliseum is a 5,003-permanent seat multi-purpose arena located at the Ohio Expo Center and State Fairgrounds in Columbus, Ohio.

== History ==
It opened in 1918 and is nicknamed "The Barn". The facility hosted the 1929 NCAA Wrestling Championships.

The Coliseum has become a legendary and traditional high school basketball venue. It hosted OHSAA central district and regional playoffs in boys' High School basketball until 2013, when the Central District Athletic Board opted to move games to Ohio Dominican University. During each fall and winter the Coliseum is also home to Columbus Ice Hockey Club (CIHC) and CCYHA youth hockey. It recently has been acquired by The Chiller and is used as a public rink for games and practices.

It was also once home to the Ohio State University men's basketball team, Columbus Horizon CBA basketball team, Columbus Thunderbolts Arena Football League team, and the Columbus Stars and Columbus Chill ice hockey teams.

The Barn was renovated in 2005 to include new scoreboards, the addition of shot clocks above the backboards, a fresh coat of paint, and new rest rooms. On July 28, 2010, the Coliseum was renamed to honor Bob Taft, the 67th Governor of Ohio.
