= Cleveland Thunderbolts =

Arena football team in Ohio, US

Logo

General information
- Founded: 1991
- Folded: 1994
- Headquartered: Cleveland, Ohio and Columbus, Ohio
- Colors: Black, purple, silver, white

Personnel
- Owner: John J. Kuczek (Cleveland)
- Head coach: Earle Bruce

Team history
- Columbus Thunderbolts (1991); Cleveland Thunderbolts (1992–1994)

Home fields
- Ohio Expo Center Coliseum (1991); Richfield Coliseum (1992–1994)

League / conference affiliations
- Arena Football League (1991–1994): Northern Division (1992); American Conference (1993–1994)

Playoff appearances (1)
- 1992

The Cleveland Thunderbolts were an arena football team based in Richfield, Ohio. The Thunderbolts were founded in 1991 and were a member of the Arena Football League (AFL). In 1994, the franchise relocated to Columbus The team played for four seasons total, making the playoffs once. They played their home games in the Richfield Coliseum. The team was moved to Cleveland by John J. Kuczek.

== History ==
=== Columbus Thunderbolts ===
Established as the Columbus Thunderbolts and playing its home games at the Expo Coliseum, the team relocated to Cleveland after 1991 season in the Arena Football League in 1991.

Perhaps the highlight of the team's one year in Columbus was the play of quarterback Major Harris, who rushed for 429 yards during that season, an achievement given the predominance of passing in the play of the AFL. His record was broken however in 2005 when Michael Bishop ran for 459 yards. The team was sold to John Kuczak and relocated to Cleveland.

=== Cleveland Thunderbolts ===
The Thunderbolts operated in the Cleveland area for three seasons, playing their home games in the suburban Richfield Coliseum, a considerable distance from downtown Cleveland, sharing it with the Cleveland Cavaliers of the National Basketball Association and the Cleveland Crunch of the National Professional Soccer League. The team qualified for the playoffs in the 1992 season, but was relocated to Columbus after the 1994 campaign.

Early in the T-Bolts short existence in Cleveland, John Kuczek was implicated in a federal securities fraud case in Florida. Prior to the team's second season in 1993, Kuczek divested himself of ownership in the club and placed it in a trust for his grandchildren. Son Jeff continued as the front office leader of the organization. Kuczek was ultimately convicted on one count of the indictment. The day before he was due to begin serving his sentence in February 1995, he committed suicide in a Salem, Ohio hotel room.

=== Revival of the AFL in Columbus and Cleveland ===
Thirteen years after the Thunderbolts played their lone season in Columbus, the city would see the AFL return when the Columbus Destroyers relocated from Buffalo and played five seasons (2004–2008) at Nationwide Arena. After a 10-year hiatus, the team was relaunched for the 2019 season.

Cleveland was also without an arena football team for 13 years until the Cleveland Gladiators moved from Las Vegas in 2008. The team has been on hiatus since the 2018 season due to the renovation of Rocket Mortgage FieldHouse.

== Season-by-season ==
| ArenaBowl champions | ArenaBowl appearance | Division champions | Playoff berth |

| Season | Team | League | Conference | Division | Regular season | | | Postseason results |
| Season | Team | League | Conference | Division | Finish | Wins | Losses | Postseason results |
|---|---|---|---|---|---|---|---|---|
Columbus Thunderbolts
| 1991 | 1991 | AFL | — | — | 8th | 0 | 10 | |
Cleveland Thunderbolts
| 1992 | 1992 | AFL | — | Northern | 4th | 4 | 6 | Lost Quarterfinals (Orlando) 12–50 |
| 1993 | 1993 | AFL | American | — | 4th | 2 | 10 | |
| 1994 | 1994 | AFL | American | — | 5th | 2 | 10 | |
| Total | | | | | | 8 | 36 | (includes only regular season) |
| Total | | | | | | 0 | 1 | (includes only the postseason) |
| Total | | | | | | 8 | 37 | (includes both regular season and postseason) |

== Notable players ==
=== All-Arena players ===
The following Thunderbolts players were named to All-Arena Teams:

- OL/DL Willie Fears (1)

== Head coaches ==
| Name | Term | Regular season | | | | Playoffs | | Awards |
| Name | Term | W | L | T | Win% | W | L | Awards |
|---|---|---|---|---|---|---|---|---|
| Dave Whinham | 1991-1993 | 6 | 26 | 0 | .188 | 0 | 1 | |
| Earle Bruce | 1994 | 2 | 10 | 0 | .167 | 0 | 0 | |

== Notes ==
- The team appeared on the game EA Sports Arena Football as a hidden bonus team, as well as the sequel Arena Football: Road to Glory.
