= 1991 Arena Football League season =

- League: Arena Football League
- Sport: Arena football
- Duration: June 1, 1991 – August 3, 1991

Regular season
- Season champions: Detroit Drive
- Season MVP: George LaFrance, DET

League postseason
- 1 vs 4 Semifinals champions: Detroit Drive
- 1 vs 4 Semifinals runners-up: Albany Firebirds
- 2 vs 3 Semifinals champions: Tampa Bay Storm
- 2 vs 3 Semifinals runners-up: Denver Dynamite

ArenaBowl V
- Champions: Tampa Bay Storm
- Runners-up: Detroit Drive
- Finals MVP: Stevie Thomas, TB

AFL seasons
- ← 1990 1992 →

AFL teams

The 1991 Arena Football League season was the fifth season of the Arena Football League (AFL). The league champions were the Tampa Bay Storm, who defeated the Detroit Drive in ArenaBowl V.

== Standings ==
1991 Arena Football League standings
Team	W	L	T	PCT	PF	PA	PF (Avg.)	PA (Avg.)	STK
xy-Detroit Drive	9	1	0	.900	437	262	43.7	26.2	W 4
x-Tampa Bay Storm	8	2	0	.800	421	309	42.1	30.9	W 2
x-Denver Dynamite	6	4	0	.600	389	365	38.9	36.5	L 1
x-Albany Firebirds	6	4	0	.600	427	342	42.7	34.2	W 1
New Orleans Night	4	6	0	.400	314	401	31.4	40.1	L 1
Dallas Texans	4	6	0	.400	286	334	28.6	33.4	W 1
Orlando Predators	3	7	0	.300	321	363	32.1	36.3	L 2
Columbus Thunderbolts	0	10	0	.000	241	460	24.1	46	L 10

y – clinched regular-season title

x – clinched playoff spot

== Playoffs ==
Semifinals
1	Detroit	37
4	Albany	35
2	Tampa Bay	40
3	Denver	13

ArenaBowl V
1	Detroit	42
2	Tampa Bay	48

== Awards and honors ==
=== Regular season awards ===
Award	Winner	Position	Team
Most Valuable Player	George LaFrance	Wide Receiver/Defensive Back	Detroit Drive
Ironman of the Year	Milton Barney	Wide Receiver/Defensive Back	New Orleans Night
Lineman of the Year	John Corker	Offensive/Defensive Lineman	Detroit Drive
Kicker of the Year	Rusty Fricke	Kicker	Denver Dynamite
Coach of the Year	Fran Curci	Head coach	Tampa Bay Storm

=== All-Arena team ===
Position	First team	Second team
Quarterback	Tom Porras, Albany	Art Schlichter, Detroit
Fullback/Linebacker	Lynn Bradford, Tampa Bay	Alvin Rettig, Detroit
Wide receiver/Defensive back	Milton Barney, New Orleans; Wayne Coffey, Denver; Sam Moore, Dallas	Gary Mullen, Detroit; Merv Mosely, Albany; Fred Gayles, Albany
Offensive specialist/Kick returner	George LaFrance, Detroit	Herkie Walls, Orlando
Offensive lineman/Defensive lineman	Sylvester Bembery, Albany; Joe March, Denver; John Corker, Detroit	Johnny Sims, New Orleans; Flint Fleming, Detroit; Tom Gizzi, Tampa Bay
Defensive specialist	Tate Randle, Detroit	Alvin Williams, Denver
Kicker	Rusty Fricke, Denver	Marco Morales, New Orleans

== Team notes ==
# of Teams	Expansion Teams	Folded Teams	Suspended Teams	Teams returning from previous season	Teams returning after hiatus	Relocated Teams	Name Changes
8	Columbus Thunderbolts; New Orleans Night; Orlando Predators	Washington Commandos		Albany Firebirds; Dallas Texans; Denver Dynamite; Detroit Drive; Tampa Bay Storm		Pittsburgh → Tampa Bay Storm	
