= 1990 Dallas Texans season =

Arena Football League team season

1990 Dallas Texans (arena football) season
- Owner: Lainer Richey
- Head coach: Ernie Stautner
- Home stadium: Reunion Arena

Results
- Record: 6–2
- Division place: 2nd
- Playoffs: Won Semi-Finals (Dynamite) 26-25; Lost ArenaBowl IV (Drive) 27–51

The 1990 Dallas Texans season was the first season for the Texans. They finished with a record of 6–2.

== Regular season ==
=== Schedule ===
Week	Date	Opponent	Results		Game site
Week	Date	Opponent	Final score	Team record	Game site
1	June 8	Denver Dynamite	W 50–47	1–0	Reunion Arena
2	June 16	Pittsburgh Gladiators	L 40–35	2–0	Reunion Arena
3	June 23	at Albany Firebirds	L 34–46	2–1	Knickerbocker Arena
4	June 29	at Detroit Drive	L 14–53	2–2	Joe Louis Arena
5	July 7	at Washington Commandos	W 49–38	3–2	Patriot Center
6	July 14	Detroit Drive	W 33–29	4–2	Reunion Arena
7	July 20	at Denver Dynamite	W 42–32	5–2	McNichols Sports Arena
8	July 28	Washington Commandos	W 37–28	6–2	Reunion Arena

=== Standings ===
1990 Arena Football League standings
Team	W	L	T	PCT	PF	PA	PF (Avg.)	PA (Avg.)	STK
xy-Detroit Drive	6	2	0	.750	326	215	40.7	26.9	W 2
x-Dallas Texans	6	2	0	.750	299	308	37.4	38.5	W 4
x-Denver Dynamite	4	4	0	.500	283	267	35.4	33.4	L 3
x-Pittsburgh Gladiators	3	5	0	.375	289	287	36.1	35.9	L 1
Albany Firebirds	3	5	0	.375	188	268	23.5	33.5	W 1
Washington Commandos	2	6	0	.250	244	284	30.5	35.5	L 2

y – clinched regular-season title

x – clinched playoff spot

== Playoffs ==
Round	Date	Opponent	Results		Game site
Round	Date	Opponent	Final score	Team record	Game site
Semi-finals	August 4	Denver Dynamite	W 26–25	1–0	Reunion Arena
ArenaBowl IV	August 11	at Detroit Drive	L 27–51	1–1	Joe Louis Arena

== Roster ==
1990 Dallas Texans roster
Quarterbacks: 5 Ben Bennett; -- Bryan Brock; -- Lionel James; Wide Receivers/Defensive Backs: 84 Carl Aikens, Jr.; -- Robert Allen; 33 Byron Clay; 26 Aatron Kenney; 1 Tony Newsom; 3 Marcell Smith	Running Backs/Linebackers: -- Alvin Blackmon; -- Roscoe Tatum; 44 Mitchell Ward; Offensive Linemen/Defensive Linemen: -- Pete Endre; 65 Jeff Hurd; -- Joey Nanus; -- David Schell; 77 Bobby Sign; 89 Keith Williams; -- Buddy Wyatt	Wide Receivers/Linebackers: 88 Sam Moore; -- Alex Morris; 27 Kennedy Wilson; Kickers: 7 Marco Morales; Rookies in italics Roster updated March 15, 2013; 23 Active, 0 Inactive, 0 PS → More rosters

== Awards ==
Position	Player	Award	All-Arena team
Head coach	Ernie Stautner	Coach of the Year	–
Wide Receiver/Defensive Back	Carl Aikens, Jr.	none	1st
Fullback/Linebacker	Mitchell Ward	none	1st
Quarterback	Ben Bennett	none	2nd
