= 1990 Detroit Drive season =

Arena Football League team season

- Head coach: Perry Moss
- Home stadium: Joe Louis Arena

Results
- Record: 6–2
- Division place: 1st
- Playoffs: Won Semi-Finals (Gladiators) 61-30; Won ArenaBowl IV (Dallas Texans) 51–27
- Team MVP: Art Schlichter

The 1990 Detroit Drive season was the third season for the Drive. They finished 6–2 and won ArenaBowl IV. Quarterback Art Schlichter was named the league MVP.

== Regular season ==
=== Schedule ===
Week	Date	Opponent	Results		Game site
Week	Date	Opponent	Final score	Team record	Game site
1	June 8	at Pittsburgh Gladiators	W 43–35	1–0	Civic Arena
2	June 16	at Washington Commandos	W 52–28	2–0	Patriot Center
3	June 22	Denver Dynamite	L 22–35	2–1	Joe Louis Arena
4	June 29	Dallas Texans	W 53–14	3–1	Joe Louis Arena
5	July 6	at Albany Firebirds	W 50–21	4–1	Knickerbocker Arena
6	July 14	at Dallas Texans	L 14–53	4–2	Reunion Arena
7	July 20	Albany Firebirds	W 37–16	5–2	Joe Louis Arena
8	July 27	Pittsburgh Gladiators	W 40–33	6–2	Joe Louis Arena

=== Standings ===
1990 Arena Football League standings
Team	W	L	T	PCT	PF	PA	PF (Avg.)	PA (Avg.)	STK
xy-Detroit Drive	6	2	0	.750	326	215	40.7	26.9	W 2
x-Dallas Texans	6	2	0	.750	299	308	37.4	38.5	W 4
x-Denver Dynamite	4	4	0	.500	283	267	35.4	33.4	L 3
x-Pittsburgh Gladiators	3	5	0	.375	289	287	36.1	35.9	L 1
Albany Firebirds	3	5	0	.375	188	268	23.5	33.5	W 1
Washington Commandos	2	6	0	.250	244	284	30.5	35.5	L 2

y – clinched regular-season title

x – clinched playoff spot

== Playoffs ==
Round	Date	Opponent	Results		Game site
Round	Date	Opponent	Final score	Team record	Game site
Semi-finals	August 3	Pittsburgh Gladiators	W 61–30	1–0	Joe Louis Arena
ArenaBowl IV	August 11	Dallas Texans	W 51–27	2–0	Joe Louis Arena

== Roster ==
1990 Detroit Drive roster
Quarterbacks: 7 Art Schlichter; 17 Mike Trigg; Wide Receivers/Defensive Backs: -- Robert Banks; 89 Dwayne Dixon; -- David Evans; 27 James Flowers; 26 Steve Griffin; 82 Darrell Grymes; 1 Gary Mullen	Running Backs/Linebackers: 33 Lynn Bradford; -- Yepi Pauu; 44 Alvin Rettig; Offensive Linemen/Defensive Linemen: 55 Arnold Campbell; 88 John Corker; -- Flint Fleming; -- William Harris; 77 Reggie Mathis; 65 Greg Orton; 62 Jon Roehlk	Wide Receivers/Linebackers: -- Wade Lockett; -- Will McClay; 29 Tate Randle; Kickers: 3 Novo Bojovic; Rookies in italics Roster updated March 13, 2013; 23 Active, 0 Inactive, 0 PS → More rosters

== Awards ==
Position	Player	Award	All-Arena team
Quarterback	Art Schlichter	Most Valuable Player	1st
Kicker	Novo Bojovic	Kicker of the Year	1st
Wide Receiver/Defensive Back	Gary Mullen	none	1st/2nd
Fullback/Linebacker	Alvin Rettig	none	2nd
Offensive/Defensive Lineman	Greg Orton	none	2nd
Defensive Specialist	Tate Randle	none	2nd
