= Joe Haering =

American football player (1946–2022)

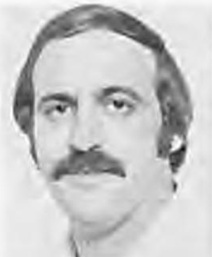
- Haering in 1979

Personal information
- Born: February 1, 1946; Pittsburgh, Pennsylvania, U.S.
- Died: 2022 (aged 76)

Career information
- Position: Linebacker
- High school: Central Catholic (Pittsburgh)
- College: Bucknell

Career history

Coaching
- 1968 Bucknell (LB); 1969–1970 Kentucky (Freshmen); 1971–1972 Kentucky (Offensive backfield); 1973 Boston University (OL); 1974 Boston University (OC); 1975 Kent State (Offensive backfield); 1976 Kent State (DL); 1977 Kent State (DC); 1978 New York Jets (LB/ST); 1979 New York Jets (LB); 1980 Hamilton Tiger-Cats (OL/offensive backfield); 1983 Chicago Blitz (LB); 1984 Pittsburgh Maulers (DC/LB); 1985 Denver Gold (DC); 1987–1990 Pittsburgh Gladiators (HC); 1991–1992 New York/New Jersey Knights (DC); 1993 Cincinnati Rockers (HC); 1994 Atlanta Falcons (LB); 1995 Atlanta Falcons (DC); 1996 Atlanta Falcons (LB); 2009–2012 SMU (LB)

Operations
- 1997–2008 Buffalo Bills (College scout)

Joseph Haering (February 1, 1946 – early 2022) was an American professional football coach. He was the head coach for the Pittsburgh Gladiators and Cincinnati Rockers of the Arena Football League (AFL). He was also the defensive coordinator for the Atlanta Falcons of the National Football League (NFL).

== Early life ==
Joseph Haering was born on February 1, 1946, in Pittsburgh, Pennsylvania. He played high school football at Central Catholic High School in Pittsburgh as a quarterback, and earned All-Catholic honors.

Haering played college football for the Bucknell Bison as a linebacker, and earned all-conference honors. After graduating from Bucknell, he served in the United States Army as a first lieutenant and company commander during the Vietnam War.

== Coaching career ==
Haering began his coaching career in 1968 as the linebackers coach at Bucknell. He was then the freshman coach at Kentucky from 1969 to 1970, and the offensive backfield coach from 1971 to 1972. He moved to Boston University, where he served as offensive line coach in 1973 and offensive coordinator in 1974. Haering was then the offensive backfield coach at Kent State in 1975, the defensive line coach in 1976, and the defensive coordinator in 1977.

Haering began his professional football coaching career in 1978 with the New York Jets, serving as linebackers/special teams coach during the 1978 season. He was solely linebackers coach for the Jets in 1979.

In 1980, Haering was the offensive line/offensive backfield coach for the Hamilton Tiger-Cats of the Canadian Football League. He then served as a coach for all three seasons of the United States Football League; he was the Chicago Blitz' linebackers coach in 1983, the Pittsburgh Maulers' defensive coordinator/linebackers coach in 1984, and the Denver Gold's defensive coordinator in 1985.

In 1987, Haering was one of four head coaches for the inaugural season of the Arena Football League (AFL). He served as the head coach of the AFL's Pittsburgh Gladiators from 1987 to 1990. He was suspended indefinitely after "slugging" AFL president Jim Foster during a benches-clearing brawl on July 22, 1989, against the Chicago Bruisers. The brawl started after Bruisers quarterback Ben Bennett hit a Gladiators player from behind. The referees ruled that Bennett and another Gladiators player had been ejected from the game. However, Foster intervened and said that Bennett should stay in the game because the fans wanted to see him play. Haering then threatened to withdraw his entire team from the game in protest. Foster ran onto the field and Haering "decked him with one punch", stating "I felt threatened and would do what any guy from East Pittsburgh would do". Foster later said the hit was a cheap shot. Haering ended up missing two games but was reinstated from suspension in time for the playoffs. However, interim head coach Darrel Jackson was credited as the coach of record for the postseason.

Haering was the defensive coordinator for the New York/New Jersey Knights of the upstart World League of American Football from 1991 to 1992. He served as the head coach for the AFL's Cincinnati Rockers in 1993. Haering then spent three years as a coach for the Atlanta Falcons; he was the team's linebackers coach in 1994, the defensive coordinator in 1995, and the linebackers coach again in 1996.

Haering was a college scout for the Buffalo Bills from 1997 to 2008. He served as the linebackers coach at SMU from 2009 to 2012.

== Personal life ==
Haering's brother, Chuck Haering, was an assistant coach under Joe with the Pittsburgh Gladiators and Cincinnati Rockers. Chuck also coached several sports at the collegiate level. Joe was inducted into the Western Chapter of the Pennsylvania Sports Hall of Fame in 2010. As of 2017, he was retired and living in Atlanta. He died in early 2022.

== AFL head coaching record ==
Team	Year	Regular season				Postseason			
Team	Year	Won	Lost	Win %	Finish	Won	Lost	Win %	Result
PIT	1987	4	2	.667	1st in AFL	0	1	.000	Lost to Denver Dynamite in ArenaBowl I
PIT	1988	6	6	.500	3rd in AFL	0	1	.000	Lost to Detroit Drive in Semifinals
PIT	1989	2	0	1.000	2nd in AFL	0	0	.000	Suspended
PIT	1990	3	5	.375	4th in AFL	0	1	.000	Lost to Detroit Drive in Semifinals
PIT total		15	13	.536	–	0	3	.000	
CIN	1993	2	10	.167	5th in American Conference	0	0	.000	–
Total		17	23	.425		0	3	.000	
