= Yepi Pauu =

Tongan American football player (born 1965)

No. 57
- Positions: Linebacker, running back

Personal information
- Born: April 28, 1965 (age 61); Tonga
- Listed height: 6 ft 0 in (1.83 m)
- Listed weight: 220 lb (100 kg)

Career information
- High school: Santa Ana (Santa Ana, California, U.S.)
- College: Saddleback (1984–1985); San Jose State (1986–1987)
- NFL draft: 1988: undrafted

Career history
- Los Angeles Cobras (1988); Detroit Drive (1990); Frankfurt Galaxy (1991–1992)

Awards and highlights
- ArenaBowl champion (1990); First-team All-PCAA (1987); Second-team All-PCAA (1986); First-team All-Mission Conference (1985); Second-team All-Mission Conference (1984)
- Stats at ArenaFan.com

Yepi Pauu (YEP-pee-PAH-oo-oo; born April 28, 1965), nicknamed the Tongan Hitman, is a Tongan former professional American football player who played in the Arena Football League (AFL) and World League of American Football (WLAF). He played college football for the Saddleback Gauchos and San Jose State Spartans as a linebacker, earning all-conference honors all four seasons of his college career. He played in the AFL for the Los Angeles Cobras in 1988 and the Detroit Drive in 1990, winning ArenaBowl IV with Detroit. He finished his pro football career by playing for the WLAF's Frankfurt Galaxy from 1991 to 1992, and was the team's leading tackler during the former season.

== Early life ==
Yepi Pauu was born on April 28, 1965, in Tonga. Pauu and his family moved to Santa Ana, California, in 1977. He did not play American football until his junior year at Santa Ana High School in 1982. Santa Ana High's football coach had seen Pauu play rugby and invited him to join Santa Ana's high school football team as a linebacker. Pauu was named All-Century League for the 1982 season. As a senior in 1983, he earned All-California Interscholastic Federation and All-County honors while helping Santa Ana win the league title. He also played in the Orange County all-star game. Pauu was later inducted into the Santa Ana High School Athletics Hall of Fame in 2019.

== College career ==
Due to poor grades, Pauu first enrolled at Rancho Santiago College. He then transferred to Saddleback College, where he played two years of college football from 1984 to 1985. The Los Angeles Times reported that since Pauu was so much bigger than other players at Saddleback, he did not go to practice often his freshman year and instead went to the beach or played pickup rugby. After a talk with his coaches, he started practicing more in October 1984 and his performance improved. He ended up being named second-team All-Mission Conference for the 1984 season. Pauu garnered first-team All-Mission Conference honors as a sophomore in 1985 as Saddleback finished the year 11–0 and were named co-national champions with Snow College. Pauu was later inducted into the Saddleback College Athletics Hall of Fame.

In 1986, Pauu signed a national letter of intent to play for the SMU Mustangs. However, SMU later rescinded the offer since they only had seven scholarships to offer due to being on NCAA probation. The letter of intent was also not binding since it had no guardian's signature due to Pauu's mother having been in Tonga at the time. After hearing that Pauu was available, San Jose State Spartans outside linebackers coach Dan Henson drove from San Diego to Los Angeles "in probably less than an hour" in order to sign Pauu. As Henson was leaving after having signed Pauu at 11:30 PM, a coach from Hawaii was just arriving. Pauu was a two-year letterman for the Spartans from 1986 to 1987. He posted 21 tackles and three sacks through the first two games of the 1986 season but his playing time decreased thereafter due to a sprained ankle. He recorded a team-high eight tackles and two sacks in the 1986 California Bowl victory. He had 53 tackles and ten sacks overall during the 1986 season, earning second-team All-Pacific Coast Athletic Association (PCAA) honors. He posted 108 tackles and six sacks as a senior in 1987, garnering first-team All-PCAA and Associated Press honorable mention All-American honors. He acquired the nickname the "Tongan Hitman" while at San Jose State. Pauu majored in criminal justice.

== Professional career ==
After going unselected in the 1988 NFL draft, Pauu signed with the Los Angeles Cobras of the Arena Football League (AFL) as a linebacker/running back. He played both offense and defense in the AFL as the league played under ironman rules. After the second game of the AFL's second season in 1988, Gene Wojciechowski of the Los Angeles Times jokingly stated that Pauu was "the greatest Tongan ever to play arena football." Pauu played in all 12 games for the Cobras in 1988, rushing 43 times for 98 yards and four touchdowns and catching three passes for 16 yards on offense. On defense, he totaled 21 solo tackles, five assisted tackles, six sacks, and three pass breakups. He also returned two kicks for 22 yards. The Cobras finished the year with a 5–6–1 record and lost in the first round of the playoffs to the Chicago Bruisers.

Pauu did not play pro football in 1989. He played in three games for the AFL's Detroit Drive in 1990, totaling 13 carries for 42 yards and one touchdown, one solo tackle, two assisted tackles, one sack, and one blocked kick. On August 11, 1990, the Drive won ArenaBowl IV against the Dallas Texans by a score of 51–27.

Pauu played in all ten games, starting nine, for the Frankfurt Galaxy of the World League of American Football (WLAF) during the league's first season in 1991. He finished the year with totals of 55 tackles, 2.5 sacks, two forced fumbles, and one pass breakup. His 55 tackles were the most on the team. The Galaxy's 7–3 record was the third best in the league but they did not make the playoffs as they finished third in the European Division. In 1992, Pauu made two sacks and one interception for Frankfurt as the team went 3–7.

== Personal life ==
Pauu's son, Butch Pau'u, played linebacker for the BYU Cougars from 2015 to 2018.
