= 1990 Pittsburgh Gladiators season =

Arena Football League team season

- Owner: Bob Gries
- Head coach: Joe Haering
- Home stadium: Civic Arena

Results
- Record: 3–5
- League place: 4th
- Playoffs: Lost semi-finals (Drive) 30–61

The 1990 Pittsburgh Gladiators season was the fourth season for the Arena Football League franchise, and its final season in Pittsburgh. The following year, the franchise moved south to Florida and became the Tampa Bay Storm.

== Regular season ==
=== Schedule ===
| Week | Date | Opponent | Results | | Game site |
| Week | Date | Opponent | Final score | Team record | Game site |
|---|---|---|---|---|---|
| 1 | June 8 | Detroit Drive | L 35–43 | 0–1 | Civic Arena |
| 2 | June 16 | Dallas Texans | L 35–40 | 0–2 | Reunion Arena |
| 3 | June 22 | Washington Commandos | W 55–32 | 1–2 | Civic Arena |
| 4 | June 29 | Denver Dynamite | L 45–47 | 1–3 | Civic Arena |
| 5 | July 6 | at Denver Dynamite | W 29–38 | 1–4 | McNichols Sports Arena |
| 6 | July 14 | Albany Firebirds | W 27–24 | 2–4 | Civic Arena |
| 7 | July 21 | at Washington Commandos | W 30–23 (OT) | 3–4 | Patriot Center |
| 8 | July 27 | at Detroit Drive | L 33–40 | 3–5 | Joe Louis Arena |

=== Standings ===
1990 Arena Football League standings
| Team | W | L | T | PCT | PF | PA | PF (Avg.) | PA (Avg.) | STK |
|---|---|---|---|---|---|---|---|---|---|
| xy-Detroit Drive | 6 | 2 | 0 | .750 | 326 | 215 | 40.7 | 26.9 | W 2 |
| x-Dallas Texans | 6 | 2 | 0 | .750 | 299 | 308 | 37.4 | 38.5 | W 4 |
| x-Denver Dynamite | 4 | 4 | 0 | .500 | 283 | 267 | 35.4 | 33.4 | L 3 |
| x-Pittsburgh Gladiators | 3 | 5 | 0 | .375 | 289 | 287 | 36.1 | 35.9 | L 1 |
| Albany Firebirds | 3 | 5 | 0 | .375 | 188 | 268 | 23.5 | 33.5 | W 1 |
| Washington Commandos | 2 | 6 | 0 | .250 | 244 | 284 | 30.5 | 35.5 | L 2 |

y – clinched regular-season title

x – clinched playoff spot

== Playoffs ==
| Round | Date | Opponent | Results | | Game site |
| Round | Date | Opponent | Final score | Team record | Game site |
|---|---|---|---|---|---|
| Semi-finals | August 3 | at Detroit Drive | L 30–61 | 0–1 | Joe Louis Arena |

== Roster ==
1990 Pittsburgh Gladiators roster
| Quarterbacks: -- Larry Barretta; 7 Brendan Folmar; -- Joe Micchia; Wide Receivers/Defensive Backs: -- Reggie Berry; -- Brad Calip; -- Pat Dean; -- James Lott; -- Thomas Monroe; -- Cornelius Ross | Running Backs/Linebackers: -- Aric Anderson; -- Fabray Collins; -- David Smith; Offensive Linemen/Defensive Linemen: -- Keith Browner; -- Karl Cole; -- Cecil Fletcher; -- Rodney Garner; -- Tom Gizzi; -- Ernest Hodge; -- Donald Thompson | Wide Receivers/Linebackers: -- Domingo Bryant; 46 Julius Dawkins; -- Billy Osborn; -- Fred Smalls; Kickers: 3 Rusty Fricke; Rookies in italics Roster updated March 14, 2013; 23 Active, 0 Inactive, 0 PS → More rosters |

== Awards ==
| Position | Player | Award | All-Arena team |
|---|---|---|---|
| Wide Receiver/Defensive Back | Thomas Monroe | Ironman of the Year | 1st |
| Wide Receiver/Defensive Back | Julius Dawkins | none | 2nd |
| Offensive/Defensive Lineman | Keith Browner | none | 2nd |
