= Arena Football League Most Valuable Player =

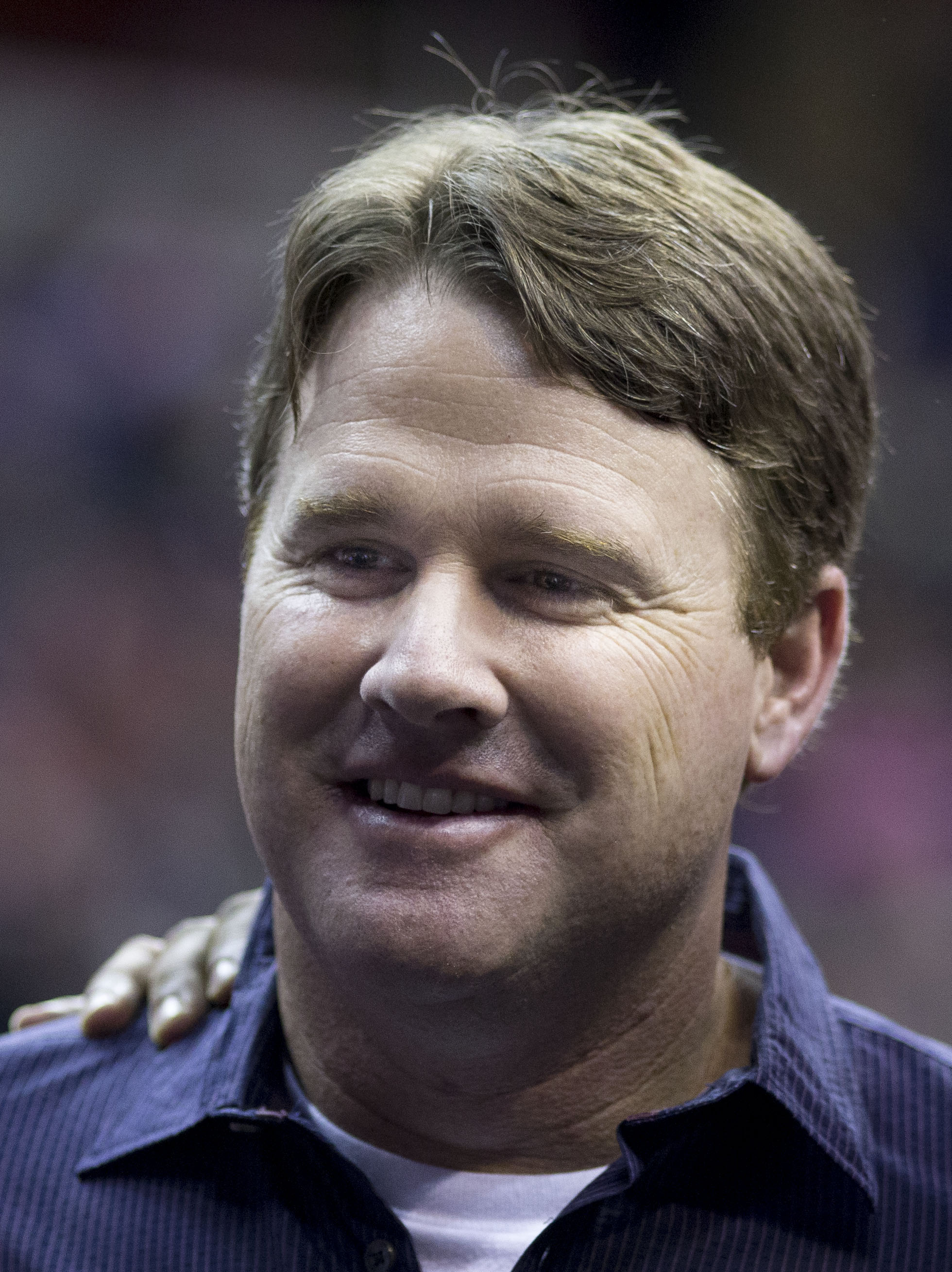
Jay Gruden, 1992 AFL MVP

The Arena Football League Most Valuable Player (AFL MVP) was an award given by the Arena Football League (AFL) to the arena football player who is considered most valuable to his team in the AFL. From 1996 to 2010, the League did not award an MVP.

Season	Player	Team	Position
1987	Russell Hairston	Pittsburgh Gladiators	WR/LB
1988	Ben Bennett	Chicago Bruisers	QB
1989	George LaFrance	Detroit Drive	WR/DB
1990	Art Schlichter	Detroit Drive	QB
1991	George LaFrance (2)	Detroit Drive	WR/DB
1992	Jay Gruden	Tampa Bay Storm	QB
1993	Hunkie Cooper	Arizona Rattlers	WR/LB
1994	Eddie Brown	Albany Firebirds	WR/DB
1995	Barry Wagner	Orlando Predators	WR/DB
2011	Nick Davila	Arizona Rattlers	QB
2012	Tommy Grady	Utah Blaze	QB
2013	Erik Meyer	Spokane Shock	QB
2014	Nick Davila (2)	Arizona Rattlers	QB
2015	Dan Raudabaugh	Philadelphia Soul	QB
2016	Nick Davila (3)	Arizona Rattlers	QB
2017	Randy Hippeard	Tampa Bay Storm	QB
2018	Tommy Grady (2)	Albany Empire	QB
2019	Tommy Grady (3)	Albany Empire	QB
