= AFL on FSN =

The Arena Football League had a regional-cable deal with Fox Sports Net (beginning in 2004), where FSN regional affiliates in AFL markets carried local team games. In some areas Fox Sports affiliates still carry the games.

== Terms of the deal ==
The Fox Sports Networks agreement had some of the revenue-sharing aspects in common with the two-year deal that the AFL had with NBC. FSN, like NBC, didn't pay rights fees to carry the games. The network instead, split ad revenue with the AFL; NBC split ad revenue 50–50 with the league, and the Fox deal was similar but apparently not 50-50. The agreement calls for FSN to produce the game telecasts, and both the AFL and FSN will work together to sell advertising inventory. Once FSN reimbursed for its production costs, the two organizations would share ad revenue. The agreement, combined with individual team broadcasting agreements, increased the number of AFL non-NBC games on television from 39 in 2004 to more than 120 in 2005. Most FSN regional telecasts took place on Fridays and Saturdays, and were in addition to the AFL's exclusive Sunday afternoon national window on NBC.

FSN would carry more than 100 telecasts in 2004, including eight games on Fox–owned Sunshine Network (now Sun Sports), with 15 of the 17 teams appearing a minimum of five times. All 17 teams would have at least two games televised through this agreement.

In addition, FSN would continue producing and televising AFL WEEKLY, a weekly magazine program that premiered on the network in the previous season.

== Affiliates ==
The AFL had 17 teams in markets from coast to coast, with 16 of them located in markets serviced by a Fox or Rainbow-owned regional sports network, making the AFL a natural local programming addition. In addition to the aforementioned Sunshine (the FSN broadcast affiliate of the Orlando Predators and Tampa Bay Storm), the other FSN-owned regional affiliates boasting local AFL teams and scheduled to carry games were FSN Arizona (Arizona Rattlers), FSN Detroit (Grand Rapids Rampage), FSN Rocky Mountain (Colorado Crush), FSN South (Georgia Force and Nashville Kats), FSN Southwest (Austin Wranglers, Dallas Desperados and New Orleans VooDoo) and FSN West (Las Vegas Gladiators and Los Angeles Avengers). Meanwhile, the Rainbow-owned FSN affiliates were FSN Bay Area (now Comcast SportsNet Bay Area) (San Jose SaberCats), the now defunct FSN Chicago (Chicago Rush), FSN New York (now MSG Plus) (New York Dragons) and FSN Ohio (Columbus Destroyers). Each region had its own broadcast team, with the home market's FSN network responsible for a single production which in return, would be fed to the visiting team's local FSN network.

=== Chicago ===
The Chicago Rush originally had games broadcast on the now defunct Fox Sports Net Chicago during its first two seasons from 2001 to 2002 with mostly Saturday night telecasts. When the AFL signed with NBC from 2003 to 2006, the Rush was one of the most prominently featured teams during the national NBC broadcasts as well as playoff games and the majority of Chicago's games moved to Sunday afternoons. A few of the games not picked up by NBC remained on FSN Chicago until 2006. Beginning in the 2007 season, the AFL began a TV partnership with ESPN and FSN Chicago went under and Comcast SportsNet Chicago took its place. Once again the Rush were widely featured during the national ESPN telecasts on Monday nights and Sunday afternoons.

The regional telecasts went to Comcast SportsNet. From 2001 to 2008, the Rush games were broadcast by Tom Dore and former Chicago Bears offensive lineman James "Big Cat" Williams. The radio deals bounced between 670 The Score and ESPN Radio 1000.

When the Rush returned in 2010, the AFL signed its TV deal with NFL Network, but the Rush were not featured as often as they had been with ESPN and NBC, averaging between 2 and 3 telecasts a year on NFL Network in 2010 and 2011, but were shutout from the national spotlight in 2012. Occasionally region games air on CSN and WGN's CLTV, and all AFL games are streamed for free online through UStream.

== Prime Network's coverage ==
The Prime Network, the forerunner to the Fox Sports Networks (officially starting on November 1, 1996, when the Prime Network names were dropped for the FSN name nationwide) broadcast the ArenaBowl from 1989–1991. Dave Enet and Bill Land served as play-by-play men and Howard Balzer and Tony Hill served as color commentators. Jim Grabowski served as a sideline reporter for ArenaBowl IV in 1990.
