= Sam Moore (gridiron football) =

American gridiron football player (born 1962)

No. 74
- Position: Wide receiver

Personal information
- Born: September 4, 1962 (age 64)
- Listed height: 6 ft 2 in (1.88 m)
- Listed weight: 200 lb (91 kg)

Career information
- College: Sam Houston State (1981–1984)
- NFL draft: 1985: undrafted

Career history
- Los Angeles Rams (1985); BC Lions (1986)*; Ottawa Rough Riders (1987)*; Houston Oilers (1987); BC Lions (1988); Dallas Texans (1990–1993); Las Vegas Sting (1994)
- * Offseason or practice squad member only

Awards and highlights
- First-team All-Arena (1991); AFL All-Star (1993)

Career AFL statistics
- Receptions: 150
- Receiving yards: 1,843
- Receiving TDs: 34
- Tackles: 90
- Interceptions: 11
- Stats at ArenaFan.com

Sam Moore (born September 4, 1962) is an American former professional football wide receiver who played four seasons in the Arena Football League (AFL) with the Dallas Texans and Las Vegas Sting. He played college football at Sam Houston State University. He also played for the BC Lions of the Canadian Football League (CFL).

== Early life ==
Sam Moore was born on September 4, 1962. He was a four-year letterman for the Sam Houston State Bearkats of Sam Houston State University from 1981 to 1984.

== Professional career ==
Moore signed with the Los Angeles Rams after going undrafted in the 1985 NFL draft. He was placed on injured reserve on August 16, 1985, and spent the entire season there. On August 9, 1986, it was reported that he had been released.

Moore was signed to a trial by the BC Lions during the 1986 CFL season but did not appear in any games for the team. He re-signed with the Lions on January 29, 1987. He was released on June 5, 1987.

Moore signed with the Ottawa Rough Riders of the CFL on June 11, 1987. He was released on June 19, 1987.

Moore signed with the Houston Oilers during the 1987 NFL players strike. When the Oilers were compiling biographical information on Moore and the rest of their replacement players, they called Sam Houston State, who informed the Oilers that Moore had died three years earlier. Oilers head coach Jerry Glanville was noted as saying "They say he's dead. After watching him run pass patterns, I think it's true." Sam Houston State later called back and stated that the college had confused Moore with a different Sam Moore who had attended the school. Moore did not play in any games during his time with the Oilers and was released on October 19, 1987, after the strike ended.

Moore was signed by the BC Lions again in February 1988. He dressed in four games for the Lions during the 1988 season, catching eight passes for 172 yards and one touchdown. He was released in mid August 1988.

Moore played in all eight games for the Dallas Texans of the Arena Football League (AFL) in 1990, totaling 33 receptions for 446 yards and five touchdowns, 18 solo tackles, eight assisted tackles, one fumble recovery, one pass breakup, one blocked kick, and five interceptions for 59 yards and two touchdowns. He was a wide receiver/linebacker during his time in the AFL as the league played under ironman rules. The Texans finished the 1990 season with a 6–2 record and advanced to ArenaBowl IV, where they lost to the Detroit Drive by a score of 51–27. Moore appeared in all ten games in 1991, recording 60 catches for 708 yards and 14 touchdowns, 23 solo tackles, six assisted tackles, two sacks, two fumble recoveries, two pass breakups, three blocked kicks, five interceptions for 83 yards, and seven kick returns for 141 yards as the Texans finished 4–6. He earned first-team All-Arena honors for his performance during the 1991 season. He did not appear in any games in 1992. Moore played in all 12 games during the 1993 season, accumulating 47 receptions for 625 yards and 14 touchdowns, 30 solo tackles, three assisted tackles, two fumble recoveries, four pass breakups, and one interception for ten yards and one touchdown. The Texans finished 3–9 and lost in the first round of the playoffs to the Detroit Drive 51–6. Moore was named to the 1993 AFL All-Star game.

Moore joined the expansion Las Vegas Sting of the AFL in 1994. He appeared in three games during the 1994 season, recording 10 receptions for 64 yards and one touchdown, eight solo tackles, five assisted tackles, one forced fumble, one pass breakup, and one blocked kick.
