= Thomas Monroe (American football) =

American football wide receiver and defensive back (born 1966)

No. 29, 26
- Position: Wide receiver / Defensive back

Personal information
- Born: April 23, 1966 (age 60)
- Listed height: 5 ft 11 in (1.80 m)
- Listed weight: 185 lb (84 kg)

Career information
- College: Prairie View A&M
- NFL draft: 1989: undrafted

Career history
- Pittsburgh Gladiators/Tampa Bay Storm (1989–1990); Toronto Argonauts (1991)*; Tampa Bay Storm (1991); Cincinnati Rockers (1992)*; New Orleans Night (1992)
- * Offseason or practice squad member only

Awards and highlights
- ArenaBowl champion (1991); First-team All-Arena (1990); AFL Ironman of the Year (1990)

Career AFL statistics
- Receptions: 82
- Receiving yards: 978
- Tackles: 41
- Interceptions: 2
- Total TDs: 15
- Stats at ArenaFan.com

Thomas Monroe (born April 23, 1966) is an American former professional football player who played four seasons in the Arena Football League (AFL) with the Pittsburgh Gladiators/Tampa Bay Storm and New Orleans Night. He played college football at Prairie View A&M University. In 1990, he was the AFL Ironman of the Year and also named first-team All-Arena.

== Early life ==
Thomas Monroe was born on April 23, 1966. He played college football for the Prairie View A&M Panthers of Prairie View A&M University. He led the Southwestern Athletic Conference in receiving as a senior in 1988.

== Professional career ==
Monroe played in all four games for the Pittsburgh Gladiators of the Arena Football League (AFL) in 1989, recording 24 receptions for 332 yards and five touchdowns, three kick returns for 24 yards, three solo tackles, and two assisted tackles. He was a wide receiver/defensive back during his time in the AFL as the league played under ironman rules. The Gladiators finished the 1989 season with a 3–1 record and advanced to ArenaBowl III, where they lost to the Detroit Drive by a score of 39–26. Monroe appeared in all eight games for Pittsburgh in 1990, totaling 44 catches for 508 yards and seven touchdowns, 20 solo tackles, ten assisted tackles, one interception, three pass breakups, three forced fumbles, 41 kick returns for 552 yards, and two carries for six yards and one touchdown. He earned first-team All-Arena and AFL Ironman of the Year honors for his performance during the 1990 season. The Gladiators moved to Tampa Bay, Florida in 1991, becoming the Tampa Bay Storm.

Monroe signed with the Toronto Argonauts of the Canadian Football League in May 1991. He played in two preseason games for Toronto as a receiver but was placed on the team's practice roster after two receivers returned from injury. Monroe then requested to be released from his contract, later signing with the Storm on July 10, 1991. In regards to requesting his release, Monroe stated "I'd rather be playing here than sitting around up there." Monroe played in four games for the Storm during the 1991 season, catching five passes for 54 yards and one touchdown while also posting eight solo tackles, one forced fumble, one fumble recovery, one pass breakup, and one interception that he returned 44 yards for a touchdown. On August 17, 1991, the Storm won ArenaBowl V against the Drive by a margin of 48–42.

Monroe was selected by the AFL's Cincinnati Rockers in an expansion draft. However, in May 1992, before the start of the 1992 season, he was traded to the New Orleans Night for future considerations. He played in seven games for the Night in 1992, recording nine receptions for 84 yards, ten solo tackles, five assisted tackles, one pass breakup, one fumble recovery, and two kick returns for six yards.
