= 1990 Washington Commandos season =

Arena Football League team season

- Head coach: Mike Hohensee
- Home stadium: Patriot Center

Results
- Record: 2–6
- Division place: 6th
- Playoffs: Did not qualify

The 1990 Washington Commandos season was the third and final season for the Commandos. The team returned to the Washington name for their final season in 1990. They were coached by Hohensee, who had been promoted from his assistant position. The Commandos started the season 0–3. They finished with a record of 2–6.

== Regular season ==
=== Schedule ===
Week	Date	Opponent	Results		Game site
Week	Date	Opponent	Final score	Team record	Game site
1	June 9	at Albany Firebirds	L 12–16	0–1	Knickerbocker Arena
2	June 16	Detroit Drive	L 28–52	0–2	Patriot Center
3	June 22	at Pittsburgh Gladiators	L 32–55	0–3	Civic Arena
4	June 30	Albany Firebirds	W 50–19	1–3	Patriot Center
5	July 7	Dallas Texans	L 38–49	1–4	Patriot Center
6	July 13	at Denver Dynamite	W 33–26	2–4	McNichols Sports Arena
7	July 21	Pittsburgh Gladiators	L 23–30	2–5	Patriot Center
8	July 28	at Dallas Texans	L 28–37	2–6	Reunion Arena

=== Standings ===
1990 Arena Football League standings
Team	W	L	T	PCT	PF	PA	PF (Avg.)	PA (Avg.)	STK
xy-Detroit Drive	6	2	0	.750	326	215	40.7	26.9	W 2
x-Dallas Texans	6	2	0	.750	299	308	37.4	38.5	W 4
x-Denver Dynamite	4	4	0	.500	283	267	35.4	33.4	L 3
x-Pittsburgh Gladiators	3	5	0	.375	289	287	36.1	35.9	L 1
Albany Firebirds	3	5	0	.375	188	268	23.5	33.5	W 1
Washington Commandos	2	6	0	.250	244	284	30.5	35.5	L 2

y – clinched regular-season title

x – clinched playoff spot

== Roster ==
1990 Washington Commandos roster
Quarterbacks: -- Tony Burris; -- Mike Rhodes; Wide Receivers/Defensive Backs: 44 Chris Armstrong; -- Charlie Brown; -- Derrick Donald; -- Russell Hairston; 29 Ray Puryear; -- Jim Rafferty; -- Rob Sterling	Running Backs/Linebackers: 84 Jeff Blankenship; -- Mickey Paige; -- John Rymiszewski; -- Fred Smalls; Offensive Linemen/Defensive Linemen: -- Patrick Cain; -- Matt Conerly; -- Anthony Corvino; 82 Rod Ferguson; 55 Jeff Garneca; 62 Chuck Harris; -- Bill Leach; -- Andrew Marlatt; -- Rodney Smith	Wide Receivers/Linebackers: -- Dan Burmeister; -- Alvin Blount; 20 Wade Lockett; Kickers: -- Dan Plocki; Rookies in italics Roster updated March 13, 2013; 26 Active, 0 Inactive, 0 PS → More rosters

== All-Arena team members ==
Position	Player	All-Arena team
Wide Receiver/Defensive Back	Chris Armstrong	2nd
Offensive/Defensive Lineman	Chuck Harris	2nd
