= Chris Parker (quarterback) =

American football player (born 1964)

Profile
- Position: Quarterback

Personal information
- Born: December 19, 1964 (age 61)
- Listed height: 6 ft 0 in (1.83 m)
- Listed weight: 190 lb (86 kg)

Career information
- High school: Aquinas (San Bernardino, California)
- College: Cal State Northridge
- NFL draft: 1987: undrafted

Career history
- London Capitals (1988); Los Angeles Rams (1989)*; Denver Dynamite (1990); Sacramento Attack (1992)
- * Offseason or practice squad member only

Career AFL statistics
- Comp. / Att.: 60 / 112
- Passing yards: 738
- TD–INT: 11–5
- QB rating: 80.13
- Rushing TDs: 1
- Stats at ArenaFan.com

Chris Parker (born December 19, 1964) is an American former professional football quarterback who was a member of the Los Angeles Rams. Parker played for the London Capitals in the premier division of the BAFA National Leagues. He also played two seasons in the Arena Football League (AFL) with the Denver Dynamite and Sacramento Attack. He played college football at Saddleback College, San Bernardino Valley College, and California State University, Northridge.

== Early life ==
Parker played high school football at Aquinas High School in San Bernardino, California. He saw time mostly as a defensive back.

== College career ==
Parker first played college football for the Saddleback Gauchos of Saddleback College as a free safety and quarterback. He transferred to play for the San Bernardino Valley College Indians where he was the starting quarterback.

He played for the Cal State Northridge Matadors from 1985 to 1986. Parker completed 232 of 424 passes for 2,658 yards and 19 touchdowns in 1985. The attempts and completions, along with the 2,773 yards in total offense he generated, were school records. As a punter, he averaged 40.6 yards and one of his 48 punts traveled 72 yards in 1985. In 1986, Parker complete 81 of 158 pass attempts for 1,167 yards and a twelve touchdowns. He also punted 44 times for 1,763 yards for a 40.1 average. The Matadors' record improved from 4–7 to 8–3 and the team came within one minute in their final conference game of claiming the Western Football Conference title in 1986.

== Professional career ==
Parker played for the London Capitals of the BAFA National Leagues and the European Football League tournament in 1988 after being out of football in 1987. He helped the club to the semifinals of the BritBowl Premier Division postseason playoffs. He was a member of the Los Angeles Rams of the National Football League during the 1989 off-season. Parker played for the Denver Dynamite of the AFL in 1990. He signed with the AFL's Los Angeles Wings in April 1992. The team moved to Sacramento to become the Sacramento Attack before the start of the season. His playing career ended in 1992 because of a severe knee injury. Parker tore all the ligaments and cartilage in his left knee after being sacked in a game playing for the Attack.

=== AFL statistics ===
Year	Team	Passing							Rushing		
Year	Team	Cmp	Att	Pct	Yds	TD	Int	Rtg	Att	Yds	TD
1990	Denver	17	33	51.5	225	3	3	58.27	2	16	1
1992	Sacramento	43	79	54.4	513	8	2	89.27	6	26	0
Career		60	112	53.6	738	11	5	80.13	8	42	1
