= Mitch Young =

American gridiron football player (born 1961)

No. 71, 75
- Position: Defensive end

Personal information
- Born: July 18, 1961 (age 65); Coldwater, Mississippi, U.S.
- Listed height: 6 ft 4 in (1.93 m)
- Listed weight: 260 lb (118 kg)

Career information
- High school: North Panola (Sardis, Mississippi)
- College: Arkansas State

Career history
- Toronto Argonauts (1986)*; Denver Broncos (1987); Atlanta Falcons (1987–1988); Ottawa Rough Riders (1989); Denver Dynamite (1990–1991); Sacramento Attack (1992)
- * Offseason or practice squad member only

Awards and highlights
- Second-team All-Arena (1990)
- Stats at Pro Football Reference
- Stats at ArenaFan.com

Mitchell Young (born July 18, 1961) is an American former professional football defensive end who played one season with the Atlanta Falcons of the National Football League (NFL). He played college football at Northwest Mississippi Community College and Arkansas State University. He also played in the Canadian Football League (CFL) and Arena Football League (AFL).

== Early life and college ==
Mitchell Young was born on July 18, 1961, in Coldwater, Mississippi. He attended North Panola High School in Sardis, Mississippi.

Young first played college football at Northwest Mississippi Community College from 1981 to 1982. He then transferred to Arkansas State University, where he was a two-year letterman for the Arkansas State Red Wolves from 1983 to 1984.

== Professional career ==
Young signed with the Toronto Argonauts of the Canadian Football League (CFL) in 1986. He was released on June 5, 1986.

On September 23, 1987, Young signed with the Denver Broncos during the 1987 NFL players strike. However, he was released before appearing in any games.

On October 13, 1987, Young was signed by the Atlanta Falcons during the strike. He played in one game for the Falcons before being released on October 19, 1987. He signed with the Falcons again on February 21, 1988. Young was placed on injured reserve on August 23, 1988, and missed the entire 1988 season. He was released by the Falcons on August 28, 1989.

Young signed with the Ottawa Rough Riders of the CFL in 1989. He dressed in two games during the 1989 season, posting four tackles, before being released on October 29, 1989.

Young played in all eight games for the Denver Dynamite of the Arena Football League (AFL) in 1990, recording four solo tackles, four assisted tackles, 2.5 sacks, one forced fumble, and one pass breakup. He was an offensive lineman/defensive lineman during his time in the AFL as the league played under ironman rules. The Dynamite finished the season with a 4–4 record and lost in the first round of the playoffs to the Dallas Texans. Young was named second-team All-Arena for his performance during the 1990 season. He appeared in three games for Denver in 1991, totaling two solo tackles and one fumble recovery.

Young played in all ten games for the Sacramento Attack of the AFL in 1992, recording eight solo tackles, one assisted tackle, 3.5 sacks, and one pass breakup.
