= Mitchell Ward =

American football player

Profile
- Positions: Fullback, linebacker

Personal information
- Listed height: 5 ft 11 in (1.80 m)
- Listed weight: 240 lb (109 kg)

Career information
- High school: Lockhart (Lockhart, Texas)
- College: Southwest Texas State

Career history
- Dallas Texans (1990–1991); Charlotte Rage (1992)

Awards and highlights
- First-team All-Arena (1990)

Career AFL statistics
- Rushes: 82
- Rushing yards: 272
- Rushing TDs: 7
- Tackles: 50.5
- Sacks: 2
- Stats at ArenaFan.com

Mitchell Ward is an American former professional football player who played three seasons in the Arena Football League (AFL) with the Dallas Texans and Charlotte Rage. He played college football at Southwest Texas State University.

== Early life and college ==
Ward is originally from Saint Johns Colony, Texas but grew up in Lockhart, Texas. He attended Lockhart High School and graduated in 1984.

Ward played college football for the Southwest Texas State Bobcats of Southwest Texas State University, lettering in 1988. He graduated in 1989. In 2022, the Texas State University Alumni Association honored Ward with its Distinguished Alumni Award.

== Professional career ==
Ward played in all eight games for the Dallas Texans of the Arena Football League (AFL) in 1990, totaling 25 solo tackles, four assisted tackles, two sacks, one forced fumble, one fumble recovery, one pass breakup, one interception for 19 yards and one touchdown, 57 carries for 185 yards and seven touchdowns, and one reception for 19 yards. He was a fullback/linebacker during his time in the AFL as the league played under ironman rules. The Texans finished the 1990 season with a 6–2 record and advanced to ArenaBowl IV, where they lost to the Detroit Drive. Ward was named first-team All-Arena for his performance during the 1990 season. He appeared in seven games for Dallas in 1991, recording 17 solo tackles, 13 assisted tackles, two fumble recoveries, one blocked kick, 22 carries for 72 yards, and five catches for 45 yards.

Ward played in one game for the Charlotte Rage of the AFL during the 1992 season, rushing three times for 15 yards while also breaking up one pass.

== Personal life ==
Ward is the chairman and CEO of MW Logistics in Dallas, Texas. He founded the company in 2001. Ward has been noted for organizing many food drives in the Texas area. He is also a major donor to Texas State University.

His son, Preston Ward, plays college football at Texas State.
