= 1990 Albany Firebirds season =

Arena Football League team season

- Head coach: Rick Buffington
- Home stadium: Knickerbocker Arena

Results
- Record: 3–5
- Division place: 5th
- Playoffs: Did not qualify

The 1990 Albany Firebirds season was the first season for the Firebirds. They finished 3–5.

== Regular season ==
=== Schedule ===
Week	Date	Opponent	Results		Game site
Week	Date	Opponent	Final score	Team record	Game site
1	June 9	Washington Commandos	W 16–12	1–0	Knickerbocker Arena
2	June 14	at Denver Dynamite	L 20–38	1–1	McNichols Sports Arena
3	June 23	Dallas Texans	W 46–34	2–1	Knickerbocker Arena
4	June 30	at Washington Commandos	L 14–53	2–2	Patriot Center
5	July 6	Detroit Drive	L 21–50	2–3	Knickerbocker Arena
6	July 14	at Pittsburgh Gladiators	L 24–27	2–4	Civic Arena
7	July 20	at Detroit Drive	L 16–37	2–5	Joe Louis Arena
8	July 28	Denver Dynamite	W 26–20	3–5	Knickerbocker Arena

=== Standings ===
1990 Arena Football League standings
Team	W	L	T	PCT	PF	PA	PF (Avg.)	PA (Avg.)	STK
xy-Detroit Drive	6	2	0	.750	326	215	40.7	26.9	W 2
x-Dallas Texans	6	2	0	.750	299	308	37.4	38.5	W 4
x-Denver Dynamite	4	4	0	.500	283	267	35.4	33.4	L 3
x-Pittsburgh Gladiators	3	5	0	.375	289	287	36.1	35.9	L 1
Albany Firebirds	3	5	0	.375	188	268	23.5	33.5	W 1
Washington Commandos	2	6	0	.250	244	284	30.5	35.5	L 2

y – clinched regular-season title

x – clinched playoff spot

== Roster ==
1990 Albany Firebirds roster
Quarterbacks: -- Mark Kamphaus; -- Kyle Mackey; -- Harold Smith; Wide Receivers/Defensive Backs: -- Brian Gardner; -- Merv Mosely; -- Durwood Roquemore; -- Reggie Smith; -- Rob Sterling; -- Steve Thonn	Running Backs/Linebackers: -- Johnny Jones; -- Osia Lewis; Offensive Linemen/Defensive Linemen: -- Sylvester Bembery; -- Dwight Bingham; -- Glenn Haisley; -- Terrance Hall; -- Kevin Murphy; -- Jeff Neal; -- Pete Porcelli; -- John Reed; -- Allen Roulette; -- Matt Sala	Wide Receivers/Linebackers: -- Fred Gayles; -- Garland Rivers; Kickers: -- Gary Gussman; Rookies in italics Roster updated March 15, 2013; 24 Active, 0 Inactive, 0 PS → More rosters

== Awards ==
Position	Player	Award	All-Arena team
Offensive Specialist/Kick Returner	Reggie Smith	none	1st
Offensive/Defensive Lineman	Sylvester Bembery	none	1st
Offensive/Defensive Lineman	Kevin Murphy	none	1st
Wide Receiver/Defensive Back	Reggie Smith	none	2nd
Kicker	Gary Gussman	none	2nd
