= 1990 Denver Dynamite season =

Arena Football League team season

- Owner: Gary Graham
- Head coach: Babe Parilli
- Home stadium: McNichols Sports Arena

Results
- Record: 4–4
- Division place: 3rd
- Playoffs: Lost semi-finals (Texans) 25–26

The 1990 Denver Dynamite season was the third season for the Arena Football League franchise. With the same coaching staff in place from 1989, the Dynamite got off to a hot 4–1 start during the 1990 season. The attendance had been steadily rising during the season, with the final home game's attendance listed at 10,587. This included approximately 3,000 people who were admitted for free. The Dynamite would finish the season with a record of 4–4, good enough to clinch the 3rd seed. The team lost 25–26 to the semi-finals to the Dallas Texans.

== Regular season ==
=== Schedule ===
Week	Date	Opponent	Results		Game site
Week	Date	Opponent	Final score	Team record	Game site
1	June 8	at Dallas Texans	L 47–50	0–1	Reunion Arena
2	June 14	Albany Firebirds	W 38–20	1–1	McNichols Sports Arena
3	June 22	at Detroit Drive	W 35–22	2–1	Joe Louis Arena
4	June 29	at Pittsburgh Gladiators	W 47–45	3–1	Civic Arena
5	July 6	Pittsburgh Gladiators	W 38–29	4–1	McNichols Sports Arena
6	July 13	Washington Commandos	L 26–33	4–2	McNichols Sports Arena
7	April 21	Dallas Texans	L 32–42	4–3	McNichols Sports Arena
8	July 28	at Albany Firebirds	L 20–26	4–4	Times Union Center

=== Standings ===
1990 Arena Football League standings
Team	W	L	T	PCT	PF	PA	PF (Avg.)	PA (Avg.)	STK
xy-Detroit Drive	6	2	0	.750	326	215	40.7	26.9	W 2
x-Dallas Texans	6	2	0	.750	299	308	37.4	38.5	W 4
x-Denver Dynamite	4	4	0	.500	283	267	35.4	33.4	L 3
x-Pittsburgh Gladiators	3	5	0	.375	289	287	36.1	35.9	L 1
Albany Firebirds	3	5	0	.375	188	268	23.5	33.5	W 1
Washington Commandos	2	6	0	.250	244	284	30.5	35.5	L 2

== Playoffs ==
Week	Date	Opponent	Results		Game site
Week	Date	Opponent	Final score	Team record	Game site
1	August 4	at Dallas Texans	L 25–26	0–1	Reunion Arena

== Roster ==
1990 Denver Dynamite roster
Quarterbacks: 7 Mike Hold, Jr.; -- Chris Parker; Wide Receivers/Defensive Backs: 32 Frank Bianchini; 27 Wayne Coffey; 88 Fred Dussett; 26 Anthony Knight; 55 Bart Schuchts; 5 Alvin Williams	Running Backs/Linebackers: 20 Willie Cannon; 44 John El-Masry; Offensive Linemen/Defensive Linemen: 62 Mike Freeman; 77 Walter Housman; 65 Quinton Knight; 89 Jon Norris; 82 Keith Smith; 50 Mitch Young	Wide Receivers/Linebackers: 17 Mike Babb; -- Maurice Gravely; Kickers: 3 Tracy Bennett; Rookies in italics Roster updated March 13, 2013; 19 Active, 0 Inactive, 0 PS → More rosters

== Awards ==
Position	Player	Award	All-Arena team
Offensive/Defensive Lineman	Quinton Knight	none	1st
Kicker	Mitch Young	none	2nd
