= Fred Smalls =

American gridiron football player (born 1963)

No. 53
- Positions: Fullback, linebacker

Personal information
- Born: January 17, 1963 (age 63); Beaufort, South Carolina, U.S.
- Listed height: 6 ft 3 in (1.91 m)
- Listed weight: 225 lb (102 kg)

Career information
- High school: Battery Creek (Beaufort)
- College: West Virginia
- NFL draft: 1986: 7th round, 182nd overall pick

Career history
- San Diego Chargers (1986)*; Ottawa Rough Riders (1987); Philadelphia Eagles (1987); Tampa Bay Buccaneers (1988)*; Pittsburgh Gladiators (1990); Washington Commandos (1990); Albany Firebirds (1991); Cologne Crocodiles (1992-1994)
- * Offseason or practice squad member only

Awards and highlights
- All-American (1984); First-team All-East (1985)

Career NFL statistics
- Sacks: 2.5
- Stats at Pro Football Reference

Career AFL statistics
- Total tackles: 27
- Sacks: 2
- Receptions / Yards: 3 / 25
- Rushes / Yards: 12 / 44
- Touchdowns: 1
- Stats at ArenaFan.com

Frederick R. Smalls (born January 7, 1963) is an American former professional football player who was a linebacker in the National Football League (NFL), Arena Football League (AFL), and German Football League (GFL).

Smalls was born and raised in Beaufort, South Carolina and played scholastically at Battery Creek High School.

== College career ==
Smalls enrolled at West Virginia University in 1982. In his freshman season, he recorded six tackles, a fumble recovery. In, 1983 as a sophomore, he recorded 13 tackles and a pass break-up as a backup.

In 1984, as a junior, Smalls earned the starting position. That season, he recorded 87 tackles, two interceptions, a fumble recovery, and two sacks. He was named to the NEA All-America team. As a senior, in 1985, Smalls totaled 97 tackles, five forced fumbles, a fumble recovery, and three sacks. He was also named to the AP All-East team.

== Professional career ==
=== National Football League ===
Smalls was selected in the seventh round, 182nd overall by the San Diego Chargers in the 1986 NFL draft. However, he was cut in August 1986.

In 1987, he joined the Ottawa Rough Riders of the Canadian Football League (CFL). Also in 1987, he played three games for the Philadelphia Eagles in 1987. In 1988, he spent time with the Tampa Bay Buccaneers, during training camp before retiring in July.

=== Arena Football League ===
In 1990, Smalls joined the Pittsburgh Gladiators of the Arena Football League (AFL). He only spent a short part of 1990 with the Gladiators, recording five tackles. He then moved to the Washington Commandos, where he played fullback along with linebacker. He finished the season with 18 tackles and a sack on defense with the Commandos and three receptions for 25 yards and 12 rushes for 44 yards and a touchdown on offense. In 1991, Smalls joined the Albany Firebirds. That season, he recorded four tackles and a sack.

=== German Football League ===
Smalls then played for the Cologne Crocodiles in the German Football League until 1994.
