= Greg Orton (offensive lineman) =

American football player (born 1962)

No. 67
- Position: Offensive guard

Personal information
- Born: August 9, 1962 (age 64); Nebraska City, Nebraska, U.S.
- Listed height: 6 ft 1 in (1.85 m)
- Listed weight: 265 lb (120 kg)

Career information
- High school: Nebraska City
- College: Nebraska (1980–1984)
- NFL draft: 1985: undrafted

Career history
- Detroit Lions (1987); Detroit Drive (1988–1990)

Awards and highlights
- 3× ArenaBowl champion (1988, 1989, 1990); Second-team All-Arena (1990)
- Stats at Pro Football Reference
- Stats at ArenaFan.com

Gregory Jay Orton (born August 9, 1962) is an American former professional football offensive lineman who played one season with the Detroit Lions of the National Football League (NFL). He played college football at the University of Nebraska–Lincoln. Orton was also a member of the Detroit Drive of the Arena Football League (AFL). He was named second-team All-Arena in 1990.

== Early life ==
Gregory Jay Orton was born on August 9, 1962, in Nebraska City, Nebraska. He attended Nebraska City High School in Nebraska City.

== College career ==
Orton turned down offers from Northwest Missouri State and Peru State to instead join the Nebraska Cornhuskers of the University of Nebraska–Lincoln as a walk-on in 1980. He did not earn a scholarship until 1983, and was a two-year letterman from 1983 to 1984. On October 15, 1983, he made his first career start in place of the injured senior offensive tackle John Sherlock; Orton had previously been a member of the scout team as an offensive guard due to an NCAA rule that prevented walk-ons from playing without scholarships. Nebraska was the No. 1 ranked team in the country at the time of Orton's first career start, and he had not played tackle since his senior year of high school. He was a starter at guard for the Cornhuckers in 1984 and earned Omaha World-Herald All-Big Eight honors.

== Professional career ==
On September 23, 1987, Orton, who was an assistant coach at Peru State at the time, signed a contract to play for the Detroit Lions of the National Football League (NFL) during the 1987 NFL players strike. He started all three strike games for the Lions at guard. He was released on October 19, 1987, after the strike ended.

Orton played in ten games for the Detroit Drive of the Arena Football League (AFL) in 1988, recording 11 solo tackles, two assisted tackles, two pass breakups, and two catches for negative one yard and one touchdown. He was an offensive lineman/defensive lineman during his time in the AFL as the league played under ironman rules. The Drive finished the season with a 9–3 record and later advanced to ArenaBowl II, where they beat the Chicago Bruisers by a score of 24–13. Orton appeared in two games during the 1989 season and forced one fumble. The Drive went 3–1 and eventually advanced to ArenaBowl III, where they defeated the Pittsburgh Gladiators 39–26. He played in all eight games in 1990, totaling eight solo tackles, four assisted tackles, four sacks, and two forced fumbles. The Drive finished with a 6–2 record and made it to ArenaBowl IV, defeating the Dallas Texans by a score of 51–27. Orton was named second-team All-Arena for his performance during the 1990 season.

== Personal life ==
Orton's brothers Steve and John both played football at Peru State.
