= AFL Most Valuable Player Award =

AFL MVP may refer to:

- American Football League Most Valuable Player Award
- Arena Football League Most Valuable Player Award
- Leigh Matthews Trophy, MVP of the Australian Football League
