= Ernie Stautner =

American football player and coach

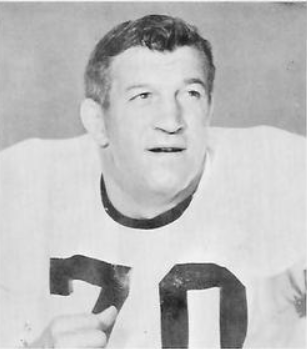
- Stautner, c. 1963

No. 63, 70
- Positions: Defensive tackle, defensive end, guard

Personal information
- Born: April 20, 1925; Prienzing near Cham, Bavaria, Germany
- Died: February 16, 2006 (aged 80); Carbondale, Colorado, U.S.
- Listed height: 6 ft 1 in (1.85 m)
- Listed weight: 230 lb (104 kg)

Career information
- High school: Vincentian Institute (Albany, New York, U.S.); Columbia (East Greenbush, New York)
- College: Boston College
- NFL draft: 1950: 2nd round, 22nd overall pick

Career history

Playing
- Pittsburgh Steelers (1950–1963)

Coaching
- Pittsburgh Steelers (1963–1964) Defensive line; Washington Redskins (1965) Defensive line; Dallas Cowboys (1966–1988) Defensive coordinator/defensive line; Dallas Texans (1990) Head coach; Denver Broncos (1991–1994) Defensive line; Frankfurt Galaxy (1995–1997) Head coach

Awards and highlights
- 2× Super Bowl champion (VI, XII); 4× First-team All-Pro (1955, 1956, 1958, 1959); 5× Second-team All-Pro (1952, 1953, 1954, 1957, 1961); 9× Pro Bowl (1952, 1953, 1955–1961); NFL 1950s All-Decade Team; NFL Best Lineman Award (1957); Pittsburgh Steelers All-Time Team; Pittsburgh Steelers Legends team; Pittsburgh Steelers Hall of Honor; Pittsburgh Steelers No. 70 retired; World Bowl champion (III); Arena Football League Coach of the Year (1990); Third-team All-American (1948); First-team All-Eastern (1948); Second-team All-Eastern (1947)

Career NFL statistics
- Games played: 173
- Games started: 143
- Fumble recoveries: 23
- Safeties: 3
- Interceptions: 2
- Stats at Pro Football Reference
- Coaching profile at Pro Football Reference
- Pro Football Hall of Fame

Ernest Alfred Stautner (April 20, 1925 – February 16, 2006) was a German-American professional football player and coach. He played as a defensive tackle in the National Football League (NFL) for the Pittsburgh Steelers. He also served as a coach for the Steelers, Washington Redskins and Dallas Cowboys. He played college football for the Boston College Eagles. Stautner was inducted into the Pro Football Hall of Fame in 1969.

== Early life ==
Stautner was born on April 20, 1925, in Prienzing near Cham, Bavaria in Germany. Stautner's family immigrated to Albany or nearby East Greenbush, New York, when he was three years old. He attended Columbia High School and the Vincentian Institute. He served in the United States Marine Corps during World War II (1943–46). He turned 20 when he fought in the Battle of Okinawa.

== College career ==
After the war, he enrolled at Boston College, where he was a four-year starter as an offensive and defensive tackle, and was selected All-New England and All-Catholic. He was a third-team Central Press All American in 1948. He also handled the team's kickoff and extra point duties. One of his teammates was future Pro Football Hall of Famer Art Donovan, who played defensive tackle next to Stautner. Donovan entered the Hall of Fame one year before Stautner. He earned a bachelor's degree in psychology in 1950.

In 1973, he was inducted into the Boston College Varsity Club Athletic Hall of Fame.

== Professional career ==
Stautner was selected by the Pittsburgh Steelers in the second round (22nd overall) of the 1950 NFL draft. He played his entire career with the Steelers, from 1950 to 1963. Despite being small even for his day at 6 ft 1 in (1.85 m) and 235 pounds (106.6 kg), he distinguished himself as one of the best defensive linemen of his era. He became the cornerstone of the Steelers' bruising defense.

Stautner was named to nine Pro Bowls in his 14-year career and only missed six games. He also made All-NFL in 1955, 1956, 1958, 1959. He retired as the career leader in safeties with three and ranked third in fumble recoveries with 23. He moved to defensive end in the later years of his career and also saw spot service at offensive guard. In 1957, he won the NFL's Best Lineman Award.

In the book Passion for Sports, a compilation of sports figure interviews published by The Sporting News, former teammate Andy Russell shares an anecdote that highlights Stautner's toughness. Russell, then a rookie playing on a team that would eventually finish in fourth place in what would be Stautner's final season, sees the grizzled veteran return to the huddle holding one of his hands in the other. Russell looks down and sees that Stautner has a compound fracture of the thumb; one of his thumb bones is visibly sticking out of his skin. Russell is the only one who notices, and Stautner says only, "What's the play?" Then he plays the rest of the defensive series. When the defense returns to the sideline, Russell watches Stautner, thinking that surely he must seek medical attention now. Instead, Stautner says to someone, "Give me some tape." Then Stautner taped up his hand into a club, and he played the rest of the game.

Before a 1958 game against the Browns, the team doctor was supposed to give Stautner a shot of Novocain to numb an injured shoulder. Instead, the doctor injected him with a dangerously high 1,200 milligrams of Demerol.

The NFL did not recognize quarterback sacks as an official statistic at the time he retired (only becoming an official statistic in 1982), but in his last three years Stautner has been unofficially credited with 15.5 sacks, including eight in 1962 at the age of 37. Stautner finished his career with three career safeties (at one time tied for the lead in league history, and now second in league history as of 2024) and 23 recovered fumbles (tied for thirteenth in league history among defensive players as of 2024). The Steelers never made the playoffs during his career, and were only above .500 three times, though during his career there were only two NFL divisions and one playoff game a year (the NFL championship game). He only missed six games during his 14-year career, despite suffering multiple cracked ribs, nose fractures, broken fingers and two broken shoulders.

== Legacy and honors ==
On September 13, 1969, Stautner was inducted into the Pro Football Hall of Fame in his first year of eligibility.

On October 25, 1964, Stautner became the first player to have his number (70) formally retired by the Steelers. He was elected to the Steelers 50th Anniversary All-Time Team in 1982 and posthumously by the Pittsburgh Steeler fans to the Steelers 75th Anniversary All-Time Team in November 2007. He was inducted into the inaugural class of the Steelers' Hall of Honor in 2017.

== Coaching career ==
From 1963 to 1964 he was a player-coach (defensive line coach) and then defensive line coach/assistant coach with the Pittsburgh Steelers. In 1965 he was the defensive line coach for the Washington Redskins.

From 1966 to 1988, he was an assistant coach with the Dallas Cowboys, serving as the team's defensive line coach from 1966 to 1972, and then as the team's defensive coordinator from 1973 to 1988. Cowboys personnel director Gil Brandt considered Stautner the unsung hero of the Cowboys defense, and observed Stautner's role in developing young players with hard work and patience. He was instrumental in the development of defensive players such as Randy White, Ed "Too Tall" Jones, and Harvey Martin.

He also devised in large part and contributed to the emergence of the team's famed "Doomsday" defense (built around Hall of Fame tackle Bob Lilly), and "Doomsday II" defense that won the 1977 Super Bowl title. Under head coach Tom Landry, Stautner would call the defense alignments during games. As a player, Stautner had once broken Landry's nose when Landry was filling in at quarterback for the New York Giants. The Giants had told Stautner before he was drafted that he was too small to play tackle for them.

The Cowboys were in five Super Bowls during Stautner's tenure with the team (Super Bowls V, VI, X, XII, and XIII), winning two. From 1966 to 1975, Stautner's defenses led the entire league or their conference in rushing defense six times.

Stautner stayed on with the Cowboys in 1989 as a scout. He coached the Dallas Texans, an Arena Football League team in their first season of play in 1990, guiding the franchise to an appearance in the ArenaBowl IV and earning the league's Coach-of-the-Year award.

Stautner was the defensive line coach for the Denver Broncos from 1991 to 1993. While with the Broncos, he coached under both Dan Reeves and Wade Phillips. From 1995 to 1997, he returned to Germany to become head coach of the Frankfurt Galaxy of NFL Europe. He would guide the team to two consecutive World Bowls in 1995 and 1996, winning in 1995.

During his NFL coaching career, Stautner's teams had a record of 272-149-5.

== Head coaching record ==
Year	Team	Overall	Conference	Standing	Bowl/playoffs
Dallas Texans (AFL) (1990)
1990	Dallas Texans	7–3		2nd	L ArenaBowl IV
Frankfurt Galaxy (WLAF) (1995–1997)
1995	Frankfurt Galaxy	6–4		2nd	W World Bowl '95
1996	Frankfurt Galaxy	6–4		2nd	L World Bowl '96
1997	Frankfurt Galaxy	4–6		5th	
Frankfurt Galaxy:		17–15			
Total:		17–15			

== Personal life and death ==
According to Cinema Treasures, Stautner is a former owner of the Sara-Placid Drive-In Theater in North Elba, New York.

Stautner, Matt Snell, Mickey Spillane, and drummer Buddy Rich each appeared in their own Miller Lite Beer commercial as the product was launched in 1973. This was the first set of ads that spawned the successful Less Filling, Tastes Great campaign.

Stautner died at a Carbondale, Colorado nursing home at age 80 from complications of Alzheimer's disease. He is buried in Texas.
