= Art Schlichter =

American football player (born 1960)

No. 10, 7
- Position: Quarterback

Personal information
- Born: April 25, 1960 (age 66); Bloomingburg, Ohio, U.S.
- Listed height: 6 ft 3 in (1.91 m)
- Listed weight: 210 lb (95 kg)

Career information
- High school: Miami Trace (Washington Court House, Ohio)
- College: Ohio State (1978–1981)
- NFL draft: 1982: 1st round, 4th overall pick

Career history
- Baltimore / Indianapolis Colts (1982–1985); Buffalo Bills (1986)*; Ottawa Rough Riders (1988); Detroit Drive (1990–1991); Cincinnati Rockers (1992)
- * Offseason or practice squad member only

Awards and highlights
- ArenaBowl champion (1990); AFL MVP (1990); First-team All-Arena (1990); Second-team All-Arena (1991); 2× First-team All-American (1979, 1980); Second-team All-American (1981); Big Ten Most Valuable Player (1981); 2× First-team All-Big Ten (1979, 1981); Second-team All-Big Ten (1980)

Career NFL statistics
- Passing attempts: 202
- Passing completions: 91
- Completion percentage: 45.0%
- TD–INT: 3–11
- Passing yards: 1,006
- Passer rating: 42.6
- Stats at Pro Football Reference

Career AFL statistics
- TD–INT: 105–28
- Passing yards: 6,067
- Passer rating: 92.21

Arthur Ernest Schlichter (/ˈʃliːstər/ SHLEE-stər; born April 25, 1960) is an American former professional football quarterback who played in the National Football League (NFL) for four seasons with the Baltimore / Indianapolis Colts franchise. He also played one Canadian Football League (CFL) season with the Ottawa Rough Riders and three Arena Football League (AFL) seasons with the Detroit Drive and Cincinnati Rockers. A highly touted college football prospect with the Ohio State Buckeyes, Schlichter's professional career was cut short by a gambling addiction that resulted in his facing legal trouble for nearly four decades.

Selected fourth overall in the 1982 NFL draft by the Colts, Schlichter appeared in only 13 games with six starts due to his gambling problems. He found greater success in the AFL, where he was named Most Valuable Player and led the Drive to victory in ArenaBowl IV in 1990, but retired two years later amid allegations of betting on games. Schlichter continued to face legal problems after the end of his football career, including serving a 10-year prison sentence on gambling-related theft and public indecency charges between 2011 and 2021.

== Early life ==
Art Schlichter was born in Bloomingburg, Ohio, on April 25, 1960. He played basketball and football at Miami Trace High School, where he showed enormous promise as a quarterback and never lost a game in thirty starts; his record was only blemished by one tie. Schlichter's gambling habit began during this period with a visit to Scioto Downs, a harness racing track near Columbus, where he and several friends pooled their resources to bet and win on a race. He quickly became a regular, and Scioto Downs remained his favorite track over the years.

Schlichter was a four-year starter at Ohio State University (OSU), the last starting quarterback for legendary Buckeyes coach Woody Hayes. According to Schlichter's father, Hayes was so enthralled with the young quarterback that he was willing to jettison his "three yards and a cloud of dust" offense and throw as many as 25 times a game if Schlichter signed with the Buckeyes. Schlichter threw the interception that led to Hayes' assault on Clemson linebacker Charlie Bauman in the 1978 Gator Bowl, an act that led to the coach's firing the next day.

In his four years as a Buckeye, between 1978 and 1981, Schlichter tallied 7,547 passing yards and 50 touchdown passes, with 46 interceptions. He also rushed for 1,303 yards and 35 touchdowns. At the time, Schlichter was OSU's all-time leader in total offense; he was passed in passing yards by J. T. Barrett in the 2010s, while Dwayne Haskins broke his single-game passing record of 458 in 2018. He finished in the top six of Heisman Trophy balloting during his last three years—fourth as a sophomore, sixth as a junior and fifth as a senior. In his sophomore year, Schlichter led the Buckeyes to an undefeated regular season. They had a chance to win at least a share of the national championship in the 1980 Rose Bowl but lost to the USC Trojans by one point. In 1981, sportswriter Ritter Collett published a biography of Schlichter entitled Straight Arrow.

During his college career, Schlichter was frequently spotted at Scioto Downs with a prominent Ohio gambler. Although the Columbus and OSU police departments became suspicious, the athletic department felt it lacked enough evidence to notify the National Collegiate Athletic Association (NCAA). Schlichter turned his attention from horses to sports betting by his junior year at OSU; by the end of that year he had lost thousands of dollars gambling on college and professional sports. On several occasions he was seen at Scioto Downs with Hayes' successor as head coach, Earle Bruce, a fact which helped cover up early problems emerging while Schlichter was at OSU.

== Professional career ==
Schlichter was picked fourth in the 1982 NFL draft by the Colts franchise, then based in Baltimore, Maryland. Expected to be the starter, Schlichter lost the job to Mike Pagel, the Colts' fourth-round pick in that year, when he appeared at practice out of shape and in a distracted state of mind. However, he was expected to be the Colts' quarterback of the future.

Schlichter's gambling continued unabated, to the point that he blew his entire $350,000 signing bonus by midseason. Even before the Colts picked him, he already owed bookies several thousand dollars. His gambling spiraled out of control during the 1982 NFL strike, when he lost $20,000 betting on college football. By the end of the strike, he had at least $700,000 in gambling debts. Years later, Schlichter said his massive losses stemmed from desperate efforts to make good his previous losses. After losing $20,000 in the first week of the strike, he doubled up the next week and lost again—starting a cycle that would continue for over a year.

Between the winter of 1982 and the spring of 1983, Schlichter lost $489,000 betting on basketball games. When bookies threatened to harm or expose Schlichter if he did not pay up (the NFL, like most major professional leagues, forbids its players from engaging in any kind of gambling activity, legal or otherwise), he went to the FBI in March 1983 and gave information that helped get the bookies arrested on federal charges. He also sought help from the NFL, as he feared the bookies would force him to throw games in return for not telling the Colts about his activities. The league suspended him indefinitely, but Commissioner Pete Rozelle reduced the suspension to thirteen months after Schlichter agreed to seek treatment for his gambling addiction. He was the first NFL player to be suspended for gambling since Alex Karras and Paul Hornung were suspended in 1963 for betting on NFL games.

Schlichter was reinstated for the 1984 season but later admitted that he'd gambled during his suspension (though not on football). He was released five games into the 1985 season, in part because the Colts heard rumors that he was gambling again. As it turned out, Schlichter had lost a significant amount of money over the spring and summer while playing golf and wrote one of his golfing partners a check for $2,000. The check was to be cashed after the season started. However, when the golfing partner contacted the Colts to see if the check was good, team and league officials feared Schlichter had relapsed. The NFL wanted Schlichter to take a polygraph test, but Colts coach Rod Dowhower had already seen enough and pushed the Colts front office to release him.

It would be Schlichter's last meaningful action in the NFL. He signed as a free agent with the Buffalo Bills in the spring of 1986. However, his tenure with the Bills effectively ended when the United States Football League (USFL) collapsed. Jim Kelly, the Bills' 1983 first-round pick, had bolted to the USFL instead but signed with the Bills when the league "won" its antitrust lawsuit ($1.00 damages trebled to $3.00); the Bills had intended all along for Kelly to be their quarterback. With Kelly now firmly in the Bills fold, Schlichter's services were no longer necessary. He sat out the 1986 season after no other team expressed interest.

In January 1987, Schlichter was arrested in New York City for his involvement in a multimillion-dollar sports betting operation. He pleaded guilty to illegal gambling in April and was sentenced to probation. That arrest came back to haunt him that summer. The Cincinnati Bengals saw enough promise in Schlichter that they were willing to bring him on as Boomer Esiason's backup. However, Rozelle vetoed the deal, citing the January arrest. Rozelle let it be known that he would not approve any NFL contract for Schlichter that season, costing him valuable work when the National Football League Players Association went on strike that year. He made another bid for reinstatement in 1988 but was turned down. That same year, he filed for bankruptcy to shield himself from creditors.

In parts of three seasons, Schlichter played only thirteen games, primarily in backup or "mop-up" roles. He made only six starts, losing them all. He threw 202 passes and completed 91 of them. He threw three touchdown passes and eleven interceptions. He amassed a quarterback rating of only 42.6 and is considered one of the biggest draft busts in NFL history. In 2007, Schlichter was listed as the #7 all-time draft bust on the NFL Network's Top 10 Draft Busts episode. In an updated list from 2010, Schlichter was moved to the #4 draft bust of all time, and in a video listing the top ten quarterback draft busts of all time, Schlichter was listed #3, behind JaMarcus Russell (#2) and Ryan Leaf (#1). In 2007, Charles Robinson of Yahoo! Sports named Schlichter the worst #4 pick since the AFL-NFL merger, writing that Colts fans long felt chagrin that Jim McMahon was taken by the Chicago Bears with the very next pick. McMahon would lead the Bears to victory in Super Bowl XX during Schlichter's final NFL season. In 2021, The Athletic named Schlichter the worst #4 pick since the merger, noting that the Colts selected him with McMahon and future Hall of Fame running back Marcus Allen on the board.

Schlichter said years later that he was distracted for much of his NFL career. He went through a messy break-up with his girlfriend before his rookie season with the Colts, and the ensuing depression led him to gamble more. Schlichter believed the accolades he received after his sophomore year at OSU diminished his drive, and the pressure of living up to that praise led him to gamble as an outlet.

After spending 1987 out of football, Schlichter signed a contract with the Ottawa Rough Riders of the Canadian Football League (CFL) in 1988. He was named the starter out of camp and saw his first meaningful game action in three years. However, he suffered broken ribs from a hit midway through the season. The Rough Riders placed him on injured reserve for thirty days then released him.

Schlichter played for the Detroit Drive of the Arena Football League (AFL) in 1990 and 1991, where he was named MVP in the former en route to winning ArenaBowl IV. His AFL success was attributed to his frequent deep passes, which caught opposing defenses off guard in an era when most AFL offenses relied on short passes. Before the 1992 season, Schlichter was traded to the expansion Cincinnati Rockers, with league officials believing his popularity in Ohio would generate interest for the franchise. Schlichter helped lead the Rockers to the playoffs in their inaugural season, but announced he was retiring from football that October. Although he said he intended instead to focus on his radio career and curing his gambling addiction, evidence later came to light that Schlichter was forced to retire rather than face being banned from the league for betting on AFL games.

== Radio career ==
While co-hosting a Rockers-focused radio show on Cincinnati station WSAI, Schlichter did well enough that he became the station's afternoon drive-time host. He had been a communications major at OSU and had done some radio work in his high school and college days. During this time, he appeared on The Phil Donahue Show to discuss his gambling addiction. In 1994, Schlichter moved to KVEG in Las Vegas, Nevada, but was fired after a few months for stealing checks from station owner Jerry Kutner in order to support his addiction.

== Extent of addiction ==
Schlichter often stole and conned money from friends and strangers when he ran low on funds to support his gambling. He also passed bad checks, as casinos still accepted personal checks when he started gambling. Schlichter wrote that he would write a check to the casino and use the money to gamble, believing he would win enough money to pay the casino back and keep the profit, but he almost always lost. In a 2007 interview for ESPN's Outside the Lines, he estimated that he'd stolen $1.5 million over the years, if not more.

Between 1987 and 1992, Schlichter was arrested three times in Ohio for passing a total of $50,000 in bad checks but received probation or suspended sentences each time. He moved to Las Vegas in 1989 after marrying longtime girlfriend Mitzi Shinaver. Schlichter claims this was in hopes of getting treatment for his addiction; however, his gambling continued unabated.

Schlichter ran up massive gambling debts while playing for the Detroit Drive, although general manager Gary Vitto helped pay some of them off. Vitto and owner Mike Ilitch tried their best to help Schlichter, keeping him on a budget and requiring him to attend meetings with therapists and Gamblers Anonymous. However, according to a 1995 profile of Schlichter in Columbus Monthly, things escalated to the point that even without the AFL wanting to give the expansion Rockers a shot in the arm, Schlichter would have had to leave Detroit for his own safety. Soon after arriving in Cincinnati, he was arrested in July for passing a bad check. Despite Schlichter's admission to suffering a relapse, the Rockers were willing to work out a deal in which they put most of Schlichter's paycheck into an account to pay his gambling debts, except for $300 which they gave to Mitzi. Even then, Schlichter's gambling continued unabated; at various points in the 1992 season, there were police waiting for Schlichter in the locker room.

By the end of the 1992 season, the Rockers were losing patience with Schlichter and asked him to take a substantial pay cut if he wanted to return for the 1993 season. In a 2020 interview, former AFL commissioner Joe O'Hara said that around this time, Las Vegas oddsmaker Roxy Roxborough alerted league officials that Schlichter was betting on AFL games. When O'Hara learned this, he ordered the Rockers to release Schlichter. However, Schlichter was allowed to save face by publicly announcing his retirement.

The pattern continued during Schlichter's time as a sports talk host. According to longtime Cincinnati radio personality Mike Wolfe, who worked with Schlichter at WSAI, Schlichter was known to try to wrangle money out of callers. Station management covered for Schlichter when a victim of one of his cons came after him. Kutner recalled that at KVEG, his penchant for bilking his friends and bouncing checks was a topic of on-air discussion.

The habit took a considerable toll on his marriage. Schlichter pawned off Mitzi's wedding ring to get money to gamble, only to later discover it had been sold when he tried to get it back. He frequently stayed up late tracking scores; Mitzi often found him vomiting the next morning from what he claimed was the flu but was actually nerves. He also stole money from Mitzi as well.

Mitzi claims that, in order to protect herself and her children, she never allowed Schlichter to have a checkbook. She only reluctantly agreed to move with him to Las Vegas for a second time in 1994, warning him that it was his last chance. Schlichter's father and other family members questioned the move, knowing that his real motivation was to gamble legally. Kutner also had doubts, knowing about Schlichter's penchant for gambling. Soon after they arrived in Las Vegas, Schlichter took a box of old checks from his sister-in-law and used them to obtain money to gamble. He lost it all, and when it was apparent he couldn't pay it back, the bank reported him to the FBI. Mitzi finally lost patience and took her two daughters back to Indiana. After losing hundreds of thousands of dollars, along with virtually all he owned, Schlichter went back to Indiana as well in hopes of reconciling with his wife.

Soon afterward, in October, Schlichter was charged with fraud for passing $175,000 in bad checks at Las Vegas casinos, many of which he'd stolen from Kutner. He'd passed most of the checks at Treasure Island. When he pleaded guilty, federal prosecutors were initially willing to offer a deal that would let Schlichter self-report to a federal prison camp for a sentence of fifteen months. However, when prosecutors learned that he'd been passing bad checks in Indiana as well, they persuaded a judge to remand him to custody. In January 1995, Schlichter was sentenced to two years in prison. Prosecutors later discovered Schlichter had passed $500,000 in bad checks in Indiana, Nevada and his native Ohio.

Schlichter was released in April 1996 after serving sixteen months, only to be arrested that fall for stealing checks from his employer and using them to get $8,500 to gamble. This time, he was sentenced to eight years in federal prison. Mitzi formally divorced him soon afterward, in 1998. He was released on probation in 1999 after serving thirteen months and returned home to Bloomingburg, where he told friends that he still had connections to get prime tickets for OSU football games. He told others that if they fronted him the money to buy the tickets, he would share the profits, but instead used the money to gamble. Schlichter ultimately stole $500,000 from a dozen individuals—including his father—before he was arrested, pled guilty and sentenced to five years in prison.

Between 1995 and 2006, Schlichter served the equivalent of ten years in forty-four different county jails and federal prisons. Counting time served while awaiting sentencing, he spent all but 358 days between November 1994 and June 2006 behind bars. During that time, he also had his public defender, Linda Wagoner, smuggle a cell phone into the Marion County, Indiana, jail so he could place bets. Wagoner was sentenced to two years' probation and had her law license suspended for ninety days.

Schlichter later said that he hit rock bottom in 2004 after he was caught gambling in prison and placed in solitary confinement. He was originally supposed to spend four months there, but was released after 100 days for good behavior. Schlichter was released from prison on June 16, 2006, and resided with his mother in Washington Court House, Ohio. By one estimate, he owed half a million dollars in restitution.

Schlichter founded a non-profit organization, Gambling Prevention Awareness, to educate others about the perils of problem gambling, including college and NFL players. In late 2009, Schlichter and his mother appeared in television ads opposing a statewide ballot issue legalizing casinos in select cities of Ohio. He also wrote an autobiography, Busted, with sportswriter Jeff Snook. Also in 2009, he began working at Columbus radio station WTVN, joining longtime host John Corby on Wednesdays.

== 2011 arrest ==
Around the same time, Schlichter visited a church in Westerville, Ohio, to speak about his addiction. There, he reunited with Anita Valko Barney, a Columbus heiress and the widow of a former CEO of Wendy's. Her son, Alan Valko, had been gravely injured in a 1981 plane crash that killed his father and three others; Barney believed that Alan's recovery was due in large part to Schlichter visiting his bedside. Over the next two-plus years, Schlichter conned over a million dollars out of Barney, nearly depleting her fortune.

On February 9, 2011, reports emerged that Schlichter was under investigation for fraud. It subsequently emerged that Schlichter had conned thousands of dollars under the pretense of buying prime seats at OSU football games. He was charged with a first-degree felony in connection with the theft of more than $1 million on February 14, 2011.

Prosecutors later said that Schlichter resumed his gambling almost as soon as he had left prison in 2006. They discovered he'd visited gambling dens in Nevada, Indiana, West Virginia and riverboat casinos along the Ohio River. Schlichter also relaunched his ticket-buying scheme as early as 2009. Corby recalled that in that year, Schlichter had suggested that he had connections to get OSU basketball tickets. Corby almost went along but thought better of it after his wife noticed it was very similar to a scheme Schlichter described in his autobiography. As it turned out, Schlichter got tickets from brokers across central Ohio, often paying four times face value. As the scheme went along, Schlichter manipulated Barney into soliciting her wealthy friends for money and helping him buy tickets.

By late 2010, Schlichter sensed he was nearing the end of his tether. In a desperate attempt to stem the tide, he promised to get tickets for Super Bowl XLV. However, when that scheme collapsed, Schlichter turned himself in on February 9, 2011. He subsequently admitted that he "probably" used part of the money to gamble.

On September 15, 2011, Schlichter pleaded guilty to state charges of theft and engaging in a pattern of corrupt activity. He was sentenced to ten years in state prison. A month later, on October 11, he pleaded guilty to federal charges of wire fraud, bank fraud and filing a false tax return. Schlichter admitted to using the money he obtained from the ticket scam to either gamble, pay back previous debts, or buy personal items. He also admitted to falsifying his 2008 tax return and hiding almost $38,500 in income from the U.S. government.

While under house arrest awaiting assignment to a state prison, Schlichter tested positive for cocaine while serving house arrest on federal charges resulting from the same case (and while still on probation from his Indiana sentence) on January 19, 2012. On May 4, 2012, as a result of the positive drug test, he was sentenced to ten years, seven months in federal prison (up from an original eight years, four months originally agreed to on the fraud case) to be served concurrently with the Ohio sentence, plus $2.2 million in restitution; the Indiana probation was canceled with the federal sentence.

Barney admitted her role in the scheme and cooperated with prosecutors and law enforcement to bring Schlichter down. She was later sentenced to three years' probation. She was also ordered to pay $400,000 in restitution, forcing her to auction off nearly everything she owned and give up her house. In 2015, Barney published a book, Quarterback Sneak, recounting her experiences with Schlichter. She wrote that Schlichter likely set his sights on her soon after they met. She believes that in hindsight, she missed a number of red flags about Schlichter's story; while he talked a lot about the impact his addiction had on him, he never mentioned his wife and children.

Schlichter was incarcerated at FCI Williamsburg in Salters, South Carolina, and later spent time at FCI Florence in Florence, Colorado. According to The Indianapolis Star, he continued to gamble while in prison, having women place bets for him and running a Super Bowl ticket scheme. When prison officials learned about it, they cut off his email access for ninety days. Schlichter was released from federal prison on August 18, 2020, and transferred to Ohio state custody to serve the remainder of his sentence.

Schlichter's lawyers had attempted to get the remainder of his sentence waived for health reasons. However, Franklin County Common Pleas judge Chris Brown took a dim view of the request, saying that Schlichter was "past the point of rehabilitation" and had not shown that he would "conduct (himself appropriately)" if released. Brown added that he was sympathetic to Schlichter's health concerns, and would have been more than willing to grant an early release if there was any evidence of remorse. However, Brown said, Schlichter had "demonstrated over and over" that he could not be trusted.

Schlichter, Ohio Department of Rehabilitation and Correction inmate #A777924, was incarcerated at Ohio State Penitentiary in Youngstown. He was paroled on June 14, 2021; his second day of eligibility.

== Further arrests ==
On June 6, 2022, Schlichter was found unresponsive by police at the Hampton Inn in Hilliard, Ohio. Police, who were responding to a report of an overdose, used Narcan to resuscitate Schlichter and took him to a hospital. A substance was found in his room which was later revealed to be cocaine after testing. Schlichter pleaded guilty and was subsequently charged with cocaine possession on October 11, being sentenced to one year of probation on September 13, 2023.

A few months later, on February 2, 2024, an Ohio Highway Patrol officer found Schlichter on a street in Columbus, standing beside his disabled vehicle. The officer would discover drug paraphernalia on the car's floorboard. Schlichter was subsequently searched and handed over a pair of glass pipes. He was arrested and charged with cocaine possession, as well as possessing drug paraphernalia. On August 25, 2025, he pled guilty to felony drug possession that saw him sentenced to two years of probation with weekly drug tests.

== Health issues ==
Doctors have diagnosed Schlichter with Parkinson's disease and dementia—the side effects of numerous concussions (between fifteen and seventeen, depending on the source) suffered over twenty years of football at the junior high, high school, college and professional levels. His public defender in the 2011 case, Steven Nolder, said that Schlichter has been diagnosed with "deficits" in his frontal lobes, which have been linked to depression, impulsivity and impaired judgment. According to Snook, doctors believe that Schlichter has chronic traumatic encephalopathy (CTE), a degenerative disease caused by repeated blows to the head which has been found to be common among football players. Protective equipment (especially helmets) was inferior during much of Schlichter's high school, collegiate and NFL days. Even during his CFL and Arena League days, concussions and head injuries were just considered part of the game.

== In popular culture ==
Schlichter was mentioned in the 2006 Prison Break episode "By the Skin and the Teeth" and in 2017 was the subject of Season 11, Episode 14 of American Greed titled "Art Schlichter, All American Fraud."

== See also ==
- 1978 Ohio State Buckeyes football team – 1978 Gator Bowl
- 1979 Ohio State Buckeyes football team – 1980 Rose Bowl
- 1980 Ohio State Buckeyes football team – 1980 Fiesta Bowl
- 1981 Ohio State Buckeyes football team – 1981 Liberty Bowl
