= Jeff Snook =

American journalist

Jeff Snook (born 21 March 1960, in Ashland, Ohio) is an American sports writer and a 1982 graduate of The Ohio State University's School of Journalism.

Snook has written 14 non-fiction books, including his most recent, co-authoring Hawaiian Tropic founder Ron Rice's autobiography, "Great Times and Tan Lines," which was released in June of 2022. Snook also co-authored Ken "Hawk" Harrelson's autobiography "Hawk: I Did It My Way," with the former Major-Leaguer and current Chicago White Sox play-by-play announcer. Snook also co-wrote longtime Virginia Tech Coach Frank Beamer's autobiography, "Let Me Be Frank." He also co-wrote "Busted: The Rise and Fall of Art Schlichter" with Art Schlichter, a former quarterback who was suspended by NFL Commissioner Pete Rozelle. He has written four books related to Ohio State football, including "What It Means To Be a Buckeye,", and others on the Oklahoma Sooners, Nebraska Cornhuskers and Florida Gators.

In recent years, Snook has written politics and general commentary for The Ohio Press Network.
