= Aatron Kenney =

American football player (born 1963)

Profile
- Position: Wide receiver/Defensive back

Personal information
- Born: September 6, 1963 (age 63); Dallas, Texas, U. S.
- Listed height: 5 ft 10 in (1.78 m)
- Listed weight: 160 lb (73 kg)

Career information
- College: Wisconsin–Stevens Point
- NFL draft: 1988: 12th round, 308th overall pick

Career history
- Dallas Texans (1990–1991)

Aatron Kenney (born September 6, 1963) is an American former professional football wide receiver who played for Dallas Texans of the Arena Football League (AFL). He played college football at University of Wisconsin–Stevens Point.

Kenney, who was also a sprinter, had played college football at Cisco College and for the Angelo State Rams prior to transferring to Stevens Point. Stevens Point won the national championship in the 1987 season, but soon after it was reported that Kenney and another player had falsified information on transfer documents and were ineligible to play, and thus the team had to forfeit all its wins and its national championship.
