= Julius Dawkins =

American football player (born 1961)

No. 89
- Position: Wide receiver

Personal information
- Listed height: 6 ft 1 in (1.85 m)
- Listed weight: 196 lb (89 kg)

Career information
- High school: Monessen (Monessen, Pennsylvania)
- College: Pittsburgh
- NFL draft: 1983: 12th round, 320th overall pick

Career history
- Buffalo Bills (1983–1984); Pittsburgh Gladiators (1988, 1990)

Awards and highlights
- Second-team All-Arena (1990); First-team All-American (1981); First-team All-East (1981)

Career NFL statistics
- Receptions: 32
- Receiving yards: 418
- Receiving touchdowns: 3
- Stats at Pro Football Reference
- Stats at ArenaFan.com

Julius Dawkins is an American former professional football player who was a wide receiver in the National Football League (NFL) and Arena Football League (AFL). He was selected by the Buffalo Bills in the 12th round of the 1983 NFL draft. As a college football player with the Pittsburgh Panthers, he set a Pitt record with four touchdown catches in a game. Dawkins also played for the Pittsburgh Gladiators.

== College career ==
In his junior year at Pitt in 1981, he was an Associated Press first-team All-American after hauling in 46 receptions for 767 yards and 16 touchdowns. College Football News ranked Dawkins the fourth best receiver in the history of the University of Pittsburgh.

== Professional career ==
=== Buffalo Bills ===
Dawkins was selected 320th overall by the Buffalo Bills in the 12th round of the 1983 NFL draft. In two years with the team he started five of 27 games, recording 32 receptions or 418 yards and three touchdowns.

=== Pittsburgh Gladiators ===
Dawkins played two years in the Arena Football League for the Pittsburgh Gladiators in 1988 and 1990. During the two years he had 90 receptions for 1,334 yards and 30 touchdowns as a receiver and 21 tackles and three interceptions as a linebacker.
