= Cincinnati Rockers =

Arena football team in Ohio, US

Logo

General information
- Founded: 1992
- Folded: 1993
- Headquartered: Riverfront Coliseum in Cincinnati, Ohio
- Colors: Cal Poly Green, yellow, white
- Mascot: Rockerman

Personnel
- Owner: Ted Gregory
- General manager: Ted Gregory
- Head coach: Joe Haering
- President: Ted Gregory

Team history
- Cincinnati Rockers (1992–1993)

Home fields
- Riverfront Coliseum (1992–1993)

League / conference affiliations
- Arena Football League (1992–1993): American Conference (1993); Northern Division (1992)

Playoff appearances (1)
- 1992

The Cincinnati Rockers were an arena football team based in Cincinnati, Ohio. They began play in 1992 as an expansion team in the Arena Football League and competed through the 1993 season before they suspended operations due to low attendance. The Rockers played their home games at the Riverfront Coliseum.

== History ==
=== 1992 ===
The Rockers were announced in 1991 after successful restaurant owner Ted Gregory was granted an Arena league expansion franchise. As one of four expansion teams for 1992, the Rockers sold 5,700 season tickets. In a bid to give the new franchise some credibility, the league persuaded the league's strongest team, the Detroit Drive, to trade Art Schlichter to Cincinnati. Schlichter had grown up in nearby Bloomingburg and had starred at Ohio State, and still had some name recognition in the area.

Additionally, the compulsive gambling that had derailed Schlichter's NFL career had continued unabated during his two years with the Drive, to the point that he had to leave Detroit for his own safety. Schlichter signed a one-year $40,000 contract. Soon after that, he was arrested for passing a bad check, and admitted suffering a gambling relapse. Gregory worked out a deal in which the team put most of Schlichter's paycheck into an account to pay off his gambling debts, except for $300 that they gave to his wife, Mitzi. It was to no avail; police were frequently waiting for Schlichter in the locker room.

The Rockers finished their first season in the league with a surprising 7–3 record, but lost in the first round of the playoffs 41–36 to the Tampa Bay Storm.

=== 1993 ===
The Rockers suffered a major blow in the 1992-93 offseason when Schlichter was forced to retire. League officials learned that Schlichter was betting on AFL games. League commissioner Joe O'Hara recalled in 2020 that when he learned this, he called Gregory and told him Schlichter had to go. Facing the prospect of being banned from the league, Schlichter was allowed to publicly save face by retiring. Even before then, the Rockers were losing patience with Schlichter's gambling; they had asked him to take a substantial pay cut to return for 1993.

The team ceased operations following a 2–10 season in 1993. The team's attendance fell by almost 50%, leading to Tom Gregory's decision to drop out of the AFL for the 1994 season. Gregory attempted to find additional sponsors to re-launch the team in 1995, but he instead sold the franchise to the Hartford Sports & Entertainment Group, who moved the franchise to Hartford, Connecticut and became known as the Connecticut Coyotes.

=== Season-by-season ===
Season records
| Season | W | L | T | Finish | Playoff results |
|---|---|---|---|---|---|
| 1992 | 7 | 3 | 0 | 2nd Northern | Lost Week 1 (Tampa Bay 41-36) |
| 1993 | 2 | 10 | 0 | 5th Am. Conf. | – n/a – |
| Totals | 9 | 14 | 0 | (including playoffs) | |

== Logos & uniform ==
The team color scheme incorporated bright yellow and green.

== Notable players ==
=== Final roster ===
Cincinnati Rockers roster
| Quarterbacks: -- Blair Kiel; -- Brent Pease; -- David Riley; Wide Receivers/Defensive Backs: -- Charley Bowen; -- Brad Calip; -- Richard Carey; -- Wayne Coffey; 84 Ira Hillary; -- Joe Johnson; -- Bruce LaSane; 1 Gary Mullen; -- Bobby Roland; -- Marcus W. Martin | Fullbacks/Linebackers: -- John Clark; 32 Mel Mills; 34 Dan Sellers; Offensive Linemen/Defensive Linemen: -- Kevin Allen; -- Joe Brunson; -- Kevin Carroll; -- Lamar Davis; -- John Dixon; -- David Edeen; -- Cecil Fletcher; -- Steve Houghton; -- Jerry Renners; -- Mick Roessler; -- Craig Schlichting; -- Steve Slay | Wide Receiver/Linebackers: -- Falanda Newton; Kickers: -- Rusty Fricke; —- David Browndyke; Rookies in italics Roster updated July 15, 2013; 29 Active, 0 Inactive, 0 PS → More rosters |

=== Arena Football Hall of Famers ===
Cincinnati Rockers Hall of Famers
| No. | Name | Year Inducted | Position(s) | Years w/ Rockers |
| 1 | Gary Mullen | 1998 | WR/DB | 1993 |

=== Other players ===
- Chris Barber, Defensive specialist 1992
- Tony Collins, Fullback/linebacker 1992
- Art Schlichter, Quarterback 1992
- David Smith, Fullback/linebacker 1992
- Jackie Walker, Offensive/defensive lineman 1992
- Vince Hale, Offensive/defensive lineman 1992

== Head coaches ==
| Name | Term | Regular season | | | | Playoffs | | Awards | Reference |
| Name | Term | W | L | T | Win% | W | L | Awards | Reference |
|---|---|---|---|---|---|---|---|---|---|
| Fran Curci | 1992 | 7 | 3 | 0 | .700 | 0 | 1 | | |
| Joe Haering | 1993 | 2 | 10 | 0 | .167 | 0 | 0 | | |

== Notes ==
- The team appeared on the game EA Sports Arena Football and Arena Football: Road to Glory as a hidden bonus team.
