= Carl Aikens Jr. =

American football player (born 1962)

No. 83, 84
- Position: Wide receiver

Personal information
- Born: June 5, 1962 (age 64); Great Lakes, Illinois, U.S.
- Listed height: 6 ft 1 in (1.85 m)
- Listed weight: 185 lb (84 kg)

Career information
- High school: Curie (Chicago, Illinois)
- College: Northern Illinois
- NFL draft: 1985: undrafted

Career history
- Indianapolis Colts (1985)*; St. Louis Cardinals (1985)*; Cincinnati Bengals (1986)*; Green Bay Packers (1986)*; Los Angeles Raiders (1987); Chicago Bruisers (1988–1989); Dallas Texans (1990–1991); Orlando Predators (1992–1993); Milwaukee Mustangs (1994)
- * Offseason or practice squad member only

Awards and highlights
- 3× First-team All-Arena (1988, 1989, 1990); AFL Ironman of the Year (1989); Arena Football Hall of Fame inductee (2000)

Career NFL statistics
- Receptions: 8
- Receiving yards: 134
- Touchdowns: 3
- Rush attempts: 1
- Rushing yards: 1
- Stats at Pro Football Reference

Career AFL statistics
- Receptions: 194
- Receiving yards: 3,092
- Touchdowns: 59
- Tackles: 147
- Interceptions: 11
- Stats at ArenaFan.com

Carl Kenneth Aikens Jr. (born June 5, 1962) is an American former professional football player who was a wide receiver and defensive back in the National Football League (NFL) and Arena Football League (AFL). He played college football for the Northern Illinois Huskies.

Aikens played in the NFL for the Los Angeles Raiders in 1987 before playing seven seasons in the AFL for the Chicago Bruisers, Dallas Texans, Orlando Predators & the Milwaukee Mustangs.

In 2000, Aikens was inducted into the Arena Football Hall of Fame.

== College career ==
Aikens played collegiately at Northern Illinois University, where he was a three-year letter writer for the Huskies football team. (1981, 1983–84). As a senior in 1984, Aikens was named an All-Mid-American Conference Honorable Mention at Split End.

== Professional career ==
=== Orlando Predators ===
In 1992, Aikens joined the Orlando Predators. Aikens was a productive member of the Predators on both offense and defense, helping them reach ArenaBowl VI.

=== Milwaukee Mustangs ===
In 1994, the Predators traded Aikens to the expansion Milwaukee Mustangs for future considerations.
