= Chris Armstrong (gridiron football) =

American gridiron football player (born 1967)

No. 81
- Position: Wide receiver

Personal information
- Born: August 28, 1967 (age 59); Fayetteville, North Carolina, U.S.
- Listed height: 6 ft 2 in (1.88 m)
- Listed weight: 210 lb (95 kg)

Career information
- College: Fayetteville

Career history
- 1990: Washington Commandos
- 1991–1992: Edmonton Eskimos
- 1992: Ottawa Rough Riders
- 1994–1995: Baltimore Stallions
- 1996–1998: Montreal Alouettes
- 1998–1999: Winnipeg Blue Bombers

Awards and highlights
- Grey Cup champion (1995); CFL East All-Star (1994); Second-team All-Arena (1990)

Career statistics
- Receiving: 449 (Avg: 18.0 yards)
- Longest receiving: 97
- Receiving TDs: 69
- Kickoff returns: 37 (Avg: 19.8 yards)
- Kickoff TDs: 0

Christopher Armstrong (born August 28, 1967) is a former Canadian Football League receiver who played 9 seasons for five different teams. In 2008, he was named offensive coordinator of the Maryland Maniacs of the Indoor Football League. He was previously the head coach at National Academy Foundation High School (NAF) in Baltimore City Maryland. In the 2017 he became the head coach at Loch Raven High School in Towson Maryland and is currently going into his second year there. Armstrong said his five favorite players at Loch Raven High are LaMonte Brown, Adrian Hayes, Tariq Davis, Jessie Mayo and Kenneth Sweeney saying that they laid the foundation for the underclassmen to turn the struggling program around.

Armstrong attended college at Fayetteville State University.
