= Kevin Murphy (lineman) =

American football player (born 1965)

Profile
- Positions: Offensive lineman, defensive lineman

Personal information
- Born: July 4, 1965 (age 61); Syracuse, New York, U.S.
- Listed height: 6 ft 3 in (1.91 m)
- Listed weight: 260 lb (118 kg)

Career information
- High school: West Genesee (Camillus, New York)
- College: Boston University

Career history
- New England Steamrollers (1988); Albany Firebirds (1990)

Awards and highlights
- First-team All-Arena (1990); Second-team All-Arena (1988)

Career AFL statistics
- Tackles: 28.5
- Sacks: 6.5
- Fumble recoveries: 2
- Blocked kicks: 3
- Pass breakups: 1
- Stats at ArenaFan.com

Kevin Murphy (born July 4, 1965) is an American former professional football lineman who played two seasons in the Arena Football League (AFL) with the New England Steamrollers and Albany Firebirds. Murphy played college football at Boston University.

== Early life ==
Murphy played high school football at West Genesee High School in Camillus, New York. He also participated in wrestling for the Wildcats.

== College career ==
Murphy played college football for the Boston University Terriers. He earned NCAA Division I-AA All-American and Yankee Conference Defensive Player of the Year honors as a defensive tackle in 1986. He also earned first-team All-Yankee Conference honors in 1986. Murphy was inducted into Boston University's Scarlet Key Society in 1990.

== Professional career ==
Murphy played for the New England Steamrollers in 1988, earning second-team All-Arena honors. He played for the Albany Firebirds in 1990, garnering first-team All-Arena recognition.
