= Roxy Roxborough =

American odds maker

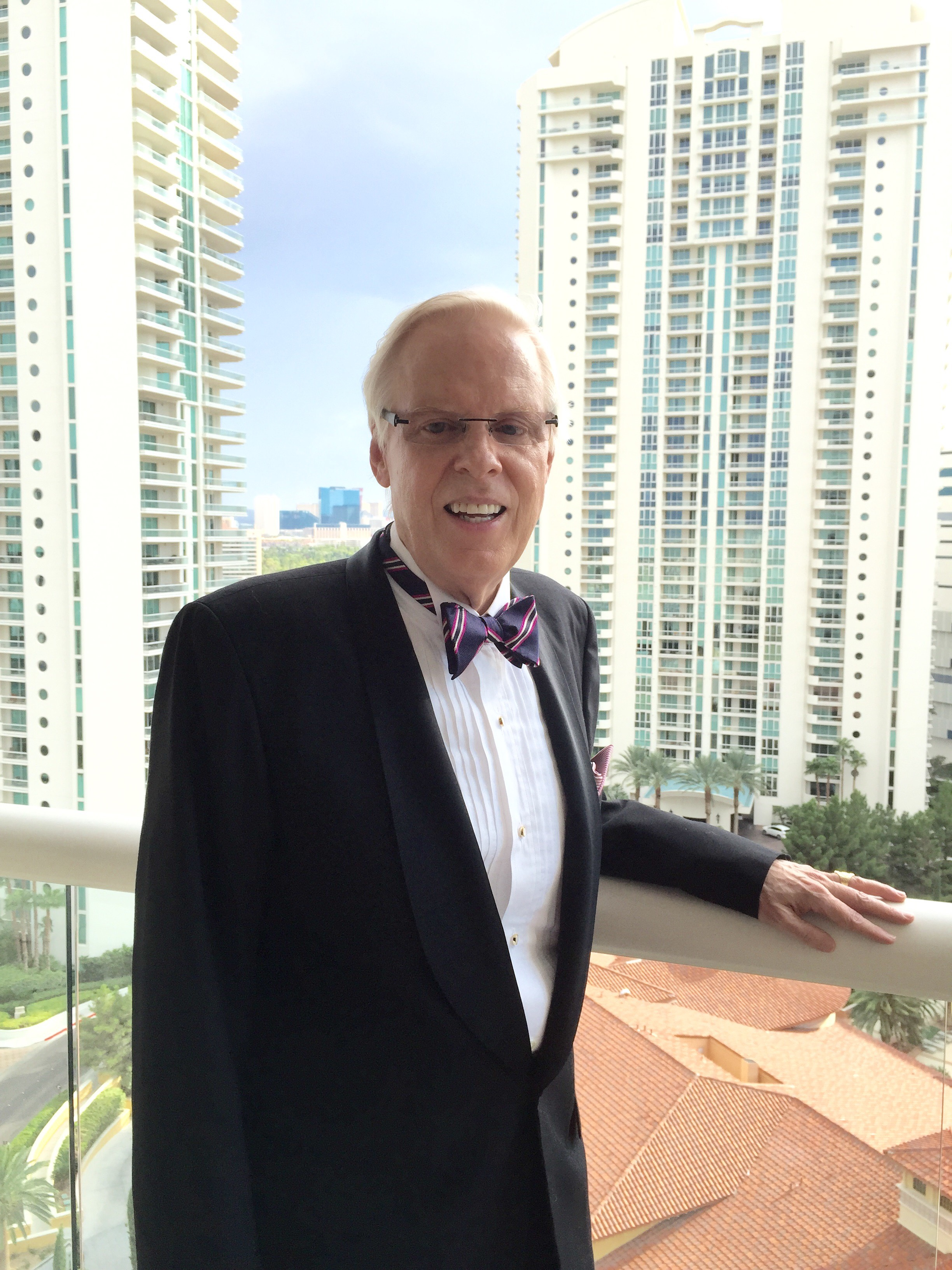
- Roxy Roxborough on the Las Vegas Strip, 2015
- Born: Michael Roxborough; 1951 (age 74–75)
- Occupations: American odds maker, syndicated columnist, teacher and author.

Michael "Roxy" Roxborough (born 1951) is an American odds maker, syndicated columnist, teacher and author. He is best known as founder and owner of Las Vegas Sports Consultants (1982–1999), the international odds making company licensed by the Nevada Gaming Control Board. Roxborough is credited with introducing mathematical formulas and computer models to the multi-billion dollar sports wagering industry. The Las Vegas Review-Journal listed Roxborough number two in its list of the most influential people in sports of the 20th century.

Roxborough was a co-founder of American Wagering Inc, the first U.S. bookmaking company to be listed on a public stock exchange in 1996 (Nasdaq: BETM). He served as a director from the company's inception until March 11, 1998. The company was subsequently purchased by UK Bookmakers William Hill PLC.

With partner Benjamin Lee Eckstein in 1986, Roxborough co-founded “America’s Line,” a daily newspaper sports odds column syndicated by Universal Press in 1988 appearing in more than 120 North American newspapers.

Roxborough and Mike Rhoden co-authored “Sports Book Management: A Guide to the Legal Bookmaker”, originally published in 1988 and updated in 1991 and 1998 (OCLC 40281354). The 112 page book was a text for the college course Race and Sports Book Management that Roxborough taught at the College of Southern Nevada (formerly Clark County Community College) as part of the Casino Management curriculum.

Roxborough was a partner in the 1997 Sprint Champion and Eclipse Award winning thoroughbred race horse Smoke Glacken.

The novel Gambling on Magic by Christopher G. Moore (Heaven Lake Press) was loosely based on Roxborough's life.

Roxborough is featured in the 2016 sports gambling documentary The Best of It.

in 2023, Roxborough was inducted into the Sports Gambling Hall of Fame at Circa Resort & Casino in Las Vegas.

== Accolades ==
The 50 Greatest Sports Figures in Nevada History.

The 50 Most Important People in Sports.

The 10 Most Influential People in Gaming.
