= Ben Bennett =

American football player and coach (born 1962)

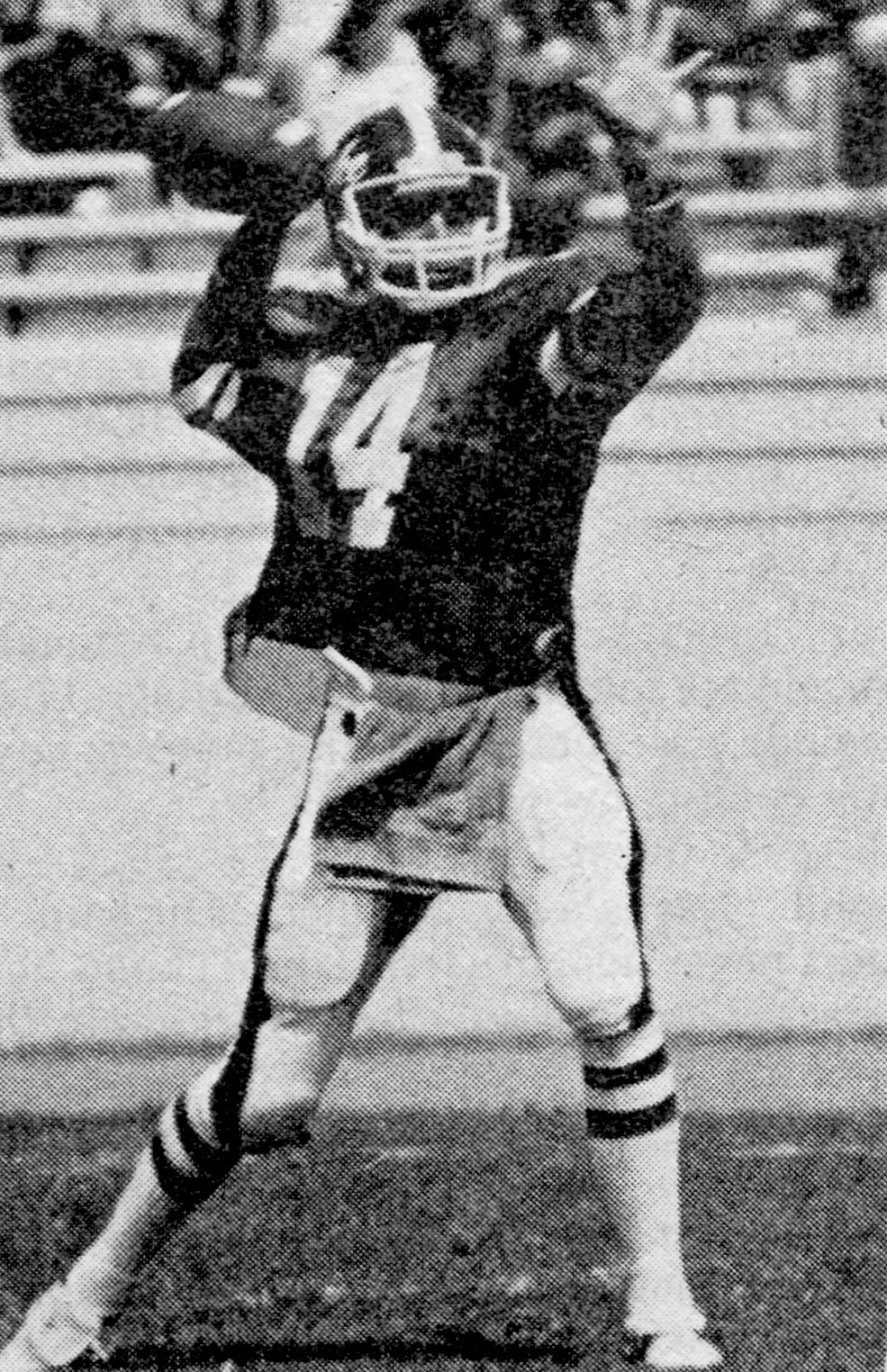
- Bennett at Duke in 1980

No. 14, 16, 5
- Position: Quarterback

Personal information
- Born: May 5, 1962 (age 64); Sunnyvale, California, U.S.
- Listed height: 6 ft 1 in (1.85 m)
- Listed weight: 200 lb (91 kg)

Career information
- High school: Peterson (Sunnyvale)
- College: Duke
- NFL draft: 1984: 6th round, 148th overall pick

Career history

Playing
- Jacksonville Bulls (1984); Atlanta Falcons (1985)*; Houston Oilers (1986)*; Dallas Cowboys (1987); Cincinnati Bengals (1987); Chicago Bears (1988); Chicago Bruisers (1988–1989); Albany Firebirds (1990)*; Dallas Texans (1990); Sacramento Surge (1991); San Antonio Riders (1991); Orlando Predators (1991–1995); San Jose SaberCats (1996); Portland Forest Dragons (1997)
- * Offseason or practice squad member only

Coaching
- Milwaukee Mustangs (1998) Assistant coach; Duke University (1999) Assistant coach; Greensboro Prowlers (2000) Assistant coach; Florida Bobcats (2001) Assistant coach; Florida Firecats (2002–2004) Head coach; Manchester Wolves (2005–2007) Head coach; Austin Wranglers (2008) Head coach; Amarillo Dusters (2009) Head coach; Orlando Fantasy (2010) Head coach; New Orleans VooDoo (2011) Offensive coordinator; Orlando Predators (2012) Offensive coordinator; Orlando Predators (2020–2021) Head coach

Awards and highlights
- AFL MVP (1988); 3× First-team All-Arena (1988, 1993, 1994); Second-team All-Arena (1990); AFL Hall of Fame (2000); AFL 25 Greatest Players – #23 (2012); Third-team All-American (1983); 2× ACC Player of the Year (1982, 1983); 2× First-team All-ACC (1982, 1983); ACC Rookie of the Year (1980)

Career NFL statistics
- Completions: 2
- Attempts: 5
- Passing yards: 25
- TD–INT: 0–1
- Stats at Pro Football Reference

Career AFL statistics
- Attempts-Completions: 1,928-1,069
- Passing yards: 14,168
- TD–INT: 267–81
- Stats at ArenaFan.com

Allen Beverly "Ben" Bennett II (born May 5, 1962) is an American former professional football player who was a quarterback in the National Football League (NFL) for the Dallas Cowboys, Cincinnati Bengals and Chicago Bears. He also was a member of the Jacksonville Bulls, Chicago Bruisers, Dallas Texans, Sacramento Surge, San Antonio Riders, Orlando Predators, San Jose SaberCats and Portland Forest Dragons. He was a football coach in the Arena Football League (AFL), af2, and National Arena League (NAL). He played college football for the Duke Blue Devils, earning third team All-American honors in 1983.

== Early life ==
Bennett attended Peterson High School in Sunnyvale, California, where he was the starter at quarterback. He was the team captain and a highly recruited player as a senior. In his high school career he set 18 school records and 9 Santa Clara Valley Athletic League records.

== College career ==
=== Freshman season ===
Bennett accepted a football scholarship from Duke University under head coach "Red" Wilson and young assistant Steve Spurrier, who was entering his first season as an offensive coordinator and primary play caller.

Bennett played in all 11 games during Duke's 1980 season. His best individual game was a November contest against Wake Forest in which he set three NCAA freshman passing records by completing 38 of 62 passes for 469 yards. He finished the season with 174 of 330 completions for 2,050 yards, 11 touchdowns and a school record 25 interceptions. He was twice named ACC Offensive Player of the Week and was voted the ACC 1980 Rookie of the Year.

=== Sophomore season ===
In 1981, he injured his shoulder during the season opener, missing the next three games and he also had to overcome a challenge for the starting job from backup Ron Sally. He punted against the University of South Carolina twice for an average of 41 yards. He came back against Virginia Tech and completed 9 of 16 passes for 113 yards with one touchdown.

He had his best games against Maryland (31 of 46 for 397 yards and 2 touchdowns) and Clemson University (17 of 25 for 243 yards and one touchdown). In nine games, he completed 110 of 202 passes for 1,445 yards, with 7 touchdowns and 8 interceptions.

=== Junior season ===
In 1982, he became the first player in the ACC in its 30 years history to pass for over 3,000 yards with 3,033, receiving ACC Player of the Year and All-ACC honors. He set numerous records, including ACC career marks for most passing yards (6,528), most passes attempted (906), most passes completed (520), and most touchdown passes (38). He was named Sports Illustrated's Offensive Player of the Week following the season finale against University of North Carolina while passing for 273 yards, completing 25 of 34 passes, with one touchdown and no interceptions.

In the 4th quarter against Navy, he completed an NCAA record 21 passes with three touchdowns. He threw at least one touchdown pass in every game. Bennett had a completion percentage of 63.1 and a passing efficiency rating of 142.5. In 11 games, he completed 236 of 374 attempts for 3,033 yards with 20 touchdowns and 12 interceptions.

=== Senior season ===
In 1983, he completed 300 of 469 pass attempts for 3,086 yards with 17 touchdowns and one interception, averaging 280.54 yards per game.

Bennett completed his collegiate career as the top passer in the history of NCAA Division I-A football, with the most passes attempted (1,375), most passes completed (820), and most yardage (9,614), surpassing marks set by John Elway and Jim McMahon. He left with 7 NCAA, 15 ACC and 42 school records.

In 2011, he was inducted into the Duke University Athletics Hall of Fame. In 2011, he was a member of the ACC Legends Class.

== Professional career ==
Bennett was selected by the Atlanta Falcons in the 6th round (148th overall) of the 1984 NFL draft. On May 5, he instead chose to sign with the Jacksonville Bulls of the United States Football League, who selected him in the 1984 territorial draft. He was a backup behind Robbie Mahfouz and Matt Robinson. He appeared in 2 games, completing 7 of 13 passes for 113 yards with one touchdown and no interceptions. On February 7, 1985, he was released after the signing of Brian Sipe.

On February 26, 1985, he was signed by the Falcons to participate in their training camp. He was waived on August 4. In 1986, he signed as a free agent with the Houston Oilers. He was cut on August 25.

After the NFLPA strike was declared on the third week of the 1987 season, those contests were canceled (reducing the 16-game season to 15) and the NFL decided that the games would be played with replacement players. He was signed to be a part of the Dallas replacement team that was given the mock name "Rhinestone Cowboys" by the media on October 1. He was a backup quarterback and didn't appear in any game. He was cut on October 7. On October 9, he was claimed off waivers by the Cincinnati Bengals. He played in one game, completing 2 of 6 passes for 25 yards with one interception. He wasn't re-signed after the season.

In 1988, he was signed by the Chicago Bruisers of the Arena Football League after performing well at a tryout camp. Under head coach Perry Moss, he finished the season completing 172 of 323 passes for 2,304 yards with 49 touchdowns and 13 interceptions. He was named First-team All-Arena team at QB and was also named the league's Most Valuable Player. On November 29, 1988, he was signed as a free agent by the Chicago Bears to backup Jim Harbaugh, after Jim McMahon was placed on the injured reserve list and Mike Tomczak was out with a separated shoulder. He was active for two games as a backup quarterback. He wasn't re-signed after the season.

In 1989, the Bruisers suspended operations. During the shortened season, he was the league's top-ranked passer, posting 69 of 127 completions for 808 yards with 14 touchdowns and 5 interceptions.

In 1990, Bennett began the year with the Albany Firebirds. On May 14, he was traded to the Dallas Texans. He appeared in all 8 games where he led the team to the ArenaBowl IV. During the season, he completed 115 of 220 attempts for 1,149 yards, 24 touchdowns, and 15 interceptions. He was named second-team All-Arena.

In 1991, he was selected by the Sacramento Surge in the first round of the World League of American Football draft. He was a backup behind Mike Elkins and was released on April 9. In April, he was signed by the San Antonio Riders, where he was a backup behind Mike Johnson and Jason Garrett.

On June 5, 1991, he was signed by the Dallas Texans of the Arena Football League. On July 3, he was traded to the expansion Orlando Predators in exchange for defensive tackle Keith Williams, reuniting with head coach Perry Moss. He replaced starter Reggie Collier, finishing the season with 42 of 81 passes for 540 yards with 6 touchdowns and 2 interceptions.

In 1992, he completed 145 of 264 passes for 2,092 yards with 41 touchdowns and 10 interceptions. The greatest feat of his career the "Miracle Minute", a historic comeback in a game against the Detroit Drive on June 19. In that game, he threw two touchdown passes and two 2-point conversions in the final 49 seconds of the game, all to Barry Wagner. Wagner then got a game-winning safety, completing a comeback from a 32–42 deficit to a 50–49 win. Bennett led the Predators to the ArenaBowl VI, where they were beaten by the Drive.

In 1993, he completed 180 of 340 yards for 2,515 yards with 50 touchdowns and 10 interceptions. In 1994, he completed 166 of 245 passes for 2,211 yards with 45 touchdowns and 9 interceptions. In 1995, he completed 91 of 149 passes for 1,111 yards with 20 touchdowns and 7 interceptions. For both the 1993 and 1994 season, Bennett was named first-team All-Arena. He would also lead the Predators to a total of three ArenaBowls, losing all three.

For the 1996 season, Bennett played for the San Jose SaberCats, completing 26 of 55 passes for 376 yards with 4 touchdowns and 4 interceptions. In 1997, he played for the Portland Forest Dragons, completing 63 of 124 passes for 792 yards with 14 touchdowns and 6 interceptions. He retired at the end of the year after suffering a neck injury.

During his AFL playing career, he made five ArenaBowl appearances and was inducted into the Arena Football Hall of Fame on May 24, 2000. He also was inducted into the Predators Ring of Honor.

== Coaching career ==
In 1998, he was signed as an assistant coach by the Milwaukee Mustangs. In December 1998, he was named an assistant coach at Duke University. In three seasons as a head coach in the af2, Bennett has compiled a record of 36–18 (including playoffs). His win total is the third highest among active coaches and tenth best All-time. Bennett's coaching resume also includes stints as an assistant with the Florida Bobcats (AFL, 2001), the Greensboro Prowlers (af2, 2000), and the Milwaukee Mustangs (AFL, 1998).

Bennett built and led the Florida Firecats of the af2 to two ArenaCup championship games during the 2002 and 2004 seasons, winning the 2004 ArenaCup championship. In 2005, he transformed the Manchester Wolves from a 5–11 team in 2004 into the East Division champion in his first season. He guided the Wolves to a franchise-best 12-win season, finishing 12–5 overall. The team's season also included a 10-game win streak and a trip to the second round of the af2 playoffs.

Bennett was to be the head coach for the Orlando Fantasy during the 2010 season, but he decided that it wasn't a job he was interested in.

In 2011, he was the offensive coordinator of the Arena Football League's New Orleans VooDoo, but he was dismissed three games into the season. In 2012, he was named offensive coordinator of the Arena Football League's Orlando Predators.

He was named the head coach of the re-launched Orlando Predators in the National Arena League for the 2020 season. The 2020 season was cancelled due to the onset of the COVID-19 pandemic, but Bennett returned for the 2021 season where he led the team to 4–4 record and a playoff spot. He left the Predators after the season.
