= Dallas Texans (arena football) =

Arena football team

Logo

General information
- Founded: 1990
- Folded: 1993
- Headquartered: Reunion Arena in Dallas, Texas
- Colors: Brick, navy and white

Personnel
- Owners: Kent Kramer; Greg Gibson
- Head coach: Jerry Trice

Team history
- Dallas Texans (1990–1993)

Home fields
- Reunion Arena (1990–1993)

League / conference affiliations
- Arena Football League (1990–1993): American Conference (1993); Western (1992)

Championships
- Division championships: 1: 1992; Prior to 1992, the AFL did not have divisions

Playoff appearances (3)
- 1990, 1992, 1993

The Dallas Texans were an Arena football team based in Dallas, Texas. The Texans were founded in 1990 and were a member of the Arena Football League (AFL). The team played for four seasons, and were relatively successful, making the playoffs three out of four seasons. They played their home games in the Reunion Arena, which they shared with the Dallas Mavericks of the National Basketball Association.

== History ==
=== 1990 ===
In 1990, owner H. Lanier Richey brought the Arena Football League to the state of Texas for the first time. Richey named former Pittsburgh Steeler, Ernie Stautner as the Texans' first coach in franchise history. The Texans made a noise in May, when they traded 4 players to the Albany Firebirds, for former MVP Ben Bennett and former Ironman of the Year, Carl Aikens, Jr. Stautner lead the Texans to a 6–2 regular season record, and was named the AFL's Coach of the Year. The Texans made the ArenaBowl their first season of existence, falling to the Detroit Drive 51–27.

=== 1991 ===
In 1991, the Texans had to replace head coach Stautner (who had left for a job with the Denver Broncos), and did so by signing former Cowboys legend, Drew Pearson. Before the season began, the Texans traded Bennett to the Orlando Predators, after Bennett stated his displeasure with the Texans. The team replaced Bennett with former NFL running back, Alfred Jenkins. The Texans started off in the middle of the pack going 3–2 through the first 5 games, before finishing the season 1–4 in the final 5 games. Their 4–6 record was not enough to qualify for the playoffs.

=== 1992 ===
On February 21, 1992, Richey sold the franchise to Kent Kramer and Greg Gibson. Kramer replaced Pearson at head coach with Texas Tech assistant coach, John Paul Young. The Texans finished the season 5–5, winning the Western Division, but due to Kramer not anticipating a playoff home game, the Texans did not have the money in their budget to host a game and were forced to travel. The Texans traveled to Albany, New York to play the Firebirds, where they earned a 48–45 victory to advance to the 2nd round of the playoffs. The Texans would lose the following week to the eventual champion, the Detroit Drive.

=== 1993 ===
In 1993, Young left the Texans to take a job as the linebackers coach with the Denver Broncos. Kramer hired former Drive and Firebirds assistant, Jerry Trice to be the team's new head coach. The Texans finished the season a disappointing 3–9, but still qualified for the playoffs, losing in the first round. In October, the Texans were dropped from the AFL due to being unable to meeting financial requirements.

=== Future of AFL in Dallas ===
In 2000, Jerry Jones was awarded an expansion franchise in Dallas. Jones was considering using the nickname "Texans" but ultimately choose the Dallas Desperados, playing from 2002 to 2008. The most recent (but now also defunct) Dallas Vigilantes franchise was an expansion team unrelated to either the Texans or Desperados.

=== Season-by-season results ===
Season records
Season	W	L	T	Finish	Playoff results
1990	6	2	0	2nd	Won Semifinals (Denver 26–25); Lost ArenaBowl IV (Detroit 51–27)
1991	4	6	0	6th	--
1992	5	5	0	1st Western	Won Week 1 (Albany 48–45); Lost Week 2 (Detroit 57–14)
1993	3	9	0	3rd AC	Lost Week 1 (Detroit 51–6)
Totals	20	24	0	(including playoffs)	

== Notable players ==
=== Arena Football League Hall of Famers ===
Dallas Texans Hall of Famers
No.	Name	Inducted	Position(s)	Tenure
5	Ben Bennett	2000	QB	1990
84	Carl Aikens, Jr.	2000	WR/DB	1990–1991

=== All-Arena players ===
The following Texans players were named to All-Arena Teams:

- QB Ben Bennett (1), Todd Hammel (1)
- FB/LB Mitchell Ward (1)
- WR/DB Carl Aikens, Jr. (1), Sam Moore (1), Gary Compton (1), Tyrone Thurman (1)
- WR/LB Sam Moore (1)

== Head coaches ==
Name	Term	Regular season				Playoffs		Awards
Name	Term	W	L	T	Win%	W	L	Awards
Ernie Stautner	1990	6	2	0	.750	1	1	1990 AFL Coach of the Year
Drew Pearson	1991	4	6	0	.400	0	0	
John Paul Young	1992	5	5	0	.500	1	1	
Jerry Trice	1993	3	9	0	.250	0	1	

== Notes ==
- The team appeared on the game EA Sports Arena Football as a hidden bonus team, as well as the sequel Arena Football: Road to Glory.
