= 1990 Arena Football League season =

- League: Arena Football League
- Sport: Arena football
- Duration: June 8, 1990 – July 28, 1990

Regular season
- Season champions: Detroit Drive
- Season MVP: Art Schlichter, DET

League postseason
- 1 vs 4 Semifinals champions: Detroit Drive
- 1 vs 4 Semifinals runners-up: Pittsburgh Gladiators
- 2 vs 3 Semifinals champions: Dallas Texans
- 2 vs 3 Semifinals runners-up: Denver Dynamite

ArenaBowl IV
- Champions: Detroit Drive
- Runners-up: Dallas Texans
- Finals MVP: Art Schlichter, DET

AFL seasons
- ← 1989 1991 →

AFL teams

The 1990 Arena Football League season was the fourth season of the Arena Football League (AFL). The league champions were the Detroit Drive, who defeated the Dallas Texans in ArenaBowl IV.

== Standings ==
1990 Arena Football League standings
Team	W	L	T	PCT	PF	PA	PF (Avg.)	PA (Avg.)	STK
xy-Detroit Drive	6	2	0	.750	326	215	40.7	26.9	W 2
x-Dallas Texans	6	2	0	.750	299	308	37.4	38.5	W 4
x-Denver Dynamite	4	4	0	.500	283	267	35.4	33.4	L 3
x-Pittsburgh Gladiators	3	5	0	.375	289	287	36.1	35.9	L 1
Albany Firebirds	3	5	0	.375	188	268	23.5	33.5	W 1
Washington Commandos	2	6	0	.250	244	284	30.5	35.5	L 2

y – clinched regular-season title

x – clinched playoff spot

== Playoffs ==
Semifinals
1	Detroit	61
4	Pittsburgh	30
2	Dallas	26
3	Denver	25

ArenaBowl IV
1	Detroit	51
2	Dallas	27

== Awards and honors ==
=== Regular season awards ===
Award	Winner	Position	Team
Most Valuable Player	Art Schlichter	Quarterback	Detroit Drive
Ironman of the Year	Thomas Monroe	Wide Receiver/Defensive Back	Pittsburgh Gladiators
Kicker of the Year	Novo Bojovic	Kicker	Detroit Drive
Coach of the Year	Ernie Stautner	Head coach	Dallas Texans

=== All-Arena team ===
Position	First team	Second team
Quarterback	Art Schlichter, Detroit	Ben Bennett, Dallas
Fullback/Linebacker	Mitchell Ward, Dallas	Alvin Rettig, Detroit
Wide receiver/Defensive back	Thomas Monroe, Pittsburgh; Gary Mullen, Detroit; Carl Aikens, Jr., Dallas	Julius Dawkins, Pittsburgh; Reggie Smith, Albany; Chris Armstrong, Washington
Offensive specialist/Kick returner	Reggie Smith, Albany	Gary Mullen, Detroit
Offensive lineman/Defensive lineman	Sylvester Bembery, Albany; Kevin Murphy, Albany; Quinton Knight, Denver	Chuck Harris, Washington; Keith Browner, Pittsburgh; Greg Orton, Detroit; Mitch Young, Denver
Defensive specialist	Durwood Roquemore, Albany	Tate Randle, Detroit
Kicker	Novo Bojovic, Detroit	Gary Gussman, Albany

== Team notes ==
# of teams	Expansion teams	Folded teams	Suspended teams	Teams returning from previous season	Teams returning after hiatus	Relocated teams	Name changes
6	Dallas Texans; Albany Firebirds	Chicago Bruisers		Pittsburgh Gladiators; Detroit Drive; Denver Dynamite; Washington Commandos		Maryland → Washington Commandos	
