= Detroit Drive =

Arena football team

Logo

General information
- Founded: 1988
- Folded: 1994
- Headquartered: Worcester Centrum in Worcester, Massachusetts

Personnel
- Head coach: Don Strock

Team history
- Detroit Drive (1988–1993); Massachusetts Marauders (1994)

Home fields
- Joe Louis Arena (1988–1993); Worcester Centrum (1994)

League / conference affiliations
- Arena Football League (1988–1994): Central (1988–1993); East (1994)

Championships
- League championships: 4; 1988, 1989, 1990, 1992
- Conference championships: 4: 1989, 1990, 1991, 1993; Prior to 2005, the AFL did not have conference championship games
- Division championships: 1: Central: 1992

Playoff appearances (7)
- 1988, 1989, 1990, 1991, 1992, 1993, 1994

The Detroit Drive were a professional arena football team that was based in Detroit, Michigan. They were a member of the Arena Football League (AFL) from 1988 to 1994. The team was established in Detroit in 1988 and was a member of the AFL in 1988 and in all subsequent years through 1993. The club then moved to Worcester, Massachusetts, in 1994 and played one season as the Massachusetts Marauders.

The franchise has four AFL championships, all while it was based in Detroit. The first three occurred in back-to-back-to-back fashion from 1988 to 1990, and the final one occurred in 1992.

== History ==
=== Detroit Drive (1988–1993) ===
==== Expansion (1988) ====
In 1987, Mike Ilitch began negotiations with the Arena Football League (AFL), to join for the 1988 season. The Drive began play in 1988 as a member of the AFL. Under head coach Tim Marcum, the Drive finished the regular season 9–3 after starting the season 2–3. Two of the Drive's losses came at the hands of the Chicago Bruisers, who finished the season with one loss. The Drive would get a chance at revenge when they advanced to ArenaBowl II against the Bruisers, and they were able to defeat the Bruisers 24–13.

==== Back-to-back (1989) ====
With the AFL suspending operations prior to the 1989 season, the league was revived and decided to play a short season, but that forced the Drive to begin the 1989 season by replacing quarterback Rich Ingold, who didn't want to take the pay cut of the short season. The Drive won ArenaBowl III 39–26 over the Pittsburgh Gladiators.

==== 3-peat (1990) ====
Head Coach Tim Marcum stepped away from the Drive in 1990 to join the University of Florida's football staff, and was replaced by Perry Moss. The Drive bolstered their offense by signing quarterback Art Schlichter (Who would become the AFL's MVP in 1990). Moss lead the Drive to a 6–2 regular season record and they remained a dominant force, leading the going to ArenaBowl IV, where they defeated the Dallas Texans 51–27.

==== The return of Marcum (1991) ====
Marcum returned to coach the Drive in 1991. The Drive didn't miss a beat, finishing with the best record in the league for the fourth season in a row. However, despite hosting ArenaBowl '91, they were defeated by the Tampa Bay Storm, ending their three-year reign as league champions.

==== A fourth title (1992) ====
The Drive traded Schlichter to the expansion Cincinnati Rockers, partly because the league believed that since he'd grown up in the area and starred at Ohio State, he'd lend the new franchise needed credibility. However, another factor was the compulsive gambling that had derailed his NFL career almost a decade earlier. Despite Ilitch's efforts to keep Schlichter on the straight and narrow, by the end of 1991 it was no longer safe for Schlichter to stay in Detroit.

In 1992, the Drive played in the Northern Division. The Drive won ArenaBowl VI, claiming their fourth title in five seasons.

==== Final season in Detroit (1993) ====
Following the 1992 season, Ilitch purchased the Detroit Tigers of Major League Baseball and Vitto was transferred to the Tigers front office. Marcum assumed GM duties for 1993 and led the team to its final Arena Bowl. Ilitch sold the Drive so that they would not compete with the Tigers for attendance. Ilitch still claims that he only kept the Drive because they were constant contenders.

The Drive had, arguably, the best management team in the league. Owner Mike Ilitch, General Manager Gary Vitto, and Head Coach Tim Marcum are all in the AFL Hall of Fame.

=== Massachusetts Marauders (1994) ===
Massachusetts Marauders logo

The new owners moved the team to Worcester, Massachusetts as the Massachusetts Marauders, playing their home games at the Worcester Centrum, but folded after going 8–4 and making the semifinals in their first and only season. Whereas the Drive averaged over 14,000 fans a game during their six seasons in Detroit, the Marauders averaged less than 7,400 a game. Nearly three years after the Marauders folded, Dan DeVos won their assets in bankruptcy court and used them to launch the Grand Rapids Rampage, who played until 2008.

=== Later AFL in Detroit ===
Detroit later received a second Arena Football team, the Detroit Fury. The Fury played from 2001 to 2004 in The Palace of Auburn Hills and were co-owned by William Davidson, owner of the Detroit Pistons and William Clay Ford, Jr., son of the owner of the Detroit Lions. The Fury were never as successful as the Drive, compiling a 22–41 record and averaging 8,152 fans per game before they folded in 2004.

While the Drive's history was relatively brief, they had an inarguable importance in the history of Arena Football, with ArenaBowl trips every year of their existence, and creating the first dynasty in the Arena Football League.

== Notable players ==
=== Arena Football League Hall of Famers ===
Detroit Drive Hall of Famers
No.	Name	Year inducted	Position(s)	Years w/ Drive
88	John Corker	2002	OL/DL	1988–1993
98	Dwayne Dixon	1998	WR/LB	1988–1991
–	Mike Ilitch	2002	Owner	1988–1993
27	George LaFrance	2011	WR/DB	1988–1993
–	Tim Marcum	1998	Head Coach	1988–1989, 1991–1993
–	Perry Moss	2000	Head Coach	1990
1	Gary Mullen	1998	WR/DB	1989–1992
29, 35	Tate Randle	1998	WR/LB	1988, 1990–1992
44	Alvin Rettig	1998	FB/LB	1988–1993
62	Jon Roehlk	1999	OL/DL	1988–1993
–	Gary Vitto	1999	General Manager	1988–1993

=== Individual awards ===
AFL MVP
Season	Player	Position
1989	George LaFrance	WR/DB
1990	Art Schlichter	QB
1991	George LaFrance	OS/KR

Ironman of the Year
Season	Player	Position
1988	Dwayne Dixon	WR/DB

Kicker of the Year
Season	Player	Position
1990	Novo Bojovic	K

Lineman of the Year
Season	Player	Position
1991	John Corker	OL/DL

=== All-Arena players ===
The following Drive/Marauders players were named to All-Arena Teams:

- QB Art Schlichter (2)
- FB/LB Walter Holman (1), Lynn Bradford (1), Alvin Rettig (3), Broderick Sargent (1), Tony Burse (1)
- WR/DB Dwayne Dixon (1), George LaFrance (2), Gary Mullen (2), Michael Clark (1)
- WR/LB Niu Sale (1)
- OL/DL Jon Roehlk (2), Reggie Mathis (1), Greg Orton (1), John Corker (1), Flint Fleming (2), Danny Lockett (2), Ralph Jarvis (1)
- DS Nate Miller (1), Tate Randle (2), Rod McSwain (1), Riley Ware (1)
- OS/KR Gary Mullen (1), George LaFrance (1)
- K Novo Bojovic (2)

== Head coaches ==
Name	Term	Regular season				Playoffs		Awards	Reference
Name	Term	W	L	T	Win%	W	L	Awards	Reference
Tim Marcum	1988–1989, 1991–1993	40	8	0	.833	10	2		
Perry Moss	1990	6	2	0	.750	2	0		
Don Strock	1994	8	4	0	.667	1	1		

== Video games ==
The Drive and Marauders both appeared on the game EA Sports Arena Football as hidden bonus teams.

== Season-by-season ==
ArenaBowl champions	ArenaBowl appearance	Division champions	Playoff berth

Season	League	Conference	Division	Regular season			Postseason results
Season	League	Conference	Division	Finish	Wins	Losses	Postseason results
Detroit Drive
1988	AFL	—	—	2nd	9	3	Won Semifinals (Pittsburgh) 34–25; Won ArenaBowl II (Chicago) 24–13
1989	AFL	—	—	1st	3	1	Won Semifinals (Chicago) 43–10; Won ArenaBowl III (Pittsburgh) 39–26
1990	AFL	—	—	1st	6	2	Won Semifinals (Pittsburgh) 64–30; Won ArenaBowl IV (Dallas) 51–27
1991	AFL	—	—	1st	9	1	Won Semifinals (Albany) 37–35; Lost ArenaBowl V (Tampa Bay) 48–42
1992	AFL	—	Northern	1st	8	2	Won Quarterfinals (Sacramento) 48–23; Won Semifinals (Dallas) 57–14; Won ArenaBowl VI (Orlando) 56–38
1993	AFL	American	—	1st	11	1	Won Quarterfinals (Dallas) 51–6; Won Semifinals (Arizona) 38–34; Lost ArenaBowl VII (Tampa Bay) 51–31
Massachusetts Marauders
1994	AFL	American	—	3rd	8	4	Won Quarterfinals (Tampa Bay) 58–51; Lost Semifinals (Orlando) 51–42
Total					54	14	(includes only regular season)
Total					13	3	(includes only the postseason)
Total					67	17	(includes both regular season and postseason)
