= ArenaBowl IV =

Dallas Texans (2nd)	Detroit Drive (1st)
27	51
	1	2	3	4	Total
DAL	0	14	0	13	27
DET	14	17	13	7	51
- Date: August 11, 1990
- Stadium: Joe Louis Arena; Detroit, Michigan
- MVP: Art Schlichter, QB, Detroit: Alvin Rettig, FB/LB, Detroit (Ironman of the Game)
- Attendance: 19,875
- Winning coach: Perry Moss
- Losing coach: Ernie Stautner

TV in the United States
- Network: Prime Network
- Announcers: Dave Enet, Howard Balzer, Jim Grabowski

Arena Bowl '90 (or Arena Bowl IV) was the Arena Football League's fourth Arena Bowl. The game featured the #2 Dallas Texans against the #1 Detroit Drive. Both teams finished their seasons at 6-2, yet the Drive led in points for (326-299) and points against (215-308).

== Game summary ==
In the first quarter, Detroit drew first blood with Quarterback Art Schlichter getting a two-yard and a five-yard touchdown runs on Quarterback sneaks.

In the second quarter, the Drive continued to score, with FB/LB Alvin Rettig getting a one-yard touchdown run and catching an 11-yard touchdown pass from Schlichter. Afterwards, the Texans managed to get on the board with FB/LB Mitchell Ward getting a one-yard touchdown run, while Quarterback Ben Bennett completed a six-yard touchdown pass to WR/DB Aatron Kenney. However, the Drive responded with Kicker Novo Bojovic nailing a 42-yard field goal to end the half.

In the third quarter, Detroit continued its first half domination with Schlichter getting another one-yard touchdown run, while completing a 37-yard touchdown pass to WR/DB Gary Mullen.

In the fourth quarter, Dallas tried to respond with Ward getting a one-yard touchdown run and FB/LB Alvin Blackmon getting a three-yard touchdown run, yet the Drive wrapped the game up with Schlichter's two-yard touchdown run.

With the win, the Detroit Drive became the first team to achieve a three-peat, with three-straight ArenaBowl wins.

== Scoring summary ==
1st Quarter

- DET - Schlichter 2 run (Bojovic kick)
- DET - interception Grymes, Schlichter 5 run (Bojovic kick)

2nd Quarter

- DET - Rettig 1 run (Bojovic kick)
- DET - Rettig 11 pass from Schlichter (Bojovic kick)
- DAL - Ward 1 run (Morales kick)
- DAL - Kenney 6 pass from Bennett (Morales kick)
- DET - FG Bojovic 42

3rd Quarter

- DET - Schlichter 1 run (Bojovic kick)
- DET - Mullen 37 pass from Schlichter (Bojovic kick failed)

4th Quarter

- DAL - Ward 1 run (Morales kick)
- DAL - Blackmon 3 run (Bennett pass failed)
- DET - Schlichter 2 run (Bojovic kick)
