= 1992 Detroit Drive season =

Arena football team season

- Head coach: Tim Marcum
- Home stadium: Joe Louis Arena

Results
- Record: 8–2
- Division place: 1st
- Playoffs: Won 1st Round (Attack) 48–23; Won Semi-Finals (Texans) 57–14; Won ArenaBowl VI (Predators) 56–38

The 1992 Detroit Drive season was the fifth season for the Drive. They finished the regular season 8–2.

The Drive defeated the Orlando Predators in ArenaBowl VI.

== Regular season ==
=== Schedule ===
Week	Date	Opponent	Results		Game site
Week	Date	Opponent	Final score	Team record	Game site
1	May 30	at Cincinnati Rockers	L 34–37	0–1	Riverfront Coliseum
2	June 6	at Albany Firebirds	W 33–23	1–1	Knickerbocker Arena
3	June 12	Cincinnati Rockers	W 79–36	2–1	Joe Louis Arena
4	June 19	Orlando Predators	L 49–50	2–2	Joe Louis Arena
5	June 27	at New Orleans Night	W 66–41	3–2	Louisiana Superdome
6	July 2	at Cleveland Thunderbolts	W 47–36	4–2	Richfield Coliseum
7	July 10	Albany Firebirds	W 58–34	5–2	Joe Louis Arena
8	July 17	Sacramento Attack	W 31–10	6–2	Joe Louis Arena
9	July 24	Cleveland Thunderbolts	W 38–20	7–2	Joe Louis Arena
10	August 1	at San Antonio Force	W 62–27	8–2	HemisFair Arena

=== Standings ===
1992 Arena Football League standings
Team	W	L	T	PCT	PF	PA	PF (Avg.)	PA (Avg.)	STK
Southern Division
xyz-Orlando Predators	9	1	0	.900	484	281	48.4	28.1	W 9
x-Tampa Bay Storm	9	1	0	.900	472	354	47.2	35.4	W 4
Charlotte Rage	3	7	0	.300	357	320	35.7	32	L 2
New Orleans Night	0	10	0	.000	258	491	25.8	49.1	L 10
Northern Division
xy-Detroit Drive	8	2	0	.800	497	314	49.7	31.4	W 6
x-Cincinnati Rockers	7	3	0	.700	451	350	45.1	35	L 1
x-Albany Firebirds	5	5	0	.500	422	416	42.2	41.6	L 4
x-Cleveland Thunderbolts	4	6	0	.400	311	362	31.1	36.2	W 1
Western Division
xy-Dallas Texans	5	5	0	.500	354	388	35.4	38.8	W 2
x-Sacramento Attack	4	6	0	.400	354	395	35.4	39.5	W 1
Arizona Rattlers	4	6	0	.400	324	420	32.4	42	L 1
San Antonio Force	2	8	0	.200	268	461	26.8	46.1	L 2

z – clinched homefield advantage

y – clinched division title

x – clinched playoff spot

== Playoffs ==
Round	Date	Opponent	Results		Game site
Round	Date	Opponent	Final score	Team record	Game site
1st	August 7	Sacramento Attack	W 48–23	1–0	Joe Louis Arena
Semi-finals	August 14	Dallas Texans	W 57–14	2–0	Joe Louis Arena
ArenaBowl VI	August 22	at Orlando Predators	W 56–38	3–0	Orlando Arena

== Roster ==
1992 Detroit Drive roster
Quarterbacks: -- Ron Adams; -- Gilbert Renfroe; Wide Receivers/Defensive Backs: -- Kenneth Harper; -- Darek Holloway; -- Mark Guy; 27 George LaFrance; -- Andre Langley; -- Rod McSwain; 1 Gary Mullen; -- B. T. Thompson	Fullbacks/Linebackers: 44 Alvin Rettig; -- Broderick Sargent; Offensive Linemen/Defensive Linemen: 88 John Corker; -- Flint Fleming; -- Erwin Grabisna; -- William Harris; -- Quinton Knight; 62 Jon Roehlk; -- Lynn Rowland; -- Robert Smith	Wide Receivers/Linebackers: 80 Paul Jokisch; 33 Will McClay; 29 Tate Randle; Kickers: 3 Novo Bojovic; -- John Langeloh; Rookies in italics Roster updated March 29, 2013; 25 Active, 0 Inactive, 0 PS → More rosters

== Awards ==
Position	Player	Award	All-Arena team
General Manager	Gary Vitto	President's Award	–
Fullback/Linebacker	Alvin Rettig	none	1st
