= 1992 San Antonio Force season =

Arena Football League team season

- Owner: Red McCombs
- Head coach: Dick Nolan
- Home stadium: HemisFair Arena

Results
- Record: 2–8
- Division place: 4th
- Playoffs: Did not qualify

The 1992 San Antonio Force season was the first and only season. The Force finished 2–8 and failed to qualify for the playoffs. The Force's 0–50 loss in Week 3 to the Orlando Predators was the only shutout in the Arena Football League's 32-season history.

== Regular season ==
=== Schedule ===
Week	Date	Opponent	Results		Game site
Week	Date	Opponent	Final score	Team record	Game site
1	May 30	at Cleveland Thunderbolts	L 34–36	0–1	Richfield Coliseum
2	June 6	Arizona Rattlers	W 43–29	1–1	HemisFair Arena
3	June 13	at Orlando Predators	L 0–50	1–2	Orlando Arena
4	June 20	Sacramento Attack	L 15–38	1–3	HemisFair Arena
5	June 27	Cincinnati Rockers	L 7–40	1–4	HemisFair Arena
6	July 6	at Sacramento Attack	L 35–65	1–5	Power Balance Pavilion
7	July 11	at Dallas Texans	L 35–47	1–6	Reunion Arena
8	July 18	Dallas Texans	W 41–40	2–6	HemisFair Arena
9	July 25	at Arizona Rattlers	L 31–54	2–7	America West Arena
10	August 1	Detroit Drive	L 27–62	2–8	HemisFair Arena

=== Standings ===
1992 Arena Football League standings
Team	W	L	T	PCT	PF	PA	PF (Avg.)	PA (Avg.)	STK
Southern Division
xyz-Orlando Predators	9	1	0	.900	484	281	48.4	28.1	W 9
x-Tampa Bay Storm	9	1	0	.900	472	354	47.2	35.4	W 4
Charlotte Rage	3	7	0	.300	357	320	35.7	32	L 2
New Orleans Night	0	10	0	.000	258	491	25.8	49.1	L 10
Northern Division
xy-Detroit Drive	8	2	0	.800	497	314	49.7	31.4	W 6
x-Cincinnati Rockers	7	3	0	.700	451	350	45.1	35	L 1
x-Albany Firebirds	5	5	0	.500	422	416	42.2	41.6	L 4
x-Cleveland Thunderbolts	4	6	0	.400	311	362	31.1	36.2	W 1
Western Division
xy-Dallas Texans	5	5	0	.500	354	388	35.4	38.8	W 2
x-Sacramento Attack	4	6	0	.400	354	395	35.4	39.5	W 1
Arizona Rattlers	4	6	0	.400	324	420	32.4	42	L 1
San Antonio Force	2	8	0	.200	268	461	26.8	46.1	L 2

z – clinched homefield advantage

y – clinched division title

x – clinched playoff spot

== Roster ==
1992 San Antonio Force roster
Quarterbacks: -- Ken Lutz; -- Jason Palumbis; Wide Receivers/Defensive Backs: -- Jorrick Battle; -- James Harvey; -- Alvin Horn; -- Steve Shelly; -- John Simpson; -- Warren Stewart; -- Charlie Thompson	Fullbacks/Linebackers: -- Smiley Elmore; -- James Greene; Offensive Linemen/Defensive Linemen: -- David Caldwell; -- Keithen DeGrate; -- Duane Duncum; -- Tracy Gordon; -- Dave Opfar; -- Rodney Serpa; -- Doug Robb; -- Greg Ross; -- Dante Williams	Wide Receiver/Linebackers: -- Anthony Cooney; -- Anthony Faldyn; -- Victor Scott; -- Steve Stutsman; Kickers: -- Matt Frantz; -- Tim Lasher; -- Scott Segrist; Rookies in italics Roster updated March 26, 2013; 27 Active, 0 Inactive, 0 PS → More rosters
