= 1992 Sacramento Attack season =

Arena Football Franchise Season

- Head coach: Joe Kapp
- Home stadium: ARCO Arena

Results
- Record: 4–6
- Division place: 2nd
- Playoffs: Lost 1st Round (Drive) 23–48

The 1992 Sacramento Attack season was the first season for the Arena football franchise, and its only season in Sacramento, California. The Attack finished 4–6 and lost in the playoffs to the Detroit Drive. The franchise was originally going to be located in Los Angeles, California and be called the Los Angeles Wings, but the franchise never came into existence in Los Angeles, and moved to Sacramento as the Attack.

== Regular season ==
=== Schedule ===
Week	Date	Opponent	Results		Game site
Week	Date	Opponent	Final score	Team record	Game site
1	May 29	at Dallas Texans	L 27–49	0–1	Reunion Arena
2	June 4	Orlando Predators	L 47–58	0–2	ARCO Arena
3	June 13	at Arizona Rattlers	L 36–51	0–3	America West Arena
4	June 20	at San Antonio Force	W 38–15	1–3	HemisFair Arena
5	June 26	Arizona Rattlers	W 35–16	2–3	ARCO Arena
6	July 6	San Antonio Force	W 65–35	3–3	ARCO Arena
7	July 10	at Charlotte Rage	L 3–51	3–4	Charlotte Coliseum
8	July 17	at Detroit Drive	L 10–31	3–5	Joe Louis Arena
9	July 23	Dallas Texans	L 40–50	3–6	ARCO Arena
10	July 30	Cincinnati Rockers	W 55–48 (OT)	4–6	ARCO Arena

=== Standings ===
1992 Arena Football League standings
Team	W	L	T	PCT	PF	PA	PF (Avg.)	PA (Avg.)	STK
Southern Division
xyz-Orlando Predators	9	1	0	.900	484	281	48.4	28.1	W 9
x-Tampa Bay Storm	9	1	0	.900	472	354	47.2	35.4	W 4
Charlotte Rage	3	7	0	.300	357	320	35.7	32	L 2
New Orleans Night	0	10	0	.000	258	491	25.8	49.1	L 10
Northern Division
xy-Detroit Drive	8	2	0	.800	497	314	49.7	31.4	W 6
x-Cincinnati Rockers	7	3	0	.700	451	350	45.1	35	L 1
x-Albany Firebirds	5	5	0	.500	422	416	42.2	41.6	L 4
x-Cleveland Thunderbolts	4	6	0	.400	311	362	31.1	36.2	W 1
Western Division
xy-Dallas Texans	5	5	0	.500	354	388	35.4	38.8	W 2
x-Sacramento Attack	4	6	0	.400	354	395	35.4	39.5	W 1
Arizona Rattlers	4	6	0	.400	324	420	32.4	42	L 1
San Antonio Force	2	8	0	.200	268	461	26.8	46.1	L 2

z – clinched homefield advantage

y – clinched division title

x – clinched playoff spot

== Playoffs ==
Round	Date	Opponent	Results		Game site
Round	Date	Opponent	Final score	Team record	Game site
1st	August 7	at Detroit Drive	L 23–48	0–1	Joe Louis Arena

== Roster ==
1992 Sacramento Attack roster
Quarterbacks: -- A. Bebus; -- Frankie DeBusk; 7 Mike Hold, Jr.; -- Chris Parker; Wide Receivers/Defensive Backs: -- Wayne Adkins; 27 Wayne Coffey; -- Charlie Collins; -- Roy Dairy; -- Darrell Philon; 34 Niu Sale; -- Alvin Williams	Fullbacks/Linebackers: 3 Marshall Foreman; -- Steve Jones; Offensive Linemen/Defensive Linemen: -- Jim Bishop; -- George Fua; -- Aualofa Ili, Jr.; -- Joe March; -- Gary McCummings; 89 Jon Norris; -- Alo Sila; 55 Jim Spady; 50 Mitch Young	Wide Receiver/Linebackers: 88 Richard Ane; -- Willie Cannon; -- Zeph Lee; -- Richard Rodgers; -- Ken Sale; -- Bart Schuchts; Defensive Specialist: 10 Pat Gregory; Kickers: -- Kevin Greene; Rookies in italics Roster updated April 4, 2013; 30 Active, 0 Inactive, 0 PS → More rosters

== Awards ==
Position	Player	Award	All-Arena team
Offensive/Defensive Lineman	Alo Sila	none	1st
