= 1992 Orlando Predators season =

Arena Football League team season

- Head coach: Perry Moss
- Home stadium: Orlando Arena

Results
- Record: 9–1
- Division place: 1st
- Playoffs: Won 1st Round (Thunderbolts) 50–12; Won Semi-Finals (Storm) 24-21 (OT); Lost ArenaBowl VI (Drive) 38-56

The 1992 Orlando Predators season was the 2nd season for the franchise. They went 9–1 and lost ArenaBowl VI to the Detroit Drive.

== Regular season ==
=== Schedule ===
Week	Date	Opponent	Results		Game site
Week	Date	Opponent	Final score	Team record	Game site
1	May 29	Tampa Bay Storm	L 32–39	0–1	Orlando Arena
2	June 4	at Sacramento Attack	W 58–47	1–1	ARCO Arena
3	June 13	San Antonio Force	W 50–0	2–1	Orlando Arena
4	June 19	at Detroit Drive	W 50–49	3–1	Joe Louis Arena
	June 27	Charlotte Rage	W 29–26	4–1	Orlando Arena
6	July 2	at Tampa Bay Storm	W 48–33	5–1	Florida Suncoast Dome
7	July 11	at New Orleans Night	W 45–20	6–1	Louisiana Superdome
8	July 17	Arizona Rattlers	W 71–21	7–1	Orlando Arena
9	July 24	at Charlotte Rage	W 39–38	8–1	Charlotte Coliseum
10	July 31	New Orleans Night	W 62–8	9–1	Orlando Arena

=== Standings ===
1992 Arena Football League standings
Team	W	L	T	PCT	PF	PA	PF (Avg.)	PA (Avg.)	STK
Southern Division
xyz-Orlando Predators	9	1	0	.900	484	281	48.4	28.1	W 9
x-Tampa Bay Storm	9	1	0	.900	472	354	47.2	35.4	W 4
Charlotte Rage	3	7	0	.300	357	320	35.7	32	L 2
New Orleans Night	0	10	0	.000	258	491	25.8	49.1	L 10
Northern Division
xy-Detroit Drive	8	2	0	.800	497	314	49.7	31.4	W 6
x-Cincinnati Rockers	7	3	0	.700	451	350	45.1	35	L 1
x-Albany Firebirds	5	5	0	.500	422	416	42.2	41.6	L 4
x-Cleveland Thunderbolts	4	6	0	.400	311	362	31.1	36.2	W 1
Western Division
xy-Dallas Texans	5	5	0	.500	354	388	35.4	38.8	W 2
x-Sacramento Attack	4	6	0	.400	354	395	35.4	39.5	W 1
Arizona Rattlers	4	6	0	.400	324	420	32.4	42	L 1
San Antonio Force	2	8	0	.200	268	461	26.8	46.1	L 2

z – clinched homefield advantage

y – clinched division title

x – clinched playoff spot

== Playoffs ==
Round	Date	Opponent	Results		Game site
Round	Date	Opponent	Final score	Team record	Game site
1st	August 7	Cleveland Thunderbolts	W 50–12	1–0	Orlando Arena
Semi-finals	August 15	Tampa Bay Storm	W 24–21 (OT)	2–0	Orlando Arena
ArenaBowl VI	August 22	Detroit Drive	L 38–56	2–1	Orlando Arena

== Roster ==
1992 Orlando Predators roster
Quarterbacks: 10 Bryan Brock; 5 Ben Bennett; Wide Receivers/Defensive Backs: 84 Carl Aikens, Jr.; -- Kevin Grisby; -- Lee McCormick; -- Eugene Napoleon; -- Duane Nash; 29 Durwood Roquemore; 26 Tony Scott; 82 Barry Wagner; -- Herkie Walls	Fullbacks/linebackers: -- Jerry Odom; -- Reginald Warnsley; 33 Bill Stewart; Offensive Linemen/Defensive Linemen: -- Harry Brown; 78 Webbie Burnett; -- Jason Kuipers; -- Bubba Metts; 50 Curt Mull; -- Jeff Roth; 77 Rusty Russell; -- Charles Tobias	Wide Receivers/linebackers: -- Orsorio Jackson; -- Bryan Moore; Kickers: 17 Jorge Cimadevilla; Rookies in italics Roster updated March 27, 2013; 25 Active, 0 Inactive, 0 PS → More rosters

== Awards ==
Position	Player	Award	All-Arena team
Wide Receiver/Defensive Back	Barry Wagner	Ironman of the Year	1st
Head coach	Perry Moss	Coach of the Year	–
Executive	Eric Leins	Executive of the Year	–
Defensive specialist	Durwood Roquemore	–	1st
Kicker	Jorge Cimadevilla	–	1st
