= Mark Guy =

American gridiron football player (born 1964)

No. 9, 6
- Position: Wide receiver

Personal information
- Born: January 28, 1964 (age 62); Olive Branch, Mississippi, U.S.
- Listed height: 5 ft 9 in (1.75 m)
- Listed weight: 170 lb (77 kg)

Career information
- College: Tennessee–Martin

Career history
- 1989–1990: Saskatchewan Roughriders
- 1991: Calgary Stampeders
- 1992: Detroit Drive

Awards and highlights
- Grey Cup champion (1989); ArenaBowl champion (1992)
- Stats at ArenaFan.com

Mark Guy (born January 28, 1964) is an American former professional football wide receiver who played three seasons in the Canadian Football League (CFL) with the Saskatchewan Roughriders and Calgary Stampeders. He played college football at University of Tennessee at Martin. He was also a member of the Detroit Drive of the Arena Football League (AFL).

== Early life ==
Mark Guy was born on January 28, 1964 in Olive Branch, Mississippi.

== Professional career ==
Guy signed with the Saskatchewan Roughriders in March 1989. He played in seven games for the Roughriders during the 1989 season, catching seven passes for 144 yards and one touchdown. He also recorded four receptions for 100 yards in the 77th Grey Cup, a 43-40 win over the Hamilton Tiger-Cats on November 26, 1989. Guy totaled 29 receptions for 328 yards and two touchdowns in twelve games for the Roughriders in 1990. He was later released by the team.

Guy was then signed by the Calgary Stampeders in June 1991. He caught 16 passes for 264 yards and one touchdown in seven games for the team during the 1991 season. He also had 29 punt returns for 401 yards.

On July 1, 1992, the Detroit Free Press reported that Guy had signed with the Detroit Drive. He recorded three receptions for 29 yards for the team during the 1992 season. He also accumulated four tackles, three pass breakups and one fumble recovery that was returned for a touchdown. The Drive won ArenaBowl VI against the Orlando Predators by a score of 56-38 on August 22, 1992.
