= Earl Harvey =

American football player (born 1967)

Profile
- Positions: Quarterback, wide receiver, linebacker

Personal information
- Born: June 26, 1967 (age 59)
- Listed height: 6 ft 2 in (1.88 m)
- Listed weight: 210 lb (95 kg)

Career information
- High school: Douglas Byrd (Fayetteville, North Carolina)
- College: North Carolina Central (1985–1988)
- NFL draft: 1989: undrafted

Career history
- Charlotte Barons (1989); Triangle Cardinals (1989); New Orleans Night (1991); San Antonio Force (1992); Fayetteville Guard (2008)

Awards and highlights
- 4× First-team All-CIAA (1985–1988)
- Stats at ArenaFan.com

James Earl "Air" Harvey (born June 26, 1967) is an American former football player. As the quarterback for North Carolina Central University during the 1980s, he set NCAA Division II career records with 10,621 passing yards, 86 touchdown passes, and 10,667 yards of total offense. His team reached the quarterfinals of the 1988 NCAA Division II Football Championship. That year, he was in the top three for the Harlon Hill Trophy.

He played minor league football in 1989 before joining the Arena Football League (AFL) in 1991. He played a year each with the New Orleans Night and San Antonio Force, spending time at wide receiver, linebacker, and quarterback. From 1993 to 1994, he was the offensive coordinator for Virginia Union University. Leading up to the 2010s, Harvey was a high school football coach in New Jersey and North Carolina. Outside of football, Harvey was hired by Schwan's Consumer Brands and Ryder. He joined the CIAA Hall of Fame in 2016 and the Black College Football Hall of Fame in 2020.

== Early life ==
James Earl Harvey was born on June 26, 1967. He attended Douglas Byrd High School in Fayetteville, North Carolina. He played on the junior varsity football team his sophomore year, did not play football at all as a junior, and joined the varsity team his senior year. Harvey was offered a scholarship to play college football at North Carolina Central University. Upon hearing of the scholarship offer, Harvey initially thought it was a joke because his high school team had a running oriented offense where Harvey rarely threw the ball, and he also had not even received any honorable mention honors. He had originally planned to "be bagging groceries or in the army" instead of going to college. Harvey also considered playing football at Fayetteville State University before deciding on North Carolina Central. He played three years of basketball at Douglas Byrd and received offers from North Carolina Wesleyan College and High Point College to play college basketball.

== College career ==
Harvey played quarterback for the North Carolina Central Eagles from 1985 to 1988 and was nicknamed Air. In 1985, Harvey set several NCAA Division II freshman records, including for single-season passing yards with 3,190, single-season total offense with 3,008, and single-game touchdown passes with six. He set school and Central Intercollegiate Athletic Association (CIAA) single-game records in pass completions with 33 against Johnson C. Smith on November 9, 1985, in passing yards with 550 against Jackson State on August 30, 1986, and also in total offense with 536 against Jackson State the same day.

In 1988, his team reached the quarterfinals of the NCAA Division II Football Championship. Harvey set Division II, CIAA, and school career records with 10,621 passing yards, 86 touchdown passes, and 10,667 yards of total offense. Harvey's passing yards and passing touchdowns remained as the Division II record until the 1990s. He also continued to hold his total offense record until 1994.

Harvey earned first-team All-CIAA honors all four seasons from 1985 to 1988. He was the CIAA's Offensive Player of the Year in 1985 and shared the award in 1988. He garnered Kodak Division II All-American and Associated Press Little All-America team recognition in 1988. He finished fifth in Harlon Hill Trophy voting in 1986 and third in 1988.

Harvey was inducted into North Carolina Central's Alex M. Riveria Athletics Hall of Fame in 2004. In 2009, he was named one of North Carolina Central's Centennial 100 Sports Legends. Harvey joined the CIAA Hall of Fame in 2016. He also became part of the Black College Football Hall of Fame in 2020 and the Fayetteville Sports Club Hall of Fame in 2022.

== Professional career ==
After going undrafted in the 1989 NFL draft, Harvey had a workout with the BC Lions of the Canadian Football League but was not signed. During August 1989, he was the backup quarterback to Vince Sutton in the Minor League Football System for the Charlotte Barons. The following month, he was playing in the Mason Dixon Semipro League as a quarterback for the Triangle Cardinals. By November 1989, he was also working for a car dealer as a security guard in Durham, North Carolina. Harvey attempted to join the World League of American Football in 1990.

Harvey played in nine games for the New Orleans Night of the Arena Football League (AFL) in 1991. He converted to wide receiver/linebacker in the AFL. During the 1991 season, he recorded nine receptions for 78 yards and two touchdowns, two solo tackles, one assisted tackle, one pass breakup, one kick return for ten yards, and three completions on four passing attempts for 38 yards and one interception.

In March 1992, Harvey was selected by the San Antonio Force in the 1992 AFL expansion draft. He began the 1992 season as a wide receiver/linebacker but took over at quarterback late in the year after starter Ken Lutz suffered an injury. Overall in 1992, Harvey played in all ten games while completing 37 of 77 passes (48.1%) for 493 yards, nine touchdowns, and no interceptions, 40 receptions for 453 yards and six touchdowns, 20 solo tackles, six assisted tackles, one pass breakup, and one fumble recovery. The Force finished the season with a 2–8 record.

From 1993 to 1994, he was the offensive coordinator for Virginia Union University's football team. By 1994, Harvey ended his playing career when he did not receive a spot on the Arizona Rattlers of the AFL. In the mid 1990s, he started working for Schwan's Consumer Brands in New Jersey. He also was a high school football coach before moving to Fayetteville during the mid 2000s.

In 2008, Harvey played for the Fayetteville Guard of the American Indoor Football Association. Harvey created the Level Up Football Development Camp in 2010. In 2017, he became the head football coach at Sandhill Titans High School of Fayetteville. In Fayetteville, he primarily was a high school football coach before he joined Sandhill. Harvey had 14 wins and 8 losses before he left the Titans in 2018. While remaining at Level Up Football in 2020, he had gone to Morrisville, North Carolina and was hired by Ryder.

== Personal life ==
Harvey has one child and is married.
