= 1992 Cleveland Thunderbolts season =

Arena Football League team season

- Head coach: Dave Whinham
- Home stadium: Richfield Coliseum

Results
- Record: 4–6
- Division place: 4th
- Playoffs: Lost 1st Round (Predators) 12-50

The 1992 Cleveland Thunderbolts season was the 2nd season for the franchise, and their first in Cleveland, Ohio after relocating from Columbus, Ohio. They went 4–6 and lost in the playoffs to the Orlando Predators.

== Regular season ==
=== Schedule ===
Week	Date	Opponent	Results		Game site
Week	Date	Opponent	Final score	Team record	Game site
1	May 30	San Antonio Force	W 36–34	1–0	Richfield Coliseum
2	June 6	Charlotte Rage	W 44–28	2–0	Richfield Coliseum
3	June 15	at New Orleans Night	W 30–15	3–0	Louisiana Superdome
4	June 20	at Tampa Bay Storm	L 24–35	3–1	Florida Suncoast Dome
5	June 27	at Albany Firebirds	L 32–47	3–2	Knickerbocker Arena
6	July 2	Detroit Drive	L 36–47	3–3	Richfield Coliseum
7	July 11	Cincinnati Rockers	L 23–31	3–4	Richfield Coliseum
8	July 18	at Cincinnati Rockers	L 20–62	3–5	Riverfront Coliseum
9	July 24	at Detroit Drive	L 20–38	3–6	Joe Louis Arena
10	August 1	Albany Firebirds	W 46–25	4–6	Richfield Coliseum

=== Standings ===
1992 Arena Football League standings
Team	W	L	T	PCT	PF	PA	PF (Avg.)	PA (Avg.)	STK
Southern Division
xyz-Orlando Predators	9	1	0	.900	484	281	48.4	28.1	W 9
x-Tampa Bay Storm	9	1	0	.900	472	354	47.2	35.4	W 4
Charlotte Rage	3	7	0	.300	357	320	35.7	32	L 2
New Orleans Night	0	10	0	.000	258	491	25.8	49.1	L 10
Northern Division
xy-Detroit Drive	8	2	0	.800	497	314	49.7	31.4	W 6
x-Cincinnati Rockers	7	3	0	.700	451	350	45.1	35	L 1
x-Albany Firebirds	5	5	0	.500	422	416	42.2	41.6	L 4
x-Cleveland Thunderbolts	4	6	0	.400	311	362	31.1	36.2	W 1
Western Division
xy-Dallas Texans	5	5	0	.500	354	388	35.4	38.8	W 2
x-Sacramento Attack	4	6	0	.400	354	395	35.4	39.5	W 1
Arizona Rattlers	4	6	0	.400	324	420	32.4	42	L 1
San Antonio Force	2	8	0	.200	268	461	26.8	46.1	L 2

z – clinched homefield advantage

y – clinched division title

x – clinched playoff spot

== Playoffs ==
Round	Date	Opponent	Results		Game site
Round	Date	Opponent	Final score	Team record	Game site
1st	August 7	at Orlando Predators	L 12–50	0–1	Orlando Arena

== Roster ==
1992 Cleveland Thunderbolts roster
Quarterbacks: -- Bobby Bounds; -- Major Harris; Wide Receivers/Defensive Backs: -- Robert Banks; -- Darryl Gard; -- Andre Giles; -- Tony Newsom; -- Ray Puryear	Fullbacks/Linebackers: -- George Cooper; -- Tony Jones; -- Cedric McKinnon; Offensive Linemen/Defensive Linemen: -- Eric Anderson; -- Willie Fears; -- John Fletcher; -- Luther Johnson; -- Andrew Marlatt; -- Rickey Newman; -- Phil Poirier; -- Alvin Powell; -- Brian Williams	Wide Receivers/Linebackers: -- Marvin Bowman; -- Chris Harkness; -- Marvin Mattox; -- Tony Missick; -- Kennedy Wilson; Kickers: -- Chris Drennan; Rookies in italics Roster updated April 3, 2013; 25 Active, 0 Inactive, 0 PS → More rosters
