= Alvin Rettig =

American football player (born 1963)

No. 44
- Position: Fullback/Linebacker

Personal information
- Born: December 6, 1963 (age 62)
- Listed height: 5 ft 11 in (1.80 m)
- Listed weight: 215 lb (98 kg)

Career information
- College: Rice
- NFL draft: 1984: undrafted

Career history
- Detroit Drive (1988–1993)

Awards and highlights
- 4× ArenaBowl champion (1988, 1989, 1990, 1992); First-team All-Arena (1992); 2× Second-team All-Arena (1990, 1991); AFL 10th Anniversary Team (1996); AFL 20 Greatest Players - #16 (2006); AFL 25 Greatest Players - #20 (2012); Arena Football Hall of Fame inductee (1999)

Career AFL statistics
- Rushing yards: 556
- Rushing TDs: 16
- Tackles: 78
- Sacks: 20.5
- Interceptions: 3
- Stats at ArenaFan.com

Alvin Rettig (born December 6, 1963) is an American former professional football fullback/linebacker who played in the Arena Football League (AFL). He played college football at Rice University.

In 1998, Rettig was elected into the Arena Football Hall of Fame.
