= 1992 Cincinnati Rockers season =

Arena Football League team season

- Head coach: Fran Curci
- Home stadium: Riverfront Coliseum

Results
- Record: 7–3
- Division place: 2nd
- Playoffs: Lost 1st Round (Storm) 36–41

The 1992 Cincinnati Rockers season was the first season for the arena football franchise. The Rockers finished 7–3 and lost in the playoffs to the Tampa Bay Storm.

== Regular season ==
=== Schedule ===
Week	Date	Opponent	Results		Game site
Week	Date	Opponent	Final score	Team record	Game site
1	May 30	Detroit Drive	W 37–34	1–0	Riverfront Coliseum
2	June 6	Dallas Texans	W 64–13	2–0	Riverfront Coliseum
3	June 12	at Detroit Drive	L 36–79	2–1	Joe Louis Arena
4	June 20	Albany Firebirds	L 44–45	2–2	Riverfront Coliseum
5	June 27	at San Antonio Force	W 40–7	3–2	HemisFair Arena
6	July 3	Charlotte Rage	W 39–34	4–2	Riverfront Coliseum
7	July 11	at Cleveland Thunderbolts	W 31–23	5–2	Richfield Coliseum
8	July 18	Cleveland Thunderbolts	W 62–20	6–2	Riverfront Coliseum
9	July 25	at Albany Firebirds	W 50–40	7–2	Knickerbocker Arena
10	July 30	at Sacramento Attack	L 48–55 (OT)	7–3	ARCO Arena

=== Standings ===
1992 Arena Football League standings
Team	W	L	T	PCT	PF	PA	PF (Avg.)	PA (Avg.)	STK
Southern Division
xyz-Orlando Predators	9	1	0	.900	484	281	48.4	28.1	W 9
x-Tampa Bay Storm	9	1	0	.900	472	354	47.2	35.4	W 4
Charlotte Rage	3	7	0	.300	357	320	35.7	32	L 2
New Orleans Night	0	10	0	.000	258	491	25.8	49.1	L 10
Northern Division
xy-Detroit Drive	8	2	0	.800	497	314	49.7	31.4	W 6
x-Cincinnati Rockers	7	3	0	.700	451	350	45.1	35	L 1
x-Albany Firebirds	5	5	0	.500	422	416	42.2	41.6	L 4
x-Cleveland Thunderbolts	4	6	0	.400	311	362	31.1	36.2	W 1
Western Division
xy-Dallas Texans	5	5	0	.500	354	388	35.4	38.8	W 2
x-Sacramento Attack	4	6	0	.400	354	395	35.4	39.5	W 1
Arizona Rattlers	4	6	0	.400	324	420	32.4	42	L 1
San Antonio Force	2	8	0	.200	268	461	26.8	46.1	L 2

z – clinched homefield advantage

y – clinched division title

x – clinched playoff spot

== Playoffs ==
Round	Date	Opponent	Results		Game site
Round	Date	Opponent	Final score	Team record	Game site
1st	August 8	at Tampa Bay Storm	L 36–41	0–1	Florida Suncoast Dome

== Roster ==
1992 Cincinnati Rockers roster
Quarterbacks: -- Clemente Gordon; 7 Art Schlichter; Wide receivers/Defensive backs: -- Brad Calip; -- Richard Carey; 20 Chris Barber; 84 Ira Hillary; -- Bruce LaSane; -- Corey Ray; -- Bobby Roland; 80 Todd Smith; -- Alonzo Sullivan; -- Riley Ware; -- Ralph Williams	Fullbacks/Linebackers: 33 Tony Collins; -- Joey Couch; 32 Mel Mills; 34 Dan Sellers; -- David Smith; Offensive linemen/Defensive linemen: -- Kevin Allen; -- Jerry Bell; -- Mike Bitterman; -- Tony Catchings; -- Mike Jones; -- Kubanai Kalombo; -- Karl Morgan; -- Saute Sapolu; -- Bobby Sign; -- Steve Slay; 87 Jackie Walker	Wide Receiver/Linebackers: -- Jay Koch; Kickers: -- David Browndyke; Rookies in italics Roster updated April 1, 2013; 31 Active, 0 Inactive, 0 PS → More rosters
