= 1992 Tampa Bay Storm season =

AFL football league season

- Owner: Bob Gries
- Head coach: Lary Kuharich
- Home stadium: Florida Suncoast Dome

Results
- Record: 9–1
- Division place: 2nd
- Playoffs: Won 1st round (Rockers) 43-36; Lost semi-finals (Predators) 21-24 (OT)
- Team MVP: Jay Gruden

The 1992 Tampa Bay Storm season was the sixth season for the Arena Football League franchise. They finished 9–1 in the Southern Division, tied with the Orlando Predators, but Orlando won the division due to having scored more points than the Storm. The Storm lost to Orlando in the semifinals.

== Regular season ==
=== Schedule ===
Week	Date	Opponent	Results		Game site
Week	Date	Opponent	Final score	Team record	Game site
1	May 29	at Orlando Predators	W 39–32	1–0	Orlando Arena
2	June 6	New Orleans Night	W 64–60	2–0	Florida Suncoast Dome
3	June 12	at Charlotte Rage	W 39–37	3–0	Charlotte Coliseum
4	June 20	Cleveland Thunderbolts	W 35–24	4–0	Florida Suncoast Dome
5	June 27	at Dallas Texans	W 49–37	5–0	Reunion Arena
6	July 2	Orlando Predators	L 33–48	5–1	Florida Suncoast Dome
7	July 11	at Arizona Rattlers	W 59–28	6–1	America West Arena
8	July 18	Albany Firebirds	W 51–34	7–1	Florida Suncoast Dome
9	July 25	at New Orleans Night	W 53–14	8–1	Louisiana Superdome
10	August 1	Charlotte Rage	W 39–32	9–1	Florida Suncoast Dome

=== Standings ===
1992 Arena Football League standings
Team	W	L	T	PCT	PF	PA	PF (Avg.)	PA (Avg.)	STK
Southern Division
xyz-Orlando Predators	9	1	0	.900	484	281	48.4	28.1	W 9
x-Tampa Bay Storm	9	1	0	.900	472	354	47.2	35.4	W 4
Charlotte Rage	3	7	0	.300	357	320	35.7	32	L 2
New Orleans Night	0	10	0	.000	258	491	25.8	49.1	L 10
Northern Division
xy-Detroit Drive	8	2	0	.800	497	314	49.7	31.4	W 6
x-Cincinnati Rockers	7	3	0	.700	451	350	45.1	35	L 1
x-Albany Firebirds	5	5	0	.500	422	416	42.2	41.6	L 4
x-Cleveland Thunderbolts	4	6	0	.400	311	362	31.1	36.2	W 1
Western Division
xy-Dallas Texans	5	5	0	.500	354	388	35.4	38.8	W 2
x-Sacramento Attack	4	6	0	.400	354	395	35.4	39.5	W 1
Arizona Rattlers	4	6	0	.400	324	420	32.4	42	L 1
San Antonio Force	2	8	0	.200	268	461	26.8	46.1	L 2

z – clinched homefield advantage

y – clinched division title

x – clinched playoff spot

== Playoffs ==
Round	Date	Opponent	Results		Game site
Round	Date	Opponent	Final score	Team record	Game site
1st	August 8	Cincinnati Rockers	W 41–36	1–0	Florida Suncoast Dome
Semi-finals	August 15	at Orlando Predators	W 21–24 (OT)	1–1	Orlando Arena

== Roster ==
1992 Tampa Bay Storm roster
Quarterbacks: 7 Jay Gruden; -- Paul Singer; Wide Receivers/Defensive Backs: -- Reggie Berry; -- Eddie Brown; -- Bobby Byrd; -- John Gainey; -- Anthony Howard; -- Jasen Jester; -- Jeff Mayes; -- Eugene Napoleon; -- James Rainey	Running Backs/Linebackers: -- Andre Bowden; -- Lynn Bradford; -- Shawn Faulkner; -- Doug Landry; Offensive Linemen/Defensive Linemen: -- Keith Browner; -- Winfred Bryant; -- Scott Hough; -- Ralph Jarvis; -- Brent Napierkowski; -- Pat Sperduto; -- Carl Watts; -- Deatrich Wise	Defensive Specialists: -- Corey Dowden; 24 Tracey Perkins; Kickers: -- Arden Czyzewski; -- Paul Hickert; -- Donald Igwebuike; Rookies in italics Roster updated March 28, 2013; 27 Active, 0 Inactive, 0 PS → More rosters

== Awards ==
Position	Player	Award	All-Arena team
Quarterback	Jay Gruden	Most Valuable Player	1st
Offensive Specialist/Kick Returner	Stevie Thomas	none	1st
