= Niu Sale =

American football player (born 1969)

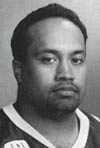

No. 34
- Position: Wide receiver / Linebacker

Personal information
- Born: November 17, 1969 (age 56)
- Listed height: 5 ft 9 in (1.75 m)
- Listed weight: 190 lb (86 kg)

Career information
- High school: Bishop Montgomery (Torrance, California)
- College: El Camino (1988–1989); Missouri (1990)
- NFL draft: 1992: undrafted

Career history
- Sacramento Attack/Miami Hooters (1992–1993); Massachusetts Marauders (1994); St. Louis Stampede (1996)*
- * Offseason or practice squad member only

Awards and highlights
- First-team All-Arena (1993); Second-team All-Arena (1994); AFL All-Star (1993); 2× First-team All-American (1988–1989)

Career AFL statistics
- Receptions: 69
- Receiving yards: 963
- Receiving TDs: 12
- Tackles: 100
- Interceptions: 7
- Stats at ArenaFan.com

Niusumelie Sale (born November 17, 1969) is an American former professional football player who played three seasons in the Arena Football League (AFL) with the Sacramento Attack/Miami Hooters and Massachusetts Marauders. He played college football at El Camino College and the University of Missouri. He was a two-time first-team All-American while at El Camino College and a two-time All-Arena selection while in the AFL. While with the Attack/Hooters, Sale was a member of an informal group of Polynesian players on the team called "The Committee".

== Early life ==
Niusumelie Sale was born on November 17, 1969. He grew up in Carson, California, and started playing flag football when he was nine. He played high school football at Bishop Montgomery High School in Torrance, California as a two-way player. Sale spent time at quarterback, defensive back, tailback, and linebacker at Bishop Montgomery High. He passed for 1,228 yards and rushed for 1,011 yards his junior year, becoming the first player in school history to pass and rush for over 1,000 yards each in one season. On defense, he earned all-league honors three times and first-team Daily Breeze All-Area honors twice. Sale was inducted into the Bishop Montgomery High School Athletic Hall of Fame in 2022.

== College career ==
Sale was recruited by several schools, including UTEP, Tennessee, and Arizona. However, he did not qualify academically for the NCAA and instead played college football at El Camino College. He played for the El Camino Warriors from 1988 to 1989 as a safety, earning all-conference and first-team All-American honors each season. He recorded 197 tackles and 11 interceptions during his two-year career at El Camino. Sale also returned punts and kicks and was a holder for the Warriors. El Camino attempted seven fake kicks in 1989, with Sale scoring on six of them. The 1989 Warriors went 10–0 before losing to Riverside City College in the Orange County Bowl, finishing the season ranked No. 4 nationally by J.C. Gridwire. Sale was inducted into the El Camino College Athletic Hall of Fame in 2003. In 2019, Sale was named to El Camino's 1980s All-Decade Team as an all-purpose player.

Sale transferred to play for the Missouri Tigers of the University of Missouri. He earned a varsity letter in 1990 as a safety. In the first game of the season against the TCU Horned Frogs, Sale returned a punt 52 yards for a touchdown, which was Missouri's first punt return touchdown since Bill Whitaker in 1978. However, Sale also fumbled the kickoff on the team's final possession as Missouri lost by a score of 20–19. In 1990, he totaled two interceptions for 22 yards, eight punt returns for 139 yards and one touchdown, and one kick return for 22 yards. He also scored a defensive extra point on a fumble recovery. Sale played most of the year with a broken finger and an occasional hurt ankle. He did not play in 1991 due to being ruled academically ineligible.

== Professional career ==
=== Sacramento Attack/Miami Hooters ===
Sale played in all ten games for the Sacramento Attack of the Arena Football League (AFL) in 1992, totaling six catches for 126 yards and one touchdown, six carries for 20 yards, five kick returns for 125 yards and one touchdown, 47 solo tackles, 11 assisted tackles, two forced fumbles, 16 pass breakups, and five interceptions for 61 yards and one touchdown. He played both offense and defense during his time in the AFL as the league played under ironman rules. The Attack finished the 1992 season with a 4–6 record.

In 1993, the Hooters restaurant chain purchased the Attack and moved the team to Miami, Florida, renaming them the Miami Hooters. Sale appeared in all 12 games for the Hooters that season, recording 45 receptions for 616 yards and eight touchdowns, 43 kick returns for 865 yards, 23 solo tackles, seven assisted tackles, three fumble recoveries, five pass breakups, and one interception that he returned 14 yards for a touchdown. He was named first-team All-Arena as a wide receiver/linebacker for his performance during the 1993 season. He was also named to the 1993 AFL All-Star Game. The Hooters finished the year with a 5–7 record and lost in the first round of the playoffs to the Orlando Predators. While with the Attack/Hooters, Sale was a member of an informal group of Polynesian players on the team called "The Committee", which included Alo Sila, George Fua, Richard Ane, Junior Ili, Ken Sale, and Kaiser Noa at several points in time. The group appeared in various promotions and visited hospitals. The Committee named the van they drove in "The Canoe".

=== Massachusetts Marauders ===
Sale played in eight games for the Massachusetts Marauders of the AFL in 1994, accumulating 18 catches for 221 yards and three touchdowns, eight carries for 35 yards and one touchdown, 18 solo tackles, six assisted tackles, one forced fumble, one fumble recovery, three pass breakups, and one interception. On August 2, 1994, he was placed on the team's suspended list for an unknown reason. He garnered second-team All-Arena recognition for the 1994 season. The Marauders finished the year with an 8–4 record and later lost to the Predators in the semifinals.

=== St. Louis Stampede ===
Sale signed with the AFL's St. Louis Stampede in March 1996. He was waived in April 1996 before the start of the 1996 AFL season.

== Personal life ==
Sale is of Samoan descent. His brother Ken Sale played college football at El Camino College and the University of Texas at El Paso, and professionally in the World League of American Football and the AFL.
