= 1992 Dallas Texans season =

Arena Football League team season

1992 Dallas Texans (arena football) season
- Owner: Kent Kramer; Greg Gibson
- Head coach: John Paul Young
- Home stadium: Reunion Arena

Results
- Record: 5–5
- Division place: 1st
- Playoffs: Won 1st round (Firebirds)48-45; Lost semi-finals (Drive) 14–57

The 1992 Dallas Texans season was the third season for the Texans. They finished with a record of 5–5 winning the Western Division. The Texans would lose in the AFL Semi-finals vs the Detroit Drive.

== Regular season ==
=== Schedule ===
Week	Date	Opponent	Results		Game site
Week	Date	Opponent	Final score	Team record	Game site
1	May 29	Sacramento Attack	W 49–27	1–0	Reunion Arena
2	June 6	at Cincinnati Rockers	L 13–64	1–1	Riverfront Coliseum
3	June 13	Albany Firebirds	L 27–37	1–2	Reunion Arena
4	June 19	at Charlotte Rage	W 32–30	2–2	Charlotte Coliseum
5	June 27	Tampa Bay Storm	L 37–49	2–3	Reunion Arena
6	July 3	at Arizona Rattlers	L 35–42	2–4	America West Arena
7	July 11	San Antonio Force	W 47–35	3–4	Reunion Arena
8	July 18	at San Antonio Force	L 40–41	3–5	HemisFair Arena
9	July 23	at Sacramento Attack	W 41–38	4–5	ARCO Arena
10	August 1	Arizona Rattlers	W 33–25	5–5	Reunion Arena

=== Standings ===
1992 Arena Football League standings
Team	W	L	T	PCT	PF	PA	PF (Avg.)	PA (Avg.)	STK
Southern Division
xyz-Orlando Predators	9	1	0	.900	484	281	48.4	28.1	W 9
x-Tampa Bay Storm	9	1	0	.900	472	354	47.2	35.4	W 4
Charlotte Rage	3	7	0	.300	357	320	35.7	32	L 2
New Orleans Night	0	10	0	.000	258	491	25.8	49.1	L 10
Northern Division
xy-Detroit Drive	8	2	0	.800	497	314	49.7	31.4	W 6
x-Cincinnati Rockers	7	3	0	.700	451	350	45.1	35	L 1
x-Albany Firebirds	5	5	0	.500	422	416	42.2	41.6	L 4
x-Cleveland Thunderbolts	4	6	0	.400	311	362	31.1	36.2	W 1
Western Division
xy-Dallas Texans	5	5	0	.500	354	388	35.4	38.8	W 2
x-Sacramento Attack	4	6	0	.400	354	395	35.4	39.5	W 1
Arizona Rattlers	4	6	0	.400	324	420	32.4	42	L 1
San Antonio Force	2	8	0	.200	268	461	26.8	46.1	L 2

z – clinched homefield advantage
y – clinched division title
x – clinched playoff spot

== Playoffs ==
Round	Date	Opponent	Results		Game site
Round	Date	Opponent	Final score	Team record	Game site
1	August 8	at Albany Firebirds	W 48–45	1–0	Knickerbocker Arena
2	August 14	at Detroit Drive	L 14–57	1–1	Riverfront Coliseum

== Roster ==
1992 Dallas Texans roster
Quarterbacks: -- Don Bailey; 5 Todd Hammel; Wide Receivers/Defensive Backs: -- Joe Brookins; -- Ken Brown; -- Jitter Fields; 29 Mark Jackson; -- Greg Lewis; -- Tyrone Thurman	Fullbacks/Linebackers: -- Terry Bagsby; -- David Chapman; -- Charles Rowe; Offensive Linemen/Defensive Linemen: -- Arnold Campbell; -- Bobby Duncum, Jr.; 89 Frank Harris; -- Ted Hennings; -- Charles Perry; -- Dwayne Phorne	Wide Receivers/Linebackers: -- Gary Compton; -- Reggie Davis; -- Norman Floyd; -- Alex Morris; -- Toren Robinson; Kickers: -- Keith Chapman; -- Scott Segrist; Rookies in italics Roster updated April 4, 2013; 24 Active, 0 Inactive, 0 PS → More rosters

== Awards ==
Position	Player	Award	All-Arena team
Wide Receiver/Defensive Back	Gary Compton	none	1st
