= 1992 Arizona Rattlers season =

Indoor football season

- Owner: Jerry Colangelo
- Head coach: Danny White
- Home stadium: America West Arena

Results
- Record: 4–6
- Division place: 3rd
- Playoffs: Did not qualify

The 1992 Arizona Rattlers season marked the 1st season for the franchise. The Rattlers sold out every home game during the season.

== Regular season ==
=== Schedule ===
Week	Date	Opponent	Results		Game site
Week	Date	Opponent	Final score	Team record	Game site
1	May 30	at Albany Firebirds	L 27–49	0–1	Knickerbocker Arena
2	June 6	at San Antonio Force	L 29–43	0–2	HemisFair Arena
3	June 13	Sacramento Attack	W 51–36	1–2	America West Arena
4	June 20	New Orleans Night	W 23–15	2–2	America West Arena
5	June 26	at Sacramento Attack	L 16–35	2–3	ARCO Arena
6	July 3	Dallas Texans	W 42–35	3–3	America West Arena
7	July 11	Tampa Bay Storm	L 28–59	3–4	America West Arena
8	July 17	at Orlando Predators	L 21–71	3–5	Orlando Arena
9	July 25	San Antonio Force	W 54–31	4–5	America West Arena
10	August 1	at Dallas Texans	L 25–33	4–6	Reunion Arena

=== Standings ===
1992 Arena Football League standings
Team	W	L	T	PCT	PF	PA	PF (Avg.)	PA (Avg.)	STK
Southern Division
xyz-Orlando Predators	9	1	0	.900	484	281	48.4	28.1	W 9
x-Tampa Bay Storm	9	1	0	.900	472	354	47.2	35.4	W 4
Charlotte Rage	3	7	0	.300	357	320	35.7	32	L 2
New Orleans Night	0	10	0	.000	258	491	25.8	49.1	L 10
Northern Division
xy-Detroit Drive	8	2	0	.800	497	314	49.7	31.4	W 6
x-Cincinnati Rockers	7	3	0	.700	451	350	45.1	35	L 1
x-Albany Firebirds	5	5	0	.500	422	416	42.2	41.6	L 4
x-Cleveland Thunderbolts	4	6	0	.400	311	362	31.1	36.2	W 1
Western Division
xy-Dallas Texans	5	5	0	.500	354	388	35.4	38.8	W 2
x-Sacramento Attack	4	6	0	.400	354	395	35.4	39.5	W 1
Arizona Rattlers	4	6	0	.400	324	420	32.4	42	L 1
San Antonio Force	2	8	0	.200	268	461	26.8	46.1	L 2

z – clinched homefield advantage

y – clinched division title

x – clinched playoff spot

== Roster ==
1992 Arizona Rattlers roster
Quarterbacks: -- Steve Belles; 11 Gene Johnson; Wide receivers/Defensive backs: -- Nathan LaDuke; 1 Ricki Lopez; -- Michael Richmond; 80 Cedric Tillman; -- Mike Yamamoto	Fullbacks/Linebackers: -- Marion Bates; 44 Andy Coviello; -- David Eldridge; -- Art Greathouse; Offensive linemen/Defensive linemen: -- Illya Berry; 77 Rod Ferguson; 89 Kevin Fitzgerald; -- Onterio Ford; 50 Glenn Haisley; -- Darin Mrachek; -- Judd Rachow; -- Kevin Thomas; 68 Barry Waggoner; 60 John Zinser	Wide receiver/Linebackers: 8 Roy Hurd; -- Garland Rivers; -- James Turnage; -- Allan Whiting; Kickers: 03 Luis Zendejas; Rookies in italics Roster updated April 4, 2013; 30 Active, 0 Inactive, 0 PS → More rosters
