= 2004 Orlando Predators season =

Arena Football League team season

- Head coach: Jay Gruden
- Home stadium: TD Waterhouse Centre

Results
- Record: 10-6
- Division place: 2nd
- Playoffs: Lost Quarterfinals (Rush) 49-59

The 2004 Orlando Predators season was the 14th season for the franchise. They went 10-6 and lost in the Quarterfinals to the Chicago Rush.

== Regular season ==
=== Schedule ===
Week	Date	Opponent	Results		Game site
Week	Date	Opponent	Final score	Team record	Game site
1	February 8	at Tampa Bay Storm	L 41-52	0-1	St. Pete Times Forum
2	February 13	Austin Wranglers	L 48-49 (OT)	0-2	TD Waterhouse Centre
3	Bye				
4	February 28	at Carolina Cobras	W 59-43	1-2	Charlotte Coliseum
5	March 6	Indiana Firebirds	W 50-38	2-2	TD Waterhouse Centre
6	March 12	Georgia Force	L 44-52	2-3	TD Waterhouse Centre
7	March 21	at Chicago Rush	L 15-58	2-4	Allstate Arena
8	March 27	Las Vegas Gladiators	W 60-43	3-4	TD Waterhouse Centre
9	April 4	at Columbus Destroyers	L 46-55	3-5	Nationwide Arena
10	April 9	New Orleans VooDoo	W 57-24	4-5	TD Waterhouse Centre
11	April 18	at Georgia Force	W 30-7	5-5	Philips Arena
12	April 25	Dallas Desperados	W 64-49	6-5	TD Waterhouse Centre
13	May 2	Tampa Bay Storm	L 58-63	6-6	TD Waterhouse Centre
14	May 9	at New Orleans VooDoo	W 45-40	7-6	New Orleans Arena
15	May 16	at Austin Wranglers	W 43-26	8-6	Frank Erwin Center
16	May 23	New York Dragons	W 65-41	9-6	TD Waterhouse Centre
17	May 30	at Los Angeles Avengers	W 52-50	10-6	Staples Center

== Playoffs ==
Round	Date	Opponent	Results		Game site
Round	Date	Opponent	Final score	Team record	Game site
Conference Semifinals	June 6	at Chicago Rush	L 49-59	0-1	Allstate Arena
