= 1992 New Orleans Night season =

Arena Football League team season

- Head coach: Vince Gibson
- Home stadium: Louisiana Superdome

Results
- Record: 0–10
- Division place: 4th
- Playoffs: did not qualify

The 1992 New Orleans Night season was the 2nd season for the franchise. They went 4–6 in 1991 and looked to make the playoffs in 1992, but they went 0–10 and missed the playoffs. Their 0–10 season was the 3rd winless season in Arena Football League history; the last team to do it before the Night was the 1991 Columbus Thunderbolts. They were disbanded after the season.

== Regular season ==
=== Schedule ===
Week	Date	Opponent	Results		Game site
Week	Date	Opponent	Final score	Team record	Game site
1	May 30	at Charlotte Rage	L 23–43	0–1	Charlotte Coliseum
2	June 6	at Tampa Bay Storm	L 60–64	0–2	Florida Suncoast Dome
3	June 15	Cleveland Thunderbolts	L 15–30	0–3	Louisiana Superdome
4	June 20	at Arizona Rattlers	L 15–23	0–4	America West Arena
5	June 27	Detroit Drive	L 41–66	0–5	Louisiana Superdome
6	July 3	at Albany Firebirds	L 29–67	0–6	Knickerbocker Arena
7	July 11	Orlando Predators	L 20–45	0–7	Louisiana Superdome
8	July 18	Charlotte Rage	L 33–38	0–8	Louisiana Superdome
9	July 25	Tampa Bay Storm	L 14–53	0–9	Louisiana Superdome
10	July 31	at Orlando Predators	L 8–62	0–10	Orlando Arena

=== Standings ===
1992 Arena Football League standings
Team	W	L	T	PCT	PF	PA	PF (Avg.)	PA (Avg.)	STK
Southern Division
xyz-Orlando Predators	9	1	0	.900	484	281	48.4	28.1	W 9
x-Tampa Bay Storm	9	1	0	.900	472	354	47.2	35.4	W 4
Charlotte Rage	3	7	0	.300	357	320	35.7	32	L 2
New Orleans Night	0	10	0	.000	258	491	25.8	49.1	L 10
Northern Division
xy-Detroit Drive	8	2	0	.800	497	314	49.7	31.4	W 6
x-Cincinnati Rockers	7	3	0	.700	451	350	45.1	35	L 1
x-Albany Firebirds	5	5	0	.500	422	416	42.2	41.6	L 4
x-Cleveland Thunderbolts	4	6	0	.400	311	362	31.1	36.2	W 1
Western Division
xy-Dallas Texans	5	5	0	.500	354	388	35.4	38.8	W 2
x-Sacramento Attack	4	6	0	.400	354	395	35.4	39.5	W 1
Arizona Rattlers	4	6	0	.400	324	420	32.4	42	L 1
San Antonio Force	2	8	0	.200	268	461	26.8	46.1	L 2

== Roster ==
1992 New Orleans Night roster
Quarterbacks: -- Greg Freeman; 17 Mickey Guidry; 7 Danny Keeton; Wide Receivers/Defensive Backs: -- Brian Beck; -- Michael Clark; -- Sean Dykes; 1 Wyatt Harris; 33 LoLo James; -- James Jones; -- Thomas Monroe; -- Cedric Moses; 5 Elliot Searcy; -- Todd Simmons; -- Darryl Tillman; 15 Brian Wiggins; 10 Alvin William	Running Backs/Linebackers: 32 Mike Lindsey; -- Kent Robertson; Offensive Linemen/Defensive Linemen: -- Jerry Bell; 84 Eric Bias; 75 Jim Bishop; 75 Bruce Clark; -- Fred Davis; 87 Lamar Davis; 82 Matt Martinez; -- Darren Mullenberg; 50 Carl Thomas; -- Gary Willison; 65 Doc Wise	Wide Receivers/Linebackers: 89 Richard Estell; 27 Bruce Miller; Kickers: 3 Teddy Garcia; 3 Marco Morales; Rookies in italics Roster updated March 15, 2013; 32 Active, 0 Inactive, 0 PS → More rosters

== Awards ==
Position	Player	Award	All-Arena team
Offensive/Defensive Lineman	Doc Wise	none	1st

== Coaching ==
Vince Gibson entered as the second and final head coach of the Night.
