= Gilbert Renfroe =

American gridiron football player (born 1963)

No. 7, 14
- Position: Quarterback

Personal information
- Born: February 18, 1963 (age 63); Tuskegee, Alabama, U.S.
- Listed height: 6 ft 2 in (1.88 m)
- Listed weight: 210 lb (95 kg)

Career information
- College: Tennessee State
- NFL draft: 1986: undrafted

Career history
- Ottawa Rough Riders (1986); Toronto Argonauts (1987–1989); Atlanta Falcons (1990); Minnesota Vikings (1990); Atlanta Falcons (1991)*; Calgary Stampeders (1991); Detroit Drive (1992–1993); BC Lions (1992); Shreveport Pirates (1994)*
- * Offseason or practice squad member only

Awards and highlights
- ArenaBowl champion (1992)

Career CFL statistics
- Comp. / att.: 657 / 1,296
- Passing yards: 9,141
- TD–INT: 48–55
- Rushing TD: 3

Career AFL statistics
- Comp. / att.: 287 / 538
- Passing yards: 4,052
- TD–INT: 58–18
- Passer rating: 90.93
- Rushing TD: 7
- Stats at ArenaFan.com

Gilbert Renfroe (born February 18, 1963) is an American former professional football quarterback.

== Early career ==
Renfroe played college football at Tennessee State University from 1982 to 1985. With the Tennessee State Tigers, he finished fourth all-time in total offensive yards and passing yards. After going undrafted and unsigned by the National Football League, he signed in 1986 with the Ottawa Rough Riders of the Canadian Football League. He was traded to the Toronto Argonauts for the 1987 season, where he split the Argos starting job with fellow rookie John Congemi. The Argonauts finished 11–6–1 and played in the 75th Grey Cup. Renfroe started the game and threw two touchdowns, including a 61-yard pass to Gil Fenerty. He was injured in the third quarter and left the game with the Argonauts trailing 35–29. Backup Danny Barrett rushed for the go ahead touchdown with 2:36 left in the game, but the Argos missed the two-point conversion. The Edmonton Eskimos would go on win the game 38–36 on a Jerry Kauric field goal. He spent most of the season on the bench during the 1988 as the Argonauts started John Congemi. Congemi won the starting job in the 1989 season, but was injured in mid-September and Renfroe was once again the Argos' starter.

== NFL career ==
Renfroe moved to the NFL for the 1990 season. He was signed by the Atlanta Falcons on February 28, 1990. He did not make the final roster and was cut on the final day of the preseason. He was re-signed eight days later when Hugh Millen was granted his request for a release after falling all the way to the third spot on the depth chart. Renfroe practiced three times with the Falcons and saw some action on special teams in a 21–14 loss to the Detroit Lions before being waived on September 18 for the second time in a week and the third time in 17 days. On September 26 he was signed by the Minnesota Vikings after starting quarterback Wade Wilson was sidelined after thumb surgery. Renfroe was the Vikings first ever black quarterback. He was cut by the Vikings on November 21 when Wilson returned from injury. He returned to the Falcons the following season but was cut after Billy Joe Tolliver was traded to the Falcons to take the final spot behind Chris Miller and Brett Favre. After being cut by the Falcons, he played nine games for the Calgary Stampeders.

He was charged with DUI in May 1992. He had previously been charged less than a year earlier.

== Post NFL career ==
After a failed tryout with the Kansas City Chiefs, Renfroe signed with the Detroit Drive of the Arena Football League. In his first AFL season, he completed 103 of 194 passes for 1,417 yards, 24 touchdowns, an 8 interceptions. He led the Drive to a 56–38 romp over the Orlando Predators in ArenaBowl VI. He completed 17 of 26 passes for 229 yards with four touchdowns and no interceptions. His 65.8% completion rate was an ArenaBowl record.

He had similar success the following year, completing 184 of 344 passes for 2,635 yards, 34 touchdowns and 10 interceptions. The Drive finished 11–1 and once again made the ArenaBowl VII, however they were defeated by the Tampa Bay Storm, 51–31.

He returned to the CFL in 1994, signing with the expansion Shreveport Pirates. He was cut before the start of the season.
