= Jay Gruden =

American football coach and player (born 1967)

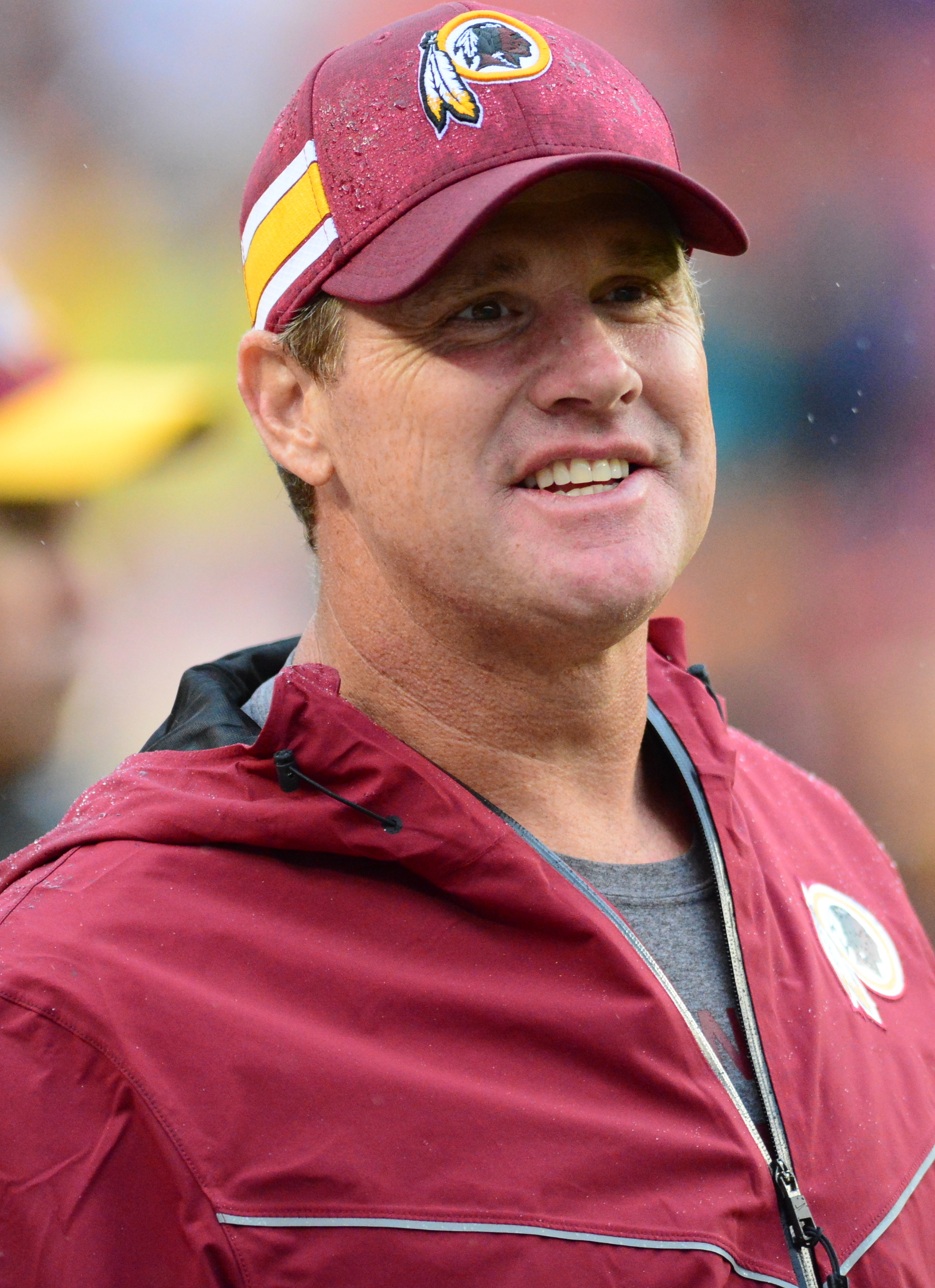
- Gruden with the Washington Redskins in 2018

No. 3, 7
- Position: Quarterback

Personal information
- Born: March 4, 1967 (age 59); Tiffin, Ohio, U.S.
- Listed height: 6 ft 2 in (1.88 m)
- Listed weight: 225 lb (102 kg)

Career information
- High school: George D. Chamberlain (Tampa, Florida)
- College: Louisville (1985–1988)
- NFL draft: 1989: undrafted

Career history

Playing
- Miami Dolphins (1989)*; Barcelona Dragons (1990); Sacramento Surge (1990); Tampa Bay Storm (1991–1995); Scottish Claymores (1995); Tampa Bay Storm (1996); Orlando Predators (2002–2003)
- * Offseason or practice squad member only

Coaching
- Louisville (1989) Student assistant; Louisville (1990-1991) Graduate assistant; Nashville Kats (1997) Offensive coordinator; Orlando Predators (1998–2001) Head coach; Tampa Bay Buccaneers (2002–2008) Offensive assistant; Orlando Predators (2004–2008) Head coach; Florida Tuskers (2009) Offensive coordinator; Florida Tuskers (2010) Head coach; Cincinnati Bengals (2011–2013) Offensive coordinator; Washington Redskins (2014–2019) Head coach; Jacksonville Jaguars (2020) Offensive coordinator; Los Angeles Rams (2022) Consultant

Awards and highlights
- As player: 4× ArenaBowl champion (1991, 1993, 1995, 1996); ArenaBowl MVP (1993); AFL MVP (1992); 2× First-team All-Arena (1992, 1995); Arena Football League 10th Anniversary Team; Arena Football League 15th Anniversary Team; Arena Football League 25 Greatest Players; Arena Football Hall of Fame; As coach: Super Bowl champion (XXXVII); 2× ArenaBowl champion (1998, 2000)

Career AFL statistics
- Completion %: 59.8%
- Passing yards: 21,479
- TD–INT: 397–99
- Passer rating: 108.8
- Rushing TDs: 5
- Stats at ArenaFan.com

Head coaching record
- Regular season: AFL: 82–54 (.603); UFL: 5–3 (.625); NFL: 35–49–1 (.418)
- Postseason: AFL: 11–7 (.611); UFL: 0–1 (.000); NFL: 0–1 (.000)
- Career: AFL: 93–61 (.604); UFL: 5–4 (.556); NFL: 35–50–1 (.413)
- Coaching profile at Pro Football Reference

Jay Michael Gruden (born March 4, 1967) is an American football coach and former quarterback. He previously served as the head coach of the Washington Redskins from 2014 to 2019 and as offensive coordinator for the Cincinnati Bengals and Jacksonville Jaguars. During his time in the Arena Football League (AFL), Gruden won four ArenaBowls as a player and two more as a head coach. He is the younger brother of former NFL head coach Jon Gruden and was an assistant coach of the 2002 Buccaneers team that won Super Bowl XXXVII.

== Early life ==
Of Slovene descent, Gruden was born on March 4, 1967, in Tiffin, Ohio, and was raised a Roman Catholic. He attended George D. Chamberlain High School in Tampa, Florida, and played quarterback for the Chamberlain Chiefs high school football team under head coach Billy Turner. Gruden earned All-Western Conference First Team recognition.

== College career ==
Gruden attended the University of Louisville, where he was a four-year letterman at Louisville Cardinals football team (1985–1988). Gruden finished his collegiate career with 7,024 passing yards (as of 2013, fourth all-time for the school), completing 572 of 1,049 passes for 44 touchdowns. All four stats still rank in the top five in Cardinals history. He also ranks in Louisville's top 10 for yards per completion, passing attempts in a season, and completions in a season. Gruden ranks eighth in career completion percentage, seventh in career passing efficiency, and ninth in average yards per game for the Cardinals. He threw for over 300 yards in a game six times at Louisville. Gruden led the team to an 8–3 record as a senior, their first winning season in 10 years.

After his playing career ended, Gruden remained active with the football program at Louisville, gaining his first coaching experience as a student assistant in 1989 and as a graduate assistant in the 1990 and 1991 seasons.

== Professional playing career ==
Upon the conclusion of his college playing career, Gruden was signed to the Miami Dolphins practice squad after an injury to starter Dan Marino shortly before the 1989 season opener, but was waived several days later. He then had brief stints with the Barcelona Dragons and the Sacramento Surge of the WLAF in 1990, while continuing to gain coaching experience at his alma mater of Louisville as a graduate assistant.

=== Arena ===
In 1991, Gruden turned his attention to indoor football, signing with the Tampa Bay Storm of the Arena Football League. Gruden won four ArenaBowl titles as the starting quarterback of the Storm, only briefly leaving the team in early 1995 for a training camp stint with the Scottish Claymores of the WLAF. Upon realization that he would be the Claymores third-string quarterback, he returned to Florida and immediately resumed his role as the starting quarterback for the Storm.

Gruden was named the league's MVP in 1992, and is contemporarily considered one of the greatest quarterbacks in arena football history. After stepping off the field to coach, Gruden returned to the field in 2002, playing quarterback for the Orlando Predators for the 2002 and 2003 seasons before retiring again from playing football.

=== Honors and awards ===
- 1992: League MVP & First Team All-Arena
- 1993: ArenaBowl VII MVP
- 1993: All-Star Game MVP
- 1995: First Team All-Arena
- 1996: AFL's 10th Anniversary Team
- 1999: AFL Hall of Fame & All-ArenaBowl Team
- 2001: Second Team 15th Team Anniversary
- 2006: Ranked fourth on the AFL's list of greatest players

=== AFL career statistics ===
Legend
	AFL MVP
	Won the ArenaBowl
	Led the league
**Bold**	Career high

Year	Team	Passing							Rushing		
Year	Team	Cmp	Att	Pct	Yds	TD	Int	Rtg	Att	Yds	TD
1991	TB	127	199	**63.8**	1,504	26	11	96.39	17	**55**	**2**
1992	TB	189	305	62.0	2,491	50	15	106.8	13	37	0
1993	TB	188	312	60.3	2,516	41	14	100.05	15	15	1
1994	TB	206	368	56.0	2,597	49	12	97.84	9	32	**2**
1995	TB	197	352	56.0	2,787	44	11	99.94	**20**	7	0
1996	TB	275	447	61.5	**3,626**	**70**	14	113.25	8	−14	0
2002	ORL	**310**	**501**	61.9	3,621	68	**20**	101.06	7	−4	0
2003	ORL	183	313	58.5	2,334	49	2	**118.35**	5	−2	0
Career		1,675	2,797	59.9	21,476	397	99	104.72	94	126	5

== Coaching career ==
=== Arena Football League ===
Gruden began his coaching career as the offensive coordinator for the AFL's Nashville Kats in 1997. In 1998, Gruden became head coach of the Orlando Predators, the main rival of the Storm. With Orlando, he won ArenaBowl titles in 1998 and 2000. Gruden came out of retirement and resumed playing in 2002, this time for the Predators, but retired again and returned to head coaching when his replacement, Fran Papasedero, died after the 2003 season. Gruden has an overall AFL head coaching record of 93–61 (.604), including a mark of 11–7 (.611) in the playoffs.

=== Tampa Bay Buccaneers ===
From 2002 to 2008, Gruden served as an offensive assistant for the Tampa Bay Buccaneers in the National Football League under his brother, head coach Jon Gruden, earning a Super Bowl ring for the Buccaneers' victory over the Oakland Raiders in Super Bowl XXXVII. Gruden left the team after his brother was fired following the 2008 season.

=== Florida Tuskers ===
In 2009, while the Predators were on hiatus during the bankruptcy reorganization of the AFL, Gruden was selected to be head coach Jim Haslett's offensive coordinator for the Florida Tuskers of the United Football League. As part of his contract, Gruden was not allowed to remain head coach of the Predators. Instead, former Orlando quarterback Pat O'Hara, who led the team to its two ArenaBowl titles when Gruden was head coach, was hired in his place.

On February 20, 2010, Gruden was named head coach of the Tuskers following Haslett's departure to join Mike Shanahan's staff with the NFL's Washington Redskins.

=== Cincinnati Bengals ===
On February 3, 2011, Gruden was hired as the offensive coordinator for the Cincinnati Bengals. On January 13, 2012, he signed a three-year extension with the Bengals at the position, even after being asked to interview for at least three NFL head coaching jobs (with the Jacksonville Jaguars, St. Louis Rams, and later turning down the Indianapolis Colts).

In January 2013, Gruden was interviewed by the NFL's Arizona Cardinals, Philadelphia Eagles, and San Diego Chargers for their vacant head coaching positions. Gruden's offense helped lead the Bengals to three straight Wild Card playoff appearances, including the AFC North title in 2013.

=== Washington Redskins ===
On January 9, 2014, Gruden was hired as the new head coach of the Washington Redskins, succeeding Mike Shanahan. Since Gruden was a highly sought-after coach, Redskins owner Dan Snyder gave him a fully guaranteed, five-year contract worth $20 million. Washington finished with a 4–12 in Gruden's first season in 2014.

In the 2015 season, Gruden led the Redskins to their first playoff appearance since 2012. The Redskins would go on a four-game winning streak to finish the season and win the NFC East with a 9–7 record. However, they lost to the Green Bay Packers in the wild-card round 35–18, ending their season. In 2016, the Redskins finished 8–7–1, but missed the playoffs. This marked the first time the team posted back-to-back winning seasons since the 1996 and 1997 seasons.

On March 4, 2017, Gruden signed a two-year contract extension with the team. In the 2017 season, he led the team to a 7–9 record. In the 2018 season, the team finished with a 7–9 record once again. On October 7, 2019, he was fired after starting the season with a 0–5 record, finishing his overall tenure with a 35–49–1 (.418) record.

=== Jacksonville Jaguars ===
On January 22, 2020, Gruden was hired by the Jacksonville Jaguars as their offensive coordinator under head coach Doug Marrone. Alongside Marrone and the rest of the team's coaches, he was fired after the team finished with a franchise-worst 1–15 record.

=== Los Angeles Rams ===
Gruden was as an offensive consultant with the Los Angeles Rams in 2022.

== Head coaching record ==
=== AFL ===
Team	Year	Regular season					Postseason			
Team	Year	Won	Lost	Ties	Win %	Finish	Won	Lost	Win %	Result
ORL	1998	9	5	0	.643	2nd Southern	3	0	0	ArenaBowl XII Champions
ORL	1999	7	7	0	.500	3rd Southern	2	1	0	Lost to Albany Firebirds in ArenaBowl XIII
ORL	2000	11	3	0	.786	3rd Southern	3	0	0	ArenaBowl XIV Champions
ORL	2001	8	6	0	.571	3rd Southern	0	1	0	Lost to Chicago Rush in Wild Card Game
ORL	2004	10	6	0	.625	2nd Southern	0	1	0	Lost to Chicago Rush in Quarterfinals
ORL	2005	10	6	0	.625	2nd Southern	1	1	0	Lost to Georgia Force in NC Final
ORL	2006	10	6	0	.625	1st Southern	2	1	0	Lost to Chicago Rush in ArenaBowl XX
ORL	2007	8	8	0	.500	3rd Southern	0	1	0	Lost to Philadelphia Soul in NC Wild Card Game
ORL	2008	9	7	0	.563	2nd Southern	0	1	0	Lost to Cleveland Gladiators in NC Wild Card Game
Total		82	54	0	.603		11	7	.611	

=== UFL ===
Team	Year	Regular season					Postseason			
Team	Year	Won	Lost	Ties	Win %	Finish	Won	Lost	Win %	Result
FL	2010	5	3	0	.625	2nd in UFL	0	1	0	Lost to Las Vegas Locos in 2010 UFL Championship Game
Total		5	3	0	.625		0	1	.000	

=== NFL ===
Team	Year	Regular season					Postseason			
Team	Year	Won	Lost	Ties	Win %	Finish	Won	Lost	Win %	Result
WAS	2014	4	12	0	.250	4th in NFC East	–	–	–	–
WAS	2015	9	7	0	.563	1st in NFC East	0	1	.000	Lost to Green Bay Packers in NFC Wild Card Game
WAS	2016	8	7	1	.531	3rd in NFC East	–	–	–	–
WAS	2017	7	9	0	.438	3rd in NFC East	–	–	–	–
WAS	2018	7	9	0	.438	3rd in NFC East	–	–	–	–
WAS	2019	0	5	0	.000	Fired	–	–	–	–
Total		35	49	1	.418		0	1	.000	

== Personal life ==
Gruden's father, Jim, a long-time college and NFL assistant coach, was a former regional scout for the San Francisco 49ers. His brother, Jon, was the head coach of the Las Vegas Raiders and the Tampa Bay Buccaneers, winning a Super Bowl in 2002. Gruden's other brother, James, is a radiologist at the University of North Carolina School of Medicine.
