= 1992 Charlotte Rage season =

Arena Football League team season

- General manager: Danny Petro
- Head coach: Babe Parilli
- Home stadium: Charlotte Coliseum

Results
- Record: 3–7
- Division place: 3rd
- Playoffs: Did not qualify

The 1992 Charlotte Rage season was the first for the Arena Football League (AFL) franchise. They were coached by Babe Parilli. The Rage finished 3–7 and failed to qualify for the playoffs.

== Regular season ==
=== Schedule ===
Week	Date	Opponent	Results		Game site
Week	Date	Opponent	Final score	Team record	Game site
1	May 30	New Orleans Night	W 43–23	1–0	Charlotte Coliseum
2	June 6	at Cleveland Thunderbolts	L 28–44	1–1	Richfield Coliseum
3	June 12	Tampa Bay Storm	L 37–39	1–2	Charlotte Coliseum
4	June 19	Dallas Texans	L 30–32	1–3	Charlotte Coliseum
5	June 27	at Orlando Predators	L 26–29	1–4	Orlando Arena
6	July 3	at Cincinnati Rockers	L 34–39	1–5	Riverfront Coliseum
7	July 10	Sacramento Attack	W 51–3	2–5	Charlotte Coliseum
8	July 28	at New Orleans Night	W 38–33	3–5	Louisiana Superdome
9	July 24	Orlando Predators	L 38–39	3–6	Charlotte Coliseum
10	August 1	at Tampa Bay Storm	L 32–39	3–7	Florida Suncoast Dome

=== Standings ===
1992 Arena Football League standings
Team	W	L	T	PCT	PF	PA	PF (Avg.)	PA (Avg.)	STK
Southern Division
xyz-Orlando Predators	9	1	0	.900	484	281	48.4	28.1	W 9
x-Tampa Bay Storm	9	1	0	.900	472	354	47.2	35.4	W 4
Charlotte Rage	3	7	0	.300	357	320	35.7	32	L 2
New Orleans Night	0	10	0	.000	258	491	25.8	49.1	L 10
Northern Division
xy-Detroit Drive	8	2	0	.800	497	314	49.7	31.4	W 6
x-Cincinnati Rockers	7	3	0	.700	451	350	45.1	35	L 1
x-Albany Firebirds	5	5	0	.500	422	416	42.2	41.6	L 4
x-Cleveland Thunderbolts	4	6	0	.400	311	362	31.1	36.2	W 1
Western Division
xy-Dallas Texans	5	5	0	.500	354	388	35.4	38.8	W 2
x-Sacramento Attack	4	6	0	.400	354	395	35.4	39.5	W 1
Arizona Rattlers	4	6	0	.400	324	420	32.4	42	L 1
San Antonio Force	2	8	0	.200	268	461	26.8	46.1	L 2

z – clinched homefield advantage

y – clinched division title

x – clinched playoff spot

== Roster ==
1992 Charlotte Rage roster
Quarterbacks: -- Andrew Molander; -- Joe Pizzo; Wide Receivers/Defensive Backs: -- Eric Andrade; -- Frank Bianchini; -- Ron Meadows; -- Chris Poston; -- Richard Smith; -- Carnell Wallace; -- Mike Wilpolt	Fullbacks/Linebackers: -- Les Barley; -- Garrett Washington; -- Melvin Waters; -- Mitchell Ward; Offensive Linemen/Defensive Linemen: -- Marlin Brown; -- Dennis Dahlke; -- Joe DeLamielleure; -- Eric Douglas; -- Sam Hernandez; -- Kubanai Kalombo; -- James Melton; -- Chuck Phifer	Wide Receiver/Linebackers: -- Ryan Bethea; -- Norman Floyd; -- Danny Smith; Kickers: -- Damon Hartman; -- Jim Power; Rookies in italics Roster updated March 29, 2013; 26 Active, 0 Inactive, 0 PS → More rosters
