= Broderick Sargent =

American football player (born 1962)

No. 39, 47
- Positions: Fullback, linebacker

Personal information
- Born: September 16, 1962 (age 64); Waxahachie, Texas, U.S.
- Listed height: 5 ft 11 in (1.80 m)
- Listed weight: 215 lb (98 kg)

Career information
- High school: Waxahachie
- College: Baylor
- NFL draft: 1986: undrafted

Career history
- St. Louis Cardinals (1986–1987); Dallas Cowboys (1989); Montreal Machine (1991); Detroit Drive (1992–1993); Las Vegas Sting (1995)*; Connecticut Coyotes (1995)*
- * Offseason or practice squad member only

Awards and highlights
- ArenaBowl champion (1992)

Career NFL statistics
- Rushing yards: 177
- Rushing average: 4.7
- Touchdowns: 1
- Stats at Pro Football Reference

Career AFL statistics
- Rushing yards: 524
- Rushing average: 3.4
- Touchdowns: 34
- Stats at ArenaFan.com

Broderick Lawrence Sargent (born September 16, 1962) is an American former professional football player who was a fullback in the National Football League (NFL) for the St. Louis Cardinals and Dallas Cowboys. He played college football for the Baylor Bears. He also played professionally for the Montreal Machine in the World League of American Football (WLAF), and the Detroit Drive in the Arena Football League (AFL).

== Early life ==
Sargent attended Waxahachie High School, where he played football, basketball and track (high jump). He accepted a football scholarship from Baylor University. As a senior, he registered 286 rushing yards on 70 carries and 138 receiving yards on 8 receptions. He finished his 5-year college career with 664 rushing yards on 164 carries and one touchdown.

== Professional career ==
=== St. Louis Cardinals ===
Sargent was signed as an undrafted free agent by the St. Louis Cardinals after the 1986 NFL draft on May 19. He played mainly on special teams.

In 1987, after the players went on a strike on the third week of the season, those contests were canceled (reducing the 16-game season to 15) and the NFL decided that the games would be played with replacement players. Sargent crossed the picket line to be a part of the Cardinals replacement team, that was given the mock name "Crudbirds" by the media. In the fourth game against the Washington Redskins, he posted 78 yards rushing, including 70 in the first half. He was waived on August 22, 1988.

=== Dallas Cowboys ===
In March 1989, he signed as a free agent with the Dallas Cowboys and began the season as the starting fullback (5 starts), until being passed on the depth chart by rookie Daryl Johnston. In the twelfth game against the Philadelphia Eagles, he was the team's leading rusher, including a career-long 43-yard run. On September 3, 1990, he was released after being passed on the depth chart by Tommie Agee for the backup fullback position.

Against Green Bay (12/24) he recorded a career-long 21-yard reception and had three receptions for the game, also a career-high. His one-yard scoring plunge against Miami (11/19) was the first touchdown of his NFL career. The following week Sargent recorded a career-long 43-yard run against Philadelphia and led the team in rushing.

=== Montreal Machine (WLAF) ===
In 1991, he was the starting fullback of the Montreal Machine of the World League of American Football, posting 36 carries for 83 rushing yards, 23 receptions for 209 receiving yards and one rushing touchdown.

=== Detroit Drive (AFL) ===
In 1992, he signed with the Detroit Drive of the Arena Football League and was one of the leading rushers in the league with 263 yards. The next year, he broke the league record with 20 rushing touchdowns and was one of the league's rushing leaders (261 yards), while helping the team win ArenaBowl VI.

=== Las Vegas Sting (AFL) ===
In 1995, he signed with the Las Vegas Sting of the Arena Football League. He was released on April 6.

=== Connecticut Coyotes (AFL) ===
On April 8, 1995, he was claimed off waivers by the Connecticut Coyotes of the Arena Football League. He was released before the start of the season.
