= 1992 Albany Firebirds season =

Arena Football League team season

- Head coach: Rick Buffington
- Home stadium: Knickerbocker Arena

Results
- Record: 5–5
- Division place: 3rd
- Playoffs: Lost 1st Round (Texans) 45-48

The 1992 Albany Firebirds season was the third season for the Firebirds. They finished 5–5 and lost in the 1st round of the AFL playoffs to the Dallas Texans.

== Regular season ==
=== Schedule ===
Week	Date	Opponent	Results		Game site	Ref
Week	Date	Opponent	Final score	Team record	Game site	Ref
1	May 30	Arizona Rattlers	W 62–35	1–0	Knickerbocker Arena	
2	June 6	Detroit Drive	L 23–33	1–1	Knickerbocker Arena	
3	June 13	at Dallas Texans	W 37–27	2–1	Reunion Arena	
4	June 20	at Cincinnati Rockers	W 45–44	3–1	Riverfront Coliseum	
5	June 27	Cleveland Thunderbolts	W 47–32	4–1	Knickerbocker Arena	
6	July 3	New Orleans Night	W 67–29	5–1	Knickerbocker Arena	
7	July 10	at Detroit Drive	L 34–58	5–2	Joe Louis Arena	
8	July 18	at Tampa Bay Storm	L 42–62	5–3	Florida Suncoast Dome	
9	July 25	Cincinnati Rockers	L 40–50	5–4	Knickerbocker Arena	
10	August 3	at Cleveland Thunderbolts	L 25–46	5–5	Richfield Coliseum	

=== Standings ===
1992 Arena Football League standings
Team	W	L	T	PCT	PF	PA	PF (Avg.)	PA (Avg.)	STK
Southern Division
xyz-Orlando Predators	9	1	0	.900	484	281	48.4	28.1	W 9
x-Tampa Bay Storm	9	1	0	.900	472	354	47.2	35.4	W 4
Charlotte Rage	3	7	0	.300	357	320	35.7	32	L 2
New Orleans Night	0	10	0	.000	258	491	25.8	49.1	L 10
Northern Division
xy-Detroit Drive	8	2	0	.800	497	314	49.7	31.4	W 6
x-Cincinnati Rockers	7	3	0	.700	451	350	45.1	35	L 1
x-Albany Firebirds	5	5	0	.500	422	416	42.2	41.6	L 4
x-Cleveland Thunderbolts	4	6	0	.400	311	362	31.1	36.2	W 1
Western Division
xy-Dallas Texans	5	5	0	.500	354	388	35.4	38.8	W 2
x-Sacramento Attack	4	6	0	.400	354	395	35.4	39.5	W 1
Arizona Rattlers	4	6	0	.400	324	420	32.4	42	L 1
San Antonio Force	2	8	0	.200	268	461	26.8	46.1	L 2

z – clinched homefield advantage

y – clinched division title

x – clinched playoff spot

== Playoffs ==
Round	Date	Opponent	Results		Game site
Round	Date	Opponent	Final score	Team record	Game site
1	August 8	Dallas Texans	L 45–48	0–1	Knickerbocker Arena

== Roster ==
1992 Albany Firebirds roster
Quarterbacks: 8 Tom Porras; -- Mike Rhodes; -- Ed Rubbert; Wide Receivers/Defensive Backs: -- John Chaney; -- Eric Hoskins; -- Ozzie Jackson; -- Myron Jefferson; 27 Merv Mosely; -- Alfred Parker; -- B. T. Thompson; -- Steve Thonn; -- Willie Wood, Jr.	Running Backs/Linebackers: -- Aric Anderson; -- Eldridge Avery; -- Jeff Blankenship; Offensive Linemen/Defensive Linemen: 77 Sylvester Bembery; -- Jeff Neal; 73 Pete Porcelli; -- Rodney Smith; -- Mitch Suplee; -- Jim Warne; -- Ricky Wells; -- Isaac Williams	Wide Receivers/Linebackers: -- Chris Dugan; 84 Fred Gayles; -- Darryl Hammond; -- Tony Missick; Kickers: -- Gary Gussman; Rookies in italics; Roster updated April 3, 2013; 28 Active, 0 Inactive, 0 PS

== Awards ==
Position	Player	Award	All-Arena team
Offensive/Defensive Lineman	Sylvester Bembery	none	1st
Wide Receiver/Defensive Back	Merv Mosely	none	1st
