= David Caldwell (nose tackle) =

American football player (born 1965)

No. 73, 55
- Position: Defensive tackle

Personal information
- Born: February 28, 1965 (age 61); Bay City, Texas, U.S.
- Listed height: 6 ft 3 in (1.91 m)
- Listed weight: 285 lb (129 kg)

Career information
- High school: San Antonio (TX) Highlands
- College: TCU
- NFL draft: 1987: undrafted

Career history
- Green Bay Packers (1987); Los Angeles Raiders (1988–1989)*; London Monarchs (1991); San Antonio Force (1992); Albany Firebirds (1993–1996); New York CityHawks (1997); Grand Rapids Rampage (1998); Houston ThunderBears (1999); Buffalo Destroyers (2000–2002)
- * Offseason or practice squad member only

Career NFL statistics
- Sacks: 0.5
- Stats at Pro Football Reference

Career AFL statistics
- Tackles: 86
- Sacks: 20
- Passes defended: 11
- Forced fumbles: 5
- Fumbles recoveries: 3
- Stats at ArenaFan.com

David Anthony Caldwell (born February 28, 1965) is an American former professional football player who was a nose tackle in the National Football League (NFL) and the Arena Football League (AFL). He played college football for the TCU Horned Frogs.

== Early life ==
Caldwell was born in Bay City, Texas.

== Career ==
Caldwell played with the Green Bay Packers during the 1987 NFL season. He played at the collegiate level at Texas Christian University. Caldwell re-signed with the Buffalo Destroyers on March 22, 2002.
