= Merv Mosely =

American football player (born 1966)

Merv Mosley
Profile
- Positions: Wide receiver, defensive back

Personal information
- Born: October 31, 1966 (age 60)
- Listed height: 6 ft 0 in (1.83 m)
- Listed weight: 175 lb (79 kg)

Career information
- High school: Waterford (Waterford, Connecticut)
- College: Western Connecticut State
- NFL draft: 1989: undrafted

Career history
- Albany Firebirds (1990–1992); Connecticut Coyotes (1995)

Awards and highlights
- First-team All-Arena (1992); Second-team All-Arena (1991)

Career AFL statistics
- Receptions: 51
- Receiving yards: 675
- Receiving TDs: 11
- Tackles: 214
- Interceptions: 28
- Stats at ArenaFan.com

Merv Mosely (born October 31, 1966) is an American former professional football player who played four seasons in the Arena Football League (AFL) with the Albany Firebirds and Connecticut Coyotes. He played college football at Western Connecticut State University.

== Early life and college ==
Merv Mosely was born on October 31, 1966. He attended Waterford High School in Waterford, Connecticut.

Mosely played college football for the Western Connecticut State Colonials of Western Connecticut State University. He helped Western Connecticut State advance to the 1985 NCAA Division III playoffs. He garnered preseason All-American recognition in 1987. Mosely had a school-record three interceptions in a game against the Trenton State Lions in 1988. He graduated in 1988. He was inducted into the school's athletics hall of fame in 2024.

== Professional career ==
Mosely played in all eight games for the Albany Firebirds of the Arena Football League (AFL) in 1990, recording 25 receptions for 289 yards and five touchdowns, 28 solo tackles, 11 assisted tackles, six interceptions, and five pass breakups. The Firebirds finished the season with a 3–5 record. Mosely was a wide receiver/defensive back during his time in the AFL as the league played under ironman rules. He appeared in all ten games during the 1991 season, totaling 26 catches for 386 yards and six touchdowns, 50 solo tackles, five assisted tackles, one forced fumble, eight pass breakups, five interceptions, and ten kick returns for 137 yards. He was named second-team All-Arena for his performance during the 1991 season. Albany finished the year with a 6–4 record, and lost in the first round of the playoffs to the Detroit Drive by a score of 37–35. Mosely played in all ten games for the second consecutive season in 1992, accumulating 62 solo tackles, 14 assisted tackles, one fumble recovery, eight pass breakups, and nine interceptions. He earned first-team All-Arena honors for the 1992 season as the Firebirds went 5–5 and lost to the Dallas Texans in the first round of the playoffs.

On December 13, 1994, Mosely was selected by his home-state Connecticut Coyotes with the first overall pick in the 1994 AFL expansion draft. Prior to being drafted, he was studying for his master's degree in social work and urban studies at Southern Connecticut State University, and also working as a clinician with Dixwell/Newhallville Mental Health in New Haven, Connecticut. He appeared in all 12 games for the Coyotes in 1995, recording 55 solo tackles, eight assisted tackles, one fumble recovery, nine pass breakups, and eight interceptions. The Coyotes finished with a 1–11 record. Despite only playing four seasons in the AFL, his 28 career interceptions were the second most in league history at the time.
