= Florida Bobcats =

Arena football team

Logo

General information
- Founded: 1992
- Folded: 2001
- Headquartered: National Car Rental Center in Sunrise, Florida
- Colors: Black, teal, and silver

Personnel
- Owners: Dr. Michael Gelfand; Scott Atkins
- Head coach: Dave Ewart

Team history
- Sacramento Attack (1992); Miami Hooters (1993–1995); Florida Bobcats (1996–2001)

Home fields
- ARCO Arena (1992); Miami Arena (1993–1995); West Palm Beach Auditorium (1996–1998); National Car Rental Center (1999–2001)

League / conference affiliations
- Arena Football League (1992–2001): Western Division (1992); National Conference (1993–2001); Southern Division (1995–2001)

Playoff appearances (2)
- 1992, 1993

The Florida Bobcats were an Arena Football League (AFL) team based in Sunrise, Florida. They were previously known as the Sacramento Attack and the Miami Hooters, and played in the AFL for a total of ten seasons, the last seven in West Palm Beach and Sunrise in the Miami metropolitan area.

The team was founded in 1992 as the Sacramento Attack, based in Sacramento, California. After their first season they relocated to Miami as the Miami Hooters, so named through a marketing deal with the restaurant chain Hooters. After three seasons the Hooters sponsorship was dropped and the team moved north to Sunrise where it changed its name. They folded after the 2001 season after years of weak attendance and poor performance. During their run they made two playoff appearances, once in Sacramento and once in Miami.

== History ==
=== Sacramento Attack (1992) ===
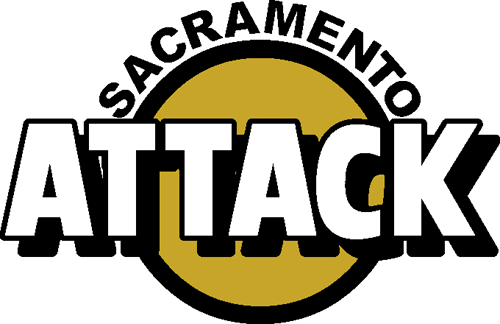

The Sacramento Attack was an Arena Football League team that competed under that name in the 1992 AFL season only. They played at ARCO Arena (later Sleep Train Arena) for that season. The team was originally supposed to play in Los Angeles as the Los Angeles Wings, but the franchise never came into existence in Los Angeles, and moved to Sacramento, California as the Attack.

=== Miami Hooters (1993–1995) ===
After their inaugural season, the team relocated to Miami, Florida. They took the name Miami Hooters in an unusual marketing arrangement with the Florida-based restaurant chain Hooters, which was ordinarily more noted for its buxom waitresses than feats of athletic prowess. Naturally, the team adopted the restaurant's owlish logo and trademark colors as its own for three years, until this unusual arrangement terminated after the completion of the 1995 season. Desirous of staying in the general South Florida area, the team relocated to West Palm Beach as the Florida Bobcats. Subsequent linking of team names with products was to occur, notably the AFL's own New Jersey Red Dogs (named for a Miller-owned beer brand), the Toronto Phantoms (named for Phantom Industries, a manufacturer of women's hosiery), the Los Angeles Kiss (named for the band Kiss, which owned the team) and the Detroit Neon of the Continental Indoor Soccer League. Originally the team was to be named the Miami Toros or Miami Bulls, with a similar logo for each name having been created.

=== Florida Bobcats (1996–2001) ===
When the Miami Hooters team discontinued its connection with the Hooters Restaurant chain after the 1995 season, it developed both a new identity (the Bobcats) and a new color scheme involving teal and black as opposed to the former orange and brown associated with the restaurants. It also moved north to West Palm Beach in an attempt to reduce overhead. This proved to be a mixed blessing at best, however, as the relatively tiny seating capacity of the West Palm Beach Auditorium (around 6,000) made profitable operations essentially impossible. In the 1997 and 1998 seasons the team played a total of five official league games at neutral sites (in Ottawa, Boston, Los Angeles, Kansas City and Lakeland, Florida), drawing an average crowd of 5,365—quite an improvement over the 3,446 per game they drew in their thirteen games in West Palm Beach. This led to some wags referring to Bobcats as "America's Team", an ironic comparison to the National Football League's Dallas Cowboys.

In 1999, the Bobcats moved into the far more spacious confines of the National Car Rental Center, also home to the Florida Panthers of the National Hockey League. Despite having over 20,000 seats in the new arena, the Bobcats attendance did not improve—it actually dropped to an average of 3,424 in 21 home games. (The Bobcats even set the AFL all-time low attendance mark, when only 1,154 fans watched them beat the Los Angeles Avengers, 61-53, on May 3, 2001.) The club remained there until the team was folded after the completion of the 2001 season. One of the notable facts about this team is that they were quarterbacked through the majority of their existence by Fred McNair, the original "Air McNair" and older brother of 2003 NFL co-MVP Steve McNair. An attempt was made in the 2001 season to sell the team to various prospective owners, including Mark Cuban, who later bought the Dallas Mavericks of the NBA, but nothing came of the deal.

== Season-by-season ==
ArenaBowl champions	ArenaBowl appearance	Division champions	Playoff berth

Season	League	Conference	Division	Regular season			Postseason results
Season	League	Conference	Division	Finish	Wins	Losses	Postseason results
Sacramento Attack
1992	AFL	—	Western	2nd	4	6	Lost Quarterfinals (Detroit) 48–23
Miami Hooters
1993	AFL	National	—	4th	5	7	Lost Quarterfinals (Orlando) 41–13
1994	AFL	National	—	5th	5	7	
1995	AFL	National	Southern	3rd	1	11	
Florida Bobcats
1996	AFL	National	Southern	3rd	6	8	
1997	AFL	National	Southern	3rd	4	10	
1998	AFL	National	Southern	4th	3	11	
1999	AFL	National	Southern	4th	3	11	
2000	AFL	National	Southern	4th	3	11	
2001	AFL	National	Southern	4th	6	8	
Total					40	90	(includes only regular season)
Total					0	2	(includes only the postseason)
Total					40	92	(includes both regular season and postseason)

== Notable players ==
=== Arena Football Hall of Famers ===
Florida Bobcats Hall of Famers
No.	Name	Year inducted	Position(s)	Years w/ Attack, Hooters or Bobcats
--	John Corker	2002	OL/DL	1994–1995
--	Joe March	2000	OL/DL	1992–1993
--	Jon Roehlk	1999	OL/DL	1994

=== All-Arena players ===
The following Attack/Hooters/Bobcats players were named to All-Arena Teams:

- WR/DB Bernard Edwards (1)
- WR/LB Niu Sale (1), Bruce LaSane (1)
- OL/DL Alo Sila (1)
- DS Donald Brown (1)

=== All-Ironman players ===
The following Attack/Hooters/Bobcats players were named to All-Ironman Teams:

- WR/LB Curtis Ceaser, Jr. (1)

=== All-Rookie players ===
The following Attack/Hooters/Bobcats players were named to All-Rookie Teams:

- WR/LB Curtis Ceaser, Jr.
- WR/DB Neal Stayton

== Head coaches ==
Name	Term	Regular season				Playoffs		Awards	Reference
Name	Term	W	L	T	Win%	W	L	Awards	Reference
Joe Kapp	1992	4	6	0	.400	0	1		
Don Strock	1993	5	7	0	.417	0	1		
Jimmy Dunn	1994	5	7	0	.417	0	0		
John Fourcade	1995	1	11	0	.083	0	0		
Jim Jensen	1996	6	8	0	.429	0	0		
Babe Parilli	1997	4	10	0	.286	0	0		
Rick Buffington	1998	3	11	0	.214	0	0		
Bruce Hardy	1999	3	11	0	.214	0	0		
Dave Ewart	2000–2001	9	19	0	.321	0	0		
