= Alo Sila =

American football player

No. 73
- Position: Offensive lineman / Defensive lineman

Personal information
- Listed height: 6 ft 0 in (1.83 m)
- Listed weight: 275 lb (125 kg)

Career information
- College: Cal State Northridge
- NFL draft: 1992: undrafted

Career history
- Sacramento Attack/Miami Hooters (1992–1993); San Jose SaberCats (1995)

Awards and highlights
- First-team All-Arena (1992)
- Stats at ArenaFan.com

Alo Sila is an American former professional football lineman who played three seasons in the Arena Football League (AFL) with the Sacramento Attack/Miami Hooters and San Jose SaberCats. He played college football at San Jose City College and California State University, Northridge.

== College career ==
Sila first played college football at San Jose City College as a linebacker. He transferred to California State University, Northridge and lettered for the Matadors from 1990 to 1991 as a defensive lineman. On October 13, 1990, with the game against the Southern Utah State Thunderbirds tied 17–17 early in the fourth quarter, Sila scored a 33-yard interception return touchdown, helping the 1990 Matadors win 34–24 and continue their school-record winning streak.

== Professional career ==
After going undrafted in the 1992 NFL draft, Sila played in all 10 games for the Sacramento Attack of the Arena Football League (AFL) in 1992, recording 11 solo tackles, one assisted tackle, eight sacks, one forced fumble, one pass breakup, and three blocked kicks, earning first-team All-Arena honors as an offensive lineman/defensive lineman. He played both offense and defense in the AFL as the league played under ironman rules. In 1993, the Hooters restaurant chain purchased the Attack and moved the team to Miami, Florida, renaming them the Miami Hooters. He played in nine games for the Hooters during the 1993 season, totaling three solo tackles, two sacks, one pass breakup, and four blocked kicks. While with the Attack/Hooters, Sila was a member of an informal group of Polynesian players on the team called "The Committee", which included Niu Sale, George Fua, Richard Ane, Junior Ili, Ken Sale, and Kaiser Noa at several points in time. The group appeared in various promotions and visited hospitals. The Committee named the van they drove in "The Canoe".

Sila appeared in four games for the AFL's San Jose SaberCats in 1995, accumulating one assisted tackle and three pass breakups.
