= Ken Lutz =

American football player (born 1965)

Profile
- Position: Quarterback

Personal information
- Born: December 11, 1965 (age 60)
- Listed height: 6 ft 0 in (1.83 m)
- Listed weight: 185 lb (84 kg)

Career information
- High school: Royal (Simi Valley, California)
- College: San Jose State
- NFL draft: 1989: undrafted

Career history
- Columbus Thunderbolts (1991); San Antonio Force (1992)

Career AFL statistics
- Comp. / Att.: 111 / 219
- Passing yards: 1,291
- TD–INT: 18–13
- Rushing yards: 158
- Rushing TDs: 4
- Stats at ArenaFan.com

Ken Lutz (born December 11, 1965) is an American former professional football quarterback who played two seasons in the Arena Football League (AFL) with the Columbus Thunderbolts and San Antonio Force. He played college football at Moorpark College and San Jose State University.

== Early life and college ==
Ken Lutz was born on December 11, 1965. He attended Royal High School in Simi Valley, California.

Lutz first played college football at Moorpark College. He was a two-year letterman for the San Jose State Spartans of San Jose State University from 1987 to 1988. He completed one of four passes for 11 yards in 1987. In 1988, Lutz recorded 199 completions on 321 passing attempts (62.0%) for 2,547 yards, 16 touchdowns, and 19 interceptions while also rushing for two touchdowns. His 62.0 completion percentage, 7.9 yards per pass attempt, and 133.3 passer rating were the highest in the Big West Conference.

== Professional career ==
Lutz played in seven games for the Columbus Thunderbolts of the Arena Football League (AFL) in 1991, primarily as the backup to Major Harris, and completed 20 of 44 passes (45.5%) for 226 yards, two touchdowns, and five interceptions while scoring one rushing touchdown.

On March 27, 1992, Lutz was the first pick of the San Antonio Force in the 1992 AFL expansion draft. He was the starting quarterback for the Force during the 1992 season, completing 91 of 175 passes (52.0%) for 1,065 yards, 16 touchdowns, and eight interceptions while also rushing for three touchdowns. On June 13, 1992, Lutz was the Force's quarterback during the 50–0 loss to the Orlando Predators, which is the only shutout in AFL history. He "blew out" his knee on July 18, 1992, against the Dallas Texans and missed the final two games of the year. The Force finished the season with a 2–8 record.

== Personal life ==
Lutz has spent time working as a private investigator.
