= Jorge Cimadevilla =

American football player (born 1965)

No. 17
- Position: Placekicker

Personal information
- Born: November 11, 1965 (age 60); Los Angeles, California, U.S.
- Listed height: 6 ft 0 in (1.83 m)
- Listed weight: 200 lb (91 kg)

Career information
- College: East Tennessee State (1983–1986)
- NFL draft: 1987: undrafted

Career history
- Houston Oilers (1989)*; Orlando Predators (1992–1994); Tampa Bay Storm (1995–1996); Nashville Kats (1997–1998)
- * Offseason or practice squad member only

Awards and highlights
- 2× ArenaBowl champion (1995, 1996); 2× First-team All-Arena (1992, 1994); All-ArenaBowl Team (1999)

Career AFL statistics
- FG made: 67
- FG att: 189
- PAT made: 413
- PAT att: 483
- Tackles: 43
- Stats at ArenaFan.com

Jorge Cimadevilla (born November 11, 1965) is an American former professional football placekicker who played seven seasons in the Arena Football League (AFL) with the Orlando Predators, Tampa Bay Storm and Nashville Kats. He played college football at East Tennessee State University.

== Early life ==
Jorge Cimadevilla was born on November 11, 1965, in Los Angeles, California. He was raised in the Atlanta, Georgia area. Cimadevilla played college football for the East Tennessee State Buccaneers of East Tennessee State University, and was a four-year letterman from 1983 to 1986. He was a punter his first three seasons and a placekicker in his final season. Cimadevilla earned Kodak All-American honors in college.

== Professional career ==
Cimadevilla went undrafted in the 1987 NFL draft. He signed with the Houston Oilers of the National Football League in May 1989. He was waived on August 29, 1989.

Cimadevilla was working in institutional food sales when he was approached by Orlando Predators head coach Les Moss about playing in the Arena Football League (AFL). Cimadevilla played in all ten games for the Predators in 1992, converting 13 of 34 field goals and 50 of 59 extra points while also recording four solo tackles, one assisted tackle, and one fumble recovery. The Predators finished the year with a 9–1 record and lost in ArenaBowl VI to the Detroit Drive by a score of 56–38. Cimadevilla was named first-team All-Arena for his performance during the 1992 season. He appeared in all 12 games in 1993, totaling nine of 34 field goals, 57 of 66 extra points, and six solo tackles. Orlando finished the season 10–2 and lost in the semifinals to the Tampa Bay Storm 55–52. Cimadevilla played in all 12 games for the second consecutive season in 1994, recording six of 18 field goals, 66 of 77 extra points, five solo tackles, and one assisted tackle. The Predators went 11–1 and lost in ArenaBowl VIII to the Arizona Rattlers by a score of 36–31. Cimadevilla earned first-team All-Arena recognition for the 1994 season.

In December 1994, Cimadevilla was selected by the Tampa Bay Storm in an expansion draft. He had planned on retiring before being drafted by the Storm. Cimadevilla appeared in all 12 games for the third straight year in 1995, making 14 of 33 field goals and 69 of 79 extra points, as the Storm finished the season with a 10–2 record. On September 1, 1995, they won ArenaBowl IX against Cimadevilla's former team, the Predators, by a margin of 38–35. Cimadevilla played in all 14 games for Tampa Bay during the 1996 season, totaling six of 27 field goals, 74 of 89 extra points, nine solo tackles, and one assisted tackle. The Storm went 12–2 and won the ArenaBowl for the second consecutive season, defeating the Iowa Barnstormers in ArenaBowl X by a score of 42–38.

In November 1996, Cimadevilla was selected by the Nashville Kats in an expansion draft. Cimadevilla, who was the AFL's all-time leading scorer at the time, was booed by Kats fans after going zero for four on field goals in a 1997 preseason game despite also making seven of seven extra points, with Cimadevilla stating "I expect to hear boos... especially in a new city that doesn't understand this game. They [fans] tend to forget the uprights are only 9 feet wide and they're expecting you to make, if not everything, a lot." The Tennessean noted that the AFL field goal average was only 41% in 1996. Cimadevilla appeared in all 14 regular season games for the second straight year in 1997, recording 13 of 32 field goals, 81 of 96 extra points, 12 solo tackles, and one assisted tackle. The Kats finished 10–4 and lost in the quarterfinals to Cimadevilla's former team, the Storm. He played in three games during his final AFL season in 1998, converting six of 11 field goals and 16 of 17 extra points. He missed most of the 1998 season due to a groin injury. In 1999, Cimadevilla was named the kicker on the all-time All-ArenaBowl team.

== Post-playing career ==
Cimadevilla spent time as an assistant coach in the AFL, an assistant general manager in the af2, a sponsorship sales executive in the XFL, and the director of corporate sponsorships for the Georgia Force.
