= San Antonio Force =

Arena football team

Logo

General information
- Founded: 1992
- Folded: 1992
- Headquartered: HemisFair Arena in San Antonio, Texas
- Colors: Red, black, and silver
- Mascot: Swoop

Personnel
- Owner: Red McCombs
- Head coach: Dick Nolan

Team history
- San Antonio Force (1992)

Home fields
- HemisFair Arena (1992)

League / conference affiliations
- Arena Football League (1992): Western Division (1992)

The San Antonio Force were a professional arena football team based in San Antonio, Texas. The team was a member of the Arena Football League that competed in the 1992 season only. The team owner of the Force was Red McCombs. The team's colors were black, red and silver.

== History ==
The Force played their home games at HemisFair Arena, then the home of the San Antonio Spurs. They set two records for futility, becoming the first arena football team ever to be shut out in a game, losing to the Orlando Predators 50–0 on June 13, 1992, and the all-time lowest record for field goal percentage in a season, 11.8% (4–34), among three different kickers. The team ceased operations upon the completion of the season, citing that there were not enough available dates at HemisFair Arena or the Alamodome for the team to host games. There was an attempt by Marc Reich to bring the team to Hartford, Connecticut, but he was unable to convince the city to purchase the rights to the Force, as it was believed there wasn't a high enough return on investment. Arena football returned to San Antonio in 2012 when the Tulsa Talons franchise relocated to the Alamodome.

== Notable players ==
=== Final roster ===
1992 San Antonio Force roster
Quarterbacks: -- Ken Lutz; -- Jason Palumbis; Wide receivers/Defensive backs: -- Jorrick Battle; -- James Harvey; -- Alvin Horn; -- Steve Shelly; -- John Simpson; -- Warren Stewart; -- Charlie Thompson	Fullbacks/Linebackers: -- Smiley Elmore; -- James Greene; Offensive linemen/Defensive linemen: -- David Caldwell; -- Keithen DeGrate; -- Duane Duncum; -- Tracy Gordon; -- Dave Opfar; -- Rodney Serpa; -- Doug Robb; -- Greg Ross; -- Dante Williams	Wide receiver/Linebackers: -- Anthony Cooney; -- Anthony Faldyn; -- Victor Scott; -- Steve Stutsman; Kickers: -- Matt Frantz; -- Tim Lasher; -- Scott Segrist; Rookies in italics Roster updated March 26, 2013; 27 Active, 0 Inactive, 0 PS

== Head coaches ==
Name	Term	Regular season				Playoffs		Awards
Name	Term	W	L	T	Win%	W	L	Awards
Dick Nolan	1992	2	8	0	.200	0	0	

== Season results ==
ArenaBowl champions	ArenaBowl appearance	Division champions	Playoff berth

Season	League	Conference	Division	Regular season			Postseason results
Season	League	Conference	Division	Finish	Wins	Losses	Postseason results
San Antonio Force
1992	AFL	-	Western	4th	2	8	
Total					2	8	(includes only regular season)
Total					0	0	(includes only the postseason)
Total					2	8	(includes both regular season and postseason)

== Media ==
- The team appeared on the game EA Sports Arena Football as a hidden bonus team.
- The first player drafted in 1992 by the Force was OL/DL David A. Caldwell, who was second on the team with 5.0 sacks. Caldwell is a San Antonio resident and currently coaching football in San Antonio ISD.
