= 1992 Arena Football League season =

- League: Arena Football League
- Sport: Arena football
- Duration: May 30, 1992 – August 3, 1992

Regular season
- Season champions: Orlando Predators
- Season MVP: Jay Gruden, TB

League postseason
- 1 vs 4 Semifinals champions: Orlando Predators
- 1 vs 4 Semifinals runners-up: Tampa Bay Storm
- 2 vs 3 Semifinals champions: Detroit Drive
- 2 vs 3 Semifinals runners-up: Dallas Texans

ArenaBowl VI
- Champions: Detroit Drive
- Runners-up: Orlando Predators
- Finals MVP: George LaFrance, DET

AFL seasons
- ← 1991 1993 →

Western, Northern, Southern

The 1992 Arena Football League season was the sixth season of the Arena Football League (AFL). The league champions were the Detroit Drive, who defeated the Orlando Predators in ArenaBowl VI.

It is during the 1992 season that the first shutout in AFL history occurred. On June 13, the Orlando Predators defeated the San Antonio Force by a score of 50–0. To date, this remains the only shutout in AFL history, though there were other shutouts in the former AF2 after this. It also marked the first appearance of separate divisions in Arena football history.

== Team movement ==
Five expansion teams joined the league: the Arizona Rattlers, Charlotte Rage, Cincinnati Rockers, Sacramento Attack, and the San Antonio Force.

Meanwhile, the Columbus Thunderbolts moved to Cleveland, Ohio and the Denver Dynamite suspended operations.

== Standings ==
1992 Arena Football League standings
| Team | W | L | T | PCT | PF | PA | PF (Avg.) | PA (Avg.) | STK |
|---|---|---|---|---|---|---|---|---|---|
Southern Division
| xyz-Orlando Predators | 9 | 1 | 0 | .900 | 484 | 281 | 48.4 | 28.1 | W 9 |
| x-Tampa Bay Storm | 9 | 1 | 0 | .900 | 472 | 354 | 47.2 | 35.4 | W 4 |
| Charlotte Rage | 3 | 7 | 0 | .300 | 357 | 320 | 35.7 | 32 | L 2 |
| New Orleans Night | 0 | 10 | 0 | .000 | 258 | 491 | 25.8 | 49.1 | L 10 |
Northern Division
| xy-Detroit Drive | 8 | 2 | 0 | .800 | 497 | 314 | 49.7 | 31.4 | W 6 |
| x-Cincinnati Rockers | 7 | 3 | 0 | .700 | 451 | 350 | 45.1 | 35 | L 1 |
| x-Albany Firebirds | 5 | 5 | 0 | .500 | 422 | 416 | 42.2 | 41.6 | L 4 |
| x-Cleveland Thunderbolts | 4 | 6 | 0 | .400 | 311 | 362 | 31.1 | 36.2 | W 1 |
Western Division
| xy-Dallas Texans | 5 | 5 | 0 | .500 | 354 | 388 | 35.4 | 38.8 | W 2 |
| x-Sacramento Attack | 4 | 6 | 0 | .400 | 354 | 395 | 35.4 | 39.5 | W 1 |
| Arizona Rattlers | 4 | 6 | 0 | .400 | 324 | 420 | 32.4 | 42 | L 1 |
| San Antonio Force | 2 | 8 | 0 | .200 | 268 | 461 | 26.8 | 46.1 | L 2 |

z – clinched homefield advantage

y – clinched division title

x – clinched playoff spot

== Playoffs ==
Quarterfinals
1 | Orlando | 50
8 | Cleveland | 12
4 | Tampa Bay | 41
5 | Cincinnati | 36
2 | Detroit | 48
7 | Sacramento | 23
6 | Albany | 45
3 | Dallas | 48

Semifinals
1 | Orlando (OT) | 24
4 | Tampa Bay | 21
2 | Detroit | 57
3 | Dallas | 14

ArenaBowl VI
1 | Orlando | 38
2 | Detroit | 56

== Awards and honors ==
=== Regular season awards ===
| Award | Winner | Position | Team |
|---|---|---|---|
| Most Valuable Player | Jay Gruden | Quarterback | Tampa Bay Storm |
| Ironman of the Year | Barry Wagner | Wide receiver/Defensive back | Orlando Predators |
| Coach of the Year | Perry Moss | Head coach | Orlando Predators |
| Executive of the Year | Eric Leins | Director of Operations | Orlando Predators |
| President's Award | Gary Vitto | General Manager | Detroit Drive |

=== All-Arena team ===
| Position | First team |
|---|---|
| Quarterback | Jay Gruden, Tampa Bay |
| Fullback/Linebacker | Alvin Rettig, Detroit |
| Wide receiver/Defensive back | Barry Wagner, Orlando; Gary Compton, Dallas; Merv Mosely, Albany |
| Offensive specialist/Kick returner | Stevie Thomas, Tampa Bay |
| Offensive lineman/Defensive lineman | Sylvester Bembery, Albany; Alo Sila, Sacramento; D'artagain Wise, New Orleans |
| Defensive specialist | Durwood Roquemore, Orlando |
| Kicker | Jorge Cimadevilla, Orlando |
