= ArenaBowl VI =

Detroit Drive (2nd)	Orlando Predators (1st)
56	38
	1	2	3	4	Total
DET	7	21	14	14	56
ORL	6	17	0	15	38
- Date: August 22, 1992
- Stadium: Orlando Arena; Orlando, Florida
- MVP: George LaFrance, OS, Detroit: Flint Fleming, OL/DL, Detroit (Ironman of the Game)
- Attendance: 13,680
- Winning coach: Tim Marcum
- Losing coach: Perry Moss

TV in the United States
- Network: ESPN
- Announcers: Craig Bolerjack, Rick 'Doc' Walker

ArenaBowl '92 (or ArenaBowl VI) was the Arena Football League's sixth ArenaBowl. The game featured the #2 Detroit Drive (8–2) against the #1 Orlando Predators (9–1). Earlier in the regular season, these two teams met with the Predators winning 50–49 in the "Miracle Minute."

== Game summary ==
In the first quarter, the Predators struck first with Kicker Jorge Cimadevilla getting a 48-yard Field Goal. The Drive responded with FB/LB Broderick Sargent getting a one-yard touchdown run. Afterwards, Orlando responded with Cimadevilla kicking a 36-yard Field Goal.

In the second quarter, Cimadevilla went right back to work for the Predators with a 26-yard field goal, yet Detroit came right back with WR/DB Rodney McSwain recovering an Orlando fumble in the endzone for a touchdown. Afterwards, the Predators responded with Quarterback Ben Bennett completing an eight-yard touchdown pass to OL/DL Eric Drakes. Immediately after Orlando's score, the Drive struck again with OS George LaFrance returning a kickoff 57 yards for a touchdown. Afterwards, the Predators closed out the half with Bennett completing an 8-yard TD pass to WR/DB Carl Aikens.

In the third quarter, Detroit started taking control with OL/DL Flint Fleming getting a one-yard touchdown run, while Quarterback Gilbert Renfroe completed a 24-yard touchdown pass to LaFrance.

In the fourth quarter, Orlando tried to fight back with Cimadevilla nailing a 31-yard Field Goal, yet Detroit replied with Renfroe completing a 15-yard touchdown pass to Langeloh (the kicker). The Predators tried to answer back with Bennett completing a 20-yard touchdown pass to WR/DB Herkie Walls (with a failed PAT), yet the Drive answered with Renfroe completing a 17-yard touchdown pass to WR/DB Gary Mullen. Afterwards, all that was left of Orlando's comeback was Bennett's seven-yard touchdown pass to WR/LB Bryan Moore.

With the win, Detroit won its fourth ArenaBowl title in five seasons.

== Scoring summary ==
1st Quarter

- ORL – FG Cimadevilla 48
- DET – Sargent 1 run (Langeloh kick)
- ORL – FG Cimadevilla 36

2nd Quarter

- ORL – FG Cimadevilla 26
- DET – McSwain 0 Fumble Recovery (Langeloh kick)
- ORL – Drakes 8 pass from Bennett (Cimadevilla kick)
- DET – LaFrance 57 Kickoff Return (Langeloh kick)
- ORL – Aikens 8 pass from Bennett (Cimadevilla kick)

3rd Quarter

- DET – Fleming 1 run (Langeloh kick)
- DET – LaFrance 24 pass from Renfroe (Langeloh kick)

4th Quarter

- ORL – FG Cimadevilla 31
- DET – Langeloh 15 from Renfroe (Langeloh kick)
- ORL – Walls 20 pass from Bennett (Cimadevilla kick failed)
- DET – Mullen 17 pass from Renfroe (Langeloh kick)
- ORL – Moore 7 pass from Bennett (Schlichter pass failed)
