= Tackle (gridiron football position) =

American and Canadian football position

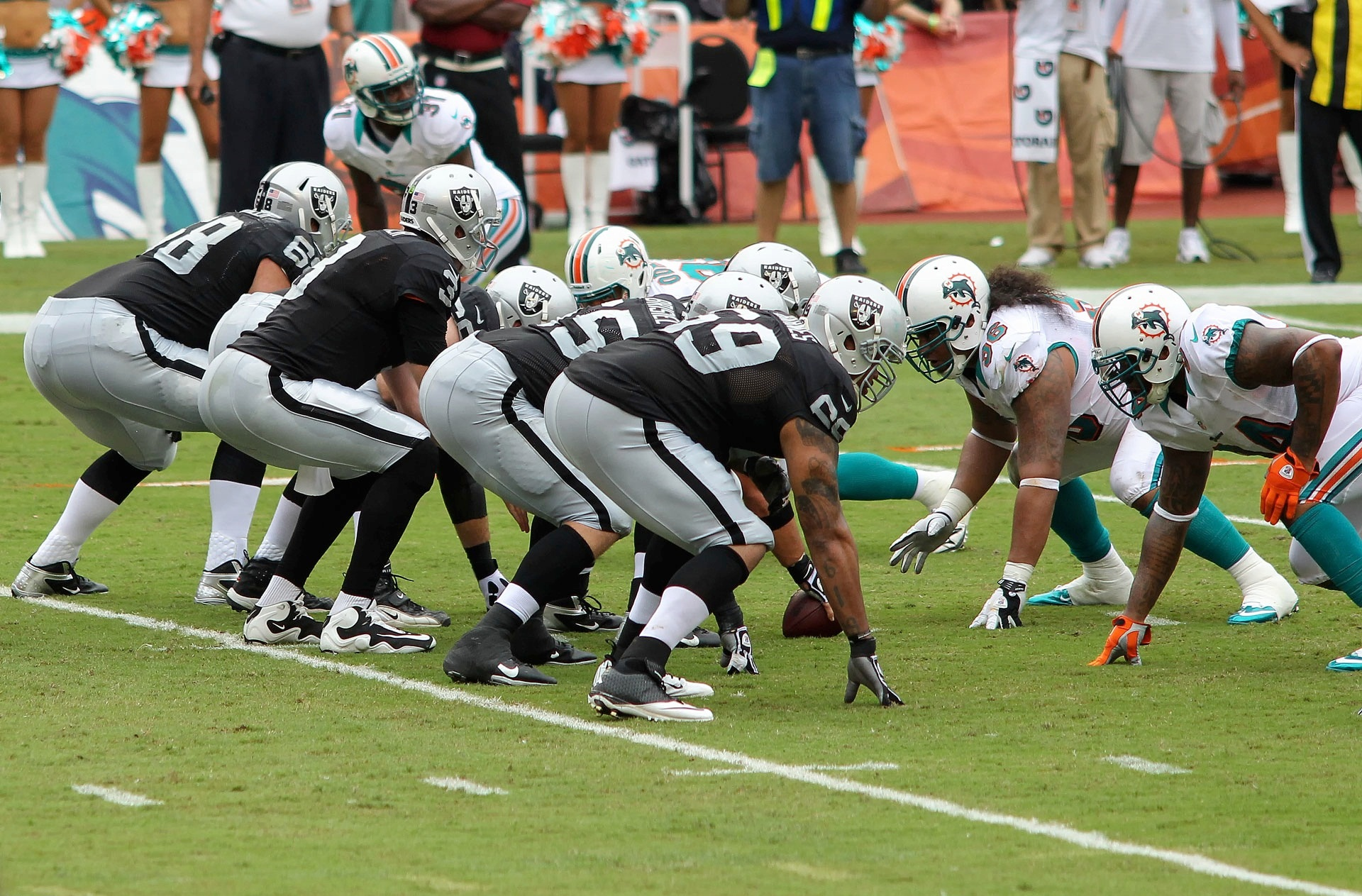
Khalif Barnes, an offensive tackle for the Oakland Raiders (No. 69 in black jersey on right) in a 2012 game against the Miami Dolphins

The positioning of the offensive tackles in a formation

A tackle (T), also called an offensive tackle (OT) and subcategorized as a left tackle or right tackle, is an American football position that flanks the two guards on the offensive line. Like other offensive linemen, their objective is to block during each offensive play, physically preventing defenders from tackling or disrupting the offensive ball carrier with the intention of advancing the football downfield. A tackle is considered the most important position on the offensive line, primarily in charge of perimeter protection against defensive ends and edge rushers.

Left tackles have historically been more desired, but the distinction between right and left have become less relevant over time. In the NFL, offensive tackles often measure over 6 ft 4 in (193 cm) and weigh over 300 lb (140 kg). According to Sports Illustrated football journalist Paul Zimmerman, offensive tackles consistently achieve the highest cognitive ability scores relative to the other positional groups. The Wonderlic is taken before the draft to assess each player's aptitude for learning and problem solving.

== History ==
Historically, in the one-platoon system of football, "tackle" referred to a two-way player that played both offense and defense. In the two-platoon system, players began playing only offense or defense, hence offensive tackle and defensive tackle.

Notable tackles from the sport's early days include Fats Henry, Josh Cody, and Duke Slater.

== Left tackle ==
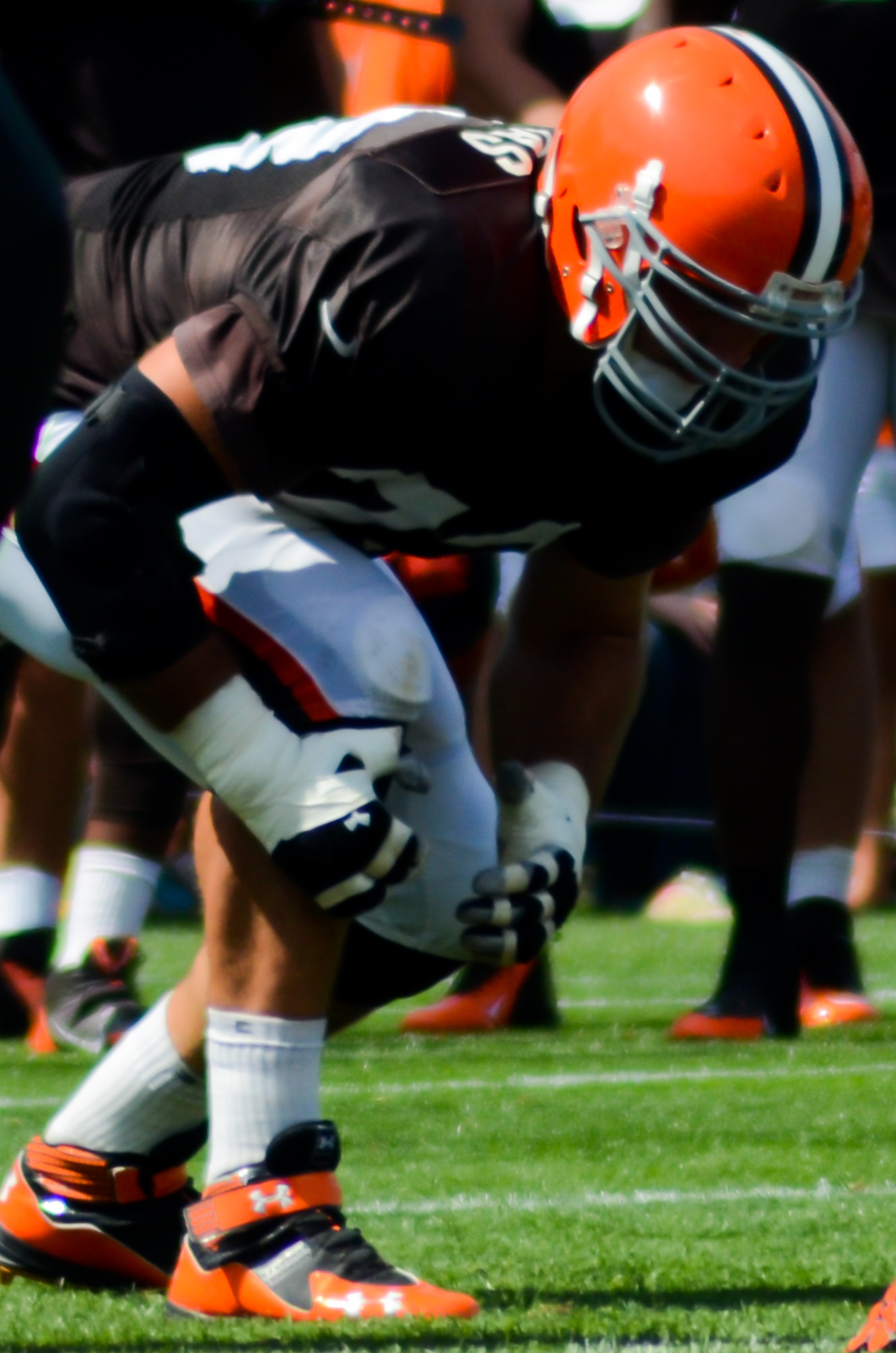
Cleveland Browns left tackle Joe Thomas lining up pre-snap

The left tackle (LT) is usually the team's best pass blocker. Of the two tackles, the left tackles will often have better footwork and agility than the right tackle in order to counteract the pass rush of defensive ends. When a quarterback throws a forward pass, the quarterback's shoulders are aligned roughly perpendicular to the line of scrimmage, with the non-dominant shoulder closer to downfield. The vast majority of quarterbacks are right-handed, so they turn their backs to defenders coming from the left side, creating a vulnerable "blind side" that the left tackle must protect. (Conversely, teams with left-handed quarterbacks tend to have their better pass blockers at right tackle for the same reason.)

A 2006 book by Michael Lewis, The Blind Side: Evolution of a Game, made into a 2009 motion picture, shed light on the workings of the left tackle position. The book and the film's introduction discuss how the annual salary of left tackles in the NFL skyrocketed in the mid-1990s. Premier left tackles are now highly sought after and are often the second highest paid players on a roster after the quarterback; in the 2013 NFL draft three of the first four picks were left tackles, and usually at least one left tackle is picked in the first five positions. Recent examples include Will Campbell (2025, 4th overall pick), Joe Alt (2024, 5th overall pick), Andrew Thomas (2020, 4th overall pick), Brandon Scherff (2015, 5th overall pick), Eric Fisher (2013, 1st overall pick), Luke Joeckel (2013, 2nd overall pick), Lane Johnson (2013, 4th overall pick), Matt Kalil (2012, 4th overall pick), Trent Williams (2010, 4th overall pick), and Jake Long (2008, 1st overall pick).

== Right tackle ==
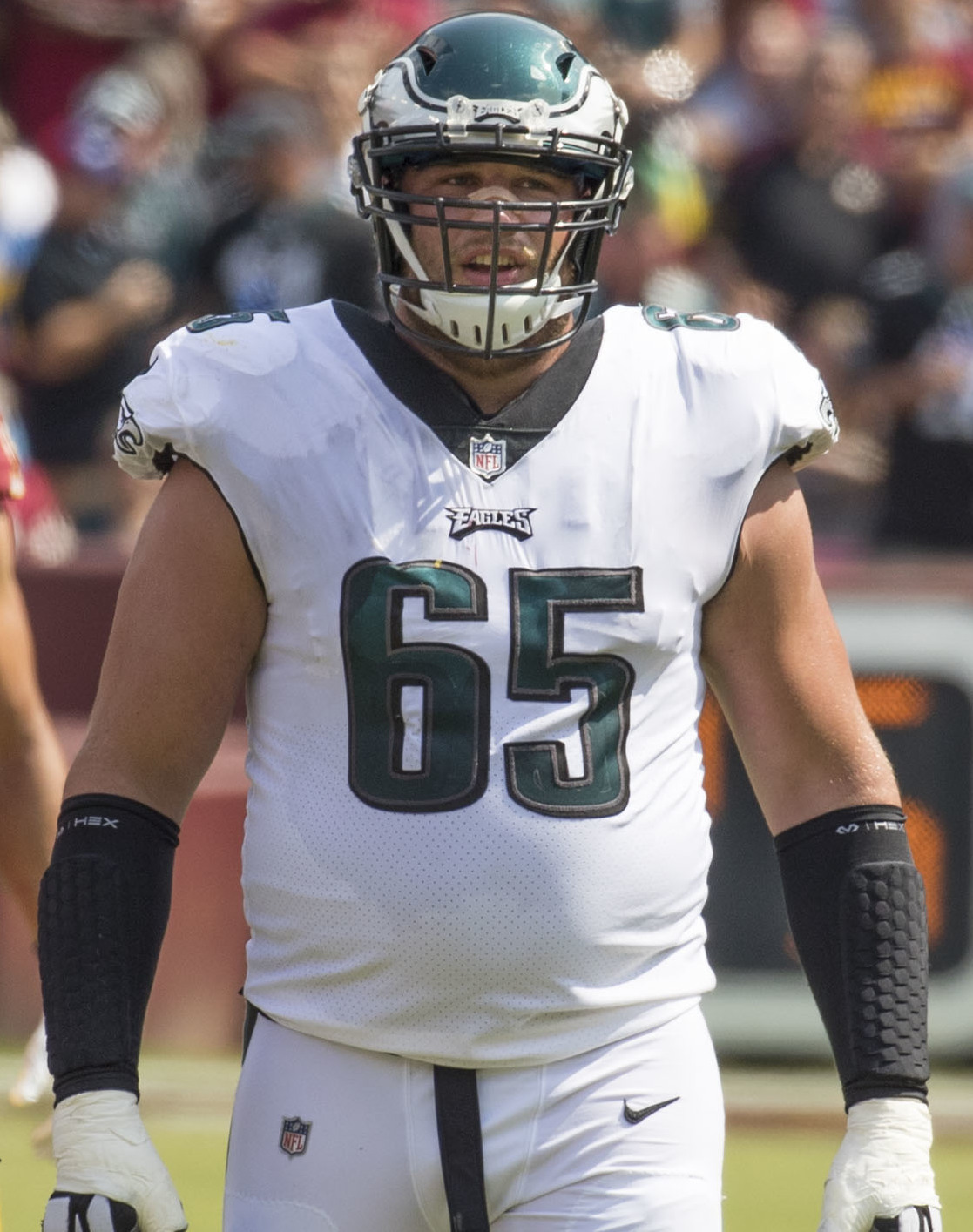
Philadelphia Eagles right tackle Lane Johnson

The right tackle (RT) is typically one of the team's most effective run blockers. Since most running plays are directed towards the strong side (the side with the tight end) of the offensive line, the right tackle often contends with the defending team's best run stoppers. They must be capable of gaining traction in their blocks to impede defenders from tackling the ball carrier or create a hole—an area between offensive linemen that forms immediately after the ball is snapped. This is a result of blocking strategies and techniques, generating enough space for the ball carrier to run between and advance the ball.

== Swing tackle ==
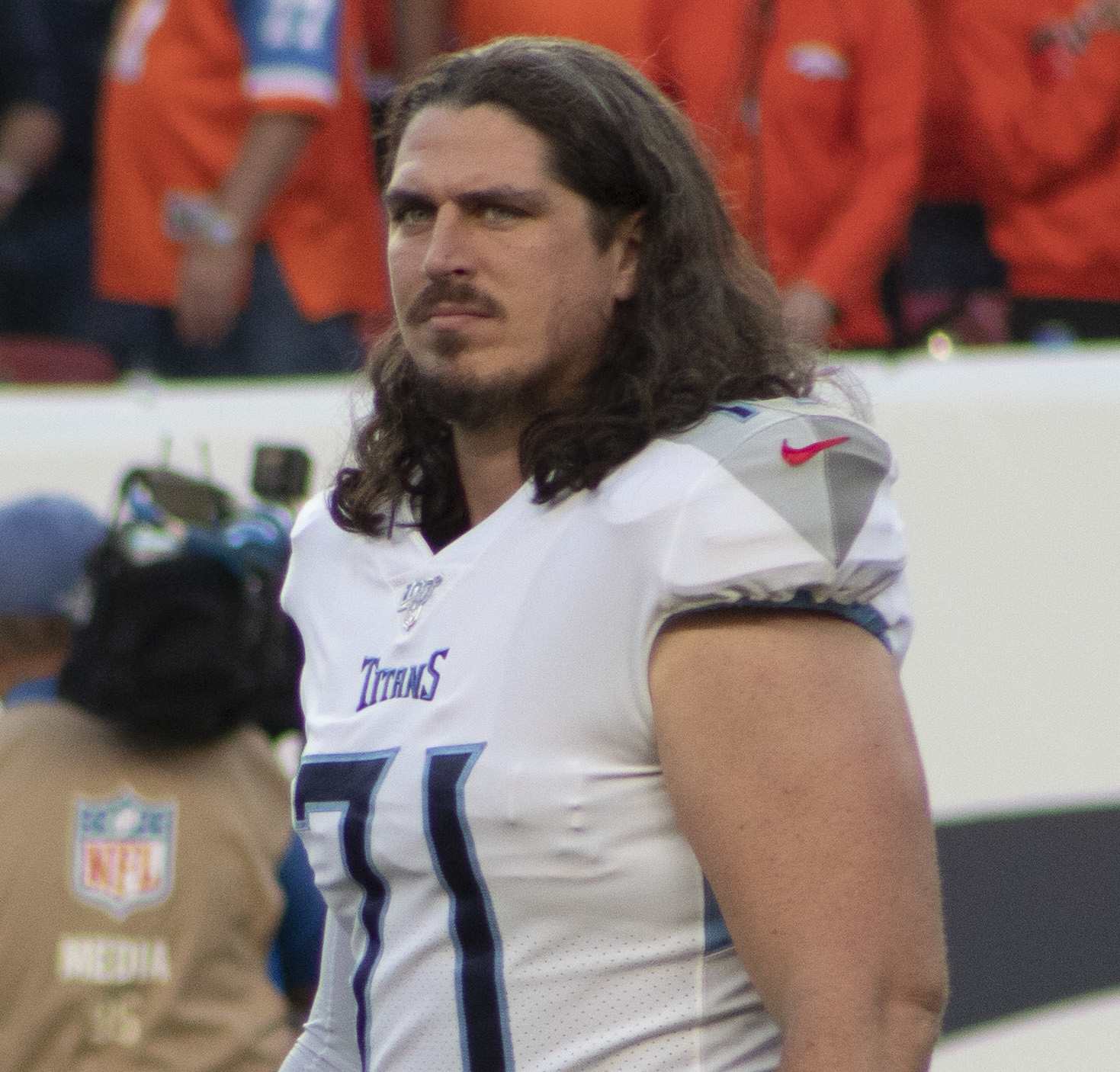
Swing tackle Dennis Kelly

A swing tackle is a backup offensive tackle who can play both right and left tackle. Most often, this role is performed by the second-string left tackle as it is more common for a left tackle to be able to play right than vice versa. Swing tackles are also commonly used as a tight end in jumbo formations to add more mass to the offensive line.
