= Platoon system =

Method of situational substitutions in sports

A platoon system in baseball or American football is a method for substituting players in groups (platoons), to keep complementary players together during playing time.

In baseball, it is usually used to optimize batting performance against pitchers of opposite handedness. Right-handed batters generally perform better against left-handed pitchers and vice versa. Despite some resistance from players who prefer consistent play time, this strategy has been effectively used by managers like Casey Stengel of the New York Yankees to win multiple World Series championships.

In American football, the term "two-platoon system" refers to the practice of using different players on offense, defense, and special teams. Additionally, "platooning quarterbacks" is a tactic where two quarterbacks with different skill sets are used alternately to maximize offensive potential and variability. This requires the defensive team to prepare for two types of quarterbacks, but it's less common in higher echelons of football due to the potential for "quarterback controversies".

== Baseball ==
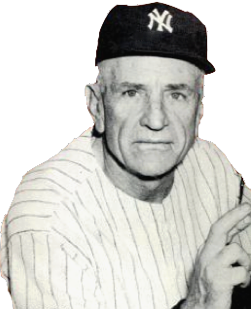
Casey Stengel popularized the platoon system as manager of the New York Yankees.

In baseball, a platoon is a method of sharing playing time, where two players are selected to play a single defensive position. Usually, one platoon player is right-handed and the other is left-handed. Typically the right-handed half of the platoon is played on days when the opposing starting pitcher is left-handed and the left-handed player is played otherwise. The theory behind this is that generally players hit better against their opposite-handed counterparts, and that in some cases the difference is extreme enough to warrant complementing the player with one of opposite handedness.

=== Strategy ===
Right-handed batters have an advantage against left-handed pitchers and left-handed batters benefit from facing right-handed pitchers. This is because a right-handed pitcher's curveball breaks to the left, from his own point of view, which causes it to cross the plate with its lateral movement away from a right-handed batter but towards a left-handed batter (and vice versa for a left-handed pitcher), and because batters generally find it easier to hit a ball that is over the plate. Furthermore, since most pitchers are right-handed, left-handed batters generally have less experience with left-handed pitchers. A left-handed pitcher may also be brought in to face a switch-hitter who generally bats left-handed, forcing the batter to shift to his less-effective right-handed stance or to take the disadvantages of batting left-handed against a left-handed pitcher.

Platooning can be viewed negatively. Players prefer to play every day, and managers, including Walter Alston, feared that sharing playing time could decrease confidence. Mookie Wilson of the New York Mets requested a trade in 1988 after serving in a platoon for three seasons with Lenny Dykstra.

=== History ===
The advantage to alternating hitters based on handedness was known from the early days of baseball. Bob Ferguson, in 1871, became baseball's first switch hitter, allowing him to bat left-handed against right-handed pitchers, and right-handed against left-handed pitchers. The first recorded platoon took place in 1887, when the Indianapolis Hoosiers briefly paired the right-handed Gid Gardner and left-handed Tom Brown in center field. In 1906, the Detroit Tigers alternated Boss Schmidt, Jack Warner, and Freddie Payne at catcher for the entire season. As manager of the Boston Braves, George Stallings employed platoons during the 1914 season, which helped the "Miracle" Braves win the 1914 World Series. No Braves outfielder reached 400 at-bats during the 1914 season. In 1934 and 1935, Detroit Tigers' manager Mickey Cochrane routinely platooned Gee Walker, a right-handed batter, to spell center fielder Jo-Jo White, a left-handed batter. Cochrane, a left-handed batter, also platooned himself behind the plate with Ray Hayworth, a right-handed batter. Also in the 1930s, Bill Terry of the New York Giants platooned center fielders Hank Leiber and Jimmy Ripple. The approach was seldom used in the 1930s, but Casey Stengel, managing the Braves, platooned third basemen Debs Garms and Joe Stripp in 1938. Stengel himself had been platooned as a player by managers John McGraw and Wilbert Robinson. Garms won the National League's batting title in 1940 with the Pittsburgh Pirates as a part-time player under Frankie Frisch.

Terms for this strategy included "double-batting shift, "switch-around players", and "reversible outfield". Tris Speaker referred to his strategy as the "triple shift", because he employed it at three positions. The term "platoon" was coined in the late 1940s. Stengel, now managing the New York Yankees, became a well known proponent of the platoon system, and won five consecutive World Series championships from 1949 through 1953 using the strategy. Stengel platooned Bobby Brown, Billy Johnson, and Gil McDougald at third base, Joe Collins and Moose Skowron at first base, and Hank Bauer and Gene Woodling in left field. Harold Rosenthal, writing for the New York Herald, referred to Stengel's strategy as a "platoon", after the American football concept, and it came to be known as "two-platooning".

Following Stengel's success, other teams began implementing their own platoons. In the late 1970s through early 1980s, Baltimore Orioles manager Earl Weaver successfully employed a platoon in left field, using John Lowenstein, Benny Ayala, and Gary Roenicke, using whichever player was performing the best at the time. Weaver also considered other factors, including the opposing pitcher's velocity, and his batters' ability in hitting a fastball. The Orioles continued to platoon at catcher and all three outfield positions in 1983 under Joe Altobelli, as the Orioles won the 1983 World Series, leading other teams to pursue the strategy.

"I'd rather be playing every day, but playing every day in the minor leagues is not nearly as pleasant as platooning in the big leagues."

— Brian Daubach

Platooning decreased in frequency from the late 1980s through the 1990s, as teams expanded their bullpens to nullify platoon advantages for hitters. However, the use of platoons has increased in recent years. As teams increase their analysis of data, they attempt to put batters and pitchers in situations where they are more likely to succeed. Generally, small market teams, which cannot afford to sign the league's best players to market-value contracts, are most likely to employ platoons. Under manager Bob Melvin, the Athletics have employed many platoons, with Josh Reddick calling Melvin the "king of platoons". Joe Maddon began to employ platoons as manager of the Tampa Bay Rays.

The 2013 World Series champion Boston Red Sox platooned Jonny Gomes and Daniel Nava in left field. After the 2013 season, left-handed relief pitchers Boone Logan and Javier López, both considered left-handed specialists because of their ability to limit the effectiveness of left-handed batters, signed multimillion-dollar contracts as free agents.

== American football ==
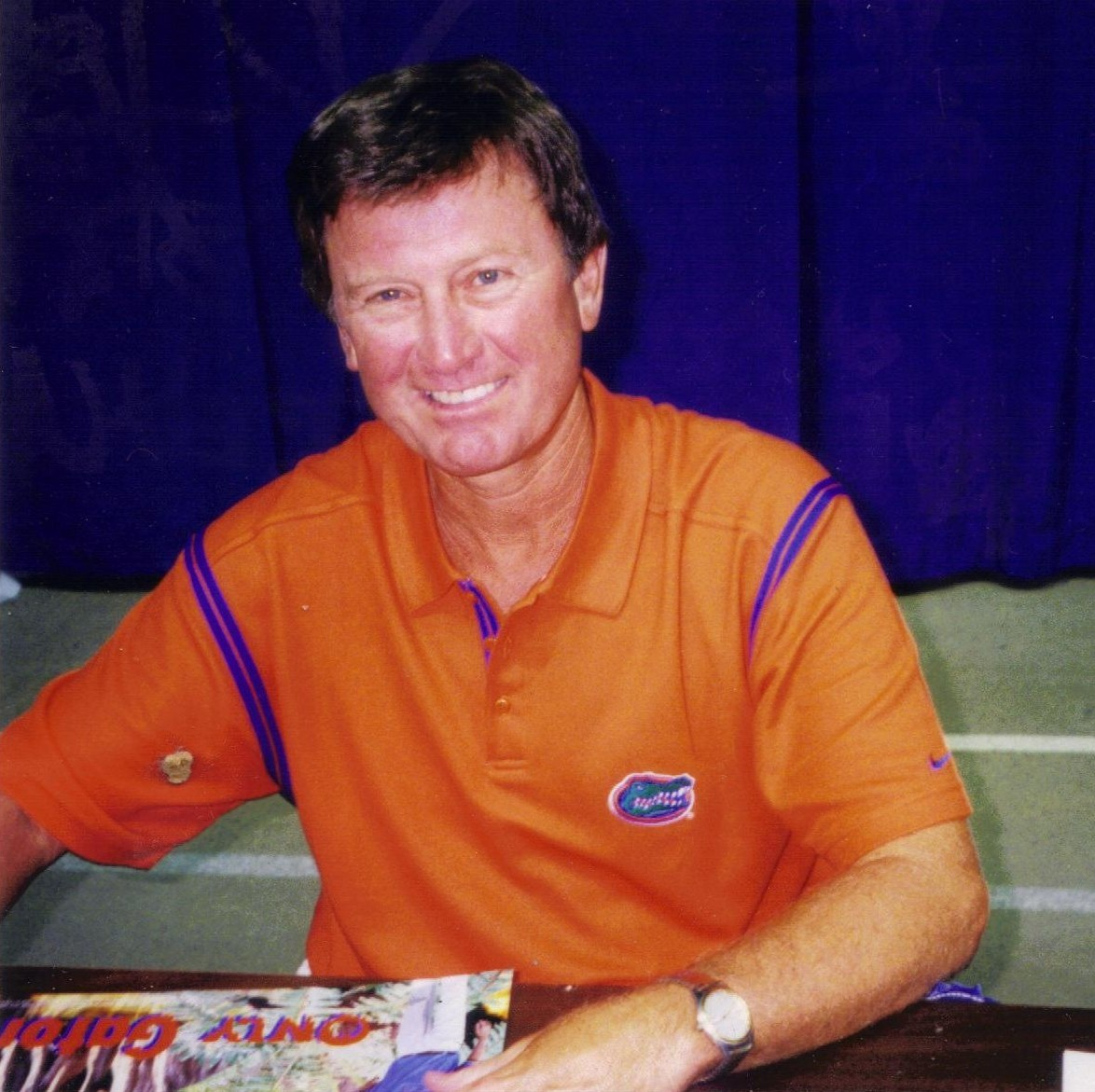
Steve Spurrier often used "platooning quarterbacks".

The term "two-platoon system", in contrast with the "one-platoon system", was once used for the practice, universal today at all levels of football, of using mostly or entirely different players on offense, defense, and special teams.

When a football team uses two or more quarterbacks to run their offense, rather than the traditional one, it is known as "platooning quarterbacks". This tactic is less common the higher the echelons of American football, as high school teams are more likely to do it than National Football League teams, for example.

Quarterbacks may be switched in and out of the game at every play, every drive, every quarter, depending on certain situations. If quarterbacks are switched on a game-to-game basis, it is not platooning, it is known as a "quarterback controversy", or a simple "benching".

Using two different quarterbacks allows an offensive team to use players with different skill sets. One common reason teams platoon quarterbacks is because one player is a good passer and the other a good runner, for example Stanley Jackson and Joe Germaine of the 1997 Ohio State Buckeyes. Defensive teams, therefore, must prepare for two types of quarterback. It also allows offenses teams to run a greater variety of plays.

== See also ==
- One-platoon system (American football)
- Two-platoon system (American football)
- Lefty-righty switch
- Resting the starters
