= Lefty-righty switch =

Baseball maneuver

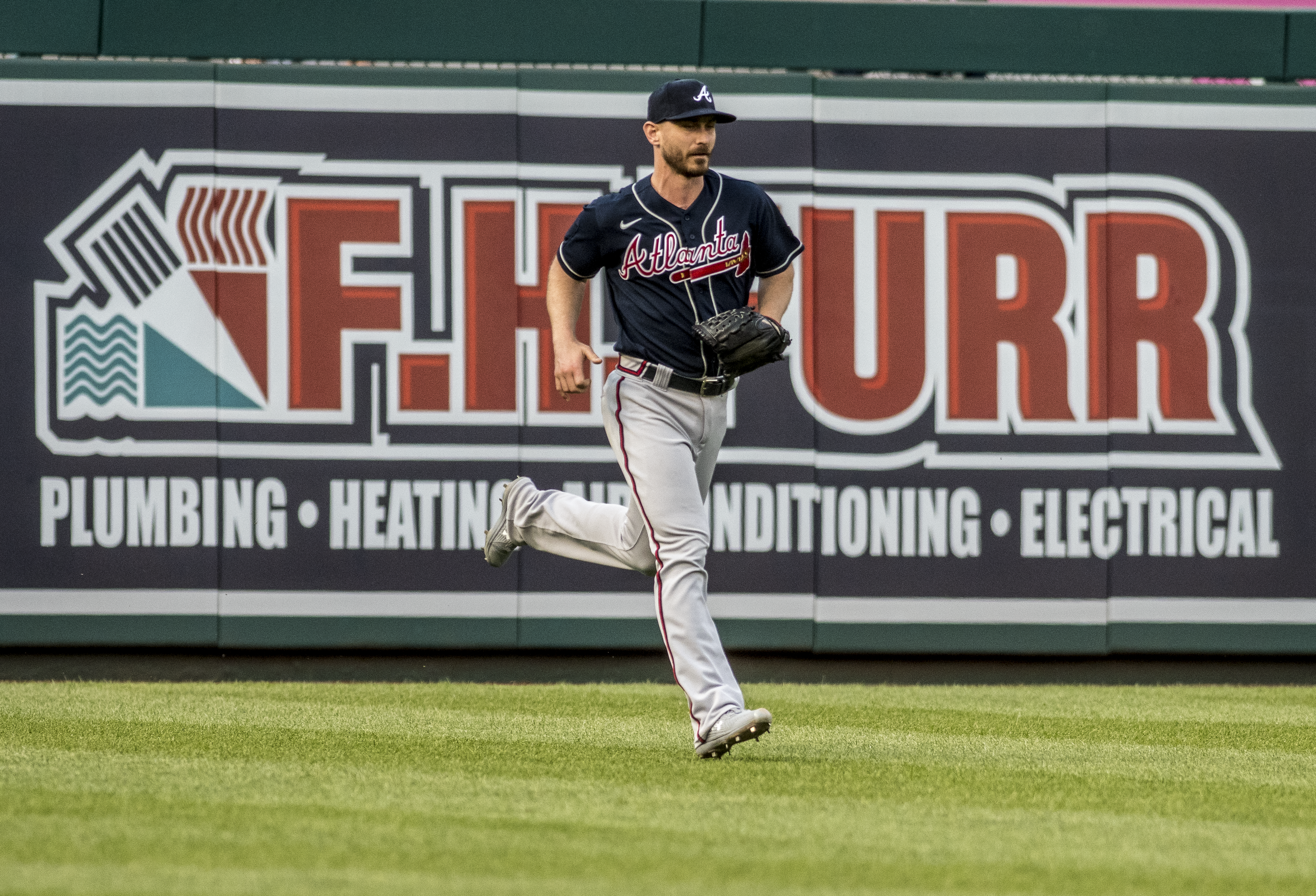
With right-handed Trea Turner due to bat, left-handed pitcher Tyler Matzek is replaced by right-handed pitcher Josh Tomlin (pictured) in a game on April 6, 2021.

In baseball, the lefty-righty switch is a maneuver by which a player who may be at a disadvantage against an opponent of a certain handedness is replaced by a substitute who is better suited for the situation.

For example, with a left-handed batter due to hit at a critical point in a game, a right-handed pitcher may be replaced by a left-handed relief pitcher, as pitchers generally fare better when pitching from the same side that a batter hits from. Similarly, with a left-handed pitcher in the game, teams may replace a left-handed batter with a right-handed pinch hitter, as batters generally fare better when hitting from the opposite side that a pitcher throws from.

== Discussion ==
Conventional baseball wisdom suggests that, when a pitcher and a batter pitch or bat with the same hand, the pitcher typically has the advantage. For example, right-handed pitchers typically have an advantage when facing right-handed batters. One factor is that breaking balls thrown by a pitcher will generally have movement away from a batter of the same handedness as the pitch crosses home plate. For this reason, switch hitters will normally bat right-handed when facing left-handed pitchers, and will bat left-handed when facing right-handed pitchers. While ambidextrous pitchers are not unknown, so-called "switch pitchers" are very rare.

Statistically in Major League Baseball (MLB), left-handed batters are less successful against left-handed pitchers than right-handed batters are against right-handed pitchers, leading to some left-handed pitchers being used strategically as left-handed specialists. As of the 2019 MLB season, approximately two-thirds of batters were right-handed, while approximately three-fourths of pitchers were right-handed. In the general population, studies suggest that approximately 10% of people are left-handed.

The follow sections discuss how the above factors influence the use of players in certain baseball positions.

=== Relief pitchers ===
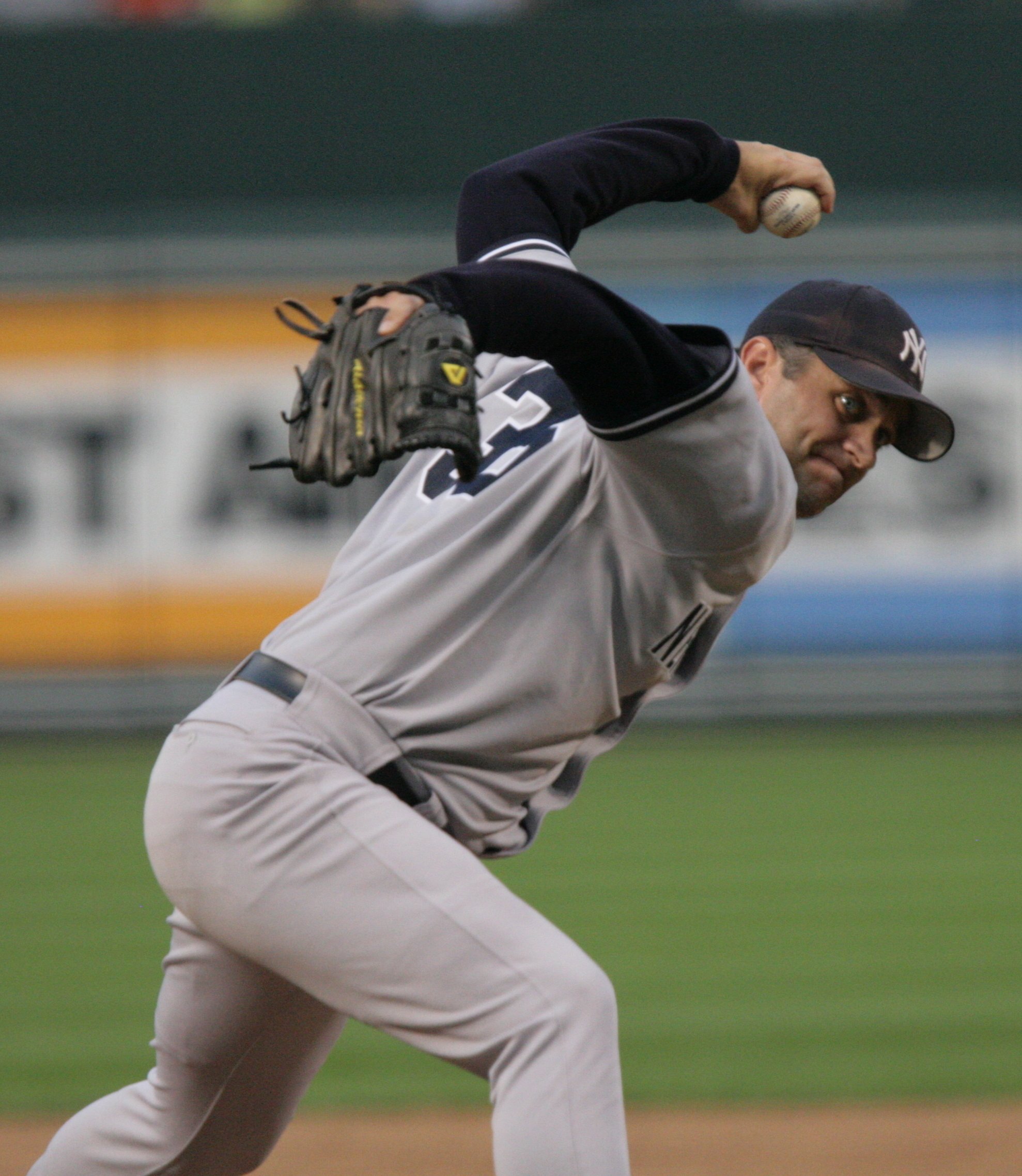
Left-handed specialist Mike Myers was often brought in to games specifically to pitch to left-handed batters.

The most common use of the lefty-righty switch is when a right-handed pitcher is facing a left-handed batter. The manager of the defensive team will sometimes bring in a relief pitcher from the bullpen, especially in close games where the starting pitcher has already been replaced, and use a left-handed specialist to face the left-handed batter. The new pitcher will then attempt to get the batter out. Whether he succeeded or failed, a left-handed specialist was often replaced after facing a single batter. This strategy has been somewhat curtailed by the introduction of the three-batter minimum rule in MLB as of the 2020 season, which requires pitchers to face at least three batters once entering a game, unless the half-inning ends or the pitcher sustains an injury.

The lefty-righty switch can also be used against switch hitters who have a noticeably lower batting average from one side, or in the somewhat rarer instance of a batter who does poorly against opposite-handed pitchers. The basic principle in these cases remains the same.

=== Batters ===
A batter may be replaced to gain a handedness advantage over a pitcher, typically at a strategically important point in a close game. For instance, with a left-handed pitcher in the game with a left-handed batter due up late in a close game, a right-handed batter may be called upon to pinch hit. The right-handed batter may not be as strong an all-round player as the batter he replaced, but he is a superior tactical choice for the purpose of getting on base in one plate appearance with a favorable matchup. Such a batter can be pinch run for if he reaches base, replaced with a better defensive player for the next half-inning, or simply left in for the remainder of the game.

=== Starting lineups ===
Starting pitchers will often face batters who hit from both sides of the plate as a matter of course. This is considered a part of their job, and the ability to retire batters from either side of the plate is an important asset for any starting pitcher. Most starters, especially those who rely on ball movement rather than power, are still stronger throwing against batters on one side of the plate, however, the difference is often less pronounced than that for pitchers in the bullpen. Late in close games, when the starter is tiring and baserunners become more important, a starter may be lifted for a specialist, but a starting pitcher is traditionally not replaced with a specialist without having first worked deep in a close game.

Similarly, position players must accept facing both left-handed and right-handed pitching as part of their job. Teams will sometimes implement a platoon system, avoiding starting batters who are very weak against one sort of pitcher, using such batters such that they only face starting pitchers who offer favorable matchups. However, it is impossible to shield a batter from every instance in which he will face a pitcher who has him at a disadvantage. As a result, a position player must be prepared at all times to face a lefty-righty switch in a situation where his team cannot pinch hit for him.

=== Managers ===
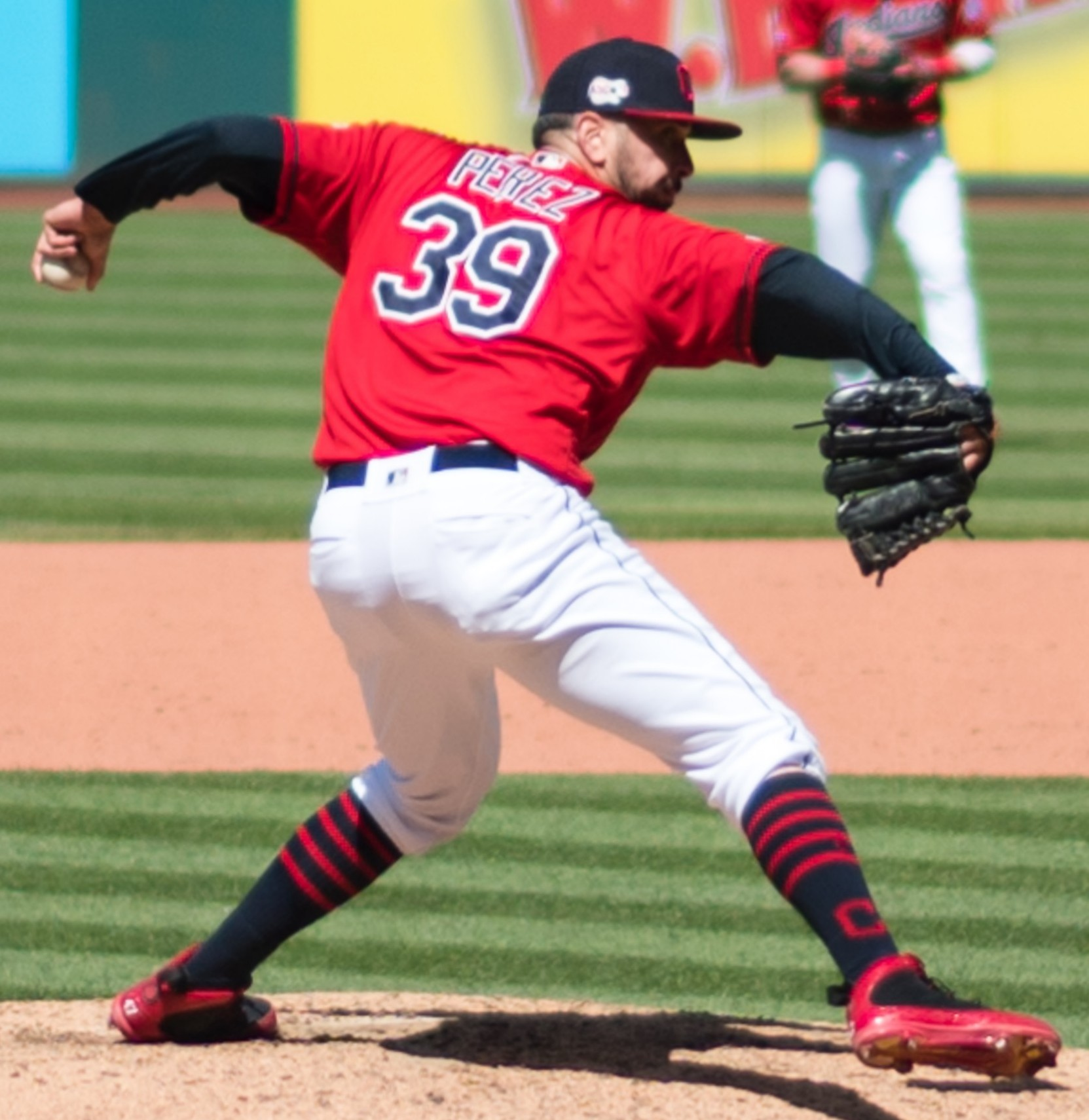
Óliver Pérez made a zero-pitch appearance in 2019 due to multiple lefty-righty switches.

Lefty-righty switches may result in competing substitutions by managers, with such maneuvers occurring in sequence. For instance, a manager may be faced with the situation of his right-handed reliever facing a strong left-handed batter late in a close game. In such a situation, the manager will often bring in his left-handed specialist. However, if the opposing manager has an adequate right-handed batter on his bench, the opposing manager may use him as a pinch hitter, thus restoring a matchup advantage to the offense. The defensive manager may now find himself in the unpleasant situation of having his left-handed specialist face a right-handed batter. The defensive manager, however, may consider this an acceptable tradeoff versus having the original left-handed batter face his right-handed pitcher.

==== Oddities ====
The above sort of tactical maneuvering has led to the statistical oddity of a pitcher "pitching" in a game without actually throwing a pitch. On June 29, 2018, the Cleveland Indians visited the Oakland Athletics. In the bottom of the seventh inning with two outs and two runners on base, the A's had a 2–0 lead with left-handed batters Dustin Fowler and Matt Joyce coming up. Indians manager Terry Francona replaced his right-handed starter Trevor Bauer with left-handed specialist Óliver Pérez. The A's countered by pinch hitting for Fowler with the right-handed Mark Canha, whom Pérez intentionally walked by holding out four fingers to the home plate umpire (a newly implemented option for the 2018 season). This loaded the bases for the right-handed Chad Pinder, who was sent in by Oakland manager Bob Melvin to pinch hit for Joyce. Francona did not want Pérez to pitch to a right-handed batter, so with the bases loaded he removed Pérez in favor of right-handed reliever Zach McAllister. Pérez was therefore credited with zero innings pitched, one batter faced, one intentional walk, and zero pitches thrown. McAllister was able to strike out Pinder, ending the inning.

In a 2008 game in Minor League Baseball, switch hitter Ralph Henriquez faced switch pitcher Pat Venditte, who wore a special glove that he could use on either hand. At the time, there was no rule restricting players from changing their handedness an unlimited number of times, and the two players began jockeying for an advantage before a pitch was thrown: Henriquez trying to get a right-left or left-right matchup by moving between the two batter's boxes, and Venditte trying to get a right-right or left-left matchup by changing which hand he had his glove on. After extended discussion between both managers and the umpires, Henriquez was asked to pick a side to bat from—he chose to bat right-handed, and Venditte then struck him out while pitching right-handed. A rule, nicknamed the Venditte rule, was subsequently adopted that requires an ambidextrous pitcher to indicate which hand he intends to pitch with, prior to a batter taking his position in one of the batter's boxes, and prohibiting the pitcher from changing hands for that plate appearance.
