= Left-handed specialist =

Pitching role in baseball

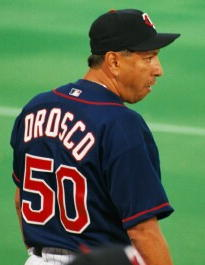
Jesse Orosco, who became a left-handed specialist later in his career, pitched until the age of 46.

In baseball, a left-handed specialist (also known as lefty specialist) is a relief pitcher who throws left-handed and specializes in pitching to left-handed batters, weak right-handed batters, and switch-hitters who bat poorly right-handed. Because baseball practices permanent substitution, these pitchers frequently pitch to a very small number of batters in any given game, and rarely pitch to strictly right-handed batters. Most Major League Baseball (MLB) teams have several left-handed pitchers on their rosters, at least one of whom is a left-handed specialist.

Prior to 2020, when the MLB rules were amended to require all pitchers to complete an inning or face at least three hitters, some left-handed specialists commonly faced only one batter before leaving the game. Such a specialist was sometimes called a LOOGY (or Lefty One-Out GuY), coined by John Sickels, sometimes used pejoratively.

== Pitching style ==
The pitcher generally has an advantage when his handedness is the same as the batter's, and the batter has an advantage when they are opposite. This is because a right-handed pitcher's breaking balls move to the left from the pitcher's perspective, which causes it to cross the plate with its lateral movement away from a right-handed batter but towards a left-handed batter (and vice versa for a left-handed pitcher), and because batters generally find it easier to hit a ball that is over the plate. Furthermore, since most pitchers are right-handed, left-handed batters generally have less experience with left-handed pitchers. A left-handed pitcher may also be brought in to face a switch-hitter who generally bats left-handed, forcing the batter to shift to his less-effective right-handed stance or to take the disadvantages of batting left-handed against a left-handed pitcher. Research from 2011 to 2013 has shown that a pinch hitter (usually right-handed) is often used when a left-handed reliever is inserted in the game, thereby reducing or negating the pitcher's platoon split advantage. Only a handful of left-handed relievers face a higher percentage of left-handed batters than right-handed batters over the course of a season.

== History ==
In the 1991 MLB season, there were 28 left-handed relievers who were not their team's closer and pitched 45 or more games. Only four averaged fewer than an inning per appearance. From 2001 to 2004, over 75 percent of left handed relievers meeting those criteria averaged less than one inning. Left-handed reliever John Candelaria was one of the early specialists in 1991, pitching 59 games and averaged .571 innings. In 1992, he allowed no earned runs—excluding inherited runners—in 43 of the 50 games. Jesse Orosco became a left-handed specialist later in his 24-season career and retired at the age of 46. From 1991 to 2003, he never averaged more than an inning pitched per appearance.

During the 2013 MLB season, there were seven relief pitchers who averaged less than two outs recorded per appearance, all of whom were left-handed. Joe Thatcher, a left-handed specialist, appeared in 72 games with 39 2/3 innings pitched, and had the fewest outs recorded per appearance, with 1.6.

Mike Myers is considered one of the most successful LOOGY pitchers of all time, having made 883 appearances for nine different teams over the span of a 13 year career, 1995–2007. During that time, he threw 541 2/3 innings. Recognizing the limited skill and playing time of pitchers in the role, Myers has said "We were like the field goal kicker, but only when the kicker was called in when the game was on the line. It was their best against you, every time, and you couldn't mess up."

German-born Will Ohman discovered his talent by accident while playing catch as a walk-on player for Pepperdine University when he tried a different slider grip and noticed an extreme break on the ball. He went on to pitch in 483 major league games over 10 seasons between 2000 and 2012. Explaining the precarious nature of the position, Ohman said, "I was the last guy on the roster in every clubhouse I was in. You do your job and other people get the glory."

=== Three-batter minimum ===
Since the start of the 2020 MLB season, all pitchers, whether starters or relievers, have been required to face at least three batters, or pitch to the end of the half-inning in which they enter the game. Exceptions are allowed only for incapacitating injury or illness while pitching. Journalist Anthony Castrovince of MLB.com opined that the new rule would "effectively end the so-called "LOOGY" (left-handed one-out guy) and other specialist roles in which pitchers are brought in for one very specific matchup."

== Right-handed specialist ==
The right-handed specialist (sometimes called a ROOGY, for Righty One-Out GuY) is the less common vice versa contrast to the left-handed specialist, due to there being a higher percentage of right-handed batters and pitchers in Major League Baseball, but they are occasionally featured.

== See also ==
- Lefty-righty switch
