= Two-platoon system =

American football tactic

The two-platoon system is a tactic in American football enabled by rules allowing unlimited substitution adopted during the 1940s. The "two platoons", offense and defense, are an integral part of the game today.

Although professional football has uninterruptedly retained the two-platoon system since 1949, in 1953 the NCAA took the collegiate game back to the one-platoon system with new limited substitution rules, changes made ostensibly for financial and competitive reasons. These rules remained in place until a return to unlimited substitution was made for the 1965 season.

== History ==
=== The original one-platoon game ===
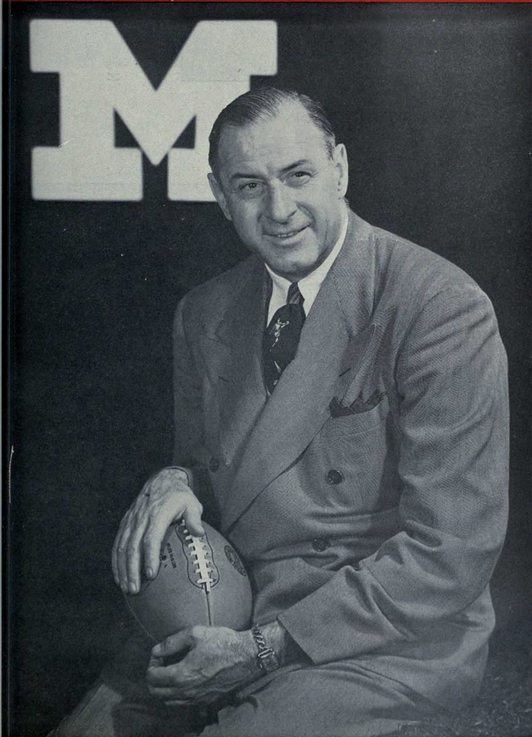
Fritz Crisler was known as the "father of two-platoon football".

In its earliest iteration, American football — like the sport of rugby whence it sprung — featured all players switching between offense and defense as required, in continuous action without leaving the field. This one-platoon system was mandated by rule. Prior to 1932, a player removed during the first half could not return to the field until the second half, while a player removed in the second half was lost for the game.

With no limits to the size of a college football roster, a severe competitive advantage was thereby created for large collegiate football programs, which could send in multiple waves of talented players; smaller schools typically experienced a severe talent drop-off between starters and reserves.

This provided the impetus for reform of the substitution rule effective with the 1933 season. Henceforth, players could be removed from the game for rest and recuperation and return to action once per quarter. This allowed talented starters to spend more time on the field, enabling small programs to remain more competitive with their larger peers.

=== Birth of two-platoon football ===
A lack of players during World War II, during which many able-bodied college-age men volunteered for or were drafted into military service, provided the rationale for a further loosening of substitution rules. A rule allowing unlimited substitution was initiated, with players now permitted to rest and return as many times as they wished per quarter. The limited pool of talented players was thus better conserved. This rules change had the corollary effect of opening the game to offensive and defensive specialization — the so-called "two-platoon" system.

The first known use of the "two-platoon" system was by Michigan head coach Fritz Crisler in 1945 against an Army team under head coach "Colonel" Earl "Red" Blaik. Michigan lost the game, 28–7, but Crisler's use of eight players who played only on offense, eight who played only on defense, and three that played both, impressed Blaik enough for him to adopt it for his own team.

Blaik, a former soldier himself, coined the "platoon" terminology in reference to the type of military unit. Between 1946 and 1950, Blaik's two-platoon teams twice finished the season ranked second in the Associated Press polls and never finished lower than 11th. By 1949, the "Army two-platoon system" had gained wide use among those college teams with ample manpower resources. Rules at that time permitted unlimited substitution whenever the ball changed hands or when the clock was stopped, but allowed only limited substitution with a running clock.

=== NCAA's return to the one-platoon system ===
There was very little advance warning that a major reversion to previous substitution rules was in the offing in college football in 1953. Ahead of the annual convention of the NCAA Football Rules Committee, held each January, the rules committee of the American Football Coaches Association voted 6 to 1 to recommend continuation of liberal substitution rules, voting 4 to 1 in favor of completely unlimited substitution. But behind the scenes, smaller schools, hit by the dramatically increased costs necessary to field larger two-platoon teams, applied pressure for a return to earlier rules which greatly restricted substitution—effectively forcing players to play both offense and defense.

The change would be sudden. The January 1953 convention of the NCAA's rules committee, acting at the behest of a resolution drafted by the NCAA Council to the gathering, voted to eliminate free substitution and thus the two-platoon system from the college game, effective with the forthcoming 1953 season. Driving the return to "iron man" football was the high cost of fielding large two-platoon squads — an expense which had forced 50 small schools to terminate their football programs for financial reasons.

Fritz Crisler, regarded as a father of the two-platoon scheme, was ironically in charge of this return to the college game's former limited substitution rules, chairing the rules committee meeting in his new capacity of athletic director of the University of Michigan. Crisler declared: "We were gravely concerned about those schools who have had to abandon football. In the end, after three days of serious, unselfish discussion, we decided it was necessary in the interest of football's future to bring an end to the two-platoon system."

The new 1953 rules revisions specified that a player removed during the first or third quarter could not return to the field until the subsequent quarter. Those removed prior to the last four minutes of the second or fourth quarter could not return until the final four minutes of that same quarter. In addition, only one player could be substituted between plays, effectively putting an end the mass switching of offensive and defensive units.

Coaches were deeply divided over the return to the "iron man" game. Alabama head coach Red Drew charged that the 1953 revisions returned college football "to the horse and buggy days."

On the other hand, coaches of smaller schools indicated that the rule changes would make their institutions the beneficiaries. Assistant coach Gene Menges of San Jose State University said, "It definitely will help us. Against larger squads the manpower edge certainly won't mean as much to us as before." Coach Chuck Taylor of Stanford concurred, declaring, "I have felt the unlimited substitution rule hurt small schools such as ours. I think the education and moral values of the game, which, after all, remain the basic reason for its being played at all, will be enhanced."

The 1953 NCAA football season was retrospectively referred to by Detroit Free Press sportswriter Tommy Devine as "The Year of the Great Adjustment," in which teams scrambled to tighten their rosters and adapt their offensive and defensive strategies as they "made the switch from free-wheeling unlimited substitution into the tighter, more conservative pattern of single platoon play."

=== Unlimited substitution returns to college football ===
After the 1964 season, twelve years since the mandate requiring one-platoon, the NCAA repealed the rules enforcing its use and allowed an unlimited amount of player substitutions. This allowed, starting with the 1965 season, teams to form separate offensive and defensive units as well as "special teams" which would be employed in kicking situations.

The reinstatement of the two-platoon system allowed players to become more specialized by focusing on a limited number of plays and skills related to their specific position. With players now fresher, coaches could now build their teams for speed and agility rather than brute strength and endurance; Don Coryell took advantage of the quarterbacks and wide receivers that were overlooked in the days of one-platoon ball to create one of the first predominantly passing offenses in top-level football. This, in turn, prompted defenses to respond in kind with wider-open defenses that emphasized linebackers and defensive backs, which in turn led to the rise of modern defenses such as the 4–3 defense and 3–4 defense and led to earlier defenses with more defensive linemen becoming obsolete.

By the early 1970s, however, some university administrators, coaches and others were calling for a return to the days of one-platoon football, to save money spent by athletic departments on scholarships, stipends, travel, and lodging.

== See also ==
- One-platoon system
- Platoon system
- Substitution (sport)
