= Switch hitter =

Baseball player who can hit both left- and right-handed

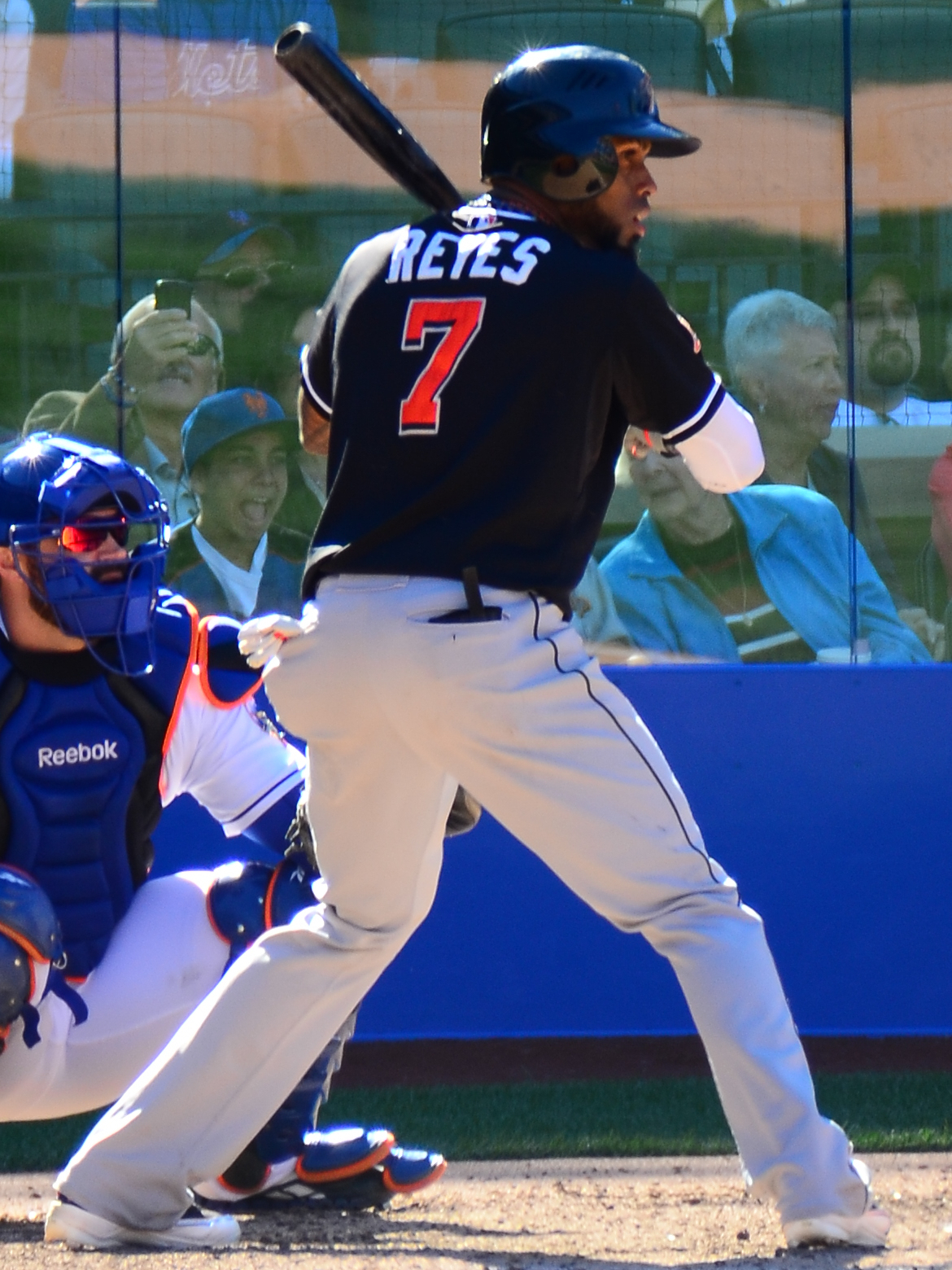
José Reyes, a switch hitter, batting left-handed in 2012

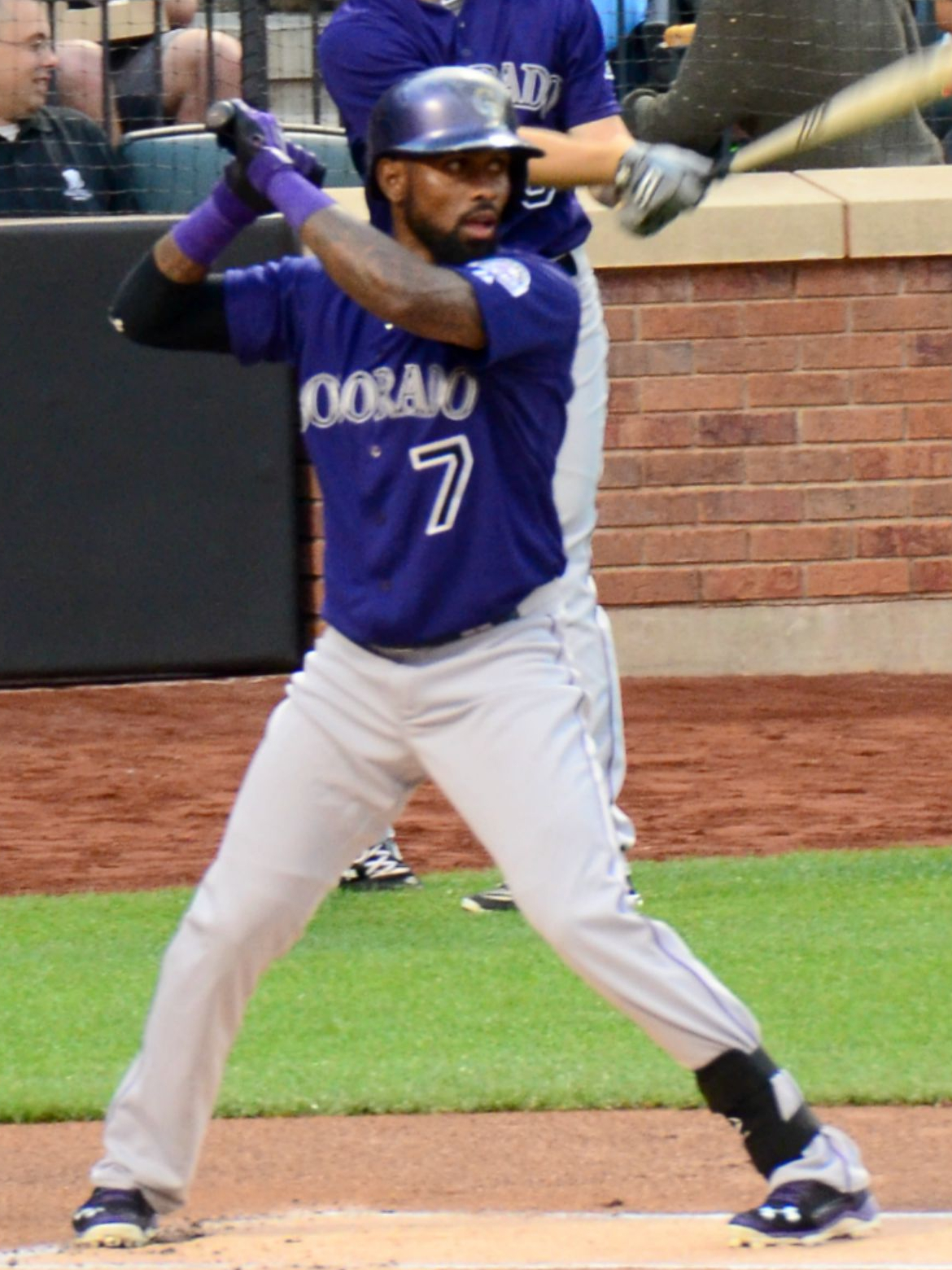
Reyes batting right-handed in 2015

In baseball, a switch hitter is a player who bats both right-handed and left-handed, usually right-handed against left-handed pitchers and left-handed against right-handed pitchers.

== Characteristics ==
Right-handed batters generally hit better against left-handed pitchers and vice versa. Most curveballs break away from batters hitting from the same side as the opposing pitcher, making them harder to hit with the barrel (or "sweet spot") of the bat. Additionally, the pitcher's release is farther from the batter's center of vision. In the words of Pat Venditte, one of the few ambidextrous pitchers in major league history, "If I'm pitching right-handed and they're hitting right-handed, it's tougher for them to see. And then, your breaking pitches are going away from their barrel rather than into their barrel." Even so, many switch-hitters perform better from one side of the plate than the other.

Numerous switch-hitters have achieved a higher batting average on one side of the plate, but hit with more power from the other. For instance, New York Yankees great Mickey Mantle always considered himself a better right-handed hitter, but hit home runs at a higher rate from the left side of the plate. However, many of Mantle's left-handed home runs were struck at Yankee Stadium, a park notorious for being very friendly to left-handed power hitters due to its short right field porch, and Mantle batted left-handed much more often than right-handed, simply because there have always been more right-handed than left-handed pitchers. Mantle's longest home run, a 565-foot clout in 1953 at Washington's Griffith Stadium, came batting right-handed.

Most switch-hitters have been right-handed throwers, but there have been several notable switch-hitters who threw left-handed, including Cool Papa Bell, Lance Berkman, Dave Collins, Ron Roenicke, Doug Dascenzo, Mitch Webster, Wes Parker, Melky Cabrera, Nick Swisher, Justin Smoak, Michael Toglia, Jake Mangum, David Segui, Dylan Carlson, Daniel Nava, and J. T. Snow (who, in the final years of his career, hit exclusively left-handed).

== History ==
The first switch-hitter in baseball history was Bob Ferguson. His switch-hitting was different to that of today's baseball game, as he switched sides simply based on his feeling at a particular moment or certain situational reasons (such as an elite fielder on one side of the diamond). Ferguson took a notable at-bat in 1870, where he walked off the game while batting from the left side, when he had typically batted right-handed.

The number of switch hitters in MLB peaked in 1987 and has declined since, according to Baseball Reference data. In 2018, there were 48 switch hitters on MLB rosters. Five of the league's 30 teams did not have a switch hitter on their roster that season. By 2024, there were 58 switch hitters and less than half of them were American-born players.

== Switch-hitting pitchers ==
While pitchers batting has become increasingly rare with the adoption of the designated hitter by the American League in 1973 and by the National League in 2022, there have been some major league pitchers who could bat from either side of the plate. These include: Mordecai Brown, Norm Charlton, Marvin Rotblatt, Sid Monge, Johnny Vander Meer, J.C. Romero, Kyle Snyder, Wandy Rodriguez, Troy Patton, Tim Dillard, Tyler Johnson, Carlos Zambrano, Dock Ellis, Vida Blue, Anthony Claggett, Kris Medlen, Justin De Fratus, Drew Storen, Kenley Jansen, Derek Holland, Turk Wendell, Pat Neshek, Adam Ottavino, Dylan Bundy, and Lance Lynn.

Joaquín Andújar sometimes hit right-handed against lefties, sometimes left-handed. Tomo Ohka batted left-handed against right-handed pitchers in three games in 2006, but otherwise batted exclusively right-handed. Left-handed reliever Steve Kline was primarily a switch hitter but batted right-handed against right-handed pitchers several times throughout his career. Management also had a say in the switch-hitting careers of Bob Gibson and Dwight Gooden. Both Gibson and Gooden (each right handed and capable batters) reached the majors as a switch hitter, but their teams required them to bat only right handed to reduce the possibility of their pitching arms being hit by a pitch.

Switch-hitting pitchers should not be confused with a switch pitcher, a player who can pitch both right-handed and left-handed, which is very uncommon.

== Notable switch hitters ==
=== Members of the Baseball Hall of Fame ===
- Roberto Alomar
- Dave Bancroft
- Cool Papa Bell
- Carlos Beltrán
- Mordecai Brown
- Ray Brown
- Max Carey
- Roger Connor
- George Davis
- Red Faber
- Bill Foster
- Frankie Frisch
- Chipper Jones
- Ted Lyons
- Biz Mackey
- Mickey Mantle
- Rube Marquard
- Eddie Murray
- Kid Nichols
- Herb Pennock
- Tim Raines
- Robin Roberts
- Red Schoendienst
- Ted Simmons
- Ozzie Smith
- Early Wynn

=== League leaders and multi-time All-Stars ===
- Joaquín Andújar – Four-time All-Star
- Lance Berkman – Six-time All-Star
- Vida Blue – Six-time All-Star, 1971 AL MVP
- Bobby Bonilla – Six-time All-Star
- Ripper Collins – Three-time All-Star
- Chili Davis – Three-time All-Star
- Kenley Jansen – Four-time All-Star
- Howard Johnson - Two-time All Star and Silver Slugger, three 30-30 seasons
- Francisco Lindor – Five-time All-Star, two 30–30 seasons
- Lance Lynn – Two-time All-Star
- Víctor Martínez – Five-time All-Star
- Willie McGee – Four-time All-Star, 1985 NL MVP
- Bill Mueller – 2003 batting title, only player in MLB history to hit a grand slam from each side of the plate in the same game.
- Pat Neshek – Two-time All-Star
- Jorge Posada – Five-time All-Star, five-time Silver Slugger
- José Ramírez – Seven-time All-Star, three 30–30 seasons
- Cal Raleigh – Broke the single-season home run record for catchers and switch-hitters in 2025.
- José Reyes – Four-time All-Star, four-time NL stolen base leader
- Jimmy Rollins – Phillies all-time career leader in hits and doubles, 2007 NL MVP and Silver Slugger, three-time All-Star and four-time Gold Glover.
- Pete Rose – Career hits leader in MLB, 17-time All-Star, 1973 NL MVP
- Carlos Santana – Gold Glove, Silver Slugger
- Rubén Sierra – Four-time All-Star
- Ken Singleton – Three-time All-Star
- Reggie Smith – Seven-time All-Star
- Mark Teixeira – 2009 home run and RBI leader, three-time All-Star
- Garry Templeton – Three-time All-Star
- Johnny Vander Meer – Four-time All-Star, threw two-straight no-hitters
- Jason Varitek – Three-time All-Star, became the first player in MLB history to catch four no-hitters (later tied by Carlos Ruiz in 2015)
- Roy White – Two-time All-Star
- Bernie Williams – Five-time All-Star, 1998 AL batting title
- Maury Wills – Five-time All-Star, 1962 NL MVP
- Willie Wilson – Two-time All-Star, 1982 AL batting title
- Carlos Zambrano – Three-time All-Star, three-time Silver Slugger, NL wins leader in 2008
- Ben Zobrist – Three-time All-Star

== See also ==
- Ambidexterity
- Left-handed specialist
- Lefty-righty switch
- Switch hit, a cricket shot
