= One-platoon system =

Platoon system in American football

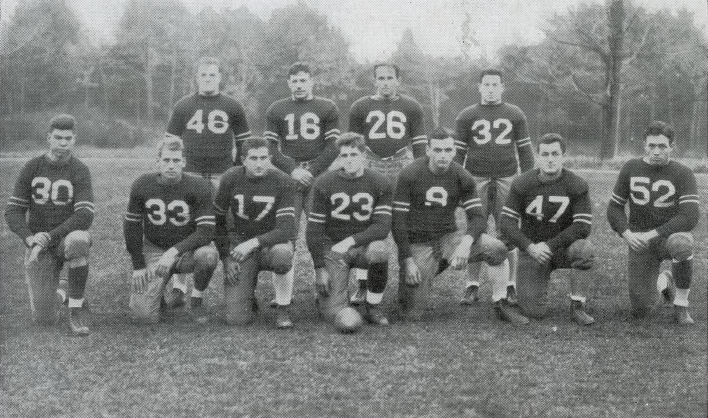
Members of the 1935 New Hampshire Wildcats football team, whose positions were listed in their college yearbook simply as backs (four, standing) and linemen (seven, kneeling).

The one-platoon system, also known as "iron man football", is a rule-driven substitution pattern in American football whereby the same players are expected to stay on the field for the entire game, playing both offense and defense as required. Players removed for a substitute are lost to their teams for the duration of the half or quarter, depending on the rule variant in use.

Existing alternatively is the two-platoon system (or simply the "platoon system"), which makes use of separate offensive and defensive units. In the contemporary game, third platoons of special teams players for kicking situations are also used.

Each system has been used at different times in American college football and in the National Football League. In the college game, the major rules switch allowing two platoons came ahead of the 1941 season – a change first emulated by the NFL in 1943.

Due to budgetary pressures associated with expanded scholarship and travel costs, member schools of the National Collegiate Athletic Association (NCAA) returned to the one-platoon system for 1953, gradually liberalizing substitution rules until a full return to two-platoon football was made in 1964.

One-platoon football is seen currently mostly on lower-end and smaller teams at the high school and semi-pro levels, where player shortages and talent disparities necessitate it. Current teams with sufficient numbers of talented players no longer use the one-platoon system.

== History ==
=== The platoon system in college football ===
Before 1941, virtually all football players saw action on "both sides of the ball," alternating in both offensive and defensive roles. A player who had been replaced by a substitute could not, in the early years of the game, return to the contest—this restriction eased over time.

Player re-entry was first allowed during the 1910 season, described as "as a player who has been removed from the game for any reason except disqualification or suspension may engage in the contest again at the beginning of any subsequent quarter, but the substitution of any such player is allowed but once during a quarter." In 1922, the rule was changed such that a player removed during the first half could not return to the field until the second half, while a player removed in the second half was lost for the game. From 1932 until 1940, another substitution rule was used, which stated, "A player may be substituted for another at any time, but a player withdrawn from the game may not return in the same period or intermission in which he was withdrawn." This is to say that, once removed for a substitute, a player was lost to his team for the duration of the quarter. Illegal return of a player to the field was regarded as a severe infraction of the rules, with the returning player ejected from the game and his team assessed a massive 25-yard penalty.

Substitutions under this "one-platoon system" were thus made individually and strategically based upon time on the clock, field position, and player exhaustion.

A major change in the governing rules of the sport was made ahead of the 1941 college football season. Instead of removed players being lost for the quarter, a new unlimited substitution rule was implemented, providing simply, "A player may be substituted for another at any time, but such player may not be withdrawn from, nor the outgoing player returned to, the game until one play has intervened."

Although this rule change had the practical effect of allowing alternating mass substitutions of entire squads for offense and defense, such a substitution strategy was not immediately put to use. The first known use of the "two-platoon" system was by Michigan head coach Fritz Crisler in 1945 against an Army team under head coach "Colonel" Earl "Red" Blaik. Although Michigan lost the game 28–7, Crisler's use of eight players who played only on offense, eight who played only on defense, and three that played both ways, impressed Blaik enough for him to adopt it for his own team. Blaik, a former soldier himself, was the one who began using the word "platoon" for this football substitution strategy, in reference to the type of military unit.

Between 1946 and 1950, Blaik's two-platoon teams twice finished the season ranked second in the Associated Press polls and never finished lower than 11th. Success inspired emulation across the country. Team size increased to provide for the increased demand for starting manpower, and the costs of scholarships and travel increased accordingly — putting financial strain on smaller institutions as they attempted to keep up with their larger competitors.

=== Unlimited substitution in pro football ===
The National Football League (NFL) played according to NCAA college rules from its founding in 1920 through 1932. Due to limited roster size, "60-minute men" who played the entire game were not uncommon during the league's first decade. Wellington Mara, son of the founder of the New York Giants and closely associated with the pro game from the 1930s, recalled the importance of conditioning in that era:

"Stamina played a big role in those days, and the players had to pace themselves. They couldn't go all out on every play — you just couldn't do that for 60 minutes of football-playing time. The players against you were under the same handicap, but it still was grueling."

Changes in substitution rules were initially driven by the realities of World War II. Wartime needs for military manpower depleted football rosters as players joined military units. Free substitution — apparently intended to help lesser players by allowing longer rest breaks — was implemented in a rule change made April 7, 1943, "for the duration" of the war effort. This was paired with a one-year rule change made in August reducing the size of wartime NFL rosters from 33 players to 28, in an effort to reduce the impact of travel to and from games.

The free substitution rule was renewed for another year at the April owners' meeting in 1944, and again in 1945.

In 1946, with the war over, roster size was expanded to the pre-war 33-man limit. At the same time, there was a desire to balance the one-platoon tradition with the trend towards mass substitutions, so a rule was adopted limiting player substitutions to no more than three men at a time. The roster limit was expanded to 35 players in 1948, but the 3-at-a-time rule remained in place.

A move back to unlimited free substitution was made for another one year trial in the 1949 NFL season, but once again this was paired with a reduction rather than an increase in roster size, this time from 35 down to 32. Unlimited free substitution was adopted on a permanent basis on January 23, 1950, with rosters gradually growing from 32 to 36 players ahead of the 1959 NFL season.

Despite the NCAA's return to the one-platoon system in 1953, the NFL has maintained unlimited free substitution since 1949.

=== NCAA return to the one-platoon system ===
Starting with the 1953 season, the NCAA emplaced a set of new rules requiring the use of a one-platoon system, primarily for financial reasons. While a few sources may indicate that only one player was allowed to be substituted between plays, according to the NCAA, the actual rule allowed a player to enter the game only once in each quarter. More precisely, a player leaving the game in the first or third quarter could not return until the beginning of the next quarter, and a player leaving the game in the second or fourth quarter could not return until the final four minutes of that quarter. Tennessee head coach "General" Robert Neyland praised the change as the end of "chickenshit football".

NCAA substitution rules were gradually liberalized over the next 11 seasons.

=== Elimination of the one-platoon system ===
For the 1964 season, the NCAA repealed the rules enforcing its use and allowed an unlimited number of player substitutions. This allowed, starting with the 1964 season, teams to form separate offensive and defensive units as well as "special teams" which would be employed in kicking situations. By the early 1970s, however, some university administrators, coaches and others were calling for a return to the days of one-platoon football.

=== Arena football ===
The sport of arena football used a limited one-platoon system (from which quarterbacks, kickers and one "specialist" were exempt) from its inception until 2007. The 2024 revival of the Arena Football League reintroduced the system in what proved to be its only season but abandoned it after three weeks.

== See also ==
- Substitution (sport)
