= 2025 International Football Alliance season =

American football league

- League: International Football Alliance
- Sport: American football
- Duration: May 31, 2025 – September 14, 2025
- Teams: 5 (planned)
- TV partner: Prime Video (planned)

Seasons
- 2026 →

The 2025 International Football Alliance (IFA) season was the first season of the short-lived cross-border professional American football league that aimed to operate teams in both the United States and Mexico. The season was marred by instability, financial controversy, and multiple team withdrawals, leading analysts and reporters to describe it as one of the most chaotic launches in alternative football history.

== Background ==
The International Football Alliance (IFA) was introduced in 2023 as a bi-national professional football venture connecting American and Mexican teams. Early marketing touted partnerships with established pro franchises such as the Texas Pioneros, Chihuahua Rebelión and Tampa Tornadoes with two newcomers, the Alabama Beavers and Ohio Valley Ironmen.

The 2025 season was set to begin on 'May 31, 2025, when Dallas faced Chihuahua in the league's first broadcast on Amazon Prime Video.

== Season Instability ==
Despite ambitious plans, numerous operational failures began to surface even before the regular season. on April 14, 2025 both the Alabama Beavers and the IFA issued separate statements mutually announcing the Beavers were out of the IFA. The sides differed on who initiated, with the IFA issuing a cease and desist order alleging felony fraud and unpaid bills in the tens of thousands of dollars that had caused the IFA to be permanently banned from Embassy Suites hotels; the Beavers responded that it had left the league April 10 after unsuccessfully attempting to negotiate a better deal and would play in another league in 2025. The next day, in an interview with X Fan Show, IFA representative Mark Lozano indicated that only three teams were still committed to the 2025 season: Ohio Valley, Tampa and Chihuahua; the Pioneros had suspended operations until 2026 and San Antonio had not decided whether or not to continue (it ultimately would not). Ohio Valley's revised schedule consisted mostly of midwestern teams in Michigan and Cincinnati along with the Erie Express, with San Antonio the only other IFA team on the Ironmen's schedule; a statement on the IFA Facebook page described the Ironmen as being "affiliated" with the IFA. Chihuahua's schedule was released April 30, a six-game, mostly home-based schedule against teams in the southern United States with the only IFA opponent (and only road game) being a home-and-home series with Tampa.

Three weeks before the start of the season, the IFA announced that an Alabama franchise would indeed play that season, as Anthony Richardson agreed to take over the Beavers' franchise, coaches and player contracts and dubbed his team the Huntsville Astros. Richardson's attempted purchase of the Beavers from its owner formed the basis of the IFA's expulsion of the Beavers.

Three days before the start of the season it was reported that the San Antonio Caballeros would cease operations, while head coach and owner Hal Mumme would later be announced as the new offensive coordinator of the Centenary College.

Six days after their first game, the Chihuahua Rebelión announced via the team's Instagram account that the primary investors of the team were "disassociating" themselves from head coach Mauricio Balderrama and general manager Diógenes Guzmán due to claims of "misconduct and abuses by these individuals." Coach Balderrama responded to this on the team's secondary Facebook page and claimed that the Instagram account had been hacked. The IFA did not release a statement verifying either account.

On June 5, 2025, CJ Drinkard, owner of the Alabama Beavers, posted on his Facebook page that "in September 2024, I conducted an investigation and found some rather disturbing evidence. I contacted the league (IFA) and let them know there are players, coaches, and league officials who have direct ties to child porn. After I reported my findings to Jason Adams, I also let him know that there are several players within the league that are registered sex offenders and we need to be sure all of the teams are conducting background checks." Drinkard further alleged that "after doing a thorough check on Jason Adams' background, I see he has over 15 arrests that are rather disturbing. He has been arrested for multiple counts of forgery, impersonating a police officer, theft, among many other things that now make sense to me. He forged documents regarding members within the league to manipulate everyone along the way." Drinkard also published multiple screenshots depicting Jason Adams’ prior arrest mugshots and a copy of his criminal background report.

On June 13, 2025, one day before their first game of the season, the Tampa Bay Tornadoes announced that they were leaving the IFA to be an independent team, but would still play the IFA teams on their season schedule, after a key investor had withdrawn his funding. Following this announcement, their game on June 14 was cancelled.

On June 13, 2025, the IFA released a statement on Instagram announcing that they had suspended the Chihuahua Rebelión's planned games due to an unspecified issue and that the team would resume games on July 5. This was later updated to a return on July 19. The league's official statement was that head coach Mauricio Baldarrama had taken undisclosed actions against the team's investor group, which "caused significant financial and moral harm." Along with temporarily suspending games the IFA fired Baldarrama & hired Les Koenning as the new head coach. Later that day, the Rebelión announced on their secondary Facebook page that they were leaving the IFA to go independent. In their official statement they claimed that their decision was due to "...multiple administrative, financial and ethical irregularities within the organization of said league, as well as to the direct relationship of its high command with individuals currently under international investigation by the FBI, which generates an environment of uncertainty for our team and its members.".

On June 22, 2025, eight hours before their game against the Huntsville Astros, the Tornadoes announced on Facebook that they would be suspending operations for the rest of the 2025 season.

On June 27, 2025, the Ohio Valley Ironmen cancelled the remainder of their season due to "multiple scheduled opponents" pulling out of games. The Ironmen finished the season with no known financial issues and drew between 750 and 1,200 fans on average to their games. The team stated they planned to return in 2026.

On July 11, 2025, the Chihuahua Rebelión revealed to its players that the team was out of money after its first home game only drew 200 paying spectators and that it would not be able to resume play or further compensate its players, effectively stranding the 19 American players and one British player (Germain Brown) in Mexico. As reported in El Pueblo, "the [Chihuahua] team couldn't cover the expenses of everything behind a professional sports team, from the physical trainers and medical staff to treat injuries to paying for medical insurance in the event of sports injuries, in a game of full contact," and "when the players arrived in Chihuahua, they were accommodated in a renowned hotel in the capital with all expenses and food paid. But suddenly, the players declared, [coach] Mauricio Balderrama told them that they had to vacate the hotel and for the time being pay for their own lodging while they obtained new sponsors."

On July 15, 2025, scout Frederick Elliott announced on his Facebook page that the Huntsville Astros notified the IFA of their intent to withdraw from the league and complete the 2025 season independently. Elliott is quoted as stating "this move comes after the team faced numerous operational and administrative challenges from the league throughout the 2025 season." On July 23, head coach Shane Anderson confirmed Huntsville had left the league and that the Astros would join a new league in the coming year.

On July 17, 2025, the IFA announced that the Chihuahua Rebellion were rebranding and moving to Ciudad Juárez. The league website claimed they would return to play on August 23. The league also indicated that it would rush the Arkansas Storm, a team it had originally planned to hold out of the league until 2026 to allow it time to properly build, into playing shape to play a showcase game in August, just one month after tryouts. The showcase was eventually held on September 13, with the semi-pro Dallas Prime hosting the Storm at the Ford Center at The Star; after an initially competitive first half, the Prime dominated and shut out the makeshift Storm roster—an organization so haphazardly assembled that several players relied on bringing their own equipment rather than the years-old and moldy pads Adams had furnished, and resorted to fashioning the numbers on their plain red jerseys with medical tape—to finish the game with a 47–7 victory. Several Storm players indicated that the team ownership and front office were displeased with Adams's handling of the event and were considering other options. On October 2, 2025, Coy Flynn, owner of the Arkansas Storm, stated on Facebook that the team would not be competing in the 2026 season, alluded to a future lawsuit, and stated "retribution is coming."

On September 9, 2025, it was announced that the Ohio Valley Ironmen were officially leaving the league to join the new iteration of the Continental Football League.

== Teams ==
=== Planned teams ===
Team	City	Stadium	Capacity	Coach	Players	Fate
Mexico
Chihuahua Rebelión	Juárez City, Chihuahua	Estadio Olímpico Universitario	22,000	Mauricio Balderrama		Suspended after 1 game
United States
Huntsville Astros	Huntsville, Alabama	Joe W. Davis Stadium	6,000	Shane Anderson		Created after the Alabama Beavers left the IFA and took over the Beavers' franchise, coaches and player contracts, but withdrew after 3 games and left to the Professional Independent Football League (PIFL)
Ohio Valley Ironmen	Moundsville, West Virginia	Monarch Stadium	5,200	Manny Matsakis		Cancelled season after 3 games, citing other teams’ unwillingness to face them. later joined the Continental Football League (CoFL)
San Antonio Caballeros	San Antonio, Texas	Gayle and Tom Benson Stadium	6,000	Hal Mumme		Ceased operations before season after they couldn't secure a venue
Tampa Tornadoes	Tampa, Florida	Leto High School	5,000	Stevie Thomas		Withdrew after start of the season before playing any games
Texas Pioneros	Georgetown, Texas	Bernard Birkelbach Field	11,000	Art Briles		Originally the Dallas Pioneros, moved to Georgetown after they couldn't secure a stadium in the Dallas–Fort Worth metroplex, but later suspended operations until 2026

2026 expansion teams participant in exhibitions game
Team	City	Stadium	Capacity	Head coach
Arkansas Storm	North Little Rock, Arkansas	Wildcat Stadium	5,482	Ron Calcagni

=== Teams included in the final 2025 schedule ===
2025 Schedule

- Huntsville Astros (Huntsville, Alabama)
- Ohio Valley Ironmen (Moundsville, West Virginia)
- Tampa Tornadoes (Tampa, Florida)
- Chihuahua Rebelión (Chihuahua, Mexico)

Due to teams withdrawing, cancelling, and suspending their seasons, the IFA filled out the 2025 schedule with regional amateur teams. This included the

- Cincinnati Dukes (Cincinnati, Ohio) - played 2025 season in the Blue Collar Football League.
- Dallas Prime (Dallas, Texas) - played 2025 season in the Texas United Football League, later a "IFA Showcase Team"
- Erie Express (Erie, Pennsylvania) - played 2025 season in the Premier Amateur Football League.
- Tennessee Hornets (Winchester, Tennessee) - IFA Showcase Team
- Up 1 Athletic Showcase (Atlanta, Georgia) - An independent team

Other announced teams (never played):

- Michigan Bills (Monroe, Michigan) - played 2025 season in the Players Football Association
- Mississippi Brawlers (Woodville, Mississippi) - played 2025 season in the Next Level Football Alliance
- Texas Herd (Longview, Texas) - Texas All-Star Team.
- Washington Hawks (Washington, Pennsylvania) - played 2025 season in the Tripoint Football League

== Players ==
Each team was to carry a 53-man roster (40 active on game day) and seven players on the practice squad, with a maximum of 20 American players (similar to the Canadian Football League), with a goal of attracting international players. The players would be selected after participating in IFA-organized combine tryouts. Each team would carry two quarterbacks on the active roster and one on the practice squad. Players with dual citizenship (United States + 1 country) may be submitted against either the 20 American player cap or the 33 International player cap (per team). For the 2025 season, each team will carry 53 man roster with a minimum of 5 international players.

=== Compensation ===
Salaries were first reported as "similar" to the ELF, XFL, and USFL. The league later announced that "player pay will be determined per team, with league standards are $400–$1500 per game," but the league would later state that all players will get paid $400 per game, while only active QB's making $1500 per game. During training camp the players would make $100 per-week, plus room and board.

Although the league didn't followed those set of rules for the 2025 season, it was later revealed that the Huntsville Astros paid all its players between $400-$750, while the QB received $1,200. Additionally they also provided housing for their players during the season. Ironmen owner Manny Matsakis would later state that the players received salary similar to the "top indoor leagues".

=== Draft ===
The Inaugural Draft was held March 21, 2025 in Huntsville, Alabama, at The US Space and Rocket Center. The draft consisted of six rounds total. The draft pool included recent college graduates, professional players who received an invite after league tryout and players with experience in other professional football leagues. According to reports, "more than 500 players have entered the IFA Draft pool".

The original plan was for the draft to be held for two days (March 21-22, 2025) and consist of eight rounds. The first three rounds were supposed to be confined to international and dual citizen athletes, but that never materialized.

==== 2025 IFA Draft ====
Rnd.	Pick #	Team	Player	Position	College	Graduated
1	1	Alabama Beavers	Najeem Hosein	DB	Ferris State	2020
1	2	Rebelión Tarahumara	Diondre Borel	QB	Utah State	2011
1	3	Ohio Valley Ironmen	Tre Johnson	OL	Jackson State	2022
1	4	San Antonio Caballeros	Larry Williams	OL	Oklahoma State	2018
1	5	Tampa Tornadoes	Henry Kellogg	DE/OLB	College of DuPage	2019
1	6	Texas Pioneros	Tayon Fleet-Davis	RB	Maryland	2022
2	7	Texas Pioneros	Alex Heil	OL	Cincinnati	2020
2	8	Tampa Tornadoes	Jordan Stenhouse	DL	Johnson C. Smith	2025
2	9	San Antonio Caballeros	Shannon Brooks	RB	Minnesota	2020
2	10	Ohio Valley Ironmen	Chantz Williams	DE	Charlotte	2025
2	11	Rebelión Tarahumara	Maurice Woodard	WR	Lincoln University	2014
2	12	Alabama Beavers	Reggie Anderson	WR	Nebraska Kearney	2025
3	13	Alabama Beavers	De'Jahn Warren	DB	Jackson State	2023
3	14	Rebelión Tarahumara	Darrell Tate	RB	Maryville College	2011
3	15	Ohio Valley Ironmen	Tai'yon Devers	DE	Minnesota	2020
3	16	San Antonio Caballeros	Ryan Atkins	OL	Arkansas–Pine Bluff	2024
3	17	Tampa Tornadoes	Matthew Considine	QB	Toledo	2023
3	18	Texas Pioneros	Nashawn Jackson	OL	California (PA)	2025
4	19	Texas Pioneros	Sergio Pimentel	DE/OLB	UAG Guadalajara	
4	20	Tampa Tornadoes	Antoine Williams	LB	Western Carolina	2025
4	21	San Antonio Caballeros	Tyrone Griffin	DE/OLB	Lindenwood	2025
4	22	Ohio Valley Ironmen	Josh Holley	LB	Morgan State	2019
4	23	Rebelión Tarahumara	Treydonte Hill	WR	Tabor College	2018
4	24	Alabama Beavers	Ronald Withers	OL	Pikeville	2024
5	25	Alabama Beavers	Evyn Cooper	DB	Purdue	2016
5	26	Rebelión Tarahumara	Gary Bourrage Jr.	LB	Allen	2024
5	27	Ohio Valley Ironmen	CJ Wright	DL	Georgia Southern	2022
5	28	San Antonio Caballeros	Noel Ofori-Nyadu	OL	Connecticut	2024
5	29	Tampa Tornadoes	Garry Fleming	WR	Peru State	2024
5	30	Texas Pioneros	Caleb Wells	DE	Angelo State	2019
6	31	Texas Pioneros	Daniel Trejo	K/P	Texas	2023
6	32	Tampa Tornadoes	Cory Gammage	WR	Central Florida	2024
6	33	San Antonio Caballeros	Aaron Dilworth	WR	Texas A&M–Kingsville	2020
6	34	Ohio Valley Ironmen	Terrance Jones	DL	Idaho State	2023
6	35	Rebelión Tarahumara	Deveraux McCall	DE/OLB	Youngstown State	2015
6	36	Alabama Beavers	Tajih Alston	DE	Colorado	2023

== Coaches ==
In August 2023, ESPN reported that the IFA hired former Baylor coach Art Briles as the head coach of Dallas Pioneers and the league confirmed that report later that day. The same report also mentioned that Noel Mazzone will coach Tequileros de Jalisco, while Nick Rolovich will coach one of the American teams and Hal Mumme will coach one of the Mexican teams. Rolovich later signed with the XFL's Seattle Sea Dragons, but was let go amid the XFL-USFL merger, and was interviewed for the IFA Portland position. On January 19, 2024 Adam Rita was interview for the Cancun Sharks head coaching position. In January, 2024 Noel Mazzone was announced as the Head Coach for IFA Portland. (Mazzone would depart for the Memphis Showboats when the Portland team failed to materialize.) In June, 2024 Hal Mumme was announced as the head coach for IFA San Antonio. In August 2024, Eric Marty announced he had accepted the head coaching position of a theretofore-unannounced IFA member, the Baltimore Lightning of Baltimore, Maryland, which had played the 2023 season in the Gridiron Developmental Football League. Marty accepted a position at the College of the Sequoias shortly before the Lightning split from the IFA. In late October, 2024 Manny Matsakis was announced as the General Manager and Head Coach of the newly joined Ohio Valley Ironmen. Former Pittsburgh and Arizona State head coach Todd Graham was slated to be the Defensive coordinator of the Texas Pioneros for the 2025 season.

== Schedule ==
=== Planned schedule ===
- May 31, 2025 – San Antonio vs. Ohio Valley | Tampa Bay @ Alabama (was billed as the "IFA Kickoff Classic")| Texas @ Chihuahua
- June 7, 2025 – Alabama vs. Ohio Valley | Texas @ San Antonio | Tampa Bay @ Chihuahua
- June 14, 2025 – Ohio Valley vs. Tampa Bay | Texas @ Alabama | San Antonio @ Chihuahua
- June 21, 2025 – Tampa Bay vs. Texas | Alabama @ San Antonio | Chihuahua @ Ohio Valley
- June 28, 2025 – BYE WEEK
- July 5, 2025 – Tampa Bay vs. Ohio Valley | San Antonio @ Texas | Alabama vs. Chihuahua
- July 12, 2025 – Ohio Valley vs. Alabama | San Antonio @ Tampa Bay | Chihuahua @ Texas
- July 19, 2025 – Ohio Valley vs. Texas | Alabama @ Tampa Bay | Chihuahua @ San Antonio
- July 26, 2025 – Ohio Valley vs. San Antonio | Tampa Bay vs. Chihuahua | Texas @ Alabama (July 24th)
- August 2, 2025 – Semi-Final Round*
- August 9, 2025 – Championship Game

* Top four teams will advance to the playoffs. The top seed will host each game.

=== Actual schedule ===
Week	Date	Time	Home team	Score	Opponent	Score	Site	Notes	Ref
Week 1	May 31	Kickoff 7:00 p.m. CT	Chihuahua Rebelión	0	Dallas Prime	16	Estadio Olímpico Universitario		
Week 1	June 1	Kickoff 6:30 p.m. CT	Huntsville Astros	45	Tennessee Hornets	0	Milton Frank Stadium		
Week 2	June 7	Kickoff 7:00 p.m. ET	Ohio Valley Ironmen	45	Cincinnati Dukes	0	Monarch Stadium		
Week 3	June 14	Kickoff 7:00 p.m. ET	Ohio Valley Ironmen	39	Erie Express	0	Monarch Stadium		
Week 4	June 21	Kickoff 7:00 p.m. ET	Ohio Valley Ironmen	82	Tennessee Hornets	0	Monarch Stadium		
Week 5	June 29	Kickoff 6:30 p.m. CT	Huntsville Astros	50	UP 1 Athletic	0	Milton Frank Stadium		
Week 6	July 13	Kickoff 6:00 p.m. CT	Huntsville Astros	52	Dallas Prime	30	Milton Frank Stadium		
Week 7	July 27		~~Huntsville Astros~~		~~MS Brawlers~~		~~Milton Frank Stadium~~	cancelled	
Week 8	August 2		~~Dallas Prime~~		~~Huntsville Astros~~		~~Mansfield Summit High School~~	cancelled	
Week 9	August 23		~~Juarez Rebels~~		~~Texas Herd~~		~~Estadio 20 de Noviembre~~	cancelled	
Week 10	August 30		~~Juarez Rebels~~		~~Tennessee Hornets~~		~~Estadio 20 de Noviembre~~	cancelled	
Exhibition	August 30		~~Arkansas Storm~~		~~Mexico City All-Star Team~~		~~Wildcat Stadium~~	cancelled	
Exhibition	September 13	Kickoff 7:00 p.m. CT	Arkansas Storm	7	Dallas Prime	47	Ford Center at the Star		

== Collapse and Fallout ==
Throughout summer 2025, IFA games were repeatedly canceled as teams folded or lost opponents. The Ohio Valley Ironmen eventually announced the conclusion of their 2025 season after “a wave of opponent cancellations,” citing plans for a 2026 relaunch.

The IFA pledged teams such as the Chihuahua Rebellion, San Antonio Caballeros, Dallas Pioneros and Tampa Bay Tornadoes, but due to financial mismanagement, leadership conflicts and ethical and safety allegations it collapsed almost as soon as it began operations in 2025. Details about the Rebellion operation raised serious accusations including players being stranded abroad without pay, being asked to use personal relationships for lodging, inadequate safety conditions (such as lacking well-fitting helmets and proper medical coverage), and legal action by players against the league and team ownership.

== Exhibition ==
Following the collapse of formal league play, the IFA attempted to regain attention with an Exhibition Showcase held on September 14, 2025, between the Dallas Prime and Arkansas Storm at The Star in Frisco, Texas. The event, initially marketed as a “showcase game,” was later rebranded as an exhibition meant to “review players for camp invites.”

Despite some organizational improvements, coverage described the exhibition as “messy,” with mismatched uniforms, limited staffing, and a lack of commentary or official production.

== Aftermath ==
By the end of 2025, the International Football Alliance was largely considered defunct. Most of its teams had ceased operations or pivoted to other minor leagues such as the Professional Independent Football League (PIFL) and Continental Football League (CoFL). Former IFA staff and coaches, including Noel Mazzone, later joined other established organizations such as the United Football League (UFL).

While most believe the IFA's dissolution, there was no official statement about the league ceasing operation, and in September 2025 public communication from the IFA social media insist they will return for a 2026 season.

== Media ==
The IFA had represented it secured non-exclusive broadcast agreements with multiple outlets prior to its 2025 launch.

In September 2024, they announced that league games will be available in the US through Roku and Tubi (the Tubi deal never materialized). On October 11, 2024 the league announced streaming partnership with Shawne Merriman's Lights Out Sports.

On March 3 2025 the league announced that it has secured a landmark global broadcasting agreement with sports content providers Inverleigh and Unbeaten Sports. Later that month, the IFA announced additional agreements with Unbeaten Sports, a free ad-supported streaming television channel, and Inverleigh, an Australian production company, with the league stating that it would also be streaming games on its YouTube channel.

Notwithstanding the foregoing representations, there have been no broadcasts of any IFA games to date on either Roku or Tubi. Furthermore, there is no evidence of any formal partnership or affiliation between the IFA and Shawne Merriman's Lights Out Sports, Unbeaten Sports, and/or Inverleigh, as no IFA content has ever been broadcast on said media outlets.

The Ohio Valley Ironmen had its games telecast on WTRF, which drew approximately 140,000 views on average (combined linear and streaming views).

== See also ==
- 2025 UFL season
