= American Indoor Football Alliance =

American sports league

- Sport: Indoor football
- Founded: 2021; 5 years ago
- First season: 2022
- Folded: 2023; 3 years ago
- No. of teams: 7
- Country: United States
- Last champion: Columbus Lions (2023)
- Website: www.goaifa.com

The American Indoor Football Alliance (AIFA) was a minor-professional American indoor football league in the United States.

Teams' typical operating budget was $500,000 with a $90,000 payroll budget per season. Players were paid up to $200 per game, with a $25 bonus for participating in charity events within their local communities. Most teams offered players housing during the season.

== History ==
After the 2021 American Arena League season concluded, four members of the East Division (Carolina Predators, Tampa Bay Tornadoes, Pennsylvania Union and Mississippi Raiders) announced that they would leave the AAL to form a new league, after league president and commissioner Tony Zefiretto had sold the league to the ownership.

The league played its first season in 2022, while the Mississippi Raiders defeat the Las Vegas Kings 55–12 to claim the Inaugural AIFA Championship.

For the 2023 season, AIFA had an inter-league scheduling agreement with the American West Football Conference. The Columbus Lions won the league championship after completing an undefeated season and beating Mississippi Raiders 55 to 10 in AIFA Championship.

In late 2023 most of the teams left to join different leagues and the AIFA website was shut down.

== Teams ==
Teams that participated or were listed as members in the 2023 season.

Team	Home city	Home venue	Capacity	Founded	Joined	Head coach	Fate
Carolina Predators	Fayetteville, North Carolina	traveling team		2018	2021	Ralph Byrd	AAL2
Columbus Lions	Columbus, Georgia	Columbus Civic Center	7,573	2007	2022	Chris McKinney	AIF
Capital City Cyclones	Tallahassee, Florida	traveling team		2019	2021	Stevie Thomas	IFA
Las Vegas Kings	Bullhead City, Arizona	Anderson Auto Group Fieldhouse	7,000	2021	2021	Chris Wallace	IFA
Mississippi Raiders	Batesville, Mississippi	Paul Battle Arena & Exposition Center	6,500	2019	2021	Montra Edwards	AIF
South Florida Thunder	Palm Beach, Florida	Margate Sports Complex	TBA	2019	2022	Taliferro James Jr	Folded
Dallas Falcons	San Antonio, Texas	M.Vidrio Soccer Complex	TBA	2022	2023	Bryan Kensky	AAL2

=== Former teams ===
- Florida Fear (Bradenton, Florida) - Was part of announced teams, but never played
- Memphis Beatz (Memphis, Tennessee) - Was part of announced teams, but never played
- Pennsylvania Union (Harrisburg, Pennsylvania) — Was part of the original teams joined from the AAL, but then was not included in 2022 alignment. Now a member of American Indoor Football as of 2026.
- St. Charles Bandits (St. Charles, Missouri) — Joined from the AAL for the 2022 season, but never played a game.
- Texas Pride (Garland, Texas) – Was part of the announced teams of the crossover games with the American West Football Conference (AWFC) for the 2023 season, but then was not included in the league standings.
