= International Football Alliance =

Professional American football league

- Most recent season or competition: 2025 IFA season
- Sport: American football
- Founded: 2023
- First season: 2025
- Owner: Jason Bradly Adams
- Country: United States
- Headquarters: 1716 W Shoshone Ave, Nampa, ID 83651 (Adams' residence)
- Related competitions: FAM, AIFA, CoFL
- Website: www.ifa.football

The International Football Alliance (IFA) was a failed, low-level outdoor, 11-man American football summer minor league that attempted to operate internationally in both Mexico and the United States. It was owned by Jason Bradly Adams and operated from his residence in Nampa, Idaho.

The IFA's inaugural season began play in 2025; initially intending to have six teams, only three of which played any games. The season collapsed entirely within a month of its opening game. The league attempted to return in 2026 but ceased operation before the season start.

== Premise ==
The IFA's aim was to "deliver the highest level of American football," and "build a unified and solid American football ecosystem in Mexico," while the league mission statement read: "The International Football Alliance mission is bridging the gap in international professional football by delivering the highest level of American Football within the locations of Mexico and the United States, implementing NFL based standard rules of play, and creating an international alliance. Together with our team ownership, teams, players, and fans, we will work to build a unified and solid football ecosystem to grow American football in Mexico".

== History ==
The IFA was announced on January 25, 2023, in a press conference held by commissioner Juan Manuel Bladé. Bladé revealed that the league was to consist of 6 teams—3 in Mexico and 3 in the United States. It was later revealed that 4 of them were derived from the now-defunct Fútbol Americano de México league (Guadalajara Tequileros, Chihuahua Rebellion, Cancun Sharks and Pioneros de Querétaro who moved to Dallas and were named "Dallas Pioneros"). Dallas was the only American city announced, although the commissioner mentioned a potential additional team in El Paso. In August 2023, ESPN reported that San Diego will be the sixth location, and that Art Briles and Noel Mazzone were the first coaches to be assigned to a team (Dallas Pioneers and Tequileros de Jalisco, respectively) while the league also hired Nick Rolovich and Hal Mumme. In October 2023, El Paso, Texas, was removed from the official website. On November 29, 2023, the league announced Las Vegas as its second US location after the Las Vegas Kings joined from the American Indoor Football Alliance. On December 19, 2023 the league announced its sixth team – the Gulf Coast Tarpons, but a month later the team was removed from the league website, while adding Mexico City as "targeted Location". As of January 2024, league "Commissioner" Juan Manuel Bladé was removed from the official website and longer appeared to be associated with the IFA.

The league announced tryouts for its first season in San Diego, California (July 29, 2023); Melissa, Texas (August 20, 2023); Riviera Beach, Florida (September 9, 2023); Cincinnati, Ohio (October 7, 2023); Fort Lauderdale, Florida (October 21, 2023); Atlanta, Georgia (November 11, 2023); and internationally, in Cologne, Germany, on December 10, 2023 (moved from Birmingham, England). The IFA Mexico Combine was held on December 3, 2023, in Mexico City, at Patriots Field (was open to all Mexican nationals).

In January, 2024 the league announced their plans to push the inaugural season to 2025, after securing only five teams for 2024. The IFA also announced four more teams for 2025 in Tampa Bay, Florida (Tampa Bay Tornadoes), Huntsville, Alabama (Alabama Beavers), Portland, Oregon (under the name PDX) and Louisiana (Gulf Coast Tarpons), while the later two would be removed from the website on later date. In June, 2024 San Antonio was announced as the league eighth team. Las Vegas withdrew from the league in October, 2024 and began pursuing an Arena Football One franchise. On October 25, 2024, after months of speculations, the IFA announced the six teams to be playing the 2025 season: Alabama, Baltimore, Dallas, San Antonio, Tampa and Chihuahua. Five days later, a seventh team named the Ohio Valley Ironmen was added, without mentioning where the team will play. In December, the league reported they are vetting three potential expansion teams in Georgia, Ohio and Mexico.

Both the Baltimore Lightning and the IFA issued separate statements in early January 2025 mutually announcing the Lightning were out of the IFA, but differed on who initiated; the IFA stated that the teams had voted the Lightning out of the league, while the Lightning stated it had left voluntarily. One month later, Baltimore Lightning owner Will Hanna sued the IFA and owner Jason Adams seeking, among other things, an injunction against the league and accusing Adams of defrauding other franchises, including those that had departed or folded prior to the season, with Adams responding that it was the Lightning who were defrauding the leagues in which it was a member and that the suit had no merit. On February 25, United States District Judge Russell denied Mr. Hanna's Motion for Preliminary Injunction against the IFA.

On February 28, 2025, the IFA announced the Arkansas Storm, owned by Coy Flynn and coached by Ron Calcagni, as its newest expansion franchise. The team was first reported of one of the inaugural teams in the Major League Football (MLF). The Storm was set to begin play in the 2026 season. In March, the Pioneros, owned by the IFA owner Jason Adams, moved from Dallas to Georgetown, Texas after they couldn't secure a stadium in the Dallas–Fort Worth metroplex, and subsequently changed their name to the Texas Pioneros. It was later announced they will sit out until the 2026 season.

=== 2025 season ===
Despite ambitious plans, the 2025 International Football Alliance (IFA) season faced immediate operational failures. On April 14, 2025, the Alabama Beavers and the IFA mutually announced the Beavers' exit from the league amid disputes over unpaid bills, alleged felony fraud, and contractual disagreements; the Beavers claimed they had left earlier to join another league. By April 15, only Ohio Valley, Tampa, and Chihuahua remained committed to the season, while other teams suspended operations or delayed decisions.

Three weeks before the season, Anthony Richardson acquired the Beavers’ franchise, rebranding it as the Huntsville Astros. Shortly before kickoff, the San Antonio Caballeros ceased operations.

Early season turmoil included the Chihuahua Rebelión severing ties with key investors over alleged misconduct by coaching staff, and the Tampa Bay Tornadoes leaving the league to play independently after an investor withdrew funding. Ohio Valley Ironmen canceled the remainder of their season after multiple opponents pulled out. By mid-July, Chihuahua Rebelión was effectively bankrupt, leaving players stranded, and the Huntsville Astros also departed to play independently.

The IFA attempted a late-season revival by relocating Chihuahua to Ciudad Juárez and expediting the Arkansas Storm into league play; the September 13 exhibition ended in a 47–7 victory for the Dallas Prime, highlighting the makeshift nature of the Storm roster. By October 2025, the Ohio Valley Ironmen left the IFA to join the reformed Continental Football League.

=== Planned 2026 season ===
Despite none of the founding or announced expansion teams entering the 2026 season, the IFA pushed forward and claimed they confirmed six core locations for the 2026 season -four in the United States and two in Mexico - while the league also considering the addition of two expansion franchises. On September 19, 2025, it was announced that the Dallas Prime would be promoted from a showcase team to a full member of the league. On October 2, the league announced that they were adding the Texas Herd and the Ft. Worth Drive. No update was given about the Arkansas Storm.

In the beginning of October, the league announced "the IFA Full Go Event", which will take place in January 24–25, 2026. The event will feature eight participating teams from México and the United States, including U18 women's game and a Collegiate All-Star Game (the Mayan Bowl). The Mayan Bowl (originally Tazón Maya) was a separate organization that featured American college graduates against ONEFA all-star team and was first played in 2024. The Mayan Bowl was later moved from January 24 to January 10, but was cancelled the day of the event.

On October 27, the IFA announced in their website that they are launching two new initiatives: the previously announced Mayan Bowl "showcasing standout recent college graduates seeking exposure and professional opportunities" (coached by Noel Mazzone, Hue Jackson and Antonio Tajonar); and an International Travel Team representing the IFA and the United States in global competitions against national and professional teams from other countries. Through these initiatives, "the IFA aims to create a pathway from college to professional football while fostering a unified international football community".

On November 8, the league announced the addition of the Georgia Rebels as the fourth team for the 2026 season. On December 18, 2025 the San Angelo Stampede were announced as the fifth team for the 2026 season. Later that month, the IFA announced an "exhibition showcase" game scheduled for January 10, 2026 between Ft. Worth Drive and the Pharr Phantoms (Pharr, TX). This game was never materialized.

On December 23, 2025, the league announced the 6th and final team for the 2026 season, PNW Football. The team was originally created to play in the IFA's Full Go 2026 event. On January 20, 2026, citing the failure for the Full Go 2026 event to materialize, Jason Adams' failure to meet financial obligations, and reimbursements still owed to the team, PNW announced they were leaving the league. A day later the Texas Herd published a statement which accused the league of the same issues, but stopped short on announcing they are dropping out of the league. The Herd instead became an associate member of the Continental Football League.

The 2026 season was scheduled to kickoff on April 11, 2026, but the league ceased social media communications on January 6, 2026 and the season never materialized.

== Teams ==
The IFA had announced 6 founding member cities, 4 of which were derived from the now-defunct Fútbol Americano de México league (with the Pioneros relocating to Dallas), one "El Paso team" and additional unspecified US-based team. Commissioner Juan Manuel Bladé Cavazos stated the IFA would like to have a team in Mexico City upon procurement of a suitable ownership group. Cavazos further stated the plan was to have 10 teams by 2025, split between the 2 countries, while California and Florida are states with prospective member cities.

The number and location of teams changed multiple times, which the IFA attributed to problems with finding "viable ownership;" In January 2025, the IFA announced the six teams to be playing the 2025 season: Alabama, Baltimore, Dallas, San Antonio, Tampa and Chihuahua, with future teams (including an Arkansas team announced in February) not beginning play until 2026. In reality only four teams (Astros, Ironmen, Tornadoes and Rebelión) were included in the final 2025 schedule released by the league.

In January 2026, the IFA announced it will play a 2026 season with six US-based teams each playing a six-game schedule from April 11 through May 16, 2026: Dallas Prime (DeSoto, Texas), Ft. Worth Drive (Ft. Worth, Texas), Georgia Rebels (Brunswick, Georgia), PNW Football (Bothell, Washington), San Angelo Stampede (San Angelo, Texas) and Texas Herd (Longview, Texas). PNW left the league on January 20, 2026

=== Announced teams before cancellation ===
Team	City	Stadium	Capacity	Founded	Joined	Fate
Dallas Prime	DeSoto, Texas	Eagle Stadium	11,000	2020	2025	Continued as exhibition team and played few games against AIF teams.
Fort Worth Drive	Fort Worth, Texas	Farrington Field	18,500	2025	2025	Folded
Georgia Rebels	Brunswick, Georgia	Glynn County Football Stadium	12,000	2025	2025	Folded
San Angelo Stampede	San Angelo, Texas			2025	2025	Folded
Texas Herd	Longview, Texas	Lobo Stadium	9,250	2025	2025	Played few games against AIF teams and later joined the CoFL as a "non-member affiliate".

=== Former members ===
Team	Location	Joined	Departed	Notes
Huntsville Astros	Huntsville, Alabama	2025		Played three games in the IFA 2025 season before withdrawing to complete the season independently.
Ohio Valley Ironmen	Moundsville, West Virginia	2024	2025	Coached by Manny Matsakis; cancelled season after three games due to opponents withdrawing and established the Continental Football League for future play. Folded June 19, 2026 due to sponsor withdrawal.
Tampa Bay Tornadoes	Tampa, Florida	2024	2025	Withdrew after the start of the 2025 season due to investor funding withdrawal. Plans on returning to arena football.
Chihuahua Rebelión	Chihuahua, Mexico	2024	2025	Suspended operations after first home game due to financial and administrative issues; later rebranded and relocated to Ciudad Juárez, but never played.
Pioneros de Querétaro / Dallas Pioneros	Dallas, Texas	2023	2025	Relocated from Querétaro to Dallas; coached by Art Briles initially. Planned for inaugural season, first moved to Georgetown, Texas then pushed for the 2026 season and later removed from subsequent plans.
Guadalajara Tequileros	Guadalajara, Mexico	Never played		Originally part of the Liga de Fútbol Americano Profesional; relocated for the IFA. Coached by Noel Mazzone in initial announcements. Franchise did not continue into 2025 season.
Cancun Sharks	Cancun, Mexico	Never played		Announced as a founding Mexican team; Franchise did not continue into 2025 season.
El Paso Team	El Paso, Texas	Never played		Announced as a potential US franchise; removed from website by October 2023 before playing.
Gulf Coast Tarpons	Gulf Coast region, USA	Never played		Initially announced for 2024, removed a month later; later re-announced for 2025 but never materialized.
PDX Team	Portland, Oregon	Never played		Initially announced for 2024, removed from website a month later before playing.
San Diego Team	San Diego, California	Never played		Hosted first IFA tryouts; initially planned as a founding US team but did not play beyond early organizational events.
Las Vegas Kings	Las Vegas, Nevada	Never played		Joined from American Indoor Football Alliance; withdrew in October 2024 to pursue Arena Football One opportunities and played the 2025 season as an independent.
Mexico City Team	Mexico City, Mexico	Never played		Announced as a targeted location for future expansion; never officially fielded a team.
Baltimore Lightning	Baltimore, Maryland	Never played		Announced as a 2025 member but exited before season; later sued the league alleging fraud, lawsuit dismissed.
Alabama Beavers	Huntsville, Alabama	Never played		Announced as a 2025 member but exited before season, and was replaced by the Huntsville Astros. Played independent schedule in 2025. Later announced they are joining the upstart Professional Independent Football League (PIFL)
Arkansas Storm	North Little Rock, Arkansas	2025 (exhibition only)		First announced as a 2026 expansion team but later would be rushed to play an IFA exhibition game against the Dallas Prime, after all other teams withdraw from the league. The team was not included in 2026 alignment.
PNW Football	Bothell, Washington	Never played		The team was originally created to play in the IFA's Full Go 2026 event, but later announced as a full member for the 2026 season. Dropped out of the IFA in January 2026 citing the league misconduct.

Due to teams withdrawing, cancelling, and suspending their seasons, the IFA filled out the 2025 schedule with regional amateur teams. This included the:

- Cincinnati Dukes (Cincinnati, Ohio)
- Dallas Prime (Dallas, Texas)
- Erie Express (Erie, Pennsylvania)
- Tennessee Hornets (Winchester, Tennessee)
- Up 1 Athletic Showcase (Atlanta, Georgia)

== Players ==
Each team was to carry a 53-man roster (40 active on game day) and seven players on the practice squad, with a maximum of 20 American players (similar to the Canadian Football League), with a goal of attracting international players. The players would be selected after participating in IFA-organized combine tryouts. Each team would carry two quarterbacks on the active roster and one on the practice squad. Players with dual citizenship (United States + 1 country) may be submitted against either the 20 American player cap or the 33 International player cap (per team). For the 2025 season, each team will carry 53 man roster with a minimum of 5 international players.

=== Compensation ===
Salaries were first reported as "similar" to the ELF, XFL, and USFL. The league later announced that "player pay will be determined per team, with league standards are $400–$1500 per game," but the league would later state that all players will get paid $400 per game, while only active QB's making $1500 per game. During training camp the players would make $100 per-week, plus room and board.

=== Draft ===
The Inaugural Draft was held March 21, 2025 in Huntsville, Alabama, at The US Space and Rocket Center. The draft consisted of six rounds total. The draft pool included recent college graduates, professional players who received an invite after league tryout and players with experience in other professional football leagues.

== Coaches ==
In August 2023, ESPN reported that the IFA hired former Baylor coach Art Briles as the head coach of Dallas Pioneers and the league confirmed that report later that day. The same report also mentioned that Noel Mazzone will coach Tequileros de Jalisco, while Nick Rolovich will coach one of the American teams and Hal Mumme will coach one of the Mexican teams. Rolovich later signed with the XFL's Seattle Sea Dragons, but was let go amid the XFL-USFL merger, and was interviewed for the IFA Portland position. On January 19, 2024 Adam Rita was interviewed for the Cancun Sharks head coaching position. In January, 2024 Noel Mazzone was announced as the Head Coach for IFA Portland. (Mazzone would depart for the Memphis Showboats when the Portland team failed to materialize.) In June, 2024 Hal Mumme was announced as the head coach for IFA San Antonio. In August 2024, Eric Marty announced he had accepted the head coaching position of a theretofore-unannounced IFA member, the Baltimore Lightning of Baltimore, Maryland, which had played the 2023 season in the Gridiron Developmental Football League. Marty accepted a position at the College of the Sequoias shortly before the Lightning split from the IFA. In late October, 2024 Manny Matsakis was announced as the General Manager and Head Coach of the newly joined Ohio Valley Ironmen. Former Pittsburgh and Arizona State head coach Todd Graham was slated to be the Defensive coordinator of the Texas Pioneros for the 2025 season.

Notwithstanding the foregoing announcements, Art Briles, Noel Mazzone, Nick Rolovich, Hal Mumme, Adam Rita, and Eric Marty are not serving as head coaches within the IFA.

== Season structure ==
As of October 2024, the league had released schedule information indicating the season was to kickoff on May 31, 2025, with the regular season concluding on August 2, 2025. The postseason was to consist of two semi-final matchups between the top two ranked teams in each division, scheduled for August 9, 2025, and the IFA Championship was to be held on August 16, 2025. Locations for the postseason were to be determined.

All games were scheduled for Saturday evenings at either 6 pm or 7 pm local time. All teams would play 4 home games and 4 away games, and all teams would have at least one bye week (the Alabama Beavers and the Tampa Tornadoes woulld have had two bye weeks during the regular season). Venues and times were still to be confirmed for some matchups.

== Media ==
The IFA had represented it secured non-exclusive broadcast agreements with multiple outlets prior to its 2025 launch.

In September 2024, they announced that league games will be available in the US through Roku and Tubi (the Tubi deal never materialized). On October 11, 2024 the league announced streaming partnership with Shawne Merriman's Lights Out Sports. In March 2025, the league announced additional agreements with Unbeaten Sports, a free ad-supported streaming television channel, and Inverleigh, an Australian production company, with the league stating that it would also be streaming games on its YouTube channel.

Notwithstanding the foregoing representations, there have been no broadcasts of any IFA games to date on either Roku or Tubi. Furthermore, there is no evidence of any formal partnership or affiliation between the IFA and Shawne Merriman’s Lights Out Sports, Unbeaten Sports, and/or Inverleigh, as no IFA content has ever been broadcast on said media outlets.

The Ohio Valley Ironmen had its games telecast on WTRF, while the Las Vegas Kings had an agreement to broadcast their games on KVVU-TV.

In January 2026, the league announced that the 2026 season games will be broadcast on Unbeaten Sports.

== Controversy ==
The IFA pledged teams such as the Chihuahua Rebellion, San Antonio Caballeros, Dallas Pioneros and Tampa Bay Tornadoes, but due to financial mismanagement, leadership conflicts and ethical and safety allegations it collapsed almost as soon as it began operations in 2025. Details about the Rebellion operation raised serious accusations including players being stranded abroad without pay, being asked to use personal relationships for lodging, inadequate safety conditions (such as lacking well-fitting helmets and proper medical coverage), and legal action by players against the league and team ownership.

On September 14, 2025 the IFA hosted an exhibition showcase at The Star (Frisco, Texas) in Frisco, Texas, featuring a matchup between the Dallas Prime and the Arkansas Storm. The event, intended to inaugurate the IFA’s 2025 campaign across the U.S. and Mexico, exposed deep operational issues within the league: teams folded or exited throughout the summer, players reportedly weren’t paid, and on-site organization was lacking. The game ended in a 47–7 victory for Dallas, but much of the focus was on the Arkansas Storm’s disorganized setup—players missing standard uniforms, helmets arriving late, and jersey numbers applied with tape. The game operation caused several to question the league professionalism and viability of the 2026 season.

== Personnel ==
- Owner/International Operations Director – Jason Bradly Adams

=== Former personnel ===
IFA staff at the time of the league announcement:

- Commissioner – Juan Manuel Bladé (president of Organización Nacional Estudiantil de Fútbol Americano)
