= Power play =

Period of play in sports in which one team has an advantage

Power play is a term used in various team sports to describe a period of play when one team is given an advantage. In many sports this is numerical advantage in players, usually due to a rule violation by the opposing team.

== Temporary numerical advantage in players ==
In several team sports, situations arise where following a rules infraction, one team is penalized by having the number of players on the field of play temporarily reduced. The term power play is commonly applied to the state of advantage the unpenalized team enjoys during this time. Specialized tactics and strategies can apply while a team is on the power play.

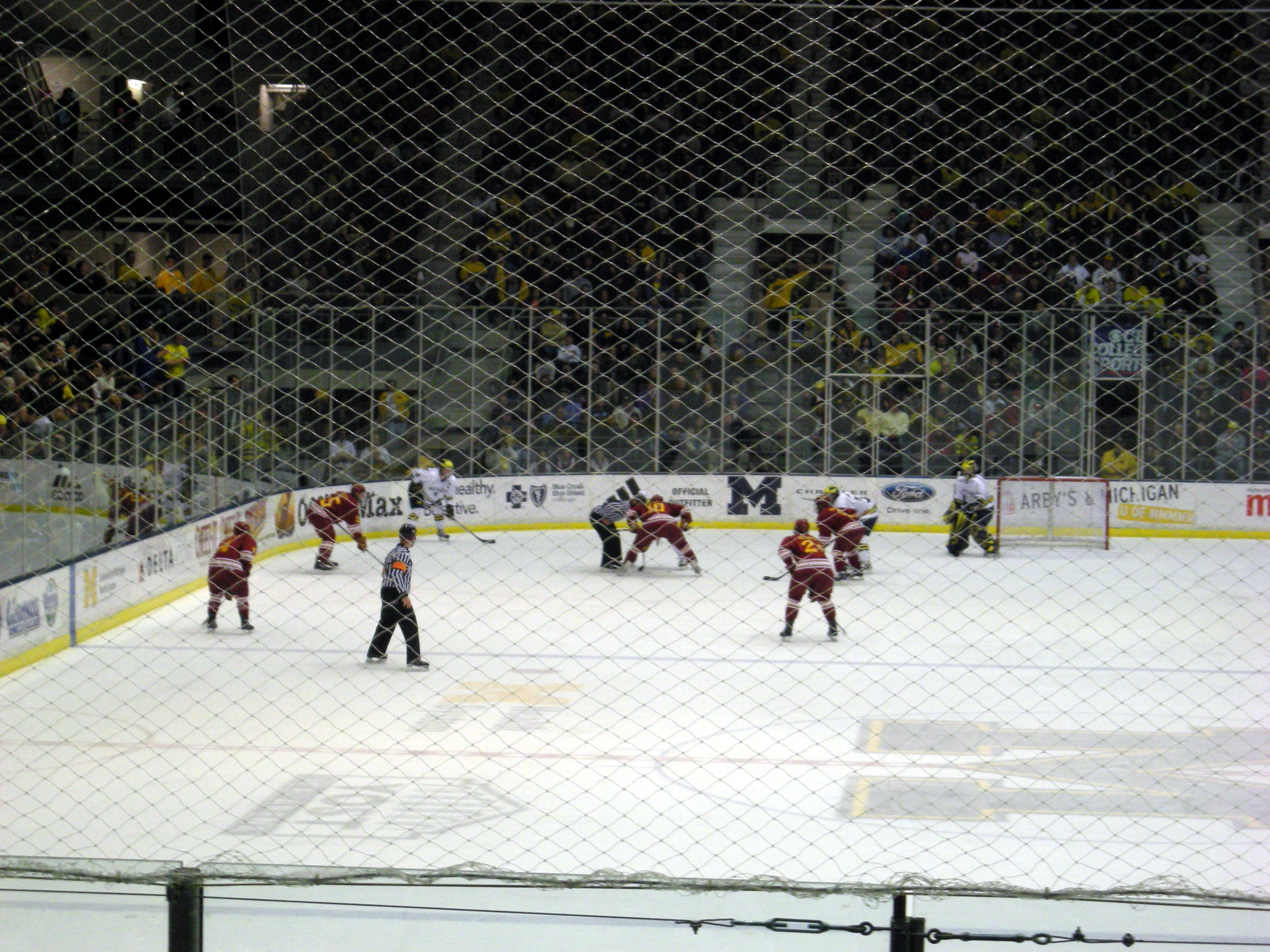
The Ferris State Bulldogs on a five-on-three power play against the Michigan Wolverines.

=== Ice hockey ===
In ice hockey, a team is considered to be on a power play when at least one opposing player is serving a penalty, and the team has a numerical advantage on the ice (whenever both teams have the same number of players on the ice, there is no power play). Up to two players per side may serve in the penalty box without substitutions being permitted, giving a team up to a possible five-on-three power play.

There are three types of penalties that can result in a power play for the non-offending team: minor (two minutes), double-minor (four minutes), and major (five minutes). For such penalties, the offending player is ruled off the ice and no substitute for the penalized player is permitted. If a goaltender commits either a minor, a double-minor, or a major penalty, another player who was on the ice at the time of the penalty would serve the penalty instead. A power play resulting from a minor penalty ends if the team with more players on the ice scores. A double-minor penalty is treated as if the player has committed two minor penalties back to back: a goal scored by the team with advantage in the first two minutes only ends the first minor penalty (and the second will start after the game restarts); a goal by the team with advantage in the last two minutes of the penalty will end the power play even if a goal was scored during the first part of the double-minor penalty. If a player is given a major penalty, a power play occurs, but the power play does not terminate even if the team on the power play scores (except in overtime as this ends the game); a major penalty only ends when five minutes have elapsed or the game has ended. A match penalty results in the offending player being ejected from the game (and the player is subject to possible further suspensions), but it is otherwise treated the same as a major penalty.

If a team is still on a power play at the end of a regulation period, or at the end of a playoff overtime period, the power play will continue into the following period, although they do not carry into the next game of a series during the playoffs. "Misconduct" penalties (10 minutes in duration), and "game misconduct" penalties (offending player is ejected for the balance of the game) allow for substitution of the offending player, so they do not result in power plays. However, in practice, misconduct and game misconduct penalties are often assessed in addition to a major or minor penalty.

Special rules govern situations where three or more players on the same team must serve penalties simultaneously. They are designed to ensure a team can always have at least three skaters on the ice whilst also ensuring all penalties are fully "served" (assuming the game does not end first). In the simplest example, if Andy is assessed a minor penalty, followed by Barry, and both are still in the penalty box when Charlie also receives a minor penalty:

- Charlie may be substituted prior to play resuming;
- The two minutes Charlie must serve do not commence until Andy's penalty expires or team on the power play scores, whichever comes first;
- If the team on the power play scores prior to Andy's penalty expiring but before Barry's, Andy's penalty ends and he may leave the penalty box, but his team must still play two men short until Barry's penalty expires;
- If the team on the power play does not score prior to Andy's penalty expiring, Andy must remain in the penalty box until Barry's penalty expires or there is a stoppage in play, whichever comes first;
- Provided there is no stoppage in play, Andy will leave the penalty box when Barry's penalty expires, Barry will leave the penalty box when Charlie's penalty expires (putting their team back at full strength) and Charlie will remain in the penalty box until the next stoppage in play.

A goal scored by the short-handed team during a power play is called a short-handed goal; However, a short-handed goal does not affect the power play, as the short-handed team must still serve the duration of the minor penalty. If a power play ends without a goal against the shorthanded team, it is said to have killed the penalty. If a team scores on the power play, it is said to have converted the power play (that is, converted the opportunity into a goal).

During a power play, the shorthanded team may launch the puck to the opposite end of the rink, and play will continue; icing is not called. The only exception is in U.S. youth hockey (14-and-under), in which icing is enforced at all times.

In leagues that conduct overtime with fewer than five skaters per side, the concept of the power play still exists, but its application is slightly modified. For example, the NHL uses a three-on-three format for overtime in the regular season, with three skaters plus the goaltender. If regulation play ends with a team on the power play, the advantaged team starts overtime with more than three skaters (almost always four, very rarely five). Similarly, if a player is penalized during overtime, the non-penalized team is allowed to play with an extra skater for the duration of the penalty, and with two extra skaters if two players on the same team are serving penalties.

=== Futsal ===
In Futsal, a team may choose to intentionally legally power play by substituting their goalkeeper and replacing them with an outfield player. This gives the team numerical advantage at the cost of defensive stability. A team usually uses this strategy during the last minutes of the game to secure a late equalizer or victory.

=== Lacrosse ===
In box lacrosse, a power play is very similar to ice hockey, with two-minute minor penalties and five-minute majors. In field lacrosse, a similar type of penalty situation exists, though the duration of the penalty is only 30 seconds for technical fouls, one minute or more for personal fouls, and up to three minutes for use of an illegal stick, unsportsmanlike conduct and certain violent contact fouls such as targeting. Depending on the infraction, the penalty may "release" early if a goal is scored by the other team, or may be "non-releasable", meaning the full duration must be served. The term "power play" is not used in field lacrosse, but called "extra man offense" (EMO) or "man up" for the team fouled and "man down" for the offending team.

=== Muggle quidditch ===
In quidditch, a power play occurs when a member of the opposing team is given a blue, yellow, or red card. A player serving time for a blue card or yellow card must remain in the penalty box for one minute or until the other team scores. If a player is assessed a red card, that player is ejected from the game and a substitute must remain in the penalty box for two minutes. This two minutes must be served in full, regardless of how many times the opposing team scores during the penalty. A player receiving a second yellow card in the same game is automatically assessed a red card. Blue cards do not stack; a player may be assessed any number of blue cards without being automatically assessed a more severe card.

A team can never have a keeper in the penalty box. If the keeper is sent to the penalty box, the penalized keeper must immediately switch positions with a chaser teammate. If all chasers are already in the penalty box, the penalized keeper must switch with a beater or seeker teammate. If the keeper's penalty results in that team having all of its players in play serving time in the penalty box, that team forfeits the game.

=== Analogous concepts not generally referred to as a power play ===
- In water polo, a shorter version of the ice hockey or lacrosse penalty situation exists as well. It is referred to as "man up" or "man down".
- In futsal, there exists a situation which is essentially a power play. When a player is shown a red card and is thus ejected from the game, the penalized team must play short-handed for two minutes, similar to ice hockey. If a goal is scored, the team returns to full strength.
- In other forms of indoor soccer, usually played in the United States, there also exists a power play situation similar to ice hockey.
- In indoor American football, the 1988 proposed World Indoor Football League had intended to establish a perpetual power play, in which the offense would always have one man more on the field than the defense. Fan Controlled Football added the power play (explicitly identified as such) as one of its power-ups, a special one-play rule change that each team can exercise each half.
- In rugby union and rugby league, a player who is shown a yellow card is ruled off the field of play for a period of ten minutes (two minutes in the seven-a-side variation). The player may not be replaced, their team must play one player short while they are off the field. The temporary sending-off is usually called a sin binning.
- In association football, a player who is shown a red card (whether or not it is a straight red or a second yellow) is ejected and may not be replaced to the remainder of the game; the team must play with one fewer player.

== Other uses of power play ==
=== Netball ===
Several variant formats of netball introduce the concept of a power play, a designated quarter where all goals scored by a team are worth twice as normal:

- In the original fastnet format, when a team uses it in a quarter, all goals scored by that team are worth twice as normal. This means that if a shooter (Goal Shooter or Goal Attack) scores a goal outside the goal circle, the goal is worth four goals instead of two. It is also possible for both teams to use their power play in the same quarter.
- In the current fast5 format, when a team uses it in a quarter, all goals scored by that team are worth twice as normal. A shooter that scores a goal within 3.5 meters (11 ft) from the goal post scores two points instead of one. Four points (instead of two) if the goal was scored at least 3.5 meters (11 ft) away from the goal post but within the goal circle. If the goal was scored from outside of the goal circle (known as a super goal), six points is scored instead of three. The winner of the coin toss chooses which quarter to have this power play and the other team must choose a different quarter for their power play. This prevents both teams from having their power plays in the same quarter.

=== Cricket ===
A powerplay is a feature introduced into One Day International (ODI) cricket in 1991 (and subsequently into Twenty20 and 100-ball cricket) concerning fielding restrictions. In a powerplay, restrictions are applied on the fielding team, with only two fielders allowed outside the 30-yard circle for a set number of overs. It is intended to add to the excitement by encouraging more aggressive batting. Prior to 2015, the batting team could declare a powerplay at a time of their choice during the innings, but as of 2015, the powerplay now occurs at set times, with an ODI innings now comprising three powerplays with varying levels of restrictions.

=== Power snooker ===
In power snooker, this arises when a player pots the power ball. This triggers a period of time whereby all points scored are doubled.

=== Roller derby ===
Commonly known as a power jam, a power play occurs in roller derby when a team's designated scoring skater (jammer) is serving a penalty.

=== Curling ===
In the mixed doubles version of curling, a rule called a power play was introduced in the 2016–17 season. Each team can exercise the power play in one end per game, only when they have the hammer (throwing the last rock in an end). Instead of positioning the rock in the house on the center line, it is placed to a position straddling the edge of the eight-foot circle, with the back edge of the stone touching the tee line. The opponent's guard stone is placed in line with the stone in the house and the hack. The power play cannot be used in an extra end.

== See also ==
- Short-handed (another sports term)
- Sports strategy
