= Troy Stoudermire =

American gridiron football player (born 1990)

No. 15, 1, 17, 11
- Positions: Defensive back, kick returner, wide receiver

Personal information
- Born: July 1, 1990 (age 36); Dallas, Texas, U.S.
- Listed height: 5 ft 10 in (1.78 m)
- Listed weight: 199 lb (90 kg)

Career information
- High school: Skyline (Dallas, Texas)
- College: Minnesota (2008–2012)
- NFL draft: 2013: undrafted

Career history
- 2013: Cincinnati Bengals*
- 2013: Saskatchewan Roughriders*
- 2014–2015: Winnipeg Blue Bombers
- 2016: Minnesota Vikings*
- 2016: Edmonton Eskimos
- 2018: Calgary Stampeders
- 2019: Ottawa Redblacks
- 2021: Caudillos de Chihuahua
- * Offseason or practice squad member only

Awards and highlights
- Grey Cup champion (2018); FBS all-time kickoff return yards leader (3,615)

Career CFL statistics
- Defensive tackles: 15
- Special teams tackles: 10
- Interceptions: 1
- Return yards: 3,419
- Receptions: 9
- Stats at CFL.ca

Troy Stoudermire (born July 1, 1990) is an American former professional football defensive back, return specialist, and wide receiver. He is the all-time FBS leader in kickoff return yards. He played college football at Minnesota. Stoudermire was a member of the Cincinnati Bengals, Saskatchewan Roughriders, Winnipeg Blue Bombers, Minnesota Vikings, Edmonton Eskimos, Calgary Stampeders, and Ottawa Redblacks.

== Early life ==
Stoudermire played high school football at Skyline High School in Dallas, Texas. He rushed for 1,153 yards and 10 touchdowns on 150 carries, with 7.7 yards per carry, his senior year in 2007. He also recorded 19 receptions for 268 yards and three touchdowns, passed for 514 yards and a four scores and returned three punts for touchdowns. Stoudermire attended Seagoville High School his junior year, rushing for 2,135 yards and scoring 26 total touchdowns.

== College career ==
Stoudermire played for the Minnesota Golden Gophers from 2008 to 2012, spending time at both defensive back and wide receiver. He was medically redshirted in 2011. He finished his college career as FBS football's all-time leader in both kickoff returns (144) and kickoff return yards (3,615) yet never returned one for a touchdown. Stoudermire also recorded career totals of 112 solo tackles, 37 assisted tackles, three interceptions, six pass breakups, two forced fumbles, two fumble recoveries, and 35 receptions for 433 yards and three touchdowns.

== Professional career ==
Pre-draft measurables
Height	Weight	40-yard dash	10-yard split	20-yard split	20-yard shuttle	Three-cone drill	Vertical jump	Broad jump	Bench press
5 ft 10 in (1.78 m)	199 lb (90 kg)	4.52 s	1.55 s	2.65 s	4.19 s	6.99 s	35 in (0.89 m)	10 ft 0 in (3.05 m)	19 reps
All values from Pro Day

Stoudermire was signed by the Cincinnati Bengals on April 30, 2013, after going undrafted in the 2013 NFL draft. He was released by the Bengals on August 18, 2013.

Stoudermire was signed to the Saskatchewan Roughriders' practice roster on October 8, 2013. He was released by the Roughriders on June 21, 2014.

Stoudermire was signed by the Winnipeg Blue Bombers on June 29, 2014. He was named Special Teams Player of the Week for week ten of the 2014 CFL season after returning a punt 64 yards for his first CFL touchdown. Stoudermire played for two seasons in Winnipeg, scoring two return touchdowns, as well as catching 8 passes for 40 yards.

Stoudermire was signed by the Minnesota Vikings on May 9, 2016, as a wide receiver. He was released on August 30, 2016.

Stoudermire was signed to the Edmonton Eskimos' practice roster on September 13, 2016. Although he was brought up to the active roster to provide more explosiveness than regular returner Kenzel Doe, Stoudermire had fumbling issues, and after 4 games ended up on the injured list. Stoudermire also caught one pass for 6 yards. He would spend 2017 out of football.

Stoudermire was signed by the Calgary Stampeders on March 19, 2018. Injuries limited Stoudermire to 9 games, where he recorded 9 tackles and 6 special teams tackles, all career highs. However, as a returner, his usage and effectiveness saw a steep decline, putting up only 212 total yards. The Stampeders did go on to win the 106th Grey Cup at the end of the season.

Stoudermire signed with the Ottawa Redblacks on the second day of free agency. After spending a stint on the 6 game injured list, Stoudermire was released without playing a regular season game for the Redblacks.

He signed with the Caudillos de Chihuahua of the Fútbol Americano de México ahead of the 2021 season.
