= World Indoor Football League (1988) =

The World Indoor Football League was an indoor football league that was to begin in 1988 to compete with the Arena Football League, which was playing its second season in 1988. Some of the teams in the league ran into financial trouble before their season was to begin, and thus the league never came to fruition.

Like the Arena Football League, the WIFL was to use rebound nets (the AFL's since-expired patent on them had not yet taken effect), but only to prevent losing balls: any ball that made contact with the nets would be declared dead, similar to a rule instituted by the National Hockey League over a decade later. The WIFL also encouraged high offense, but in a different way: instead of restricting the motion of defensive players as the AFL did (and still does), the WIFL proposed using a permanent version of the power play by placing eight players on offense and only seven on defense, creating an 8-on-7 advantage for the offensive team.

The WIFL planned a 10-game schedule in the summer months, followed by a championship which would revive the name of the World Bowl (last used in 1974 by the outdoor World Football League). Players would be paid US$500 per game (a relatively high sum) or a third of ticket revenue, whichever was greater. The league also had a television contract with FNN-SCORE.

Eleven days prior to the WIFL's debut, however, Baltimore and San Antonio folded, and Indiana followed suit. Not desiring to move forward with only three teams in the league, the remaining franchises instead sought to join the AFL to begin play in 1989. When the AFL reportedly set the expansion fee in the seven-figure range (allegedly to purposefully discourage the WIFL teams from joining), the three teams could not meet those demands and folded. The AFL would not have another competing indoor league until 1998.

== The proposed 1988 WIFL lineup ==
Team	Metro area	Arena	Owner	Head coach
Eastern Conference
Baltimore War Eagles (called Baltimore Pride in local papers)	Baltimore	Baltimore Civic Arena		Mike Williams
Indiana Cougars	Indianapolis	Market Square Arena	John Mellencamp	
St. Louis Lightning	St. Louis	St. Louis Arena	Stump Mitchell	Mouse Davis
Western Conference
Las Vegas Aces	Las Vegas	Thomas & Mack Center		Guy Benjamin
San Antonio Texicans	San Antonio			
San Diego Thunder	San Diego	San Diego Sports Arena		Don Matthews
