= Estadio Panamericano de Hockey =

Field hockey stadium in Guadalajara

- Location: Guadalajara, Jalisco
- Capacity: 1,870

Construction
- Opened: May 12, 2010

Tenants
- 2011 Pan American Games, Tequileros de Jalisco

The Pan American Hockey Stadium is a field hockey stadium located in Guadalajara, Jalisco. It was officially opened by Mexican President Felipe Calderón on May 12, 2010. It has a capacity of 1,870 spectators, and hosted the field hockey competition at the 2011 Pan American Games. It is only the second, and by far the most modern, field hockey stadium built in the state of Jalisco despite the fact that 50% of the Mexican National field hockey team comes from the state. The facility also includes dedicated change rooms, massage, medical and rehabilitation facilities and will become a sports academy after the games.

== See also ==
- Field hockey at the 2011 Pan American Games
