= Eight-man football defensive formations =

Defensive formations in American football

There are several defensive formations commonly used in eight-man football. Defensive formations are classified by the total number of linemen and linebackers in the formation. The three basic types of formations in eight-man football are seven-man fronts, six-man fronts and five-man fronts.

As in 11-man football, formations are described in a (number of defensive linemen)-(number of linebackers)-(number of defensive backs) format.

== Seven-man fronts ==
Seven-man fronts are primarily used either against teams that pose no threat with the passing game or in short-yardage running situations. Even though linebackers have increased pass coverage duties, the emphasis is still on stopping the run.

=== 3-4-1 ===
Consists of either three down linemen or one down lineman and two up lineman, four linebackers and one safety. Linebackers have all pass coverage responsibilities with the safety playing deep cover. When three down lineman are used, outside linebackers have contain responsibilities plus their pass coverage.

=== 4-3-1 ===
The line consists of two tackles and two ends. Tackles line up anywhere between heads up on the offensive guards to the shoulders of the center. Responsible for run stop through the middle of the line. Ends line up in an up position on the outside shoulder of the widest offensive lineman. Acts as the "contain" man.

There are two outside linebackers and one middle linebacker. The middle linebacker lines up between the tackles off the line of scrimmage; this player stops the run up the middle of the formation and has pass coverage on running backs. Outside linebackers line up between the tackles and ends off the line of scrimmage, stopping the runs through the gap between the offensive guard and offensive end (the "B gap") and has pass coverage on the tight or split ends. The lone defensive back plays a deep zone in pass coverage.

=== 5-2-1 ===
This defense consists of three down linemen, two up linemen, two linebackers and one safety; usually a goal-line defense.

== Six-man fronts ==
Six-man fronts are usually the most balanced between run stop and pass coverage.

=== 4-2-2 ===
The 4-2-2 defense consists of two tackles, two ends, two linebackers, and two defensive backs. This defense is generally considered to be a balance between run and pass defense.

The line consists of two tackles and two ends. The tackles line up usually somewhere between directly opposite the offensive guards and the center; rarely will they be outside the guards. Their job is to control their assigned gaps on run plays and pressure the quarterback on passes. The ends line up on the outside shoulder of the widest offensive lineman; their main responsibility is to turn running plays back inside to the linebackers and defensive backs (in order to contain the run). They occasionally have pass coverage responsibilities and depending on personnel and scheme, may cover split ends and slot receivers. Some teams designate their best contain man to always play the wide side of the field.

The linebackers' main role is run support; they line up anywhere between the defensive ends. They can be stacked on the tackles or offset either inside or outside, depending on the tackles' alignment. Pass coverage responsibilities are for running backs coming out of the backfield, running backs in the slot formation, or, in some situations, tight ends. The defensive backs' first concern is to watch for the pass; they are responsible for the ends. They may cover a running back in the slotback position, leaving the tight end for the linebacker. In run plays, they act as a second set of linebackers.

=== 3-3-2 ===
The 3-3-2 formation consists of three linemen, three linebackers and two defensive backs. It is one of the most flexible formations, allowing multiple looks and blitz packages and freeing the middle linebacker from most pass coverage responsibilities; this way, the middle linebacker can be used for stopping the run.

The linemen are run stoppers and pass rushers. The nose tackle lines up at any point in between the inside shoulders of the offensive guards. Responsible for stopping running plays through the middle of the line. The player either stands up the center or shoots an A-gap. The defensive ends line up in a down position between the outside shoulder to heads up on the tight end, or in an up position on the outside shoulder of the tight end. In the down position has run stop in the "B gap". In the up position is the contain man.

Linebackers are primarily run stoppers and after that have pass coverage. The middle linebacker lines up in between the offensive guards. This player's main job is to stop the run; to be most effective, the middle linebacker should be the team's best tackler and be able to play from sideline to sideline. Pass coverage is a short zone on any backs coming through the middle of the line. When blitzing, the middle linebacker takes the "A gap" opposite of the nose tackle, becoming a de facto fourth lineman. The outside linebackers line up behind the defensive ends. They have pass coverage on running backs coming out of the backfield to the flats, can cover slotbacks but may switch with defensive backs. Defensive backs look for the pass first and then the run. They have coverage responsibilities for tight and split ends, but may cover slotbacks and leave tight ends for the outside linebackers.

=== 5-1-2 ===
This formation consists of three down linemen, two up linemen, one linebacker, and two defensive backs.

== Five-man fronts ==
Five-man fronts are used in passing situations or against a poor running team.

=== 3-2-3 ===
This formation consists of one down lineman, two up linemen, two linebackers, and three defensive backs. This formation is also known as 3-2-Monster, the monster being a safety and two cornerbacks in a man coverage. The 3-2-Monster is the mandated defensive formation in arena football and the base formation in most leagues of professional indoor football.

=== 4-1-3 ===
This formation consists of two down linemen, two up linemen, one linebacker, three defensive backs.

=== 2-3-3 ===
This formation consists of two down linemen, three linebackers, and three defensive backs. A better option to defend spread passing teams.

== See also ==
- Glossary of American football
- Formation (American football)
