= Tampa Tornadoes =

Indoor American football team

Logo

General information
- Founded: 2017
- Headquartered: Leto High School in Tampa, Florida
- Colors: red, light grey, icetine
- https://tbtornadoes.com/

Personnel
- Owners: Alton Walker; David J. Daniels, Jr. Luther Lee; Marcus Dupree
- General manager: David J. Daniels, Jr.
- Head coach: D.J. Daniels
- President: Alton Walker

Team history
- Tampa Bay Tornadoes (2020–2021); Tampa Bay Cyclones (2022); Capital City Cyclones (2023); Tampa Tornadoes (2025–present)

Home fields
- RP Funding Center (2021–2022); Traveling Team (2022–2024); Leto High School (2025–present)

League / conference affiliations
- American Arena League (2020–2021); South Division (2020); East Division (2021); American Indoor Football Alliance (2022–2023); International Football Alliance (2025–present)

The Tampa Tornadoes are a professional American football team based in Tampa, Florida.

The team was founded in 2017 as the indoor football team the Tampa Bay Tornadoes and later joined American Arena League (AAL) for the 2020 season, but did not play due to the onset of the COVID-19 pandemic. The team was announced to have joined the National Arena League for the 2021 season; however, the team was terminated from the league after failing to provide letters of credit. Following the dismissal from the National Arena League, the team rejoined the AAL and began play in 2021 as a member of the East division, but did not finish the season. They then left the AAL for a newly formed league called the American Indoor Football Alliance for the 2022 season. The team succeeded the region's previous arena football team, the Tampa Bay Storm, that ceased operations in 2017.

The team "relocated" to Tallahassee after the 2022 season as the Capital City Cyclones, but played as a traveling team from that point until 2024 when they became an 11-man developmental team and rebranded as the Tampa Tornadoes, briefly joining the International Football Alliance but withdrawing along with most of the other IFA's teams prior to the launch of the season.

== History ==
Tampa Bay Tornados (2020–2021)

Following the dissolvement of the Tampa Bay Storm in 2017, after playing for thirty years and being the only remaining charter member from the Arena Football League's inaugural season, the Tampa Bay Tornado advertised themselves as the successor to the former team. In 2019, the Tornadoes were an expansion team in the South Division of the American Arena League (AAL) for the 2020 season with Arena Football Hall of Famer and former Storm player Stevie Thomas serving as the team's first head coach and home games at Expo Hall in Tampa, Florida. The 2020 season was then cancelled due to the COVID-19 pandemic.

=== Tampa Bay Tornadoes/Cyclones (2020–2022) ===
In July 2020, they were approved to join the National Arena League (NAL) for the 2021 season, where they were to play against former Tampa Bay Storm rivals, Jacksonville Sharks and a relaunched Orlando Predators. The team was terminated from the NAL after not providing letters of credit, although the Tornadoes had notified the league about their intentions to withdraw and rejoin the AAL. Shortly after, the team rejoined the AAL for the 2021 season, but were instead playing home games in Lakeland, Florida, at the RP Funding Center. The team did not finish the 2021 season and have since joined the American Indoor Football Alliance (AIFA), along with other former AAL teams. The team appears to have been rebranded as the Tampa Bay Cyclones prior to the 2022 season.

=== Capital City Cyclones (2023) ===
On October 20, 2022, the Cyclones and the AIFA announced their intentions to relocate to Tallahassee, Florida. The team subsequently rebranded as the Capital City Cyclones, but played no home games in the 2023 season.

=== Tampa Bay Tornadoes (2025) ===
On August 26, 2023, Jeffery Singletary, speaking on behalf of Cyclones owner Alton Walker, announced that the Cyclones would be joining the Arena Football League. The AFL had announced a team from Tallahassee in July. The Cyclones wouldn't join the AFL, but instead was announced as one of the inaugural teams in the International Football Alliance (an outdoor developmental league) as the Tampa Bay Tornadoes. The Tornadoes withdrew from the IFA shortly before the 2025 season and will play that season as an independent team.

On June 22, 2025, hours before the Tornadoes were scheduled to play a game that evening, one of the team's investors withdrew his funding from the team and the team announced it would not play any further games in the 2025 season. Podcaster Mike Lathrop captured a screenshot of an earlier version of the announcement, one that the Tornadoes had deleted, that the team would be making another effort to join the Arena Football League's successor, Arena Football One.

The Tornadoes were not included in the AF1 schedule for 2026.

Capital City Cyclones (2023)

== Statistics and records ==
=== Season-by-season results ===
League champions	Conference champions	Division champions	Playoff berth	League leader

Season	League	Division	Regular season				Postseason results
Season	League	Division	Finish	Wins	Losses	Ties	Postseason results
2020	AAL	South	Season cancelled due to the COVID-19 pandemic.				
2021	AAL	East	DNF	3	1	0	
2022	AIFA		???	?	?	0	
2023	AIFA		???	?	?	0	
2024	IFA	IFA season pushed to 2025.					
2025	IFA			0	0	0	

=== Head coach records ===
Note: Statistics are correct through week six of the 2021 AAL season.

Name	Term	Regular season				Playoffs		Awards
Name	Term	W	L	T	Win%	W	L	Awards
Stevie Thomas	2020–present	3	1	0	.800			

== 2021 season ==
2021 Tampa Bay Tornadoes season
- General manager: Alton Walker
- Head coach: Stevie Thomas
- Home stadium: RP Funding Center

Results
- Record: 3–1
- League place: Did not finish

The 2021 Tampa Bay Tornadoes season was the team's inaugural season. Prior to the season, the Tornadoes were originally scheduled to play at the St. Louis Bandits (March 27), Georgia Cobras (April 3), at the Spokane Shock (May 8), and Northern Arizona Wranglers (August 8); however, these games were not played during the course of the season. The Tornadoes withdrew from the rest of the season near the end of May.

=== Schedule ===
2021 Tampa Bay Tornadoes schedule
Week	Date	Opponent	Result	Record	Game site
1	March 13	Carolina Predators	W 48–20	1–0	RP Funding Center
2	March 21	Georgia-Lina Lions	W 45–21	2–0	RP Funding Center
3	April 10	Charlotte Thunder	L 46–9	2–1	RP Funding Center
4	~~April 17~~	~~at Mississippi Raiders~~	Cancelled		~~Forrest County Multipurpose Center~~
5	Bye				
6	May 2	Mississippi Raiders	W 49–34	3–1	RP Funding Center
7	~~May 15~~	~~Arlington Lonhorns~~	Cancelled		~~RP Funding Center~~
8	Bye				
9	~~May 29~~	~~at Charlotte Thunder~~	Cancelled		~~Bojangles Coliseum~~
10	~~June 5~~	~~Pennsylvania Union~~	Cancelled		~~RP Funding Center~~
