= Chihuahua Rebelión =

Mexican American football team

- Established: 19 August 2020; 5 years ago
- Based in: Chihuahua City, Chihuahua, Mexico
- Home field: Estadio Olímpico Universitario José Reyes Baeza
- League: International Football Alliance; 2024–

Personnel
- Head coach: Mauricio Balderrama
- Owner: Luis Orozco
- Website: www.raramurisprofootball.com

Chihuahua Rebelión are a professional American football team based in Ciudad Juárez, Chihuahua, Mexico. The Rebelión were to compete in the inaugural season of the International Football Alliance (IFA) in 2025.

== History ==
=== Fútbol Americano de México ===
The Rarámuris de Ciudad Juárez were originally announced on 19 August 2020 as an expansion team in Fútbol Americano de México (FAM), with César Chávez serving as team president. The Rarámuris replaced the Centauros de Ciudad Juárez, who played in the same city but announced its disappearance on the same day. The name of the team was chosen as a tribute to the Rarámuri, the indigenous group native to the state of Chihuahua. That December, the Rarámuris presented Aarón Silva as the team's head coach and revealed Estadio 20 de Noviembre to be their home stadium. They also inquired about playing their home games at the larger Estadio Carta Blanca.

The 2021 FAM season was ultimately canceled due to the COVID-19 pandemic, postponing the Rarámuris' debut. However, a new Ciudad Juárez team with different ownership, the Jefes de Ciudad Juárez, was presented as a replacement for the Rarámuris ahead of the 2022 FAM season. Minutes after the announcement, the Rarámuris published a statement claiming that the team was unable to reach an agreement with the league and they mutually agreed to terminate their relationship.

=== Liga de Fútbol Americano Profesional ===
On 21 May 2022, during halftime of Tazón México V, it was announced that the Rarámuris de Ciudad Juárez would be joining the Liga de Fútbol Americano Profesional (LFA) for the 2023 LFA season as its eighth team, hiring Mauricio Balderrama as their head coach. A press conference was held on 11 July to officially present the team and reveal that it would play its home games at the Estadio Olímpico Universitario José Reyes Baeza in Chihuahua City. The team held its first tryouts in October. However, on 4 November, team president Cuahutémoc Romero Bedolla announced that the Rarámuris would not be able to take part in the 2023 season.

=== International Football Alliance ===
On 15 May 2023, it was announced that the Rarámuris would be joining the International Football Alliance (IFA), an upstart binational football league with teams in both Mexico and the U.S., for its inaugural season in 2024. In August 2023, the Rarámuris rebranded as the Rebelión.t

The Rebelión released a statement on June 13, 2025 stating that it was withdrawing from the IFA "in accordance with other teams that had made the same determination," following the discovery of "multiple administrative, financial and ethical irregularities" in the IFA structure. The team announced it would resume play on July 12 as an independent team, rebranding as the Rebelión Tarahumara.

On July 14, twenty Rebelión players, mostly Americans but including one English player (two-way player Germain Brown), came forward stating that they had been stranded in Mexico due to the team's suspension (which was never lifted), and that ownership had stopped paying the team's bills due to a lack of revenue (only 200 paying customers came to Chihuahua to watch the team's first home game). In a meeting with the new team ownership on July 11, these players were told that additional investors were being recruited but that these investors were insisting on a relocation to Ciudad Juarez; the owners also stated that they were out of money and could not reimburse the players for any expenses, and thus the players would be released from their contracts.
