= Noel Mazzone =

American football player and coach (born 1957)

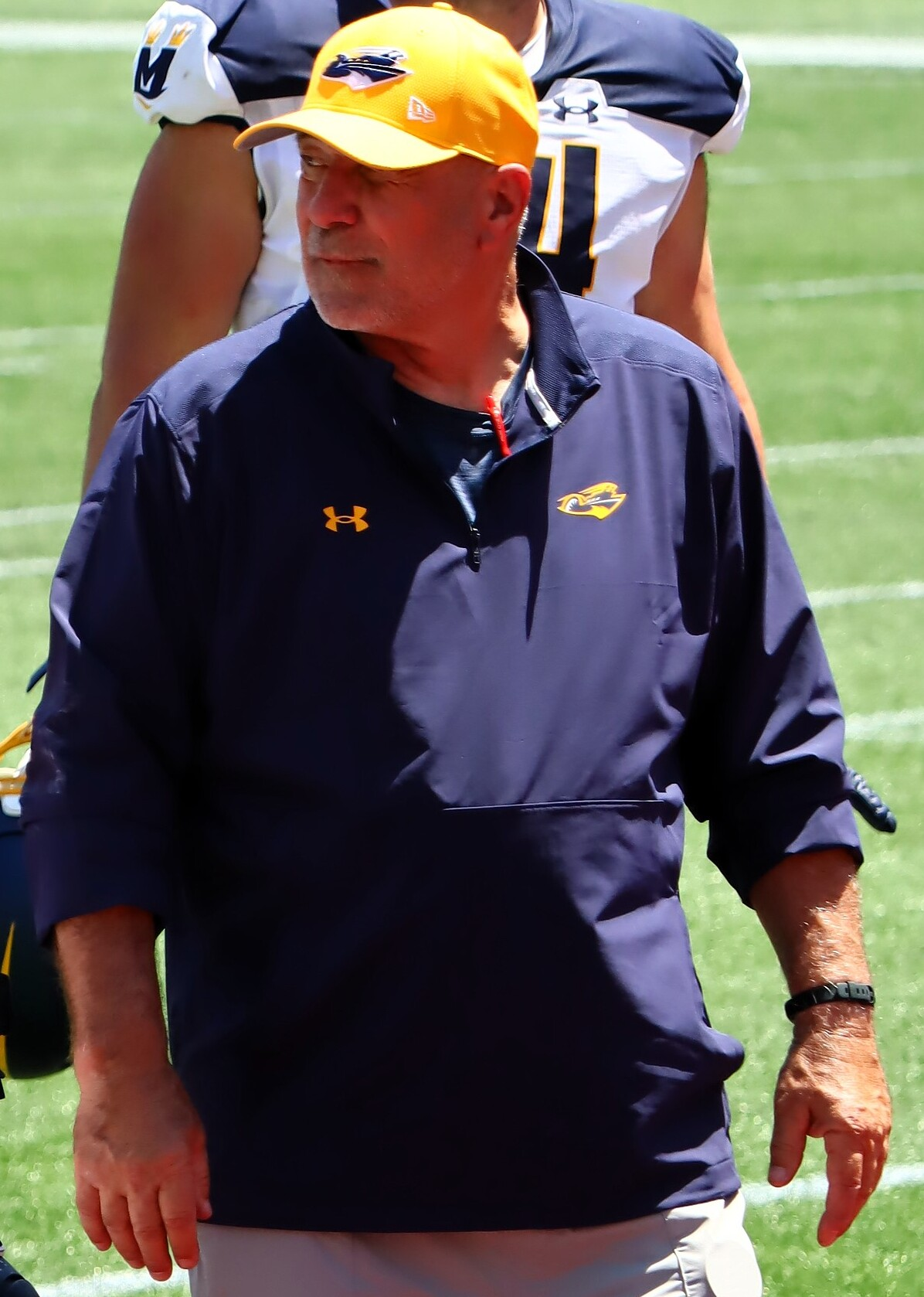
- Mazzone in 2025

Current position
- Title: Offensive coordinator
- Team: Dallas Renegades

Biographical details
- Born: March 21, 1957 (age 69); Mount Vernon, Washington, U.S.

Playing career
- 1975–1979: New Mexico
- Position: Quarterback

Coaching career (HC unless noted)
- 1980–1981: New Mexico (GA)
- 1982–1986: Colorado State (QB/WR)
- 1987–1991: TCU (QB)
- 1992–1994: Minnesota (QB)
- 1995–1998: Ole Miss (OC/QB)
- 1999–2001: Auburn (OC)
- 2002: Oregon State (OC)
- 2003–2004: NC State (OC/TE)
- 2005: Ole Miss (OC/QB)
- 2006–2008: New York Jets (WR)
- 2009: Panther Creek HS (NC) (OC)
- 2010–2011: Arizona State (OC)
- 2012–2015: UCLA (OC)
- 2016–2017: Texas A&M (OC/QB)
- 2018–2020: Arizona (OC/QB)
- 2021: UConn (OA)
- 2022: New Orleans Breakers (OC/QB)
- 2023: Pittsburgh Maulers (OC/QB)
- 2025: Memphis Showboats (OC/QB)
- 2025: UCLA (OA)
- 2026–present: Dallas Renegades (OC)

Noel Scott Mazzone (born March 21, 1957) is an American football coach and former player who is the offensive coordinator for the Dallas Renegades of the United Football League (UFL). He is the former offensive coordinator at the University of Arizona.

== Early life and playing career ==
Mazzone grew up in Raton, New Mexico and went on to play college football as a quarterback under coach Bill Mondt at the University of New Mexico from 1975 to 1979.

== Coaching career ==
After graduation, Mazzone started his coaching career as a graduate assistant at New Mexico under head coach Joe Morrison who had succeeded Mondt in 1980. Mazzone also spent one season (1981) at Boulder High School, coaching future University of Colorado greats Tom Gebhardt and Eric McCarty. In 1982, Mazzone received his first full-time position, coaching quarterbacks and receivers under Leon Fuller at Colorado State. After five years at CSU, Mazzone was hired away by Jim Wacker to serve as quarterbacks coach at TCU. When Wacker left TCU for the head coaching position at the University of Minnesota in 1992, Mazzone followed Wacker to serve the same position with the Gophers.

In 1995, Mazzone was hired as offensive coordinator by Tommy Tuberville, who had just become head coach at Ole Miss. Tuberville left Ole Miss for Auburn in 1999, taking Mazzone with him. However, after the 2001 season Tuberville chose to replace Mazzone with Bobby Petrino.

Oregon State head coach Dennis Erickson then hired Mazzone as offensive coordinator for the 2002 season.

When Erickson left the collegiate ranks to coach the San Francisco 49ers, Mazzone chose to remain in college football, becoming offensive coordinator under Chuck Amato at North Carolina State, where he coached Philip Rivers, who would be the fourth overall pick in the 2004 NFL draft.

In January 2005, Mazzone returned to Ole Miss to serve as offensive coordinator and quarterbacks coach under head coach Ed Orgeron. He was fired as offensive coordinator at the end of the 2005 season but remained an employee at Ole Miss for contractual reasons.

In 2006, Mazzone took his first position in the NFL when new head coach Eric Mangini hired him as wide receivers coach for the New York Jets. Mangini was fired by the Jets following the 2008 season and Mazzone's contract with the Jets was allowed to expire.

In January 2009, Mazzone was under consideration by Randy Shannon for the vacant position as offensive coordinator for the Miami Hurricanes, and in February of that year was under consideration by Dave Wannstedt as offensive coordinator for the University of Pittsburgh. He was also being considered for the job coaching quarterbacks under Mangini with the Cleveland Browns. But, instead of going to coach for any college he decided to assume the duties of offensive coordinator for Panther Creek High School in Cary, North Carolina under Wayne Bragg.

On January 4, 2010, he was hired as offensive coordinator at Arizona State University, where he was reunited with Dennis Erickson, who he previously worked under at Oregon State University.

In 2012, it was announced that Mazzone would be joining Jim L. Mora's coaching staff at UCLA as offensive coordinator.

On January 8, 2016, Mazzone left UCLA, and joined Kevin Sumlin's staff at Texas A&M as their offensive coordinator.

On January 14, 2018, it was announced that Mazzone left Texas A&M, and joined with his son Taylor and Kevin Sumlin's staff at Arizona as their offensive coordinator.

UConn director of athletics David Benedict announced on Wednesday September 15, 2021 that they have hired longtime offensive coach Noel Mazzone as an offensive analyst. His duties include “providing support to this interim head coach and offensive coordinator.”

Mazzone was hired to serve as the head coach of Team PDX in the International Football Alliance in 2024, but the team never materialized. Mazzone was quietly hired early in the 2025 UFL season to serve as offensive coordinator for the Memphis Showboats. He rejoined the UCLA Bruins football staff as a coaching analyst in October 2025, following a midseason coaching change, to assist first-time offensive coordinator Jerry Neuheisel.
