= Eric Marty =

American football player and coach

No. 12
- Position: Quarterback

Personal information
- Listed height: 6 ft 2 in (1.88 m)
- Listed weight: 210 lb (95 kg)

Career information
- High school: Meadowdale (Lynnwood, Washington)
- College: Chapman
- NFL draft: 2008: undrafted

Career history

Playing
- Bolzano Giants (2009); Danube Dragons (2010); Bologna Warriors (2011); Catania Elephants (2012)

Coaching
- Oklahoma Panhandle State (2012) Wide receivers coach; Moorpark (2013–2014) Offensive coordinator; East Los Angeles (2015) Head coach; Reedley (2016–2020) Head coach; Grambling State (2021) Offensive coordinator; Michigan Panthers (2022–2023) Offensive coordinator & Quarterbacks coach

Head coaching record
- Regular season: 25–23 (.521)
- Career: 27–25 (.519)

Eric Marty is an American football coach and former quarterback who was most recently the offensive coordinator and quarterbacks coach for the Michigan Panthers of the United Football League (UFL). He played professionally in the Austrian Football League and Italian Football League. Marty played college football at Chapman from 2005 to 2008.

== Football career ==
He played football and graduated from Chapman University, and NCAA Division III school. He still holds six school records including highest single game and season completion percentage, most career 300 yard passing games, and longest completion for a touchdown.

=== Professional career ===
After playing his final college season in 2008, Marty was signed by the Bolzano Giants of the Italian Football League. The team finished the regular season in first and place and defeated the Lazio Marines in the 2009 Italian Super Bowl to win the Giant's first ever IFL Championship.

Marty signed the following season in 2010 signed to play for the Danube Dragons of the Austrian Football League AFL. The team finished the AFL regular season in first place and defeated the Tirol Raiders in the Austrian Bowl. Marty was named the MVP of the game as Danube won its first AFL championship.

In 2011, Marty signed with the Bologna Warriors of the Italian Football League as quarterback and offensive coordinator. The team finished the regular season undefeated but eventually lost to the Parma Panthers in the Italian Super Bowl marking the first season Marty did not win the championship.

In 2012 Marty signed with the Catania Elephants. Once again his team finished the regular season in first place. Marty again lost in the Italian Super Bowl to the Parma Panthers.

== Coaching career ==
=== Oklahoma Panhandle State ===
Marty retired from international play to take a full-time coaching position at Oklahoma Panhandle State University as their wide receivers coach in Fall of 2012.

=== Moorpark College ===
After the season in March 2013 Marty accepted the offensive coordinator at position at Moorpark College. Marty's 2014 unit was ranked 14th in the state in total offense.

=== East Los Angeles College ===
In January 2015 Marty was offered and accepted the head football coaching position at East Los Angeles College, but left after one season.

=== Reedley College ===
He then accepted the head coaching position at Reedley College, a junior college located in central California. Marty inherited a program on a two-year probation (recruiting limitations and a bowl ban) as mandated by the CCCAA. The program only had 10 players. Marty was able to steadily rebuild the program, going 1-9 and 4-6 on those two seasons while still on probation. In 2018, Marty's first year off of probation, Reedley went 10-0 in the regular season, won the Golden Coast Conference and was invited to play in the NCFC American Division Championship game. The Tigers fell on a last minute touchdown in the bowl game, losing 42-41 to De Anza College.

Marty was named 2018 Golden Coast Conference Coach of the Year. Additionally the Tigers had 10 first team all conference selections and the Golden Coast Conference Offensive Player of the Year in QB Randall Johnson.

=== Grambling State ===
In 2021 Marty was hired as offensive coordinator at Grambling State University.

=== Michigan Panthers ===
In 2022 he became the offensive coordinator for the Michigan Panthers of the United States Football League (USFL). On March 15, 2023, Marty was brought back as the offensive coordinator and quarterbacks coach for the Panthers for the 2023 season. On January 29, 2024, it was revealed that Marcel Bellefeuille would become the new offensive coordinator.

Marty was hired as head coach for the Baltimore Lightning, a professional football team that was seeking to join the International Football Alliance, for the 2025 season. The Lightning acrimoniously split from the IFA prior to the start of the season.

As of December 2024, Marty is a coaching assistant and professor at the College of the Sequoias.

== Head coaching record ==
| Year | Team | Overall | Conference | Standing | Bowl/playoffs |
|---|---|---|---|---|---|
East Los Angeles Huskies (American Mountain League) (2015)
| 2015 | East Los Angeles | 2–8 | 1–6 | T–6th | |
| East Los Angeles: | | 2–8 | 1–6 | | |
Reedley Tigers (American Golden Coast League) (2016–2020)
| 2016 | Reedley | 1–9 | 1–5 | T–5th | |
| 2017 | Reedley | 4–6 | 2–4 | 5th | |
| 2018 | Reedley | 10–1 | 6–0 | 1st | |
| 2019 | Reedley | 10–1 | 6–0 | 1st | |
| 2020–21 | No team—COVID-19 | | | | |
| Reedley: | | 25–17 | 15–9 | | |
| Total: | | 27–25 | | | |
National championship Conference title Conference division title or championship game berth
