= Stevie Thomas =

American football player and coach (born 1967)

No. 20
- Position: Wide receiver / Linebacker

Personal information
- Born: July 24, 1967 (age 59)
- Listed height: 6 ft 1 in (1.85 m)
- Listed weight: 210 lb (95 kg)

Career information
- College: Bethune-Cookman
- NFL draft: 1990: undrafted

Career history
- Tampa Bay Buccaneers (1990)*; Orlando Thunder (1991)*; Tampa Bay Storm (1991–1999); Orlando Predators (2000); New Jersey Gladiators (2001); As coach: Tampa Bay Tornadoes (2021–present) (HC)
- * Offseason or practice squad member only

Awards and highlights
- 5× ArenaBowl champion (1991, 1993, 1995, 1996, 2000); 2× ArenaBowl MVP (1991, 1996); First-team All-Arena (1992); Second-team All-Arena (1996); AFL Second Team 15th Anniversary Team (2001); AFL 20 Greatest Players - #9 (2006); Arena Football Hall of Fame inductee (2011); AFL 25 Greatest Players - #12 (2012)

Career AFL statistics
- Receptions: 529
- Receiving yards: 7,892
- Receiving TDs: 152
- Tackles: 111
- Interceptions: 10
- Stats at ArenaFan.com

Stevie Thomas (born July 24, 1967) is an American former professional football wide receiver/linebacker who played in the Arena Football League (AFL). He played college football at Bethune-Cookman University. He was an undrafted free agent of the Tampa Bay Buccaneers and earned NFL contract for the 1990 season. In 1991, he was 3rd round draft pick of the inaugural season of the World League of American Football (WLAF). Upon returning from the WLAF, he joined the Tampa Bay Storm of the AFL.

In 2011, Thomas was elected into the Arena Football Hall of Fame.

Since 2021, Thomas has been the head coach for the indoor football team the Tampa Bay Tornadoes.
