= Tunica Arena and Exposition Center =

Multi-purpose arena near Tunica, Mississippi

Coordinates: 34.725879°N 90.370638°W

The Tunica Arena and Exposition Center is a 6,000-seat multi-purpose arena near Tunica, Mississippi, USA. It was built in 2000.

The $25 million center is the largest indoor arena in Mississippi, with 48,000 square feet (4,500 m^{2}) of climate-controlled exhibition space on the main arena floor. It has a seating capacity of 6,000 and paved parking for 1,100 vehicles, plus 600 additional parking spaces and 66 RV spaces.

The facility has 14 luxury skyboxes, full-service banquet facilities, two outdoor arenas and an adjacent pavilion with an additional 100,000 square feet (10,000 m^{2}) of exposition area. Also, 366 livestock stalls, showers, dressing areas and support services provide one of the region's largest covered environments for livestock shows.

In 2025 Chazen Capital took over management of the arena.
