= Tequileros de Jalisco =

Mexican American football team

General information
- Founded: 2018; 8 years ago
- Stadium: Estadio Panamericano de Hockey
- Headquartered: Guadalajara, Jalisco, Mexico
- Colours: Chrome yellow and British racing green
- Website: tequileros.com.mx

Personnel
- Owners: Enrique Villanueva; Germán Pérez de Celis

League / conference affiliations
- Fútbol Americano de México; 2019–2022

The Tequileros de Jalisco (English: Jalisco Tequila Makers) are an American football team based in Guadalajara, Jalisco, Mexico. The Tequileros played two seasons in Fútbol Americano de México (FAM), which shut down operations in 2022. The team played its home games at the Estadio Panamericano de Hockey.

The team was announced as a member of the International Football Alliance (IFA) in 2023, but never played in the league.

== History ==
=== Fútbol Americano de México ===
The Tequileros de Jalisco was initially announced in late 2018 as one of the five charter members of Fútbol Americano de México (FAM), a professional American football league established as an alternative to the Liga de Fútbol Americano Profesional (LFA). The team was officially presented at a press conference on 19 February 2019 by team owners Enrique Villanueva and Germán Pérez de Celis, as well as head coach Francisco Vázquez, who aimed to provide professional opportunities to players from the three local college football programs. It was the first professional American football team to play in the state of Jalisco and was announced just hours after the presentation of the Astros de Jalisco, a professional basketball team.

==== 2019 season ====
The Tequileros' inaugural 45-man roster included 18 players from the Borregos Salvajes Guadalajara college team. The team played its first game on 24 February 2019, opening the season with a 22–19 defeat to the Bulldogs de Naucalpan at home at the Estadio Tres de Marzo. Christopher Reyes scored the first touchdown in franchise history. After losing to the Titanes de la Ciudad de México in week two, the Tequileros returned home in week three and defeated the Centauros de Ciudad Juárez by a score of 34–10 for the first victory in team history. David Poblete ran for 167 yards and one touchdown on 17 carries in the win.

The Tequileros suffered three consecutive losses before closing the season with back-to-back wins. First, they defeated the first-place Pioneros de Querétaro at home by a score of 15–6. The Tequileros finished the season with a 42–17 victory over the Bulldogs at the Estadio Redskins in Naucalpan. The team finished its debut season with a 3–5 record, though they missed the postseason on a tiebreaker.

==== 2020 and 2021 seasons ====
The Tequileros began the 2020 season with a 57–13 defeat to the Caudillos de Chihuahua. The following week, they beat the Centauros de Ciudad Juárez at home by a score of 55–18 for their first win of the season. In week four, the Tequileros shutout the Rojos de Lindavista 51–0 to secure a three-game winning streak. However, the 2020 FAM season was suspended on 14 March due to the COVID-19 pandemic. The 2021 season was ultimately cancelled as well.

==== 2022 season ====
In March 2022, the Tequileros de Jalisco announced that they would play their home games at the Estadio Panamericano de Hockey, which would be renovated to have a capacity of 6,000 spectators. The team won its season opener against the Rojos de la Ciudad de México by a score of 17–15, with Carlos Elizondo throwing two touchdowns to Jylil Reeder. The following week, the Tequileros defeated the Bulldogs de Naucalpan, 33–14, in their first game in their new stadium. The Tequileros finished the regular season with a 5–3 record, yet again missing the playoffs on a tiebreaker.

The FAM shut down league operations in September 2022 due to financial struggles. Some FAM teams joined the rival LFA, but the Tequileros were left without a league.

=== International Football Alliance ===
On 15 May 2023, it was announced that the Tequileros would be joining the International Football Alliance (IFA), a new binational football league with teams in both Mexico and the U.S., for its inaugural season in 2024.

== Season-by-season ==
Season	League	Head coach	Regular season				Postseason			
Season	League	Head coach	Won	Lost	Win %	Finish	Won	Lost	Win %	Result
2019	FAM	Francisco Vázquez	3	5	.375	5th	Did not qualify			
2022	FAM	Francisco Vázquez	5	3	.625	5th	Did not qualify			
Total			8	8	.500					
