= Arena football =

Variation of gridiron football

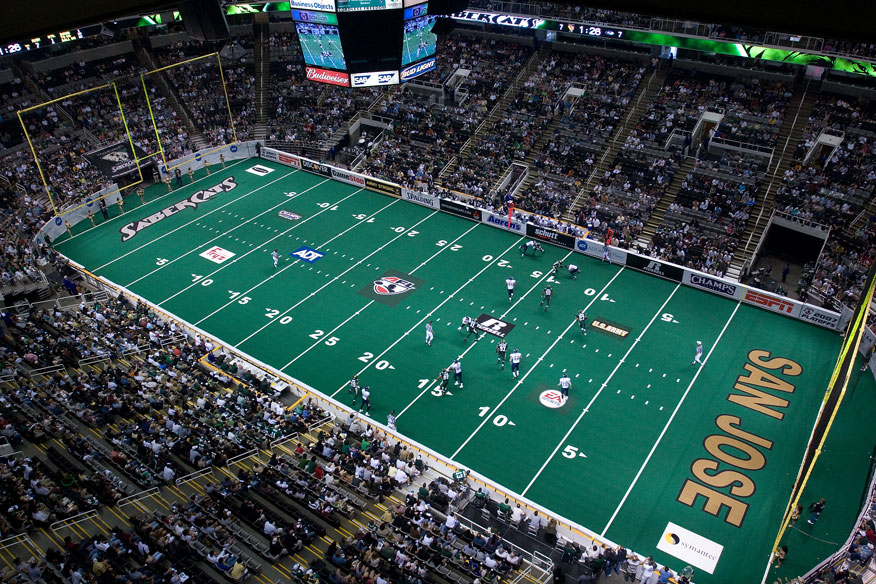
- San Jose SaberCats and Columbus Destroyers in ArenaBowl XXI, the 2007 championship game of the AFL
- Nicknames: Arena football, indoor football, football, gridiron football
- First played: 1980s

Characteristics
- Contact: Full
- Team members: 8 at a time
- Type: Indoor pro football

Arena football is a variety of gridiron football designed to be played indoors. The game is played on a smaller field than American or Canadian football, designed to fit in the same surface area as a standard North American ice hockey rink, and features between six and eight players for each team playing at any given time depending on the league, resulting in a faster and higher-scoring game that can be played on the floors of indoor arenas. The sport was invented in 1981, and patented in 1987, by Jim Foster, a former executive of the National Football League and the United States Football League. The name is trademarked by Gridiron Enterprises and had a proprietary format until its patent expired in 2007.

Three leagues have played under official arena football rules: the Arena Football League (AFL), which played 32 seasons in two separate runs from 1987 to 2008 and 2010 to 2019; arenafootball2, the AFL's developmental league, which played 10 seasons from 2000 through 2009; and the China Arena Football League, which played two abbreviated seasons in 2016 and 2019 but was not directly affiliated with the now-defunct AFL. A 2024 reboot of the Arena Football League used the original league's rulebook with minor variations.

Through the late 1990s, the Arena Football League was the only league playing any variant of the sport designed for indoor play. A clarification limiting the scope of its patent allowed for competing indoor football leagues (sometimes known as arena leagues) to use the same size field and most other aspects of the game. Arena football is distinguished from the other indoor leagues by its use of large rebound nets attached to the side of each goalpost, which keep any missed field goal or overthrown ball in the field of play and allow the ball to remain live; the rebound nets were the only part of the patent that was upheld until it expired. As a result, some non-AFL arena leagues that formed after the patent expired like the National Arena League have used rebound nets, although they no longer do. Other leagues such as the Indoor Football League and American Indoor Football opt to not use them. The newest league, Arena Football One, used the rebound nets as they began play in 2025.

== History ==
=== Early history ===
The first demonstration of football on a small field was actually played outdoors at the original open-air Madison Square Garden. Using nine-man sides, Pennsylvania defeated Rutgers 10–0 at the annual meeting of the Amateur Athletic Union on January 16, 1889. Two months later, on March 7, 1889, the first documented indoor football game was an exhibition between Pennsylvania and Riverton Club at the Philadelphia Academy of Music. Field dimensions for the 0–0 tie were no more than 200 feet long by 50 feet wide, and the exhibition was played at night under gas lamps.

Other early indoor games included two exhibitions at Madison Square Garden II in December 1890. Springfield YMCA Training School and a Yale Senior Class team played on December 12, 1890. James Naismith scored a touchdown for Springfield, though Yale won the exhibition 16–10. (Naismith's dissatisfaction with how football transferred to the indoor surface inspired him to develop the game of basketball a year later.) The following day a second exhibition game was played, with Pennsylvania defeating Rutgers 20–12. The field at Madison Square Garden measured 260 feet (79 m) long and 100 feet (30 m) wide. In an exhibition at Tattersall's Pavilion in Chicago on December 16, 1893, Chicago defeated Northwestern 20–14 on a field smaller than regulation.

The first documented indoor regulation football games were those played at the Chicago Coliseum in the late 1890s. The first such game matched Michigan against Chicago on Thanksgiving Day 1896. The match was "the first collegiate game of football played under a roof." Adding to the novelty, as daylight turned to darkness, the field inside the Coliseum was lit with electric lighting. With seven acres of floor space, the sprawling Coliseum is believed to have not needed any compromises to accommodate an American football field. According to a newspaper account, the field grew dark in the second half, and play was halted for ten minutes to discuss whether play should continue. Play was resumed, and the lights were finally turned on after Michigan scored a touchdown. The press proclaimed the experiment in indoor football to be a success:

One thing at least was settled by the game, and that is, that indoor football is literally and figuratively speaking a howling success. The men had no trouble in catching punts, and football was played on its merits, without the handicaps of a wet field or a strong wind. Toward the end of the second half it got very dark, and the spectators were treated to a novelty in the shape of football by electric light."

Although both critically and commercially successful, the Coliseum was destroyed in a fire less than two years after its opening. It hosted only four games, and its replacement could not accommodate an American football field.

Later, at Madison Square Garden in 1902 and 1903, there were games known as the "World Series of Pro Football." The games were played on a 70-yard by 35-yard dirt field but otherwise adhered to outdoor rules. Poor attendance led to the tournament being discontinued after two years.

The Chicago Bears of the National Football League hosted an experimental game against their crosstown rivals, the Cardinals, after the 1930 NFL season, at the indoor Chicago Stadium. Two years later, poor weather conditions led to the Bears hosting the 1932 NFL Playoff Game against the Portsmouth Spartans (now the Detroit Lions) at the stadium. A dirt and tanbark field measuring 80 yards long (60 yards plus two ten-yard end zones) and 45 yards wide was constructed on the arena's floor. The Chicago Stadium games were notable for introducing several rule changes, including the introduction of hash marks to keep play away from spectators who were seated next to the field (much like modern indoor football), while goal posts were moved to the goal line. To compensate for the smaller field, teams were "penalized" 20 yards upon crossing midfield. (The Bears' official Web site goes further and claims that field goals were outlawed for the 1932 game.)

In 1930, the Atlantic City Convention Center constructed a nearly full-size indoor football field, and used it for one to three games a year during the 1930s; the stadium stopped hosting games in 1940 and did not resume hosting football games until 1961. In the 1960s, the Boardwalk Bowl, a post-season game involving small college teams, was contested at the convention center. The Bowl was an attempt to make Atlantic City more of a year-round resort in the pre-gambling era as opposed to a single-season one (the Miss America Pageant, also held at the center, likewise began as an attempt to extend the season beyond Labor Day). The Atlantic Coast Football League played its inaugural championship game at the convention center in 1962, but the game only drew 2,000 fans and the game would thereafter move to the home stadium of the team with the best regular season record. The Philadelphia-based Liberty Bowl game, which had been played at Municipal Stadium from 1959 to 1963, was moved into the Convention Center in 1964 for the contest between Utah and West Virginia. The game drew just over 6,000 fans, though, and the Liberty Bowl moved to Memphis the next year, where it has remained. Unlike modern indoor football, the size of the playing surface and hence the rules were essentially the same as in the standard outdoor game, with rules updated to deal with contingencies for what could happen indoors, such as a punt striking the ceiling. The end zones were slightly shorter—eight yards instead of the standard ten (coincidentally, the eight-yard endzone length is the standard in modern indoor football).

=== Arena Football League ===
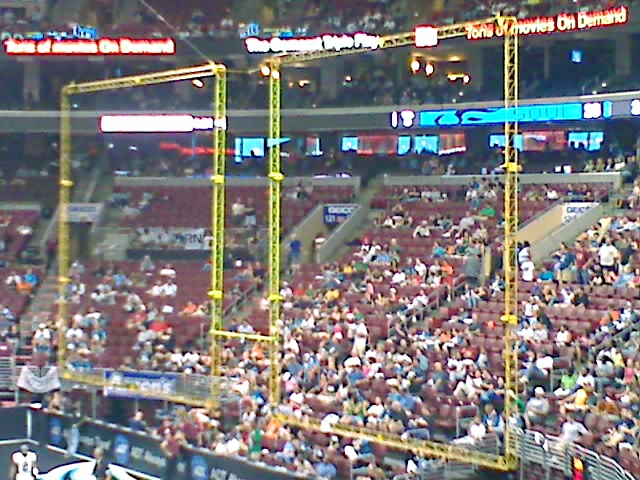
An arena football goalpost structure featuring the rebound nets on either side of the uprights.

While several attempts to create a true indoor football game have been made since shortly after American football was developed, the first version to meet with relatively widespread success and acceptance was devised by Jim Foster, a former executive of the United States Football League and the National Football League. He devised his game while watching indoor soccer, another game derived from a sport played outdoors. He worked on the game in the early 1980s, but put any plans for full development of it on hold while the United States Football League, an attempt to play traditional American football in a non-traditional (spring-summer) season, was in operation in 1983–1985. When the USFL ceased operations, Foster saw his opportunity. He staged a "test" game in Rockford, Illinois in 1986 and put together a four-team league for a "demonstration season" in the spring of 1987, with games televised on ESPN.

Foster had to adopt a field that would fit within the smaller playing surfaces found in most arenas and thus created a field that was identical in size to a standard North American ice hockey rink, 200 by 85 feet (61 m × 26 m). This resulted in the field being 50 yards long (half of the length of a standard American football field) with eight-yard end zones (which may, if necessary, be curved in the end zones as hockey rinks are), and the field being slightly over half as wide as a standard football field. Foster adopted short-pile artificial turfs (which were then standard) such as AstroTurf for the field because of its ability to be easily rolled up when the arena is being used for other sports.

Foster adopted a modified version of eight-man football. He also mandated a one-platoon system that required at least six players to play on both offensive and defensive downs. This had the added desirable effect of limiting team payrolls.

There were numerous other rules designed to help the offense and ensure high-scoring games:

- punting is banned; a team not likely to get a first down may only attempt a field goal.
- the placing of taut rebound nets at the ends of the playing surface alongside the goalposts. Kicked and passed balls bouncing off these nets remain in play. In the case of a pass, the ball is live only until it touches the ground, allowing for receptions and interceptions on the rebound. On an unsuccessful field goal attempt or kickoff, the ball remains in play unless it goes out of bounds or until the player recovering it is downed by contact or scores, so on kicking plays (except an extra point attempt) either team may attempt to gain possession of the ball and advance it, much as a blocked kick could be in the traditional outdoor game. Only kicked or passed balls touching the slack nets behind the goalposts are ruled dead at that point.

To further an offensive passing advantage over the defense, Foster also imposed strict restrictions on the defensive formation, mandating that all defenses were required to play a 3-2-Monster formation with three defensive linemen, two linebackers, two cornerbacks, and one safety. Linebackers were not permitted to blitz and were required to stay in boxes behind the line of scrimmage, while defensive linemen were hindered by restrictions that prevented them from using certain techniques to penetrate the offensive line. Quarterbacks and placekickers were exempt from the one-platoon system, allowing two key scoring positions to be more specialized. The AFL also adopted the USFL's concept of playing in the late spring and summer, since this is when most hockey and basketball arenas have the fewest schedule conflicts (only competing with touring stadium rock concerts). The spring schedule has since been adopted by virtually all other professional indoor leagues as of 2010.

Within a year of the AFL kicking off, its first challenger, the World Indoor Football League formed. The WIFL planned to play a schedule with six teams beginning in summer of 1988 with its own set of indoor-inspired rules, including an unusual system that would have eight men on offense and seven men on defense. Despite having backing from former NFL players, veteran coaches, and singer John Mellencamp, the league canceled its 1988 season, folded half of its franchises (including Mellencamp's), and made an unsuccessful bid for the remaining three teams to join the AFL; the WIFL never played a single game.

In 1990, Foster patented the rules of arena football, meaning that only persons authorized by him could use his rules and his name for the sport. While the AFL asserted throughout the 1990s that the patent covered virtually every aspect of the game (from the 50-yard field to the eight-man format), a 1998 lawsuit (Arena Football League v. Professional Indoor Football League) established that the patent specifically covered the rebound net feature, meaning that competitors could not use this aspect of the rules. However, under provisions of U.S. patent law, Foster's patent expired on March 27, 2007, enabling competitors to use rebound nets (at least as originally envisioned, without other innovations that he may have patented).

The AFL signed a major network television broadcasting contract with NBC, and eventually launched an official minor league, af2, beginning in 2000. This effort basically served two purposes: one as a developmental league for the AFL, and as a place where former collegiate players could develop while at the same time learning and becoming accustomed to the unique arena rules, and secondly as a pre-emptive way of shutting out potential new indoor football competitors (this was especially important as the 2007 expiration of Foster's patent on the rebound nets approached). At times over forty teams participated in this league, almost uniformly in cities which also had minor league ice hockey teams and hence suitable arenas.

Shortly before the end of 2008, the Arena Football League announced that it would not be playing a 2009 spring season. During the previous few years, the league administrators and team owners had allowed player salaries and other costs to rise to the point where the league and many of the teams were losing a substantial amount of money. Late in the summer of 2009, with the team owners unable to agree on a plan for making the league viable again the AFL announced that it was folding, eventually putting its assets up in a Chapter 7 bankruptcy liquidation.

The developmental af2, however, played its 2009 season as scheduled. Most of the teams made a sustainable profit and the team owners were eager to see the league continue for another year. However, with the AFL owning 50.1% of the af2, it would fold if the AFL folded. At the end of the 2009 season, a gathering of af2 and remaining AFL team owners set out to form their own organization, originally known as Arena Football 1 (AF1). AF1 went on to purchase all assets of the original AFL and af2, except for a few team names and logos owned by outside parties, in a December 2009 bankruptcy auction. Shortly after the purchase, AF1 adopted the Arena Football League name, and the AFL relaunched in 2010. The "iron man" rule, requiring at least six of the eight players to play on both offense and defense, was dropped, but most other past AFL rules remained unchanged. The relaunched league saw franchises return and renewed interest, but by the end of the 2017 season, almost all of the league's teams had either folded or moved to other leagues, with only the Philadelphia Soul having existed prior to 2016. Five expansion teams, all in the Mid-Atlantic United States, were established over the next two years, before the league announced after the 2019 season that it was dissolving in a second Chapter 7 bankruptcy.

However, on February 1, 2023, a new ownership group that had acquired the league's trademarks and social media accounts announced another revival of the league, which began play in 2024.

On May 12, 2024, kicker Melissa Strother made an extra point while playing for the Washington Wolfpack, making her the first female player to score a point in the league.

=== Other indoor leagues ===
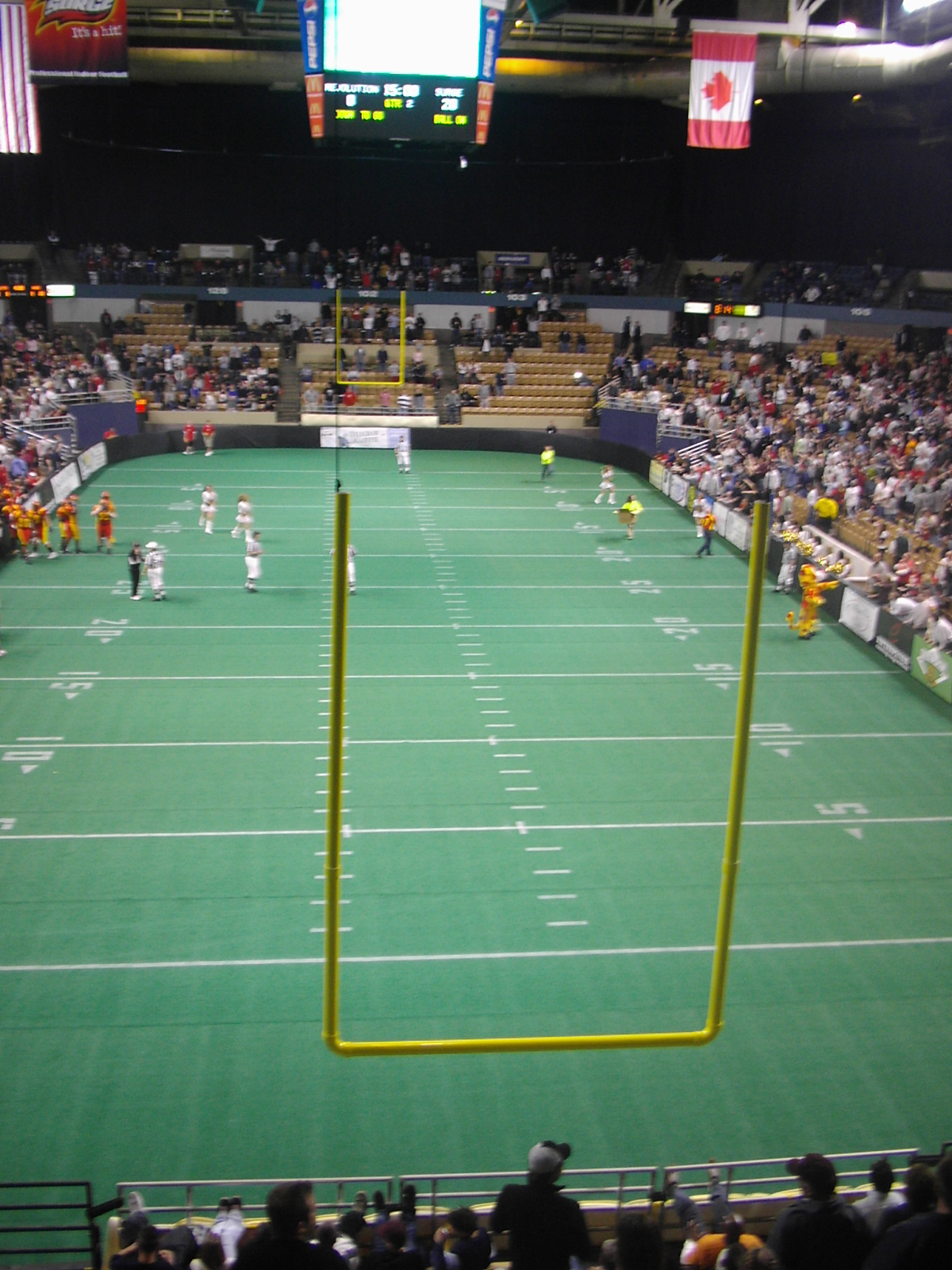
Hanged U-shaped Continental Indoor Football League goalpost

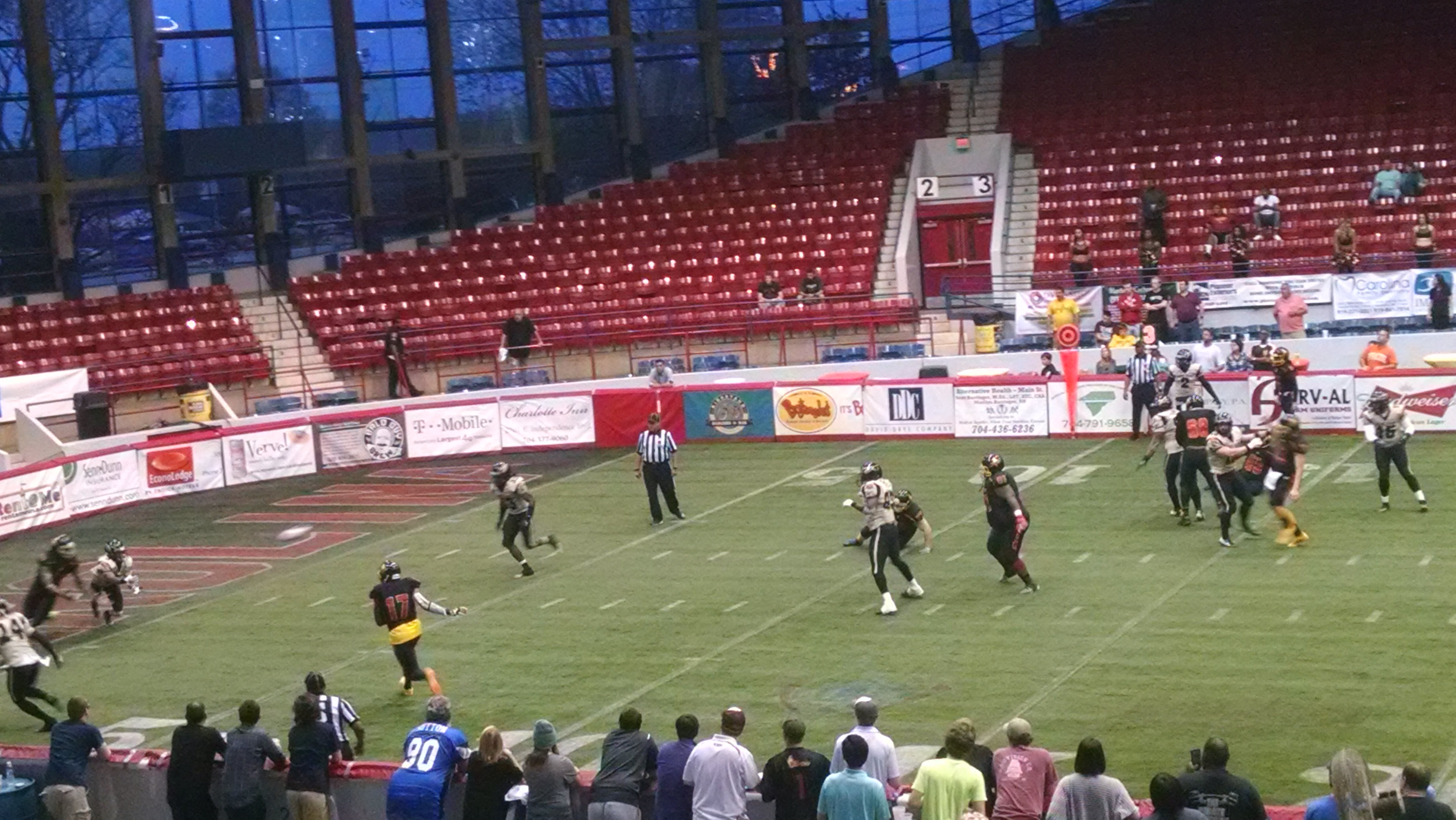
Lehigh Valley Steelhawks (gold jerseys with black accents) vs. Triangle Torch (black jerseys with red and yellow accents) play an American Indoor Football game at Dorton Arena in Raleigh, North Carolina, March 25, 2016

Other indoor football leagues have been formed, without the use of the rebound nets at the ends of the field. Like the AFL, their playing seasons are entirely or primarily outside the traditional fall/early winter season of the outdoor sport so as not to be competing with it directly for fan support.

Since the first such league, the Professional Indoor Football League, began play in the 1998, there has often been a pattern of instability. Each off-season has seen teams jumping from league to league. In addition, leagues have annually merged, changed names, and separated. The organization that is most recently known as American Indoor Football (AIF) went through three names and two ownership changes in its first three seasons. Several other indoor leagues have been announced without ever actually commencing play, or operating only briefly with a handful of teams. Some were claimed attempts to form a second "major" league of indoor football while others were strictly efforts to form a new "minor" league.

A few leagues have achieved a certain level of stability, however. The National Indoor Football League (NIFL) began in 2001 and was the most successful league in the early 2000s. The Indoor Football League (IFL) began in the autumn of 2008 when two already-established leagues (the Intense Football League and United Indoor Football) chose to merge into a single organization. The IFL's expansion model has been based less on establishing new teams and more on acquiring existing teams from other leagues. The IFL has 16 teams as of 2024. Other, regional leagues include Champions Indoor Football (CIF), the American Arena League (AAL) and National Arena League (NAL). Both CIF and the AAL were formed by mergers of existing leagues. The CIF was formed from a merger of the Champions Professional Indoor Football League and the Lone Star Football League in 2015. The AAL was formed in late 2017 as the combination of three leagues that each played one season: the Can-Am Indoor Football League, Arena Pro Football, and Supreme Indoor Football. Champions Indoor Football merged with the new Arena Football League prior to 2024.

Fan Controlled Football launched in 2021 following an interactive format inspired by video games, with "power-ups" and fans voting on plays. It generally targeted a higher caliber of player than the typical indoor league, with outdoor football veterans such as Johnny Manziel, Robert Turbin, Quinton Flowers, Quinn Porter, Shawn Oakman and Josh Gordon playing in the league's inaugural season, and Terrell Owens joining the following year (Michael Vick was also announced as a player midseason but did not play). FCF suspended operations following the 2022 season.

The best-known indoor women's football league was the Lingerie Football League, later rebranded the Legends Football League. Known for its scantily-clad players and its signature event, the Lingerie Bowl (later the Legends Cup), the LFL played a variant of indoor rules with most of its games in indoor stadiums, although a few teams experimented with playing in outdoor stadiums. The league's brief foray into Australia was played in outdoor stadiums; these teams nevertheless played under indoor football rules. The LFL folded in 2019 and its assets were sold to Mike Ditka, whose X League has, to date, played one season in 2022. All other women's leagues play on outdoor fields with outdoor rules; there have been several other attempts to form indoor women's football leagues, but none have made it to play.

== Arena Football rules ==
=== The field ===
An Arena Football field in comparison to a standard American Football size.

As its name implies, arena football is played exclusively indoors, in arenas usually designed for either basketball or ice hockey teams. The field is the same width 85 feet (26 m) and length 200 feet (61 m) as a standard NHL hockey rink, making it approximately 30% of the dimensions of a regular American gridiron football field, and 19% of a Canadian gridiron football field (the total playing area, including the end zones of an Arena football field is 17,000 square feet (1,600 m^{2})). The scrimmage area is 50 yards (46 m) long (unlike the field in NFL which is 100 yards (91 m) long), and each end zone is approximately 8 yards deep, two yards less than the standard 10 yards. Depending on the venue in which a game is being played, the end zones may be rectangular (like a basketball court) or, where necessary because of the building design, rounded (like a hockey rink; this is much like some Canadian football fields where the end zones can be cut off by a track). Each sideline has a heavily padded barrier, with the padding placed over the hockey dasher boards.

The goalpost uprights are 9 feet (2.7 m) wide, and the crossbar is 15 feet (4.6 m) above the playing surface, 50% narrower and higher than outdoor goalposts. In the original form of arena football, taut rebound nets on either side of the posts bounce any missed field goals back into the field of play. The ball is "live" when rebounding off these nets or their support apparatus. The entire goalframe and goalside rebound net system is suspended on cables from the rafters. The bottom of the two goalside rebound nets are 8 feet (2.4 m) off the playing surface. Each netframe is 32 feet (9.8 m) high by 30 feet (9.1 m) wide. (Other indoor leagues have used the same size goalpost but omit the rebound nets, due to their costs, inability to fit in arenas with lower ceilings, and—prior to 2007—the patent covering the rebound nets.)

A player is not counted as out of bounds on the sidelines unless he is pushed into or falls over the sideline barrier. This rule was put in place before the 2006 season. Before that time, a sideline with only a small amount of space (typically 6" to 12") existed between the sideline stripe and the barrier which would provide the space for a ball carrier to step out of bounds before hitting the sideline barrier.

=== The players ===
Each team fields 8 players at a time from a 21-man active roster. Before 2007, players played both offense and defense except for the Quarterback, Kicker, and Offensive Specialist (Wide Receiver/Running Back combination) and two Defensive Specialists (Defensive Backs).

=== Substitution rules ===
==== Rules before 2007 season ====
If a player enters and leaves, from the moment he leaves the player is considered "dead" and cannot return to play until the designated time is served.

- For two-way players "dead" time is one quarter.
- For specialists "dead" time is one half.

Exception: a "dead" player may participate on kickoffs, or as long snapper or holder. In 2006, the AFL changed its substitution rules such that free substitutions were allowed on all kickoffs.

==== New rules for 2007 season ====
The most significant change was the introduction of free substitution, the so-called "Elway Rule". Previously, AFL coaches were limited to one substitution per position per quarter. From 2007 to 2019 and come 2024, coaches can substitute players at will.

The rationale was that free substitution would improve the overall quality of football in the league by giving coaches the freedom to put their best players on the field for every play of the game, and that teams would be able to select from a wider player talent pool when building their rosters. Traditionalists, however, believed the rule changes were the beginning of the removal of the "ironman" (two-way offense and defense) style of play of arena football that the league had actively promoted for 20 seasons, and that the change took away a key component of what made arena football a distinctive sport.

==== New rules for 2024 season ====
The iteration of the league that began play in 2024 restored the "ironman" rules at the beginning of the season. After the league reorganized, the league abandoned ironman play and restored free substitution; unlike in 2007, the reason for the 2024 change was in part to justify salary cuts that were required when a previous commissioner—Lee Hutton, who was ousted in the reorganization—made promises to cover higher salaries but had no revenue to fund such promises (since under ironman, a player would fill the roles of what would have otherwise been two roster spots, justifying their higher price compared to a one-way player in other indoor leagues).

=== Formations ===
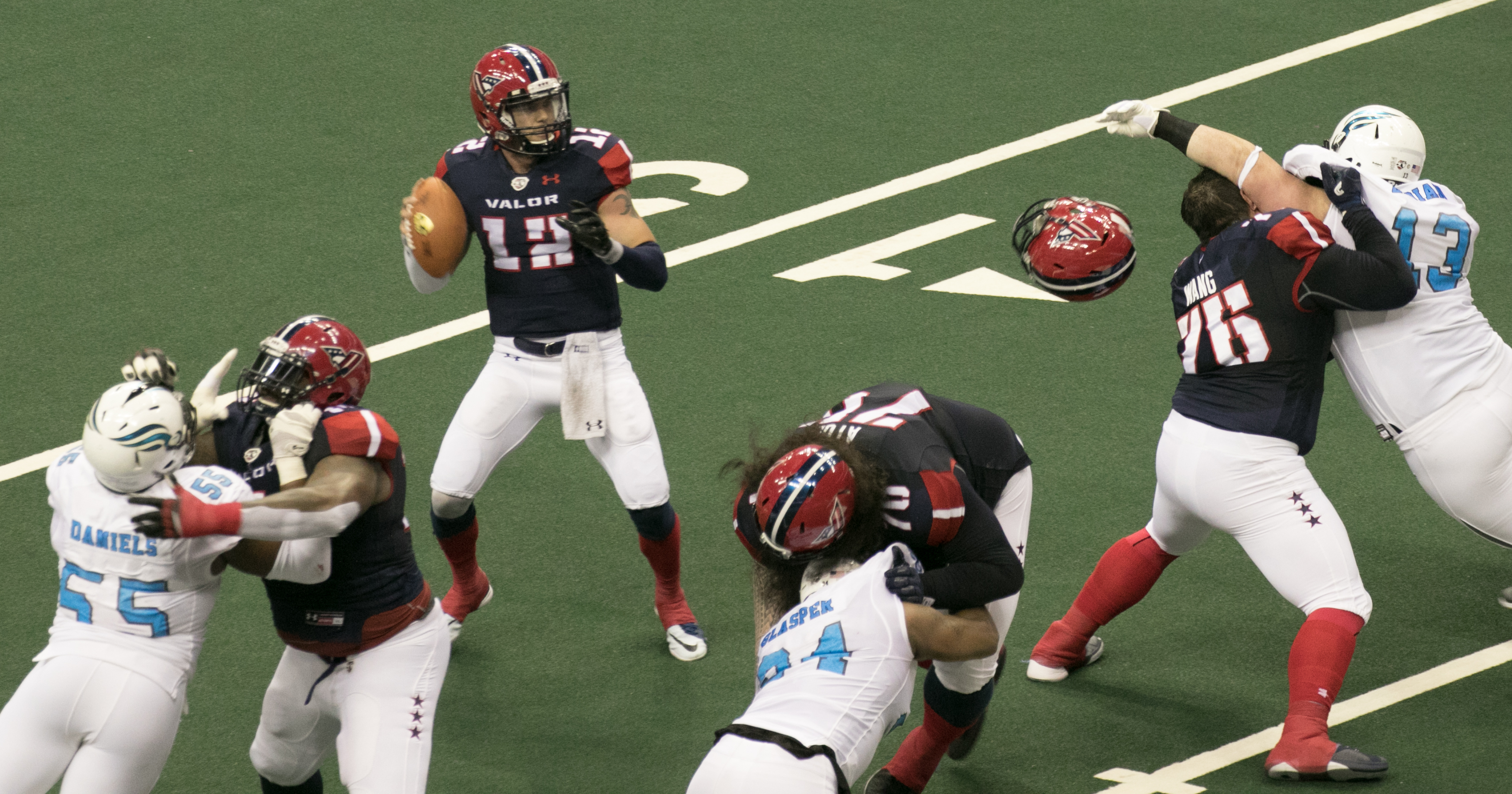
Washington Valor vs. Philadelphia Soul (2017)

Four offensive players must be on the line of scrimmage at the snap; one of the linemen must declare himself the tight end. One offensive player may be moving forward at the time of the snap as long as he has not yet crossed the line of scrimmage. Three defensive players must be in a three- or four-point stance at the start of the snap. Two defenders serve as linebackers, called the Mac and the Jack. The Mac may blitz from the side of the line opposite the offensive Tight End. The Jack's role has changed after new rules set in place by the league in 2008. The Jack cannot blitz, but under new, more defense-friendly rules, the Jack Linebacker may roam sideline to sideline within five yards of the line of scrimmage and drop into coverage once the Quarterback pump fakes. (Before this rule, the Jack could not drop back into coverage until the ball is thrown or the quarterback is no longer in the pocket, and the Jack had to stay within the box designated by the outside shoulders of the offensive line, the line of scrimmage, and five yards back from the line of scrimmage.)

=== Ball movement ===
The ball is kicked off from the goal line, to start the halves and odd overtimes, or after any score. The team with the ball is given four downs to gain ten yards or score. Punting is illegal because of the size of the playing field, however, a field goal that either misses wide (therefore bouncing off the nets surrounding the goalposts) or falls short, may be returned. Thus an impossibly long field goal is tantamount to a punt in other football variants. A receiver jumping to catch a pass needs to get only one foot down in bounds for the catch to be ruled a completed catch, just as in college football. Practically, this means that one foot must touch the ground before the receiver is pushed into the boards by an opposing player. Passes that bounce off the rebound nets remain "live." Balls that bounce off the padded walls that surround the field are "live"; the end zone walls were not live until the 2006 season.

Come 2025 gunners must line up on their own 15-yard line on kickoffs, with one receiving player fielding from the end zone.

=== Scoring ===
The scoring is the same as in the NFL with the addition of a drop kick field goal worth four points during normal play or two points as a post-touchdown conversion. Blocked extra points and turnovers on two-point conversion attempts may be returned by the defensive team for two points.

Arena Football One intends to continue the added point for a drop kick, as well as bringing in the deuce from previous fifty-yard game variants.

The league also instituted the "deuce": if a kickoff goes through the uprights, the kicking team receives two points. This rule had previously been in effect in the IFL and the NAL. The league also instituted the rouge / single, as used in the CFL, whereby, on a kickoff, the kicking team receives one point if the receiving team fails to bring the ball out of its own end zone.

After scoring a touchdown, the scoring team has the option of attempting a four-point conversion (akin to the three-point conversion seen in the UFL and its predecessors) from the opponent's ten-yard line, alongside the existing extra point and two-point conversion options. The rule was carried over as part of a pre-launch merger with Champions Indoor Football. Teams may go for two points from the 2.5-yard line, and before it was rescinded, three from the 5, or four from the 10, after any touchdown, if they want to.

Arena Football One rescinded the three-point and four-point conversions along with the single from its rulebook in 2025, while keeping the deuce. The single was restored to the rulebook in 2026.

=== Coaching challenges ===
Coaches are given two challenges per game, as in the NFL; to challenge, they must throw their red flag before the next play. If the play stands as called after review, the challenging team loses a timeout. If a team wins both challenges used, a third is granted. Video review is automatic in the final half-minute of regulation, all overtime periods, and all scoring plays and turnovers.

=== Timing ===
==== Current timing rules ====
A game has four 15-minute quarters with a 15-minute halftime (ArenaBowl has a 30-minute interval). Teams are allowed three timeouts per half, and two per overtime period if regulation ends tied. Teams must use a timeout if there's an injury inside a half-minute left in regulation or overtime; exception applies to when team has no timeouts, and this occurs, they're granted an extra timeout.

The clock stops for out-of-bounds plays, incomplete passes, or sacks only in the last half-minute of regulation or overtime (there is only a half-minute warning, as opposed to the two-minute warning in the XFL/NFL and the three-minute warning in the CFL) or because of penalties, injuries or timeouts. The clock also stops for any change in possession, until the ball is marked ready for play; for example, aside from the final half-minute of regulation or overtime, time continues to run down after a touchdown, but stops after an extra point or two-point conversion attempt. If a quarter ends as a touchdown is scored, an untimed conversion attempt takes place. The play clock is 30 seconds, starting at the end of the previous play. In all arenas, the final minute of the period is measured in tenths of a second.

Prior to the 2018 season, during the final minute of the fourth quarter, the clock stopped if the offensive team had the lead and did not advance the ball past the line of scrimmage. This prevented the "victory formation" (the offensive team merely kneeling down), or running other plays that are designed solely to exhaust the remaining time rather than to advance the ball downfield. This rule was eliminated in the interest of player safety.

In the first overtime, each team gets one possession to score. Whoever is ahead after one possession wins. If the teams are tied after each has had a possession, true sudden death rules apply thereafter. Each overtime period is 15 minutes, and continues from the ending of the previous overtime period until the tie is broken. All overtimes thereafter are true sudden death; no games can be tied. This includes both games of all semifinal series.

==== Previous timing rule changes ====
Before the 2007 season, there was one 15-minute overtime period, and if it expired with the teams still tied, the game was recorded as a tie. There were two ties in AFL history before the 2007 rule change:

- July 14, 1988: Chicago Bruisers 37, Los Angeles Cobras 37 (when this game was played, the overtime period was 7:30 long)
- April 8, 2005: Nashville Kats 41, Dallas Desperados 41

A July 25, 2015 game between the Las Vegas Outlaws and New Orleans VooDoo that was never played was also recorded as a scoreless tie.

Before 2007, the play clock was 25 seconds, and it began on the signal from the referee.

== Compensation ==
All current indoor football teams play at a minor league or semi-professional level. The average player's salary in the Arena Football League was US$1,800 per game in 2008; this is about one-quarter of the Canadian Football League (adjusted for inflation). Players in af2 were paid $250 per game and the AIFA and IFL had per-game salaries of $200 per game; the AFL paid $885 per game for most players in 2012, with that number rising to $940 per game in 2013 (although players then had to pay for their own housing, which the league previously provided); starting quarterbacks receive a $300 per game bonus. As of 2019, the IFL pays $200–$300 per game, with a $25 bonus for each win. FCF paid $400 to $750 a week. The 2024 revival of the AFL originally promised $1,000 per game, but this was soon rolled back to $250 per game (the salary of Champions Indoor Football in 2023) for most teams when the league reorganized. Arena Football One pays a base salary of $400 per week with players allowed to sign a personal service contract for more money. The NAL maximum per-player salary is $600 per game as of 2025.

== Connection to outdoor professional football ==
Some AFL players have gone on to have successful careers in the National Football League, most notably Kurt Warner. Warner played college football at University of Northern Iowa and then quarterbacked the AFL's Iowa Barnstormers to ArenaBowl X in 1996 and ArenaBowl XI in 1997, before earning two NFL MVP Awards, a Super Bowl MVP Award and quarterbacking the St. Louis Rams and the Arizona Cardinals to the Super Bowl, winning Super Bowl XXXIV with the Rams. Warner was later inducted into the Pro Football Hall of Fame, the only person to play a substantial portion of his professional career (as opposed to a short publicity stunt, as was the case with Joe DeLamielleure's brief tenure in the sport) playing arena football.

Another, probably the second most notable behind Warner, could be Fred Jackson. Jackson played indoor football with the Sioux City Bandits in 2004 when they played in the NIFL (2004) and the UIF in 2005 before finally moving on to NFL Europa's Rhein Fire in 2006, then to the NFL after Rhein.

Following an initial undistinguished NFL career, being released or unsigned for four seasons out of eight, quarterback Tommy Maddox would revitalize himself with the AFL's New Jersey Red Dogs for one season before going on to quarterback the Los Angeles Xtreme to the XFL championship win and eventually return to the NFL for five seasons, retiring with a Super Bowl ring after the Pittsburgh Steelers won Super Bowl XL.

Other AFL to NFL graduates include Anthony Armstrong, Oronde Gadsden, Lincoln Coleman, Adrian McPherson, Rashied Davis, Jay Feely, David Patten, Rob Bironas, Antonio Chatman, Mike Vanderjagt, and Paul Justin. Former Arena Football League MVP Jay Gruden (brother of Jon Gruden) went on to coach the Orlando Predators of the AFL, Florida Tuskers of the United Football League, and then the head coach for the Washington Redskins in the NFL. Eddie Brown, voted in 2006 as the greatest player in AFL history, never played in the NFL, but his son Antonio Brown joined the Pittsburgh Steelers in 2010 and was voted to the Pro Bowl in 2011 and in every season from 2013 to 2018. Matt Nagy was a quarterback in the AFL from 2002 to 2008 and became the head coach of the Chicago Bears in 2018.

Two players and one owner with substantial contributions (at least the majority of one season) have reached the Pro Football Hall of Fame: 2017 inductee Kurt Warner played the first three seasons of his professional career in the AFL, 2018 inductee Terrell Owens played his last professional season with the Indoor Football League in 2012, and the aforementioned Pat Bowlen was inducted into the Hall in 2019.

Green Bay Packers head coach Matt LaFleur was a quarterback for the Omaha Beef and the Billings Outlaws in the National Indoor Football League (NIFL). Running back Fred Jackson rushed for over 1,000 yards as the starting running back for the 2009 Buffalo Bills, and his high quality play earned him a spot on USA Today's "All-Joe" Team. Jackson played the early part of his professional football career for the Sioux City Bandits (now of Champions Indoor Football) and Michael Lewis played for the Louisiana Bayou Beast in 1999 and then with the New Orleans Saints.

The National Football League removed a ban that had been in place on any of its owners owning teams in any other sort of football operation with respect to Arena football only, and several of them had bought or started Arena teams at one point. However, the NFL allowed to lapse an option it had negotiated allowing it to purchase up to 49% of Arena football, and as of early 2007 seemed to have backed away from any plan it may have had to use Arena football as a developmental league in any sort of "official" sense, perhaps in the interest of not undermining its then-existing "official" developmental league, NFL Europa.

Several NFL owners owned Arena Football League teams in their own cities prior to the league's bankruptcy. At the end of the 2008 season, Jerry Jones and the Dallas Desperados (who had similar colors and logos to the Dallas Cowboys), Arthur Blank's Georgia Force, and the Colorado Crush (whose shareholders included Broncos owner Pat Bowlen and Rams then-minority owner Stan Kroenke) were still in the league. San Francisco 49ers owner Denise DeBartolo York and the Washington Commanders owner Daniel Snyder had future expansion rights to their respective cities. Tom Benson's original New Orleans VooDoo and Bud Adams's Nashville Kats had already folded prior to the bankruptcy and none of the NFL owners with AFL franchises returned to the league after its reformation in 2010, and most favored abolishing the league entirely.

Dozens of former and current professional outdoor football players also have invested money into indoor football franchises.

The IFL had a formal minor league partnership with the XFL in its 2023 season.

== Leagues ==
The following is a list of professional arena and indoor football leagues:

=== Current leagues ===
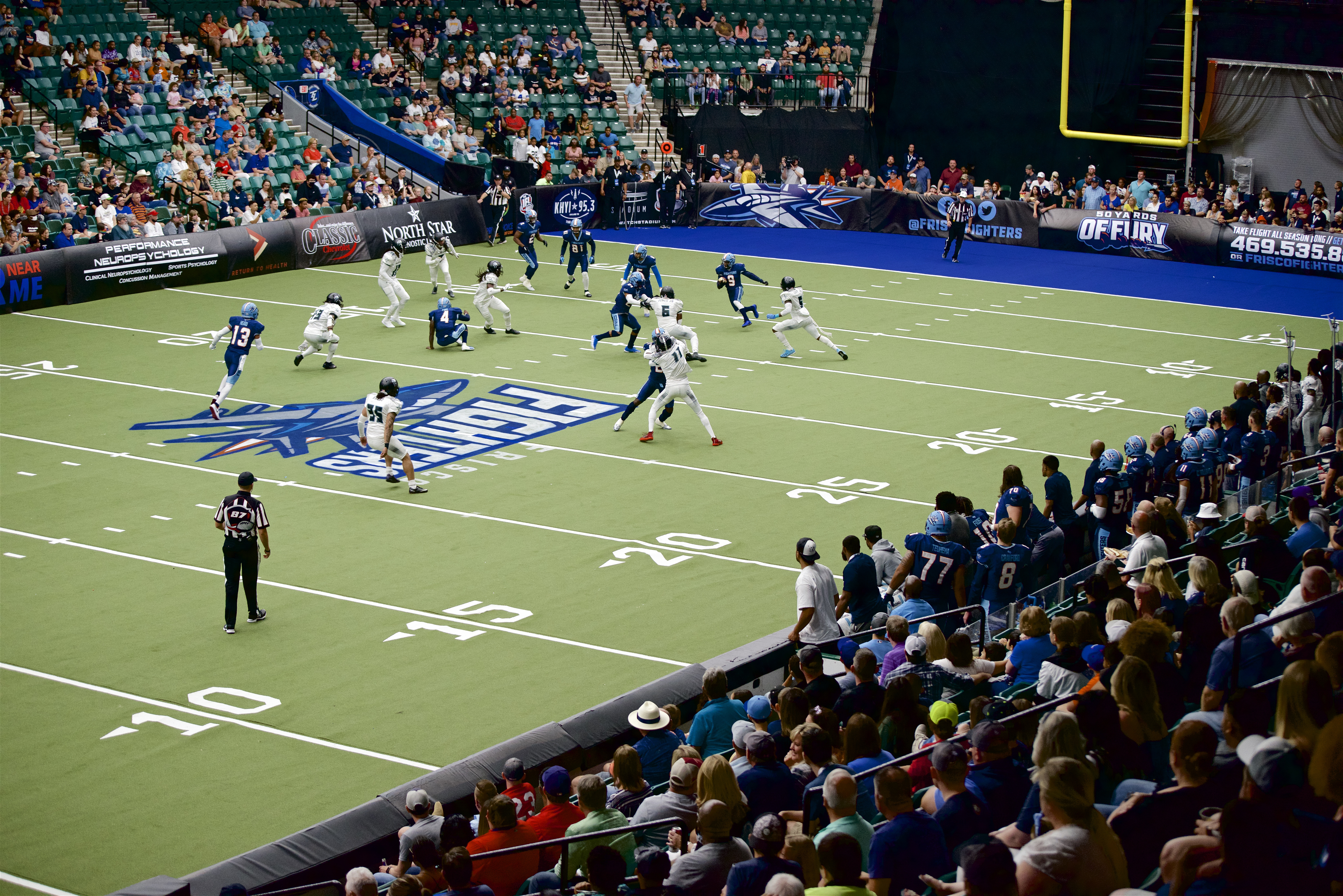
Indoor Football League

- American Arena League, 2017–2021, 2026–present
- American Arena League 2, 2023-present
- American Indoor Football (Montero/Clark), 2025–present
- Arena Football One (AF1), 2025–present
- Entertainment Football Association, 2025–present
- Greater Toronto Indoor Football League, 2024–present
- Gridiron Indoor Football League, 2024-present
- International Arena League, 2026-present
- Indoor Football League, 2008–present
- National Arena League; 2017–present
- The Arena League, 2024–present
- United Indoor Football Association, 2016–present
- United States Arena League, 2025–present
- Winter Indoor Football, 2024-present

=== On hiatus ===
- X League (women), 2022

=== Defunct leagues ===
- arenafootball2; 2000–2009
- Atlantic Indoor Football League; 2005–2006
- American Indoor Football (Morris), 2007–2010, 2012–2016, 2024
- American Indoor Football Alliance, 2021–2023
- American Professional Football League; 2003–2012
- American West Football Conference; 2019–2023
- Arena Football Association, 2021–2022
- Arena Football League (I); 1987–2008
- Arena Football League (II); 2010–2019
- Arena Football League (III), 2024
- Arena Pro Football; 2017 – Merged with Can-Am to form AAL in 2018
- Can-Am Indoor Football League; 2017 – Merged with APF to form AAL in 2018
- Champions Indoor Football; 2015–2023 – Merged with Arena Football League (III)
- Champions Professional Indoor Football League; 2013–2014 – Merged with LSFL to form CIF in 2015
- Continental Indoor Football League; 2006–2014
- Fan Controlled Football, 2021–2022
- Great Lakes Arena Football, 2023–2024
- Independent Indoor Football Alliance; 2007–2011
- Indoor Football League; 1999–2000
- Indoor Professional Football League; 1999–2001
- Intense Football League; 2004, 2006–2008 – Merged with United Indoor Football to become IFL
- Legends Football League (Lingerie Football League):
  - Lingerie Bowl standalone game: 2004–2009
  - United States: 2009–2019 (assets sold to Mike Ditka to become the X League)
  - Canada: 2012
  - Australia: 2013–2014
- Lone Star Football League; 2012–2014 – Merged with CPIFL to form CIF in 2015
- National Indoor Football League; 2001–2007
- North American Indoor Football League; 2005
- Professional Indoor Football League; 1998
- Professional Indoor Football League; 2012–2015
- Southern Indoor Football League; 2008–2011
- Supreme Indoor Football; 2017 – Professional teams joined AAL; league announced to become a development league
- Ultimate Indoor Football League; 2011–2014
- United Indoor Football; 2005–2008 – Merged with Intense Football League to become IFL
- World Indoor Football League; 1988 – Never played
- World Indoor Football League; 2007
- X-League Indoor Football; 2014–2015 – Merged into North American Indoor Football
- Xtreme Football League; 1999 – Never played, merged with af2

== Map of current teams ==
IFL teams (Red), AF1 teams (Yellow), NAL teams (Blue), TAL teams (Green), AIF teams (Purple), AAL teams (Pink), IAL teams (Orange), TBA (Grey)

== Other media ==
Several arena football video games and trading card sets have been released. Upper Deck released AFL trading card sets in 2005 and 2006.

Even though arena football is a relatively young sport, it has appeared in various forms of popular culture over the course of its existence. In 2014, AMC aired the reality television series 4th and Loud, following the first season of the LA Kiss and its owners, including Doc McGee and Kiss bandmates Paul Stanley and Gene Simmons.
