= 2026 CoFL season =

- League: Continental Football League (2026)
- Sport: American football
- Duration: May 23 - July 4, 2026
- Games: 4 preseason, 11 regular season
- Teams: 6
- Streaming partner: United Football Media
- Season MVP: William Arndt
- Finals champions: San Antonio Toros
- Runners-up: Tall City Black Gold

Seasons
- 2027

The 2026 CoFL season was the inaugural season of the Continental Football League.

== Offseason ==
On September 9, 2025, Manny Matsakis announced the relaunch of the Continental Football League, with former Winnipeg Blue Bombers head coach Mike Kelly named as commissioner. The new league was headquartered in Wheeling, West Virginia and announced Matsakis' Ohio Valley Ironmen as the first team. The Ironmen previously played for the International Football Alliance. The Cincinnati Dukes, a semi-pro team that had existed since 2012, agreed to join the league.

The league expanded to Texas with the addition of the San Antonio Toros, the Texas Syndicate in Austin, and the Tall City Black Gold in Midland. A fourth Texas team, the San Angelo Sidewinders, was announced, but was replaced by the Fort Worth Braves before the start of the season and completed the Southern Division.

In the Northern Division, the Indianapolis Capitals and the Michigan Arrows were added. However, prior to the start of the season, both teams folded.

The Fort Worth Braves folded just before week 1.

== Season ==
Due to the Fort Worth Braves, Indianapolis Capitals, and Michigan Arrows folding, the league filled the schedule with amateur & semi-pro teams. There was also an attempt by the league to create a pair of travel teams (the Norfolk Neptunes and the Vegas Gamblers), but neither team came to fruition.

After their first game in week 3, the Ohio Valley Ironmen folded due to financial issues, leaving the Cincinnati Dukes as the only remaining team in the Northern Division.

Before week 4, the Texas Herd, an independent semi-pro team, was added as an ancillary member of the league and replaced the Fort Worth Braves.

The San Antonio Toros cancelled their final game against the Texas Herd in order to focus on the 2027 season.

Due to the number of folded teams, the league cancelled the playoffs and the championship game. The San Antonio Toros were declared the champions and the Tall City Black Gold as the runners-up.

== Teams ==
| Division | Team | Location | Stadium | Head Coach | OC | DC |
|---|---|---|---|---|---|---|
| Northern | Cincinnati Dukes | Mason, Ohio | William Mason High School | Daryl Moore | Earnest Wilson | |
| Northern | Ohio Valley Ironmen | Martins Ferry, Ohio | Martins Ferry High School | Manny Matsakis | | Clint Lekanudos |
| Southern | San Antonio Toros | Castle Hills, Texas | The Christian School at Castle Hills | Stan Bedwell | | Jerry Glanville |
| Southern | Tall City Black Gold | Midland, Texas | Astound Broadband Stadium | Rodney Blackshear | Robert Ford | Lemuel Stinson |
| Southern | Texas Syndicate | Pflugerville, Texas | Pflugerville High School | James Champagne | Mike Olvera, Jr. | Juwan Owens |

=== Folded before season ===
| Team | Location | Head Coach | OC | DC |
|---|---|---|---|---|
| Fort Worth Braves | Fort Worth, Texas | Duck Contreras | Juan Wong | Darrell Patterson |
| Indianapolis Capitals | Westfield, Indiana | Hal Mumme | Dale Carlson | Mike Fanoga |
| Michigan Arrows | Detroit, Michigan | Steve Kazor | Les Koenning | Pepper Johnson |

=== Non-league teams ===
| Team | Location |
|---|---|
| Arkansas Nighthawks | Blytheville, Arkansas |
| Indy Bison | Indianapolis, Indiana |
| Kentuckiana Cavalry | Jeffersonville, Indiana |
| Midwest Vengeance | Indianapolis, Indiana |
| Tennessee Hornets | Spring Hill, Tennessee |
| Texas Herd | Longview, Texas |

== Standings ==
Northern Division
| Team | W | L | PCT | PF | PA | DIFF |
|---|---|---|---|---|---|---|
| ~~Ohio Valley~~ | 1 | 0 | 1.000 | 35 | 7 | 28 |
| Cincinnati | 1 | 2 | 0.333 | 75 | 87 | -12 |

Southern Division
| Team | W | L | PCT | PF | PA | DIFF |
|---|---|---|---|---|---|---|
| San Antonio | 5 | 0 | 1.000 | 139 | 30 | 109 |
| Tall City | 2 | 3 | 0.400 | 119 | 134 | -15 |
| Texas | 2 | 3 | 0.400 | 68 | 137 | -69 |
| Herd | 0 | 2 | 0.000 | 12 | 83 | -71 |

== Season schedule ==
==== Preseason ====
| Date | Away Team | Result | | Home Team |
|---|---|---|---|---|
| May 23 | Midwest Vengeance | 0 | 45 | Cincinnati Dukes |
| May 23 | Arkansas Nighthawks | 0 | 53 | Texas Syndicate |
| May 23 | Texas Herd | 0 | 26 | Tall City Black Gold |
| May 25 | Tennessee Hornets | 0 | 71 | San Antonio Toros |

==== Week 1 ====
| Date | Away Team | Result | | Home Team |
|---|---|---|---|---|
| May 30 | Indy Bison | 28 | 14 | Cincinnati Dukes |
| May 30 | San Antonio Toros | 24 | 0 | Texas Syndicate |

==== Week 2 ====
| Date | Away Team | Result | | Home Team |
|---|---|---|---|---|
| June 6 | Texas Syndicate | 23 | 20 | Tall City Black Gold |
| June 6 | Kentuckiana Cavalry | 24 | 54 | Cincinnati Dukes |

==== Week 3 ====
| Date | Away Team | Result | | Home Team |
|---|---|---|---|---|
| June 13 | Ohio Valley Ironmen | 35 | 7 | Cincinnati Dukes |
| June 13 | Tall City Black Gold | 0 | 59 | San Antonio Toros |

==== Week 4 ====
| Date | Away Team | Result | | Home Team |
|---|---|---|---|---|
| June 20 | Texas Syndicate | 6 | 56 | San Antonio Toros |
| June 21 | Texas Herd | 6 | 44 | Tall City Black Gold |

==== Week 5 ====
| Date | Away Team | Result | | Home Team |
|---|---|---|---|---|
| June 27 | Texas Herd | 6 | 39 | Texas Syndicate |
| June 28 | San Antonio Toros | 46 | 24 | Tall City Black Gold |

==== Week 6 ====
| Date | Away Team | Result | | Home Team |
|---|---|---|---|---|
| July 4 | Tall City Black Gold | 31 | 0 | Texas Syndicate |

== Awards ==
Individual Awards
| Award | Winner | Position | Team |
|---|---|---|---|
| Most Valuable Player | William Arndt | QB | Toros |
| Offensive Player of the Year | Cameron Echols-Luper | WR | Toros |
| Defensive Player of the Year | Justin Whiteside | LB | Black Gold |

All-CoFL Team
| Position | Player | Team |
|---|---|---|
| QB | William Arndt | Toros |
| QB | Kimani Murray | Dukes |
| RB | Trey Sanders | Syndicate |
| RB | Darnell Williams | Dukes |
| WR | Cameron Echols-Luper | Toros |
| WR | Caleb Jolivette | Black Gold |
| WR | Lance LeGendre | Toros |
| WR | Tyrell Sanders | Dukes |
| OL | Gabe Bookman | Dukes |
| OL | Andrew Devine | Toros |
| OL | Matthew Foster | Black Gold |
| OL | Logan Weedman | Toros |
| DL | Praise Amaewhule | Black Gold |
| DL | Myles McHaney | Toros |
| DL | Pius Njenge | Syndicate |
| DL | Dominic Oliver | Black Gold |
| LB | Jacob Berry | Syndicate |
| LB | Durand Hill | Toros |
| LB | Wesley Steiner | Toros |
| LB | Eddy Toussom | Toros |
| LB | Justin Whiteside | Black Gold |
| DB | Coby Calvin | Black Gold |
| DB | Lu-Magia Hearns | Toros |
| DB | Jamison Lindsey | Black Gold |
| DB | Obi Melifonwu | Toros |
| DB | Abraham Temoney III | Syndicate |
| K | Eddie Godina | Black Gold |
| P | Clark Riedel | Black Gold |
| LS | Cade Collenback | Toros |
| KR | Chris Carpenter | Toros |

All-CoFL Honorable Mentions
| Position | Player | Team |
|---|---|---|
| QB | Trey Goodman | Black Gold |
| RB | Andrew Henry | Toros |
| RB | Rayquan Smith | Syndicate |
| WR | Chris Carpenter | Toros |
| TE | Oscar Cardenas | Toros |
| DL | Will Green | Black Gold |
| DL | Emmanuel Johnson | Syndicate |
| LB | Ivory Parker | Dukes |
| DB | Gabriel Adewusi | Black Gold |
| DB | Kevon Burnett | Dukes |
| DB | Zayteak McGhee | Toros |
| DB | LaCarea Pleasant-Johnson | Syndicate |
| DB | Leondre Pope | Dukes |
| K | Kenneth Almendares | Toros |
