= 2027 CoFL season =

2nd season of the Continental Football League

The 2027 CoFL season will be the 2nd season of the Continental Football League.

== Offseason ==
Shortly after the end of the truncated 2026 season, Mike Kelly retired as commissioner of the league and Manny Matsakis was promoted to league CFO. On September 11, 2026, Jason Phillips was hired as the Executive Vice President of League Development. Matsakis moved the league headquarters from Wheeling, West Virginia to Indianapolis, Indiana.

Priority was placed on expanding the league to 8 teams with them equally split into the Northern and Southern Divisions. The Cincinnati Dukes, San Antonio Toros, Tall City Black Gold, and Texas Syndicate all plan to play in the 2026 season while the Texas Herd, an affiliate team, was not invited back.

The Indianapolis Capitals were announced on July 31, 2026 after the first attempt to establish the team for the 2026 season failed. Mike Vanderjagt, a former kicker for the Indianapolis Colts, was named as their head coach.

On September 11, 2026, the Milwaukee Silverbacks were added and named Gilbert Brown, a former nose tackle for the Green Bay Packers, as the head coach.

Matsakis also promised 'a true salary cap for all clubs,' 'shared roster-building standards,' and 'closer collaboration between the league office and owners to drive parity.

For rules, the Continental Shift, which stated in the 4th quarter the rules of play switch from American rules to Canadian rules, would be moved up to after halftime. The rule was renamed the Continental Divide.

== Teams ==
Division	Team	Location	Stadium	Head Coach	OC	DC
Northern	Cincinnati Dukes	Mason, Ohio	William Mason High School	Daryl Moore		
Northern	Indianapolis Capitals	Westfield, Indiana	Grand Park	Mike Vanderjagt	Damon Allen	Tyler Orlosky
Northern	Milwaukee Silverbacks	Milwaukee, Wisconsin	TBA	Gilbert Brown	Andre Rison	Keith McKenzie
Southern	San Antonio Toros	Castle Hills, Texas	The Christian School at Castle Hills	Stan Bedwell		Jerry Glanville
Southern	Tall City Black Gold	Midland, Texas	Astound Broadband Stadium	Rodney Blackshear	Robert Ford	Lemuel Stinson
Southern	Texas Syndicate	Pflugerville, Texas	Pflugerville High School	Mike Olvera Jr.	Matthew Washington	Kevin Garrett
