= Manny Matsakis =

American football player and coach (born 1962)

Biographical details
- Born: April 16, 1962 (age 64); New Britain, Connecticut, U.S.
- Education: Capital

Playing career
- 1987: Indianapolis Colts
- Position: Placekicker

Coaching career (HC unless noted)
- 1989–1990: Kansas State (assistant)
- 1991–1993: Hofstra (OC)
- 1994: Kansas State (TE/ST)
- 1995–1998: Emporia State
- 1999: Wyoming (OC/QB)
- 2000–2002: Texas Tech (ST)
- 2003: Texas State
- 2008: Capital (OC)
- 2009: Winnipeg Blue Bombers (RB)
- 2010–2012: Enka HS (NC)
- 2013–2014: Bethany (KS)
- 2015–2017: Widener (OC)
- 2018–2020: Defiance
- 2025–present: Ohio Valley Ironmen

Head coaching record
- Overall: 43–62 (college); 13–23 (high school)

Emmanouel M. Matsakis (born April 16, 1962) is an American football coach and former player.. He is currently the chief executive officer, founder and de facto commissioner of the Continental Football League, a minor professional football league. Matsakis has also served as the head football coach at Emporia State University from 1995 to 1998, at Texas State University in 2003, at Bethany College in Lindsborg, Kansas from 2013 to 2014, and at Defiance College from 2018 to 2020.

== Playing career ==
Matsakis is a 1984 graduate of Capital University in Columbus, Ohio, where he was a four-year letter winner and a three-time First Team All-Ohio Athletic Conference selection as a kicker. He still currently holds the school record for longest field goal, a 54-yarder in 1981. He was drafted by the Philadelphia Eagles in the 8th round with the 200th overall pick, in the 1984 draft. He played for the Indianapolis Colts during the 1987 NFL season in which the league used replacement players due to a strike.

== Coaching career ==
=== Emporia State ===
Matsakis was the 19th head football coach for Emporia State University in Emporia, Kansas and he held that position for four seasons, from 1995 until 1998. His overall coaching record at Emporia State was 26–18.

=== Texas State ===
Matsakis was head coach at Texas State in San Marcos, Texas, in 2003 but was fired in early 2004, along with the school's athletic director, after an investigation found NCAA violations within the program, including extra practice time above the limit. His overall coaching record at Texas State was 4–8.

=== Assistant coaching and high school ===
During the mid 1990s, Matsakis served as an assistant coach at Hofstra University on Long Island. In 1999, Matsakis served as the offensive coordinator at the University of Wyoming. In 2000, he accepted the position of special teams coach at Texas Tech, where he coached until he became the head coach at Texas State for the 2003 season. Matsakis returned to Capital University when he was hired as the offensive coordinator for his alma mater on February 15, 2008, by new head coach Jim Bickel. Matsakis was hired by the Winnipeg Blue Bombers of the Canadian Football League (CFL) to replace the ill Andy Cox as their running backs coach two weeks into the 2009 season.

In 2010, Matsakis was hired to be the head coach at Enka High School in Candler, North Carolina where his teams compiled a 13–23 record before resigning in 2013.

=== Bethany ===
In March 2013, Matsakis was hired as the 17th head coach for the Bethany Swedes in Lindsborg, Kansas. He remained there as head coach for the 2013 and 2014 seasons.

=== Widener ===
Matsakis spent the three years, 2015 to 2017, as the offensive coordinator at Widener University in Chester, Pennsylvania.

=== Defiance ===
In July 2018, Defiance College announced that it had selected Matsakis as head coach of the Yellow Jackets. In August 2021, he was fired from the program and was replaced by Earnest Wilson, who was appointed interim head coach.

=== Ohio Valley Ironmen ===
On October 30, 2024, Matsakis was named the head coach of the Ohio Valley Ironmen, a team that was originally to play in the International Football Alliance. Matsakis indicated that he had chosen the name because he was a fan of the original Ohio Valley Ironmen in the 1960s as a child. After numerous legal issues with other IFA teams, the Ironmen revised their schedule to consist mostly of semi-pro teams from other leagues in April 2025, two months before its launch. Such complications eventually led to the Ironmen ending its schedule after three games, with Matsakis suggesting that the team's dominant performances in its early games, along with the ongoing financial and legal troubles of the IFA and its other franchises (the remaining schedule consisted mostly of teams that the Ironmen had already beaten and IFA teams that had already ceased operations or never made it to play), had made continuing the season untenable. Matsakis vowed to bring the Ironmen back for a 2026 season. In September 2025, he announced the establishment of a revival of the Continental Football League, for which the Ironmen would serve as the flagship franchise. The Ironmen folded on June 19, 2026, following the loss of sponsor funding and continued scheduling difficulties. Matsakis remained with the CoFL and moved into the league's central office following the resignation of inaugural commissioner Mike Kelly.

== Head coaching record ==
=== College ===
Year	Team	Overall	Conference	Standing	Bowl/playoffs
Emporia State Hornets (Mid-America Intercollegiate Athletics Association) (1995–1998)
1995	Emporia State	5–6	4–5	6th	
1996	Emporia State	5–6	5–4	T–4th	
1997	Emporia State	7–4	5–4	5th	
1998	Emporia State	9–2	7–2	2nd	
Emporia State:		26–18	21–15		
Texas State Bobcats (Southland Conference) (2003)
2003	Texas State	5–7	2–3	T–3rd	
Texas State:		5–7	2–3		
Bethany Swedes (Kansas Collegiate Athletic Conference) (2013–2014)
2013	Bethany	2–9	1–8	T–9th	
2014	Bethany	6–5	5–4	T–4th	
Bethany:		8–14	6–12		
Defiance Yellow Jackets (Heartland Collegiate Athletic Conference) (2018–2021)
2018	Defiance	1–9	1–7	8th	
2019	Defiance	1–9	1–6	T–7th	
2020–21	Defiance	2–5	2–5	6th	
Defiance:		4–23	4–18		
Total:		43–62			
