= Cameron Echols-Luper =

American football player (born 1995)

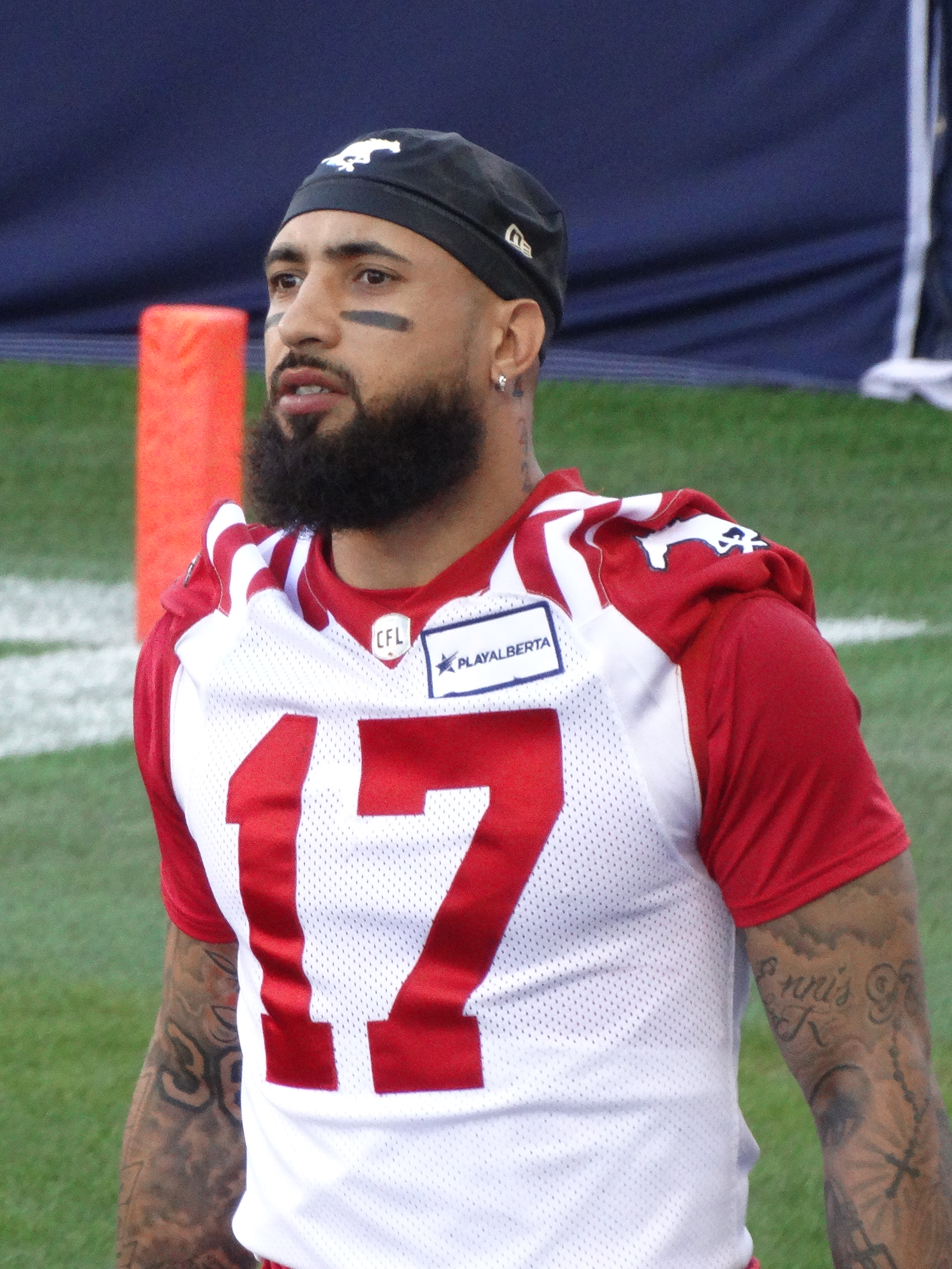
- Echols-Luper with the Calgary Stampeders in 2024

San Antonio Toros
- Positions: Wide receiver, return specialist
- Roster status: Active

Personal information
- Born: April 9, 1995 (age 31); Ennis, Texas, U.S.
- Listed height: 6 ft 0 in (1.83 m)
- Listed weight: 190 lb (86 kg)

Career information
- High school: Auburn (Auburn, Alabama)
- College: TCU (2013–2014); Arkansas State (2015–2016); Western Kentucky (2017)
- NFL draft: 2018: undrafted

Career history
- 2018: Hamilton Tiger-Cats*
- 2019: BC Lions*
- 2022–2023: New Jersey Generals
- 2024: New Orleans Breakers*
- 2024: Calgary Stampeders
- 2025: Winnipeg Blue Bombers
- 2026: Birmingham Stallions*
- 2026–present: San Antonio Toros
- * Offseason or practice squad member only

Awards and highlights
- USTFCCA second-team All-American (2014); Big 12 indoor long jump champion (2015)
- Stats at CFL.ca

Cameron Damonte Echols-Luper (born Cameron Damonte Echols; April 9, 1995) is an American professional football player who is a wide receiver and return specialist for the San Antonio Toros of the Continental Football League (CoFL). He attended Auburn High School in Auburn, Alabama, where he was a quarterback and won six state titles in track and field. He played college football for the TCU Horned Frogs from 2013 to 2014 as a wide receiver and earned Phil Steele second-team freshman All-American honors as a punt returner. Echols-Luper participated in track and field while at TCU as well, garnering Outdoor USTFCCA second-team All-American recognition for his performance in the 4 × 100 relay during the 2014 outdoor track season, and also winning the long jump event at the 2015 Big 12 Indoor Championships. He then transferred to play football for the Arkansas State Red Wolves as a quarterback in 2015 but ended up playing wide receiver there as well after sitting out his first season due to NCAA transfer rules. In 2016, he was named the "Fastest Receiver" in the Sun Belt by the Sporting News and was also listed on NFL.com's "16 for '16: College football's most freakish athletes". He transferred to play his final season of college football for the Western Kentucky Hilltoppers in 2017.

After going undrafted in 2018, Echols-Luper spent time on the practice rosters of the Hamilton Tiger-Cats and BC Lions of the Canadian Football League (CFL) from 2018 to 2019. He later played for the New Jersey Generals of the United States Football League (USFL) from 2022 to 2023, the Calgary Stampeders of the CFL in 2024, and the Winnipeg Blue Bombers of the CFL in 2025.

== Early life ==
Cameron Damonte Echols was born on April 9, 1995, in Ennis, Texas. His father, Curtis Luper, is a football coach. Echols-Luper played high school football at Auburn High School in Auburn, Alabama, as a quarterback and was a three-year starter. He recorded 2,339 total yards of offense and 25 touchdowns his junior year. His senior year, he threw for 1,036 yards and 11 touchdowns while also rushing for 898 yards and seven touchdowns, leading Auburn high to a loss in the Class 6A quarterfinals. Among the class of 2013, he was rated as the No. 19 overall prospect in Alabama, the No. 7 wide receiver in Alabama and the No. 131 wide receiver in the country by Scout.com. Echols-Luper was also rated a three-star prospect, the No. 15 overall prospect in the state and the No. 55 wide receiver nationally by 247Sports.com. ESPN rated him a three-star prospect, the No. 34 overall prospect in Alabama, and the No. 126 "athlete" in the country. In August 2012, he committed to Texas A&M to play college football. However, in January 2013, he switched his commitment to TCU.

Echols-Luper also participated in track and field in high school, winning state titles in the long jump (23'-6"), 200-meter dash (21.28 seconds), and 4 × 100 relay his junior year. He won the state title in all three events again his senior year as well with 24'-3.75" in the long jump, 21.81 seconds in the 200-meter dash (21.81), and 24.34 seconds in the 4 × 100 relay.

== College career ==
Echols-Luper first played college football for the TCU Horned Frogs from 2013 to 2014. He caught four passes for 21 yards and returned 14 punts for 187 yards as a freshman in 2013, earning Phil Steele second-team freshman All-American honors as a punt returner. He also threw a 38-yard touchdown on a trick play. In 2014, Echols-Luper recorded nine catches for 72 yards, 33 punt returns for 349 yards and one touchdown, and nine kick returns for 103 yards. He was named on NFL.com's "14 for '14: Fastest players in college football". Echols-Luper participated in track at TCU as well. During the 2013–14 indoor track season, he finished in second place in the long jump at the Reveille Invitational, the Texas A&M Invitational, and the Big 12 Indoor Championships. His 7.40 jump at the Texas A&M Invitational was the fifth-best in the Big 12 that season. In the 200-meter dash, he finished in fourth place at the New Mexico Invitational and seventh place at the Big 12 Indoor Championships. During the 2014 outdoor track season, he had a first-place finish at the Rafer Johnson/Jackie Joyner-Kersee Invitational in both the 200-meters and the 4 × 100 relay, a second-place finish in the 4 × 100 relay at the Michael Johnson Classic, and a second-place finish in the 4 × 100 relay at the Big 12 Outdoor Championships. The 4 × 100 relay team finished in 11th place at the 2014 NCAA Outdoor Championships. Echols-Luper was named an Outdoor USTFCCA second-team All-American for his performance in the 4 × 100 relay during the 2014 outdoor track season. During the 2014–15 indoor track season, he finished second in the long jump at the New Mexico Team Invitational and first in the long jump at the Big 12 Indoor Championships with a jump of 24'-11.75". He later finished in fifth place at the 2015 NCAA Indoor Championships with a long jump of 25'-11.5". During the 2015 outdoor track season, which ended up being his final season of college track, he had a first-place finish in the long jump at the Michael Johnson Classic, a second-place finish at the TCU Horned Frog Invite, a fourth-place finish at the Big 12 Outdoor Championships, and a ninth-place finish at the 2015 NCAA Outdoor Championships. The 4 × 100 relay team also finished second at the NCAA Outdoor Championships with a time of 38.59 seconds. In January 2015, it was reported that Echols-Luper would be playing defense for the TCU football team in 2015.

In August 2015, Echols-Luper transferred to Arkansas State to play quarterback. However, he did not end up playing quarterback there. He had to sit out, and redshirt, the 2015 season due to NCAA transfer rules. In 2016, Echols-Luper caught 26 passes for 407 yards and one touchdown, threw a 35-yard touchdown on a trick play, returned six punts and two kickoffs, and punted four times for 139 yards. He was named the "Fastest Receiver" in the Sun Belt by the Sporting News in 2016. He was also listed on NFL.com's "16 for '16: College football's most freakish athletes". He majored in general studies at Arkansas State.

Echols-Luper transferred to play for Western Kentucky in 2017. In March 2017, he was suspended indefinitely from the team after being arrested for misdemeanor drug possession. He was later cleared to play in August 2017. Echols-Luper totaled 42 receptions for 473 yards and four touchdowns while also returning 18 kicks for 390 yards for the Hilltoppers.

== Professional career ==
Echols-Luper participated at Western Kentucky's Pro Day in 2018, posting 4.59 seconds in the 40-yard dash, 29.5" in the vertical jump, and 9'-3" in the broad jump. After going undrafted in the 2018 NFL draft, Echols-Luper attended rookie minicamp on a tryout basis with the Indianapolis Colts but was not signed.

Echols-Luper was signed to the practice roster of the Hamilton Tiger-Cats of the Canadian Football League (CFL) on July 30, 2018. He was released on September 2, 2018, and later re-signed by the team on January 3, 2019. He was released again on May 6, 2019.

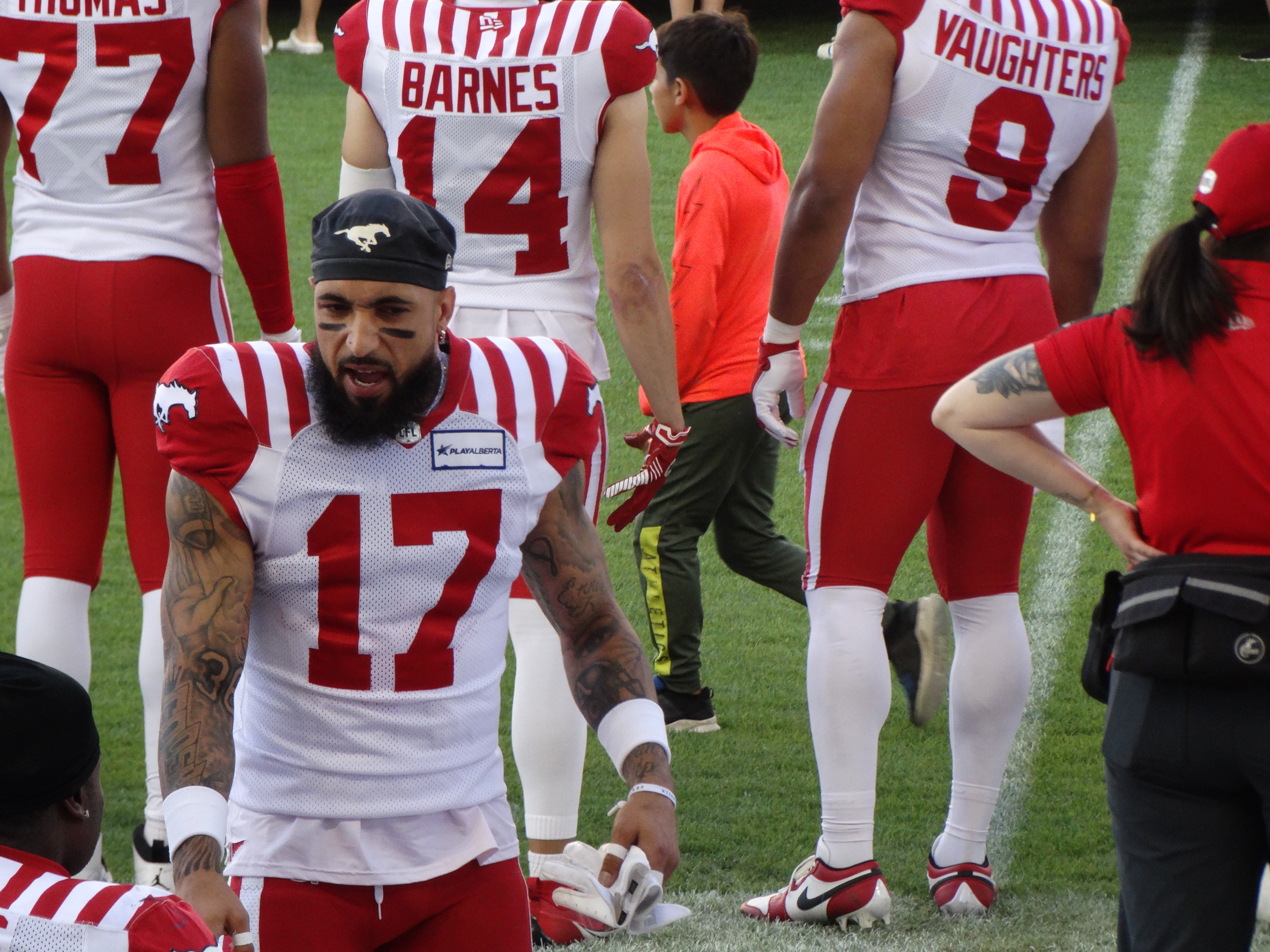
Echols-Luper with the Stampeders in 2024

Echols-Luper was signed to the practice roster of the BC Lions of the CFL on September 10, 2019. He was released on October 9, but later signed to a futures contract on October 29, 2019. The 2020 CFL season was cancelled due to the COVID-19 pandemic, and Echols-Luper became a free agent in February 2021. He played for the Sea Lions of The Spring League in 2021, catching 13 passes for 193 yards.

On April 1, 2022, Echols-Luper signed with the New Jersey Generals of the United States Football League (USFL). He played in eight games in 2022, recording three receptions for 38 yards, one rushing attempt for a 24-yard touchdown, and 26 kickoff returns for 748 yards. He appeared in all 10 games in 2023, catching 23 passes for 295 yards and two touchdowns while also returning eight kickoffs for 255 yards and one touchdown. Echols-Luper was named the Special Teams Player of the Week for Week 9 of the 2023 season after returning the opening kickoff 85 yards for a touchdown. He became a free agent on October 1, 2023.

Echols-Luper was signed by the New Orleans Breakers of the USFL on October 4, 2023. The Breakers were not included in the merger of the XFL and USFL that formed the new United Football League (UFL).

Echols-Luper signed with the Calgary Stampeders of the CFL on January 31, 2024. After a season-ending injury to starting wide receiver Malik Henry, and with Echols-Luper having led the team with 229 receiving yards during the preseason, Echols-Luper ended up making the team's regular season roster. He was moved between the active roster, 1-game injured list, and practice roster several times during the 2024 season. Overall, he dressed in 12 games, all starts, for the Stampeders that season, totaling 31 receptions for 363 yards and four touchdowns, 12 punt returns for 109 yards, and eight kickoff returns for 181 yards. He was with the team in training camp in 2025, but was part of the final roster cuts on June 1, 2025.

On August 25, 2025, Echols-Luper was signed to the practice roster of the CFL's Winnipeg Blue Bombers. He was promoted to the active roster on October 24 and played in one game, catching two passes for eight yards on four targets. He was moved back to the practice roster on October 31, and placed on the injured list on November 1. Echols-Luper was released by the Blue Bombers on December 23, 2025.

In January 2026, Echols-Luper was selected by the Birmingham Stallions in the 2026 UFL draft. He was released by the Stallions in March 2026 before the start of the regular season. Thereafter, he signed with the San Antonio Toros of the upstart Continental Football League (CoFL) for the 2026 season. Echols-Luper caught 20 passes for 342 yards and four touchdowns as the Toros went 5–0. He was named the CoFL Offensive Player of the Year while the Toros were named league champions.
