= Wesley Steiner =

American gridiron football player (born 2002)

No. 50 – BC Lions
- Position: Linebacker
- Roster status: Active
- CFL status: American

Personal information
- Born: February 21, 2002 (age 24); Warner Robins, Georgia, U.S.
- Listed height: 6 ft 2 in (1.88 m)
- Listed weight: 250 lb (113 kg)

Career information
- High school: Houston County (Warner Robins)
- College: Auburn (2020–2023); Washington State (2024)
- NFL draft: 2025: undrafted

Career history
- Las Vegas Raiders (2025)*; Seattle Seahawks (2025)*; San Antonio Toros (2026); BC Lions (2026–present)
- * Offseason or practice squad member only
- Stats at CFL.ca

Wesley Steiner (born February 21, 2002) is an American professional football linebacker for the BC Lions of the Canadian Football League (CFL). He played college football for the Auburn Tigers and Washington State Cougars.

== Early life ==
Steiner was born on February 21, 2002, in Warner Robins, Georgia. He attended Houston County High School in Warner Robins, where he had 93 tackles as a senior. On December 18, 2019, Steiner signed a National Letter of Intent to play college football at Auburn University.

== College career ==
Steiner played college football for the Auburn Tigers from 2020 to 2023 and Washington State Cougars in 2024. In 47 games at Auburn, he had 87 tackles, including two for loss. On April 22, 2024, Steiner entered the transfer portal. On May 10, he committed to Washington State University. In his lone season at Washington State, Steiner made 11 tackles, one for a loss, one forced fumble and one fumble recovery.

== Professional career ==
Pre-draft measurables
Height	Weight	Arm length	Hand span	Wingspan	40-yard dash	10-yard split	20-yard split	20-yard shuttle	Three-cone drill	Vertical jump	Broad jump	Bench press
6 ft 0 in (1.83 m)	235 lb (107 kg)	31 1/4 in (0.79 m)	9 3/8 in (0.24 m)	6 ft 5 1/2 in (1.97 m)	4.42 s	1.55 s	2.63 s	4.27 s	7.24 s	39 in (0.99 m)	11 ft 3 in (3.43 m)	23 reps
All values from Pro Day

=== Las Vegas Raiders ===
After not being selected in the 2025 NFL draft, Steiner signed with the Las Vegas Raiders as an undrafted free agent. On May 21, he was released by the team.

=== Seattle Seahawks ===
On August 14, 2025, Steiner was signed by the Seattle Seahawks as a fullback. On August 27 he was waived with injury designation.

=== San Antonio Toros ===
On May 8, 2026, Steiner was signed by the San Antonio Toros of the Continental Football League. On July 23rd, 2026, he was named to the All-CoFL team.

=== BC Lions ===
On October 6, 2026, Steiner signed with the BC Lions of the Canadian Football League (CFL), and joined their practice squad. On October 8, 2026, Steiner was promoted to the Lions' active roster and made his CFL debut in a win over the Ottawa Redblacks the next day. On October 22, 2026, Steiner was placed on the Lions' 1-game injured list. He rejoined the active roster on October 30, 2026, ahead of the Western Semi-Final.
