= Antonian College Preparatory High School =

Location
- 6425 West Avenue; Castle Hills, Bexar County, Texas 78213; United States; 29°31′21″N 98°31′37″W

Information
- School type: Private, Tuition, Coeducational High School
- Motto: "Enter to learn; go forth to serve."
- Religious affiliation: Roman Catholic
- Patron saint: St. Anthony
- Established: October 11, 1964
- School district: Archdiocese of San Antonio
- Authority: Archbishop Gustavo Garcia-Siller
- CEEB code: 446122
- NCES School ID: 01322242
- Principal: Gabriel Duarte
- Grades: 9–12
- Gender: Co-ed since 1988
- Age range: 14-18
- Enrollment: 668 (2026-2026)
- Average class size: 25
- Student to teacher ratio: 14:1
- Education system: Archdiocese of San Antonio
- Language: English
- Hours in school day: 7.2
- Colors: Red, white, Columbia blue
- Slogan: “It's a great day to be an Apache."
- Athletics conference: TAPPS
- Mascot: Apaches
- Nickname: ACP
- Team name: Apaches
- Rival: Central Catholic, Incarnate Word High School
- Accreditation: Southern Association of Colleges and Schools
- Newspaper: The Tomahawk
- Yearbook: The Warrior
- Annual tuition: $13,300
- Dean of Admissions: Chris Contreras
- Athletic Director: Devlyn Lovell
- Website: antonian.org

Antonian College Preparatory High School is a co-educational Catholic high school for students grades 9 through 12. It is located in Castle Hills, Texas and is part of the Roman Catholic Archdiocese of San Antonio. It was founded by the Archdiocese in 1964 as an all-male Catholic high school run by the Brothers of the Christian Schools. The school was listed on the Cardinal Newman Society's Catholic High School Honor Roll top 50 list in 2010 and has been recognized as a National Blue Ribbon school.

== Campus ==
The Antonian campus rests on 30 acres (12 ha) in Castle Hills, Texas. It has 39 classrooms, science laboratories, kitchen, cafeteria, auditorium, technology lab, library, dance studio, and band room.

== Notable alumni ==
- Anthony Alabi, 1999, actor and former offensive tackle for the Miami Dolphins and Kansas City Chiefs
- Anatolio Benedicto Cruz III, 1976, senior vice president at USAA, former reserve deputy director, maritime operations (N04R) at U.S. Fleet Forces Command 2012-2013
- Jonathan Holmes, 2011, professional basketball player, played college basketball for the Texas Longhorns
- Henry Munoz, 1977, designer, businessman, social justice advocate, served as chairman of the National Finance Committee for the Democratic National Committee
- Justin Rodriguez, 1992, Bexar County commissioner, former Democrat representative in the Texas House, San Antonio City Council member, and Bexar County prosecutor

== Mighty Apache Band and Colorguard ==
The Mighty Apache Band and Colorguard, currently under the direction of Jared Worman, a graduate of UTSA . At TAPPS competition on Monday October 19th, 2026, Drumline earned a 3 rating in their own individual competition and the Marching Band also earned a 3.
