= William Arndt =

American gridiron football player (born 1993)

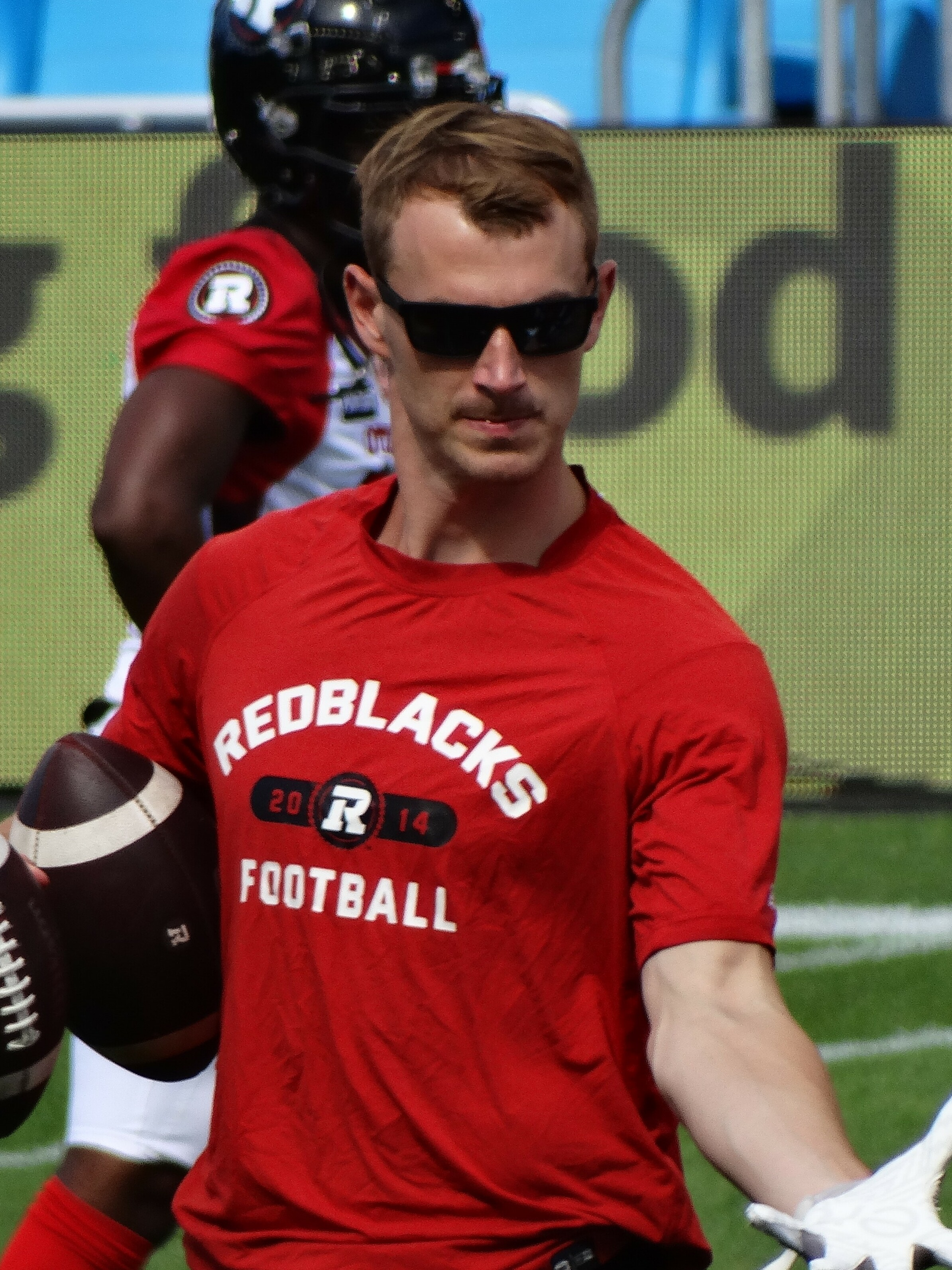
- Arndt with the Ottawa Redblacks in 2022

San Antonio Toros
- Position: Quarterback
- CFL status: American

Personal information
- Born: August 13, 1993 (age 33); Sandy Hook, Connecticut, U.S.
- Listed height: 6 ft 5 in (1.96 m)
- Listed weight: 215 lb (98 kg)

Career information
- College: Western Connecticut

Career history
- 2018–2019: Ottawa Redblacks
- 2020–2021: BC Lions*
- 2024: Albany Firebirds
- 2026–present: San Antonio Toros
- * Offseason or practice squad member only
- 2021: Edmonton Elks (offensive assistant)
- 2022: Ottawa Redblacks (quarterbacks coach)

Career CFL statistics
- Pass completions: 86
- Pass attempts: 140
- Percentage: 61.4
- TD–INT: 3–5
- Passing yards: 779
- Stats at CFL.ca

William Arndt (born August 13, 1993) is an American professional football quarterback for the San Antonio Toros of the Continental Football League. He attended Western Connecticut State University, where he played college football. Arndt made his professional debut in 2019 for the Ottawa Redblacks.

== College career ==
At the time of this graduation Arndt held multiple Western Connecticut State University records including; most passing yards in a career (7,940 yards), total offense (9,248 yards), passing touchdowns (73), and total touchdowns (91). He was named the team captain for three seasons, and was twice named to the All MASCAC Academic Team.

== Professional career ==
=== Fort McMurray Monarchs ===
In 2016, Arndt signed with the Fort McMurray Monarchs of the Alberta Football League (AFL). He led the Monarchs to the AFL championship before joining the Canadian Football League (CFL).

=== Ottawa Redblacks ===
Following his time in Western Canada Arndt signed with the Ottawa Redblacks on September 13, 2017. Arndt spent the closing three months of the season learning from the sideline. He was re-signed by the team on January 3, 2018. Arndt spent the entire 2018 season in the CFL as a backup quarterback behind Trevor Harris. For most of the 2019 season Arndt was the third sting quarterback behind Dominique Davis and Jonathan Jennings. Arndt came in relief of starting Jennings in the second half of the team's Week 15 loss to the BC Lions. As the team fell to a record of 3–11 Arndt was named the starting quarterback for the team's Week 18 match against the Toronto Argonauts. In his first career start Arndt completed 28 of 42 pass attempts for 288 yards with two passing touchdowns and three interceptions. Arndt started the following match against the division leading Ti-Cats but was unable to effectively move the ball down the field, completing 17 of 30 pass attempts for only 112 yards with no touchdowns or interceptions. Arndt made his third and final start of the season in the second last game of the season. He was released by the Redblacks on January 23, 2020.

=== BC Lions ===
Arndt signed with the BC Lions on January 30, 2020. However, he did not play in 2020 due to the cancellation of the 2020 CFL season and was then released during 2021 training camp on July 26, 2021.

=== Albany Firebirds ===
On February 24, 2024, Arndt signed with the Albany Firebirds of the Arena Football League (AFL).

=== San Antonio Caballeros ===
On February 19, 2025, Arndt signed with the San Antonio Caballeros of the International Football Alliance (IFA). However, the team folded before the start of the season.

=== San Antonio Toros ===
On January 26, 2026, Arndt signed with the San Antonio Toros of the Continental Football League. He was selected to All-CoFL Team and was named as the league MVP.

== Career statistics ==
=== CFL ===
| Year | Team | Games | | | Passing | | | | | | | | Rushing | | | |
| Year | Team | GD | GS | Record | Cmp | Att | Pct | Yds | Y/A | TD | Int | Rtg | Att | Yds | Y/A | TD |
|---|---|---|---|---|---|---|---|---|---|---|---|---|---|---|---|---|
| 2018 | OTT | 0 | 0 | — | Did not play due to injury | | | | | | | | | | | |
| 2019 | OTT | 18 | 3 | 0–3 | 103 | 165 | 62.4 | 940 | 5.7 | 3 | 6 | 68.8 | 15 | 45 | 3.0 | 0 |
| 2020 | BC | 0 | 0 | — | Season cancelled | | | | | | | | | | | |
| CFL career | | 18 | 3 | 0–3 | 103 | 165 | 62.4 | 940 | 5.7 | 3 | 6 | 68.8 | 15 | 45 | 3.0 | 0 |

=== College ===
| Season | Team | Games | | | Passing | | | | | | | | Rushing | | | |
| Season | Team | GP | GS | Record | Cmp | Att | Pct | Yds | Y/A | TD | Int | Rtg | Att | Yds | Avg | TD |
|---|---|---|---|---|---|---|---|---|---|---|---|---|---|---|---|---|
| 2011 | Western Connecticut | 10 | 7 | 0–6 | 61 | 178 | 32.3 | 550 | 3.1 | 4 | 6 | 60.9 | 62 | 201 | 3.2 | 3 |
| 2012 | Western Connecticut | 9 | 9 | 1–8 | 154 | 256 | 60.1 | 1,667 | 6.5 | 13 | 16 | 119.1 | 62 | 66 | 1.1 | 0 |
| 2013 | Western Connecticut | 10 | 10 | 8−2 | 141 | 228 | 61.8 | 1,757 | 7.7 | 13 | 7 | 139.3 | 83 | 520 | 6.3 | 9 |
| 2014 | Western Connecticut | 4 | 4 | 2−2 | 70 | 109 | 64.2 | 935 | 8.6 | 11 | 4 | 162.2 | 23 | 42 | 1.8 | 0 |
| 2015 | Western Connecticut | 10 | 10 | 5−5 | 208 | 332 | 62.7 | 3,012 | 9.1 | 32 | 5 | 167.7 | 92 | 374 | 4.1 | 5 |
| Career | | 43 | 40 | 16−23 | 634 | 1,103 | 57.5 | 7,921 | 7.2 | 73 | 38 | 132.5 | 322 | 1,203 | 3.7 | 17 |

- On 10/1/11 Arndt started at WR against Rowan University.
- Arndt's start on 11/10/12 against William Paterson is not included in his official career statistics by the university or other sources. However, his statistics from that game are included here. In that game, he completed 14 of 29 passes for 160 yards and one touchdown and one interception with 13 rushes for 22 yards. (November 10, 2012).

== Coaching career ==
Arndt retired following his release by the BC Lions, and joined the Edmonton Elks as an offensive assistant on September 1, 2021. Arndt joined the Ottawa Redblacks as a quarterback coach in advance of the 2022 season. Following the season, in December 2022, Arndt announced that he was stepping down from his role as quarterbacks coach in order to pursue a playing opportunity.

== Personal life ==
Arndt portrayed Penn State play-caller Matt McGloin in the HBO movie Paterno, which was released in early April 2018.
