= Anatolio B. Cruz =

Anatolio B. Cruz III
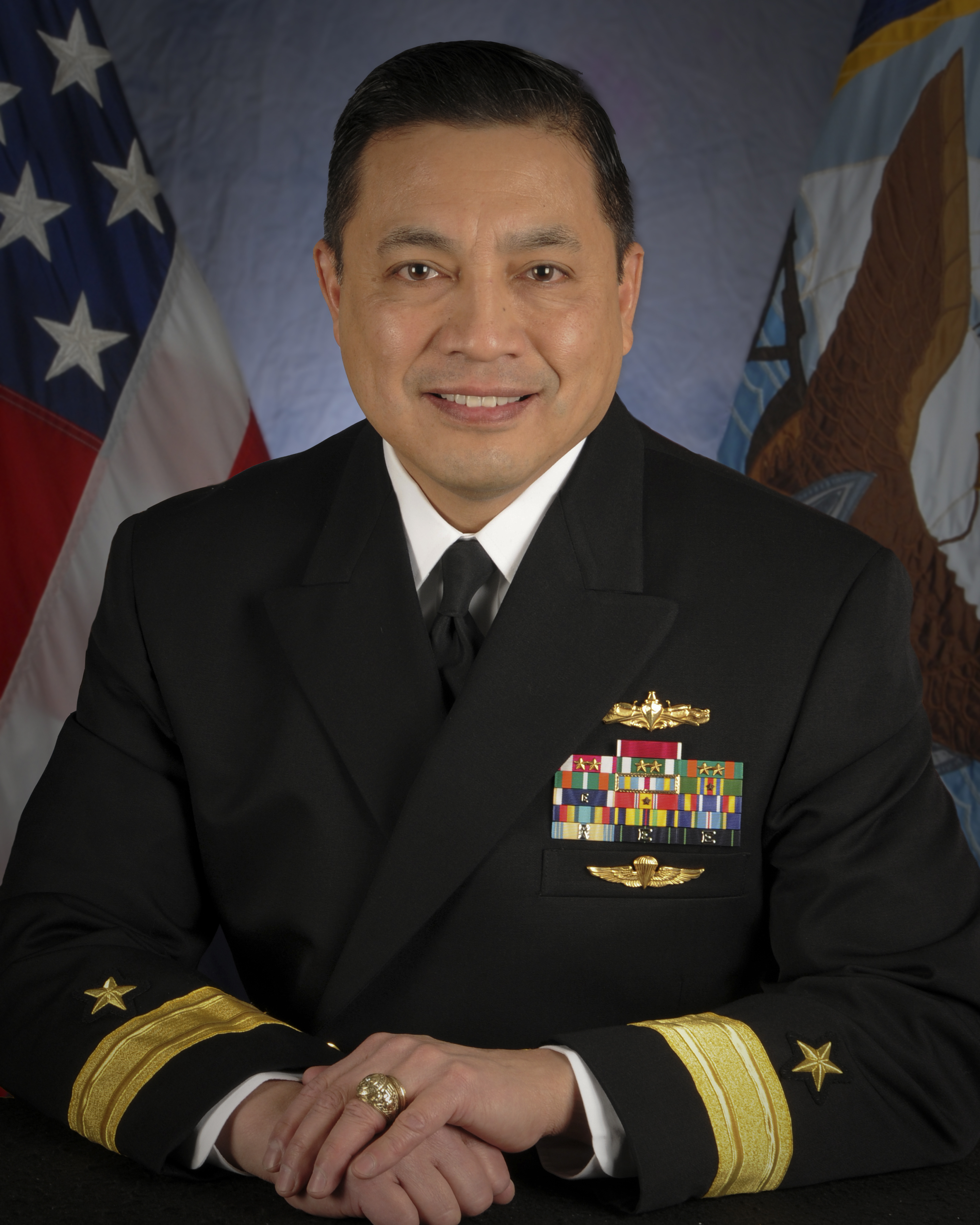
- Born: Anatolio Benedicto Cruz III; June 16, 1958 (age 68); Minneapolis, Minnesota
- Education: United States Naval Academy (B.S.); University of Maryland (M.B.A.); Catholic University of America (J.D.)
- Military career
- Allegiance: United States
- Branch: United States Navy
- Service years: 1980-2013
- Rank: Rear Admiral
- Unit: see below

Anatolio Benedicto ("A.B.") Cruz III (born June 16, 1958, in Minneapolis, Minnesota) is a retired navy admiral and former senior vice president, Enterprise Shared Services, and general counsel of USAA. He was previously the reserve deputy director, maritime operations (N04R) at U.S. Fleet Forces Command.

== Early life and education ==
Cruz was raised in San Antonio, where he graduated from Antonian College Preparatory High School. He graduated from the U.S. Naval Academy in 1980. He reported aboard USS Gray (FF-1054) and during his tour served as electronic materials officer, auxiliary-repair-electrical officer, damage control assistant, and acting engineering department head. In 1982, he was awarded the Commander-in-Chief Pacific Fleet's Shiphandler-of-the-Year Award. In 1984, he joined the staff at the U.S. Naval Academy and served as an admissions officer and congressional liaison officer. In 1986, he accepted a commission in the U.S. Navy Reserve.

Cruz holds a master's degree in marketing from the University of Maryland and a juris doctor degree from the Columbus School of Law at The Catholic University of America.

== Career ==
Cruz's first assignment as a flag officer was as deputy commander, U.S. Naval Forces Southern Command and deputy commander, U.S. 4th Fleet in Mayport, Fla.

He has also held numerous operational and staff positions in the special operations and special warfare areas, including multiple tours of duty within the Navy Expeditionary Combat Enterprise and Naval Special Warfare community. His six command tours were with Navy Region Southwest Reserve Component Command; Navy Reserve (NR) Navy Expeditionary Combat Command; NR Naval Inspector General 106; Harbor Defense Command 207; NR Naval Special Warfare Unit 2; and, Mobile Inshore Undersea Warfare Unit 206. Other assignments included tours with Naval Special Warfare Group 2; Naval Coastal Warfare Group 2; Mobile Inshore Undersea Warfare Unit 210; and, Naval Inshore Undersea Warfare Group 2.

He retired from the Navy on October 1, 2013.

== Awards ==
His personal decorations include the Legion of Merit (3 awards), the Meritorious Service Medal (3 awards), the Navy and Marine Corps Commendation Medal (3 awards), and the Navy and Marine Corps Achievement Medal (3 awards). He is a qualified advanced military parachutist (gold wings) and basic diver.
