= Lemuel Stinson =

American football player (born 1966)

No. 32
- Position: Cornerback

Personal information
- Born: May 10, 1966 (age 60); Houston, Texas, U.S.
- Listed height: 5 ft 9 in (1.75 m)
- Listed weight: 159 lb (72 kg)

Career information
- High school: Worthing (Houston)
- College: Texas Tech
- NFL draft: 1988: 6th round, 161st overall pick

Career history
- Chicago Bears (1988–1992); Atlanta Falcons (1993); Indianapolis Colts (1997)*
- * Offseason or practice squad member only

Career NFL statistics
- Interceptions: 16
- INT return yards: 240
- Touchdowns: 2
- Stats at Pro Football Reference

Lemuel Dale Stinson (born May 10, 1966) is an American former professional football player who was a cornerback in the National Football League (NFL). He played college football for the Texas Tech Red Raiders.

Stinson was born in Houston, Texas, where he graduated from Worthing High School. Stinson played in the NFL for six seasons, from 1988 to 1993. He played college football at Texas Tech University for three seasons (1984, 85, 87) as a receiver and cornerback. While at Texas Tech, he also competed in track and field as a hurdler.

Pre-draft measurables
Height	Weight	Hand span	40-yard dash	10-yard split	20-yard split	20-yard shuttle	Vertical jump
5 ft 9 3/8 in (1.76 m)	165 lb (75 kg)	9 in (0.23 m)	4.54 s	1.55 s	2.60 s	4.27 s	37.0 in (0.94 m)
All values from NFL Combine

Stinson was selected in the sixth round of the 1988 NFL draft by the Chicago Bears, where he played until briefly joining the Atlanta Falcons in 1993, his final season.

While at Texas Tech, he became a member of the Alpha Phi Alpha fraternity.

During the 2025 season, Stinson served as the safeties coach for the Souther Jaguars football team. In 2026, he joined the Tall City Black Gold of the revived Continental Football League as the defensive coordinator.
