= Castle Hills, Texas =

City in Bexar County, Texas, United States

- City
- Location of Castle Hills, Texas
- Coordinates: 29°31′18″N 98°31′0″W
- Country: United States
- State: Texas
- County: Bexar

Area
  - Total: 2.47 sq mi (6.40 km^{2})
  - Land: 2.47 sq mi (6.40 km^{2})
  - Water: 0 sq mi (0.00 km^{2})
- Elevation: 840 ft (260 m)

Population (2020)
  - Total: 3,978
  - Density: 1,810.3/sq mi (698.97/km^{2})
- Time zone: UTC-6 (Central (CST))
  - Summer (DST): UTC-5 (CDT)
- ZIP code: 78213
- Area codes: 210, 726
- FIPS code: 48-13276
- GNIS feature ID: 1332298
- Website: http://www.cityofcastlehills.com/

Castle Hills is an enclave city located in northern Bexar County, Texas, United States. As of the 2020 census, the city had a total population of 3,978. It is surrounded by the city of San Antonio.

== Geography ==
Castle Hills is located at 29°31'18" North, 98°30'60" West (29.521762, –98.516601). The town borders Uptown San Antonio to the west and is approximately seven miles (10 miles' driving distance) north of Downtown San Antonio.

According to the United States Census Bureau, the city has a total area of 2.5 square miles (6.5 km^{2}), of which 2.5 square miles (6.5 km^{2}) all land.

Castle Hills is an independent municipality, completely surrounded by the city of San Antonio. It is bisected into a northern and southern half by interstate highway loop I-410. It is located at the southern end of Northwest Military Highway, the northern end being located at U.S. Army Camp Bullis.

== Climate ==
The climate in this area is characterized by hot, humid summers and generally mild to cool winters. According to the Köppen Climate Classification system, Castle Hills has a humid subtropical climate, abbreviated "Cfa" on climate maps.

== Demographics ==
Historical population
Census	Pop.	Note	%±
1960	2,622		—
1970	5,311		102.6%
1980	4,773		−10.1%
1990	4,198		−12.0%
2000	4,202		0.1%
2010	4,116		−2.0%
2020	3,978		−3.4%
U.S. Decennial Census

=== 2020 census ===
As of the 2020 census, there were 3,978 people, 1,516 households, and 1,106 families residing in Castle Hills. The median age was 48.4 years; 19.5% of residents were under the age of 18 and 25.5% of residents were 65 years of age or older. For every 100 females there were 96.1 males, and for every 100 females age 18 and over there were 94.4 males age 18 and over.

100.0% of residents lived in urban areas, while 0% lived in rural areas.

Of the 1,516 households in Castle Hills, 30.5% had children under the age of 18 living in them. Of all households, 59.4% were married-couple households, 14.5% were households with a male householder and no spouse or partner present, and 21.6% were households with a female householder and no spouse or partner present. About 20.4% of all households were made up of individuals and 12.6% had someone living alone who was 65 years of age or older.

There were 1,847 housing units, of which 17.9% were vacant. Among occupied housing units, 88.9% were owner-occupied and 11.1% were renter-occupied. The homeowner vacancy rate was 1.4% and the rental vacancy rate was 29.8%.

Racial composition as of the 2020 census
Race	Percent
White	58.7%
Black or African American	1.6%
American Indian and Alaska Native	0.4%
Asian	2.0%
Native Hawaiian and Other Pacific Islander	0.1%
Some other race	8.3%
Two or more races	28.9%
Hispanic or Latino (of any race)	47.4%

=== 2010 census ===
As of the census of 2010, there were 4,116 people, 1,887 households, and 1,124 families residing in the city. There were 2,047 housing units. The racial makeup of the city was 90.5% White, 1.0% African American, 0.3% Native American, 1.7% Asian, 4.8% from other races, and 1.7% from two or more races. 38.9% of the population were Hispanic or Latino of any race, with the majority being Mexican American.

There were 1,877 households, out of which 18.0% had children under the age of 18 living with them, 49.0% were married couples living together, 7.8% had a female householder with no husband present, and 40.4% were non-families. 35.8% of all households were made up of individuals, and 26.3% had someone living alone who was 65 years of age or older. The average household size was 2.18 and the average family size was 2.83.

In the city, the population was spread out, with 17.1% under the age of 18, 4.8% from 18 to 24, 15.2% from 25 to 44, 30.0% from 45 to 64, and 32.8% who were 65 years of age or older. The median age was 54 years.

The median income for a household in the city was $69,637, and the median income for a family was $104,716. Males had a median income of $59,911 versus $36,676 for females. The per capita income for the city was $49,137. 5.9% of the population and 4.2% of families were below the poverty line. Out of the total population, none of those under the age of 18 and 11.8% of those 65 and older were living below the poverty line.

== Education ==
The city is served by North East Independent School District.

Zoned schools are as follows: Two elementary schools, Castle Hills Elementary School and Jackson Keller Elementary School, are within the city limits and serve portions of the city. Jackson Middle School in San Antonio serves a portion of Castle Hills, while Nimitz Middle School in San Antonio serves a portion of Castle Hills, LEE High School serves all of Castle Hills. The LEE High School campus also encompasses the International School of the Americas (ISA), North East School of the Arts (NESA) and grades 6–12 of STEM Academy Private schools include Antonian College Preparatory High School, St. George Episcopal School, and The Christian School at Castle Hills.

== City government ==
The City of Castle Hills is served by five Alderpersons: Joe Izbrand, Frank Paul, Kurt May, Jack Joyce, and Beth Daines, all elected by the people of Castle Hills, as well as the Mayor of Castle Hills, JR Treviño. The Mayor cannot vote, but does play a deciding role on many issues.

Castle Hills has its own 911 Dispatch as well as Police, Fire, and Public Works departments. The Fire Department is a First Responder organization staffed with Firefighter/EMT(Basic and Paramedics). Acadian Ambulance Service is the EMS provider for City of Castle Hills. Castle Hills Fire Departments responds with Acadian EMS to all Fire and EMS calls.

Drinking water is provided to residents of the city by the San Antonio Water System. Most of the properties in Castle Hills are single family residences.

== Parks and recreation ==
The Commons at Castle Hills, a recreational area, opened in 2003. It hosts recreational activities, and is between the fire station and city hall.

Also located within Castle Hills is the McGimsey Boy Scout Camp, a 140-acre (0.57 km^{2}) park for BSA use.

== See also ==
- List of municipalities in Texas
