= Stan Bedwell =

American football coach and former quarterback

San Antonio Toros
- Title: Head coach / general manager

Personal information
- Born: Nashville, Arkansas, U.S.

Career information
- High school: Mineral Springs High School
- College: Trinity Bible College

Career history
- Northland Community & Technical College (2011) Offensive coordinator; Rochester Community and Technical College (2012) Offensive coordinator; North Dakota State College of Science Offensive coordinator; Belhaven University Running backs coach; Hämeenlinna Huskies (2017) Head coach; Allgäu Comets (2018) Head coach; Bucharest Rebels (2019) Offensive coordinator; Manchester University (2020) Co-offensive coordinator; TSL Linemen (2021) Offensive coordinator / quarterback; Ohio Valley Ironmen (2024) Quarterback coach; San Antonio Toros (2025–present) Head coach / general manager

Awards and highlights
- European Football Hall of Fame (2013); Three European national championships as a player

Stan Bedwell is an American football coach and former quarterback. He is known for his playing and coaching career in Europe and the United States and for his association with the Air raid offense. He has coached at the collegiate and professional levels and served as a player-coach for The Spring League's TSL Linemen.

== Early life and education ==
Bedwell is from Nashville, Arkansas. He attended Mineral Springs High School and played college football at Trinity Bible College in North Dakota. He later earned All-Upper Midwest Athletic Conference honors.

== Playing career ==
Bedwell began his professional playing career in Europe in 2006. He played for teams in several countries, including Germany, Italy, Finland, Serbia, Romania, Spain, Switzerland and Denmark.

Bedwell became known for his use of the Air Raid offense. He was inducted into the European Football Hall of Fame in 2013. He recorded more than 27,300 passing yards and 343 touchdowns, earned eight Most Valuable Player awards and won three European national championships.

In 2021, Bedwell joined The Spring League's TSL Linemen as a player-coach, working with head coach Hal Mumme. The team won the league championship.

== Coaching career ==
=== College football ===
Bedwell served as offensive coordinator at Northland Community & Technical College in Minnesota in 2011. The team won its Northern Division championship, and its offense averaged 303 passing yards per game.

In 2012, Bedwell became offensive coordinator at Rochester Community and Technical College in Rochester, Minnesota. The Yellowjackets finished with a 10–1 record and won the Minnesota College Athletic Conference championship.

He later served as offensive coordinator at North Dakota State College of Science and joined the coaching staff at Belhaven University in Jackson, Mississippi, where he worked with the running backs.

Bedwell subsequently coached at Manchester University in Indiana, working with the program's quarterbacks and offense.

=== European coaching career ===
Bedwell coached several American football teams in Europe, serving in roles that included head coach, offensive coordinator and quarterback. His career included teams in Finland, Germany, Italy, Romania, Serbia and Switzerland.

In 2017, Bedwell coached the Hämeenlinna Huskies in Finland's Maple League. In 2018, he became head coach of the Allgäu Comets of the German Football League. He and his coaching staff left the team during the 2018 season after reported philosophical differences with the organization.

Bedwell subsequently joined the Bucharest Rebels in Romania as quarterback and offensive coordinator. He also coached the Lazio Marines in Italy, where the team won its division championship, according to Belhaven University.

During his time in Europe, Bedwell accumulated a 92–25 record and won 5 championships.

=== The Spring League ===
In 2021, Bedwell served as offensive coordinator and quarterback for The Spring League's TSL Linemen. He worked with Hal Mumme, a coach associated with the development and popularization of the Air Raid offense. The Linemen won the league championship, and Bedwell's dual role drew attention to his international playing career.

=== San Antonio Toros ===
In December 2025, the San Antonio Toros announced Bedwell's appointment as general manager and offensive coordinator. After head coach Ronnie Vinklarek took a position coach job with Columbus Aviators Bedwell was subsequently appointed as the head coach and general manager. Among his notable assistants is former NFL and college head coach Jerry Glanville, who had originally been hired as defensive coordinator under Vinklarek and stayed in that position with Bedwell.

== Coaching philosophy ==
Bedwell is associated with the Air Raid offense, a pass-oriented offensive system that emphasizes spread formations and quarterback decision-making. His experience as a player in Europe influenced his coaching approach in both American college football and international professional leagues. He has also worked with Hal Mumme, whose offensive system influenced Bedwell's playing career.
