= Continental Football League (2026) =

Upcoming American football league

- Current season, competition or edition: 2026 CoFL season
- Sport: Gridiron football
- Founded: 2025
- First season: 2026
- CEO: Manny Matsakis
- No. of teams: 6
- Country: United States
- Headquarters: Westfield, Indiana
- Most recent champion: San Antonio Toros
- Most titles: San Antonio Toros (1)
- Broadcaster: YouTube
- Related competitions: International Football Alliance
- Website: www.coflfootball.com

The Continental Football League (CoFL) is a professional gridiron football minor league that launched in the summer of 2026. It is a revival of the original Continental Football League that operated from 1965 to 1969, with no direct organizational lineage from that league. Its current membership of four teams (three permanent members and one affiliate) are all located in Texas, having previously and unsuccessfully attempted to launch a northern division in and surrounding Ohio.

The new CoFL is positioned as a third tier (Note: Behind the first-tier National Football League and second-tier United Football League) minor professional league (similar to MiLB class AA, the ECHL, or USL League One), aimed at smaller markets and providing opportunities for overlooked talent, playing under a hybrid of American football and Canadian football rules.

== Premise ==
The CoFL sees itself as complementary to leagues like the UFL, rather than a direct competitor, and intends to work within the broader alt-football ecosystem rather than challenge it. The league aims to fill a strategic summer football gap, offering competitive professional football outside of the NFL and UFL calendar. Its mission includes:

- Developing players, coaches, and staff for higher levels of professional football
- Reviving community-based pro sports through local ownership and civic pride
- Avoiding financial pitfalls by prioritizing sustainable spending and long-term viability

The league plan to be a launch pad to younger players, and it does not plan on providing experienced talent a place to continue their pro career, with league commissioner Mike Kelly describing such players as "mercenaries."

== History ==
=== Original CoFL (1965–1969) ===
The original Continental Football League operated as a minor professional league during the late 1960s, with teams across the United States, Canada and Mexico. It disbanded after the 1969 season, with its eastern teams merging into the Atlantic Coast Football League and select constituent teams and conferences such as the Trans-American Football League continuing into the early 1970s.

=== Revival (2025–2026) ===
During summer 2025, Manny Matsakis, a fan of the original Ohio Valley Ironmen of the original Continental Football League, launched a revival of the team. It initially played in the International Football Alliance before multiple issues with that league led to a collapse early in its inaugural season. The revived Ironmen dominated its competition in its abbreviated 2025 season, which eventually led to the team's schedule being cut short after three games. Compared to many of its erstwhile IFA rivals, the Ironmen were relatively well-operated, with no known financial issues and its own television contract with local broadcast station WTRF.

On September 9, 2025, the Ironmen announced the relaunch of the Continental Football League, with former Winnipeg Blue Bombers head coach Mike Kelly named as commissioner. Kelly, like Matsakis, had been a fan of the original league, in Kelly's case the Waterbury Orbits. The new league is headquartered in Wheeling, West Virginia, and plans to emphasize community ownership, grassroots operations, and summer scheduling to avoid competition with the NFL and other fall football leagues. The Ironmen were the first members of the league announced. The Cincinnati Dukes, a semi-pro team that had existed since 2012 and had played against the Ironmen in 2025, agreed to join the new league.

In Texas, the new teams consisted of the Tall City Black Gold in Midland, the Texas Syndicate in Pflugerville (a suburb of Austin), and the San Antonio Toros. Like the Ironmen, the Toros marketed themselves as a revival of the 1960s franchise of the same name, including adopting the Toros' approach of using multiple home stadiums (one being a former Toros home, Harlandale Stadium). Its timing took advantage of the cancellation of the San Antonio Brahmas in the UFL. The fourth franchise was originally proposed for San Angelo, then Fort Worth, in the latter case reviving the previous CoFL Fort Worth Braves. Prior to the season, the Braves players were assigned to the roster of the existing semi-pro squad the Tennessee Hornets for a preseason game; after the Hornets were annihilated 71-0 in that contest, the plans for the Braves franchise were cancelled.

The league attempted to add two additional franchises in the north. In Michigan, the league attempted to capitalize on the loss of the Michigan Panthers by hiring Panthers general manager Steve Kazor to helm a team reviving the Michigan Arrows brand. Hal Mumme was hired to coach a revival of the Indianapolis Capitols. After a "comprehensive review" of the Capitols' ownership structure, the COFL suspended the team's operations shortly before the regular season. In Michigan, a lack of a usable stadium—the same problem that led to the Panthers' demise— and tensions between Kazor, Arrows owner Mike Jones, and the league office forced the abandonment of plans for the Arrows, who had announced plans to play on the campus of Siena Heights University, which was not only in a rural area 73 miles (117 km) from its intended home city of Detroit, but had already permanently closed. The league initially announced a plan to field a traveling team variously named the Norfolk Neptunes and Vegas Gamblers to fill the Ironmen's schedule holes, but this team never formed.

On June 19, 2026, the league announced that its flagship franchise the Ironmen had folded due to a sponsor withdrawing the team's funding; its social media and Web site were pulled offline the same day. Matsakis had indicated even before the team's failure that the Ironmen had been hampered by the Arrows and Capitols failing before launch, and the continuing unwillingness of other teams in the region to play against the Ironmen. Ironmen punter and YouTuber Isaac Parks released a video essay describing the Ironmen's two seasons, noting that financial problems had become evident early in the second season, tied to the aforementioned scheduling and sponsorship issues that Parks confirmed; Parks also stated that Matsakis had lost substantial money subsidizing the Capitols', Arrows' and Neptunes' failed launches. Though the league's operations ran through the Ironmen with Matsakis as the league's CEO, the Texas teams continued to play that weekend's games, while the Dukes had no further league games scheduled.

San Antonio opted not to play its final scheduled game against the Texas Herd, citing the Herd's much smaller roster count, its status as a non-league schedule filler, and the safety concerns that this fact posed. In a postseason interview with KTKR, the Toros owner Josh Mair indicated that the team and the league's Texas division planned on returning in 2027, noting that Tall City and the Texas Syndicate were both financially sound. The Toros were named champions following the end of the season, as commissioner Mike Kelly resigned his position; Matsakis will assume charge of the league office.

After the season, the CoFL hired a chief of staff and announced that it would build an infrastructure to support eight teams for the 2027 season, with plans to eventually expand to 24 teams across four divisions within five years. The league's headquarters will be based in Indianapolis. In July 2026, the league announced it had approved a second attempt to launch the Indianapolis Capitols for the 2027 season with a different owner. Mike Vanderjagt was hired to serve as the Caps' coach. The Indy Bison, Indianapolis's existing minor professional football squad which had played games against the Dukes in 2026, announced its move to American Indoor Football to clear space for the Capitols. A Milwaukee franchise was unveiled September 16, 2026, which will be the last expansion team to be announced for the 2027 season, with Gilbert Brown as its head coach.

== Teams ==
Division	Team	Location	Stadium	Capacity	Founded	Joined	Head coach
North Division	Cincinnati Dukes	Mason, Ohio	Mason High School	7,000	2012	2026	Daryl "Slash" Moore
North Division	Indianapolis Capitols	Westfield, Indiana	Grand Park Sports Campus	5,000	2026	2027	Mike Vanderjagt
North Division	Milwaukee Silverbacks	Milwaukee, Wisconsin	TBA	TBA	2026	2027	Gilbert Brown
South Division	San Antonio Toros	San Antonio, Texas	Wheatley Heights Sports Complex	3,500	2026	2026	Stan Bedwell
South Division	Tall City Black Gold	Midland, Texas	Astound Broadband Stadium	15,000	2026	2026	Rodney Blackshear
South Division	Texas Syndicate	Pflugerville, Texas	The Pfield	10,000	2026	2026	Mike Olvera, Jr.

=== Former teams ===
Team	Location	Founded	Folded	Notes
Ft. Worth Braves	Fort Worth, Texas	2026	2026	Folded before the start of the season
Michigan Arrows	Detroit, Michigan	2026	2026	Folded before the start of the season
Norfolk Neptunes	Norfolk, Virginia	2026	2026	Traveling team created to fill openings in the North Division, never fielded a team
Ohio Valley Ironmen	Martins Ferry, Ohio	2025	2026	Folded in week 4 after playing one game
Texas Herd	Longview, Texas	2025	2026	Affiliate team brought in to replace the Ft. Worth Braves

=== Map of teams ===
North Division (Blue), South Division (Red).

== Players ==
The CoFL will implement a structured and sustainable approach to roster management, aiming to ensure competitive balance and long-term player development across all franchises.

Each team is allowed to invite up to 50 players to training camp. Of these, at least 25 players must be between the ages of 18 and 25. This policy is designed to encourage youth participation and the development of emerging talent rather than overreliance on veteran players. The league plan to attract student-athletes who entered the NCAA transfer portal but couldn't find new opportunities and allow them to be seen by pro scouts or return to the NCAA.

Following training camp, team rosters are trimmed to a 36-player active roster and 4 additional practice squad members. The system mirrors professional roster structures while allowing smaller-market teams to manage player expenses responsibly.

=== Local player rule ===
Every CoFL franchise must include at least five local athletes on its final roster. Eligible players are defined as those who either played high school or small-college football within the team’s home region. The rule aims to strengthen community ties and foster fan loyalty through local representation, as each franchise will be granted exclusive regional rights to players from nearby FBS, FCS, and small college programs.

== Schedule ==
The league's schedule began on Memorial Day weekend with a slate of exhibition games against non-league opponents. Following that, a six-week regular season will follow. The South Division, having a full contingent of four teams, will see each member team play the other three teams twice in a home-and-away series, while the two surviving North Division teams were to play each other in a home-and-home, each were to host the Neptunes at home (fulfilling the Arrows' away dates) and used semi-pro teams, mostly from the Midwest Developmental Football League, to fill out the remainder of their schedule:

Week 0
Preseason versus non-league opponents (May 23 to 25)
Weeks 1-6
Regular season (May 30 to July 5)
Week 7
Divisional Playoff games (#1 seed versus #2 seed) (~July 11)
Week 8
Continental Cup (North Champion vs South Champion) at Grand Park Sports Complex in Indianapolis (~July 18)

Due to the collapse of the North Division, the playoffs were never played and the championship was declared based on regular season record.

== Rules ==
The CoFL plays under a hybrid of American football and Canadian football rules:

- First half: Based on NFL rules, using standard 11-on-11 outdoor football
- Second half: in what the league describes as "The Continental Divide," the game will shift to Canadian football rules, except with 11 men continuing to play on each side and field dimensions remaining the same: three downs, unlimited forward motion, the single, a one-yard neutral zone, play clock shifting to 20 seconds from the spotting of the ball, and no fair catch.
  - In addition to the Canadian rules, the COFL includes a rule unique to its league during the Continental Divide: the Los Dos, in which a ball can be punted from any point on the field and score two points if it goes through the uprights.

During its inaugural season, these rule changes—then billed as the Continental Shift—were only implemented in the fourth quarter, before evenly splitting the rule change between halves in 2027. The reason behind the adoption of Canadian rules is to give Canadian Football League scouts an opportunity to "evaluate the skill sets that suit their style of play", and comes after CFL commissioner Stewart Johnston announced the elimination or reduction of many of the rules unique to that code beginning with its own 2026 CFL season.

== Ownership and model and league finances ==
On September 11, 2025 commissioner Mike Kelly revealed that the CoFL blueprint for its 2026 season:

- Each team operates as its own business entity with its own ownership group, as opposed to the more common professional spring model of all teams operating as a single entity. The CoFL plans to offer fan ownership via equity crowdfunding, registered with the U.S. Securities and Exchange Commission (SEC), similar to the way the Green Bay Packers or some Canadian Football League teams operate.
- The league initially planned to target smaller cities, with approximately 100,000 or less in population, playing in stadiums with 5,000 to 10,000 seats. As of February 2026, the only teams that fit this description are Ohio Valley and Tall City; the other six reside in metropolitan areas that host at least one team in an American major professional league, with three of those areas having previously hosted UFL teams (and one sharing a market with a UFL team). Five of the eight teams are located in cities that previously hosted teams in the 1960s CoFL, with all four reviving the names of their 1960s counterparts.
- Diverse revenue streams: the league target attendance for profitability is an average of 3,000 fans, which will account for only part of the revenue, while the rest will come from concessions (including alcohol sales), merchandise and local sponsorships and TV deals.
- The business model is built around cost control, regional engagement, and player development, similar to minor league baseball or hockey systems.

=== Headquarters ===
The league’s national headquarters is based in Wheeling, West Virginia, where it also has its first franchise (Ohio Valley Ironmen). City officials and league leaders have described the headquarters decision as a strategic move to reinvest in a region with a rich football legacy. After the 2026 season, the league moved its headquarters to Indianapolis.

== Media ==
For the 2026 season, the COFL had all of its games streamed on YouTube via the United Football Media channel. For 2027, the league will handle all of its streaming content in-house.
