= The Christian School at Castle Hills =

Location
- Castle Hills, Texas; United States
- Coordinates: 29°32′10″N 98°31′31″W

Information
- Type: Private Christian
- Religious affiliation: Baptist
- Established: 1981
- Superintendent: Michael Pinkston
- Faculty: 101
- Grades: Preschool–12th Grade
- Enrollment: 675 in Preschool, Elementary, Intermediate, Middle School and High School
- Average class size: 15–22 students
- Student to teacher ratio: 8:1
- Campus: 20 acres (81,000 m^{2})
- Colors: Blue, Gold, White
- Athletics: Volleyball, Cross Country, Football, Basketball, Swimming, Tennis, Track & Field, Golf, Soccer, Cheerleading
- Athletics conference: TAPPS
- Mascot: Eagle
- Website: castlehills.school

The Christian School at Castle Hills, formerly Castle Hills First Baptist Schools, is a private Christian school located in Castle Hills, Texas. It is accredited by the Association of Christian Schools International. The Christian School at Castle Hills serves approximately 600 students from preschool to 12th grade.

== History ==
Castle Hills First Baptist School was founded in 1981 by Pastor George H. Harris and several members of Castle Hills First Baptist Church. The school initially served kindergarten through 6th grade, with an enrollment of about 100 students. In 2020, there were approximately 650 students enrolled from preschool (6 weeks) through the 12th grade. In 2016, The Christian School at Castle Hills severed its association with Castle Hills First Baptist Church, becoming an independent Christian school and changing its name to "The Christian School at Castle Hills".

== Athletics ==
Castle Hills has received multiple Texas Association of Private and Parochial Schools Division 4A Awards. The first of these was the boys soccer program in the 1997–1998 season. Other awards include two state championships for boys varsity volleyball in the early 2000s.

== Fine Arts ==
The Castle Hills secondary choir received back-to-back state titles in 2010 and 2011.

== Notable alumni ==
- Matt Krause (Class of 1998), Republican member of the Texas House of Representatives, from District 93 in Fort Worth
