= Mike Kelly (gridiron football coach, born 1958) =

American gridiron football player, coach, scout, and executive

Biographical details
- Born: February 11, 1958 (age 68); Waterbury, Connecticut, U.S.

Playing career
- 1976–1979: Bluffton
- Position: Quarterback

Coaching career (HC unless noted)
- 1980–1981: Ridgedale HS (OH) (RB/S)
- 1982: Edinboro (WR)
- 1983–1985: Marietta (RB)
- 1986: Ohio Wesleyan (OC)
- 1987–1989: Capital (OC)
- 1990–1991: San Francisco State (associate HC)
- 1992–1996: Winnipeg Blue Bombers (OC)
- 1997–1999: Valdosta State
- 2001: Orlando Rage (OC)
- 2002: Philadelphia Eagles (OA/QC)
- 2008: Edmonton Eskimos (WR)
- 2009: Winnipeg Blue Bombers
- 2014–2018: Widener

Administrative career (AD unless noted)
- 2001: Philadelphia Eagles (advance scout)
- 2003–2005: Washington Redskins (pro pers. asst.)
- 2009: Winnipeg Blue Bombers (GM)
- 2026: Continental Football League (commish.)

Head coaching record
- Overall: 50–35 (college); 7–11 (CFL)
- Tournaments: 2–1 (NCAA D-III playoffs)

Accomplishments and honors

Championships
- 1 MAC (2014)

Awards
- MAC Coach of the Year (2014); ECAC South Region Co-Coach of the Year (2014)

Mike Kelly (born February 11, 1958) is an American gridiron football coach and former player, scout, and executive. He served as the head football coach at Valdosta State University in Valdosta, Georgia from 1997 to 1999 and Widener University in Chester, Pennsylvania from 2014 to 2018. In 2009, Kelly was the head coach and general manager for the Winnipeg Blue Bombers of the Canadian Football League (CFL). He has worked as an assistant coach at the high school football level, for several college football teams, and for professional teams in the CFL, XFL, and the National Football League (NFL). Kelly played college football as a quarterback at Bluffton College—now Bluffton University—in the late 1970s. Kelly was the inaugural commissioner of the 2026 revival of the Continental Football League.

== Playing career and education ==
Kelly was born on February 11, 1958, in Waterbury, Connecticut. He graduated from Muncie Northside High School in Muncie, Indiana in 1976, where as a senior he set a school record for passes attempted and completed in a single season. In 1996, Kelly was inducted into the Delaware County, Indiana Athletic Hall of Fame. Kelly's father was a high school football coach in Waterbury, Connecticut.

Kelly played quarterback for Bluffton College—now known as Bluffton University—in Bluffton, Ohio from 1976 to 1979 and earned his bachelor's degree in health, physical education and recreation. When he graduated, Kelly ranked third in career completions (95), fourth in career attempts (242) and fifth in career passing yardage (1,028). He was just the sixth player in BC history to pass for over 1,000 yards. In 2002, Kelly was inducted into the Bluffton College Hall of Fame.

== Coaching career ==
Kelly was the offensive play-caller with the Winnipeg Blue Bombers between 1992 and 1996, as part of the teams that captured three regular season division titles and appeared in the Grey Cup twice. Kelly's offence set 29 club records during his tenure in Winnipeg, including Matt Dunigan's record 713 yards passing in a game.

Kelly was the head coach at Valdosta State University from 1997 to 1999. In his three seasons there, Kelly coached 23 players to all-conference honours and had two players earn All-American status and four more recruited players later achieving All-American status. Kelly's Valdosta State teams set 13 school records during his tenure. Kelly was fired nine games into the 1999 season and replaced by assistant Mark Nelson, who was appointed interim head coach.

In 2000, Kelly was the offensive coordinator/quarterbacks coach for the Orlando Rage of the XFL. The Rage went a league best 8–2 during that season, winning the Eastern Division. Kelly's offence led the league in red zone scoring percentage, with quarterback Jeff Brohm named First-Team All-XFL.

Kelly spent five years in the National Football League (NFL) working as an advanced pro scout for the Washington Redskins and Philadelphia Eagles where he also was an offensive assistant/quality control. During his time with the Eagles, while working alongside head coach Andy Reid, the club won two NFC East championships, while Kelly also coached in the 2003 Pro Bowl.

In 2008 Kelly was the receivers coach for the Edmonton Eskimos. Quarterback Ricky Ray had a personal best 5,600 yards passing while slot receivers Kamau Peterson caught over 100 passes and was named Most Outstanding Canadian Player and Kelly Campbell led the CFL averaging 23.7 yards per reception.

Kelly served as the head coach of the Winnipeg Blue Bombers in 2009. Kelly also coordinated the offense for half of the season, in which the team went 7–11 missing a home playoff berth by a single game. On December 17, 2009, Kelly was arrested in Bridgeport, Pennsylvania and charged with assault and harassment following a domestic dispute at his home. Kelly was fired from his post with Winnipeg later that day. Ken Hildahl, chairman of the Blue Bombers, indicated that Kelly's dismissal was due to the performance of the team, not the incident earlier that day. The charges were dropped after Kelly took anger management counseling.

In his first season with Widener, Kelly led the Pride to its record-setting 20th Middle Atlantic Conference (MAC) championship and appearance in quarterfinals of the NCAA Division III Football Championship. His record 12 consecutive wins broke a school record that had stood since 1912 for wins by a first-year coach. For his efforts he was named the MAC Coach of the Year and the ECAC South Co-Coach of the Year. In 2017, Kelly was named the East Coast Football Officials Association (ECFOA) Division III Coach of the Year. He was fired after the 2018 season.

In 2019, Kelly joined Next College Student Athlete, a for-profit organization that connects middle and high school student-athletes with college coaches. In 2024, he was selected as the head coach of the United States national football team competing in the International Federation of American Football's U20 World Junior Championships held in Edmonton.

Kelly was the inaugural commissioner of the 2026 revival of the Continental Football League. He resigned from that position following the league's first season.

== Teaching career ==
Kelly is a former professor of sports management at Drexel University.

== Head coaching record ==
=== College ===
Year	Team	Overall	Conference	Standing	Bowl/playoffs
Valdosta State Blazers (Gulf South Conference) (1997–1999)
1997	Valdosta State	6–5	5–3	T–4th	
1998	Valdosta State	5–6	4–5	T–5th	
1999	Valdosta State	4–5 (Note: Kelly was fired after the first nine games of the 1999 season. Mark Nelson served as interim head coach for the final two games of the season. Valdosta State finished 4–7 overall and 3–6 in Gulf South Conference play, tying for sixth place.)	3–4		
Valdosta State:		15–16	12–12		
Widener Pride (Middle Atlantic Conference) (2014–2018)
2014	Widener	12–1	9–0	1st	L NCAA Division III Quarterfinal
2015	Widener	6–4	6–3	4th	
2016	Widener	6–4	6–3	4th	
2017	Widener	7–4	7–2	T–2nd	
2018	Widener	4–6	4–4	T–4th	
Widener:		35–19	32–12		
Total:		50–35			
National championship Conference title Conference division title or championship game berth

=== CFL ===
Team	Year	Regular season					Postseason		
Team	Year	Won	Lost	Ties	Win %	Finish	Won	Lost	Result
WPG	2009	7	11	0	.389	3rd, East	-	-	Missed playoffs
Total		7	11	0	.389	0 Division Championships	-	-	0 Grey Cups
